= List of hospitals in Ghana =

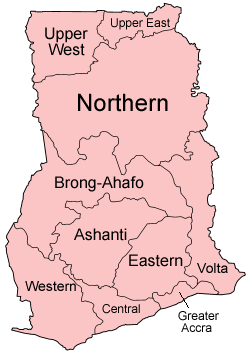
A clickable map of Ghana exhibiting its ten regions.

This is a list of hospitals and health care institutions in Ghana.

== Ashanti Region ==
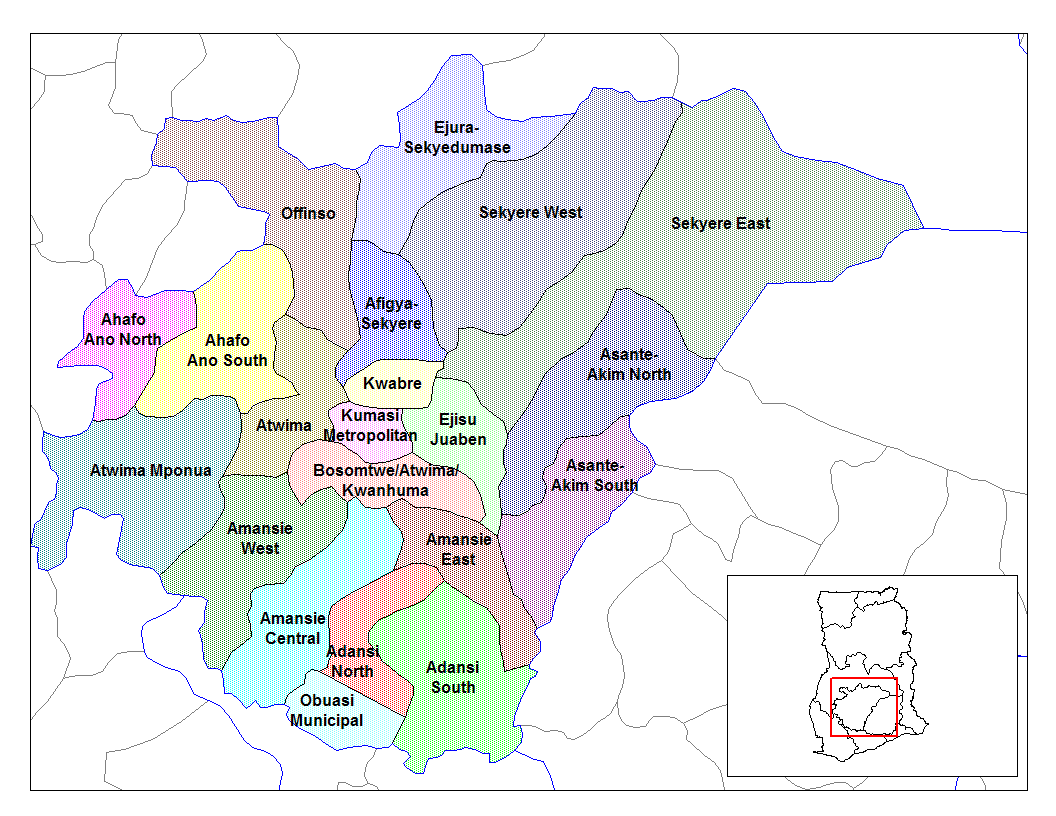

The Ashanti Region has 530 health facilities. 170 of these are operated by the Ghana Health Service, 71 by missions, 281 by private institutions, and eight by the Ashanti quasi-government. The Ashanti monarchy operates about 32 percent of all health facilities in the Ashanti Region.

Hospital	City / town / village	District	website
Ahmadiyya Hospital	Asokore Mampong	Sekyere East District	
Akormaa Memorial SDA Hospital	Kortwia-Abodom	Amansie West	
Anidaso Clinic - Poano	Poano	Bekwai	
Asafo-Agyei Hospital	Kumasi	Kumasi Metropolitan	
Asafo-Boakye Specialist Hospital	Kumasi	Ahenema Kokoben	http://asafoboakyehospital.com
Ashanti Goldfields Company Hospital	Obuasi	Obuasi Municipal	
Bryant Mission Hospital	Obuasi-Adansi	Obuasi Municipal	
City Hospital	Kumasi-Stadium	Kumasi Metropolitan	
County Hospital	Kumasi-Abrepo	Kumasi Metropolitan	
District Hospital	Bekwai	Bekwai Municipal	
District Hospital	Mampong-Ashanti	Mampong Municipal	
District Hospital	Nyinahin	Atwima Mponua	
Divine Mercy Hospital	Eseroso, Kuntanase	Bosomtwe	
Effiduase Hospital	Effiduase	Sekyere East	
Ejisu Hospital	Ejisu	Ejisu-Juaben Municipal	
Ejura Hospital	Ejura	Ejura/Sekyedumase	
Frimpong-Boateng Medical Center	Toase	Atwima Nwabiagya	www.frimpongboatengmedicalcenter.com
Global Evangelical Mission Hospital	Apromase-Ashanti	Ejisu-Juaben Municipal	
Janie Speaks AME Zion Hospital	Afrancho	Bosomtwe	
Juaben Hospital	Juaben	Ejisu-Juaben Municipal	
Juaso District Hospital	Juaso	Asante Akim South	
Kokofu Hospital	Kumasi	Kumasi Metropolitan	
Komfo Anokye Teaching Hospital	Kumasi	Kumasi Metropolitan	
Konongo Hospital	Konongo	Asante Akim North Municipal	
Kumasi South Hospital	Kumasi	Kumasi Metropolitan	
Kuntenase District Hospital	Kuntanase-Ashanti	Bosomtwe	
Kwame Nkrumah University of Science and Technology Hospital	Kumasi	Kumasi Metropolitan	
Manhyia Hospital	Kumasi	Kumasi Metropolitan	
Mankranso Hospital	Mankranso	Ahafo Ano South	
McKenzie Health services	Ahisan-Estae, Kumasi	Kumasi Metropolitan	
Methodist Faith Healing Hospital	Ankaase	Afigya Kwabre South District	
New Edubiase Hospital	New Edubiase	Adansi South	
Nkawie Hospital	Nkawie	Atwima Nwabiagya District	
Nkenkensu Hospital	Kumasi	Kumasi Metropolitan	
Obuasi Hospital	Obuasi	Obuasi Municipal	
Peace & Love Hospital	Oduom-Kumasi	Kumasi Metropolitan	
Pima Hospital	Buokrom Estate-Kumasi	Kumasi Metropolitan	
Presbyterian Hospital	Agogo	Asante Akim North Municipal	
Saint Louis General Hospital	Bodwesango	Adansi North	
Saint Luke's Hospital	Kasei	Ejura/Sekyedumase	
Saint Martins Catholic Hospital	Agroyesum	Amansie West	
Saint Michaels Hospital	Jachie-Pramso	Bosomtwe	
Saint Patrick's Hospital	Maase-Offinso	Offinso Municipal	
SDA Hosepital-Wiamoase	Wiamoase-Kumasi	Sekyere South District	www.sdahospitalwiamoasegh.com
Seventh-Day Adventist Hospital	Asamang	Sekyere South District	
Seventh-Day Adventist Hospital	Dominase	Bekwai Municipal	
Seventh-Day Adventist Hospital	Kwadaso-Kumasi	Kumasi Metropolitan	
Seventh-Day Adventist Hospital	Onwe	Ejisu-Juaben Municipal	
Seventh-Day Adventist Hospital	Wiamoase	Sekyere South	
Suntresu Hospital	Kumasi	Kumasi Metropolitan	
Tafo Hospital	Kumasi	Kumasi Metropolitan	
Tepa Hospital	Tepa	Ahafo Ano North	
Tophill Hospital	Kronum-Cementmu, Kumasi	Afigya- Kwabre	https://tophillhospital.business.site/
TrustCare Specialist Hospital	Kumasi	Kumasi Metropolitan	
West End Hospital	Kumasi	Kumasi Metropolitan	westend-hospital.com

== Brong Ahafo Region ==

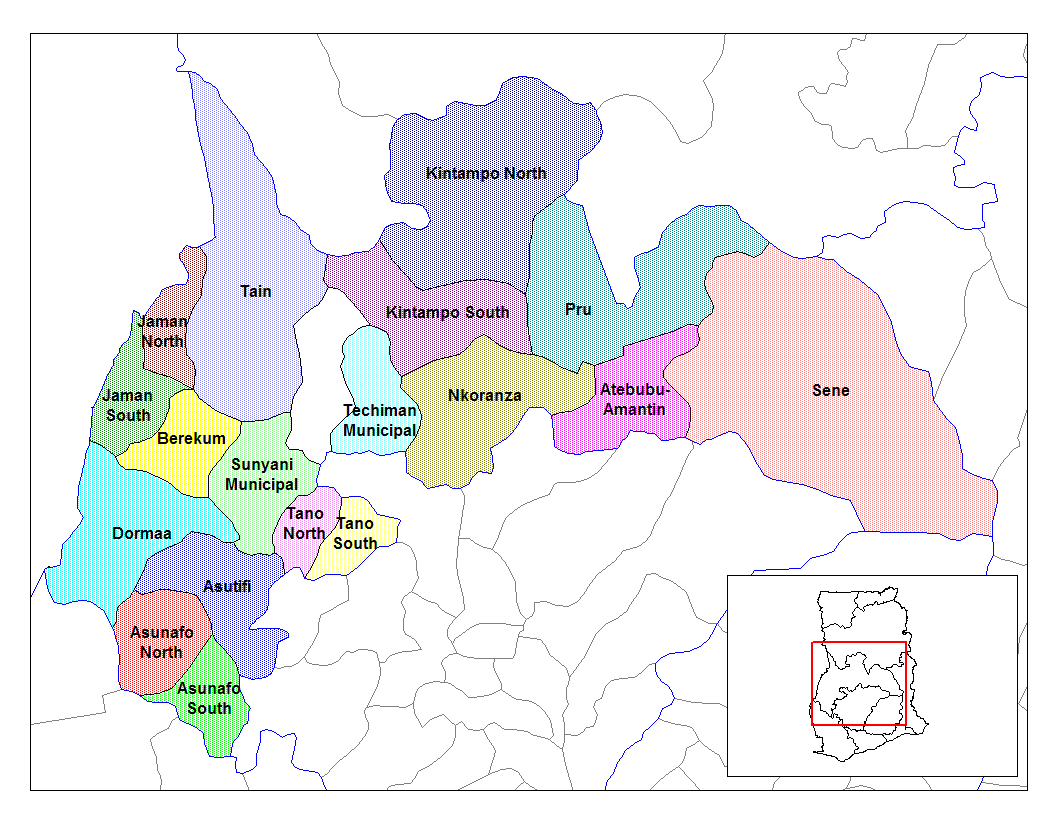

Hospital	City / town / village	District	Website
A1 Hospital (private)	Sankore	Asunafo South	
Acherensua Government Hospital	Acherensua	Asutifi	
District Hospital	Kwame Danso	Sene West	
Government Hospital	Atebubu	Atebubu-Amantin Municipal	
Government Hospital	Bechem	Tano South Municipal	
Government Hospital	Sampa	Jaman North	
Happy Hospital	Berekum	Berekum Municipal	
Holy Family Hospital	Berekum	Berekum Municipal	
Holy Family Teaching Hospital	Techiman	Techiman Municipal	
Lexis Hospital	Sunyani	Sunyani Municipal	
Methodist Hospital	Wenchi	Wenchi Municipal	
Mount Olives Hospital	Techiman	Techiman Municipal	
Municipal Hospital	Goaso	Asunafo North Municipal	
Municipal Hospital	Kintampo	Kintampo North Municipal	
Municipal Hospital	Sunyani	Sunyani Municipal	
Owusu Memorial Hospital	Sunyani	Sunyani Municipal	
Presbyterian Hospital	Dormaa Ahenkro	Dormaa Municipal	
Regional Hospital	Sunyani	Sunyani Municipal	
Saint Elizabeth Hospital	Hwidiem	Asutifi	
Saint John of God Hospital	Domeabra	Nkoranza North	
Saint John of God Hospital	Duayaw Nkwanta	Tano North Municipal	
St. Mary's Hospital	Drobo	Jaman South Municipal	
Saint Mathias Hospital	Yeji	Pru	
Saint Theresa's Hospital	Nkoranza	Nkoranza South	
Sankore Health Centre	Sankore	Asunafo South	
SDA Hospital	Sunyani	Sunyani Municipal	
Star of Light Hospital (private)	Sankore	Asunafo South	
Third Medical Reception Hospital	Sunyani	Sunyani Municipal	
Valley View Adventist Hospital	Techiman	Techiman Municipal	

== Central Region ==

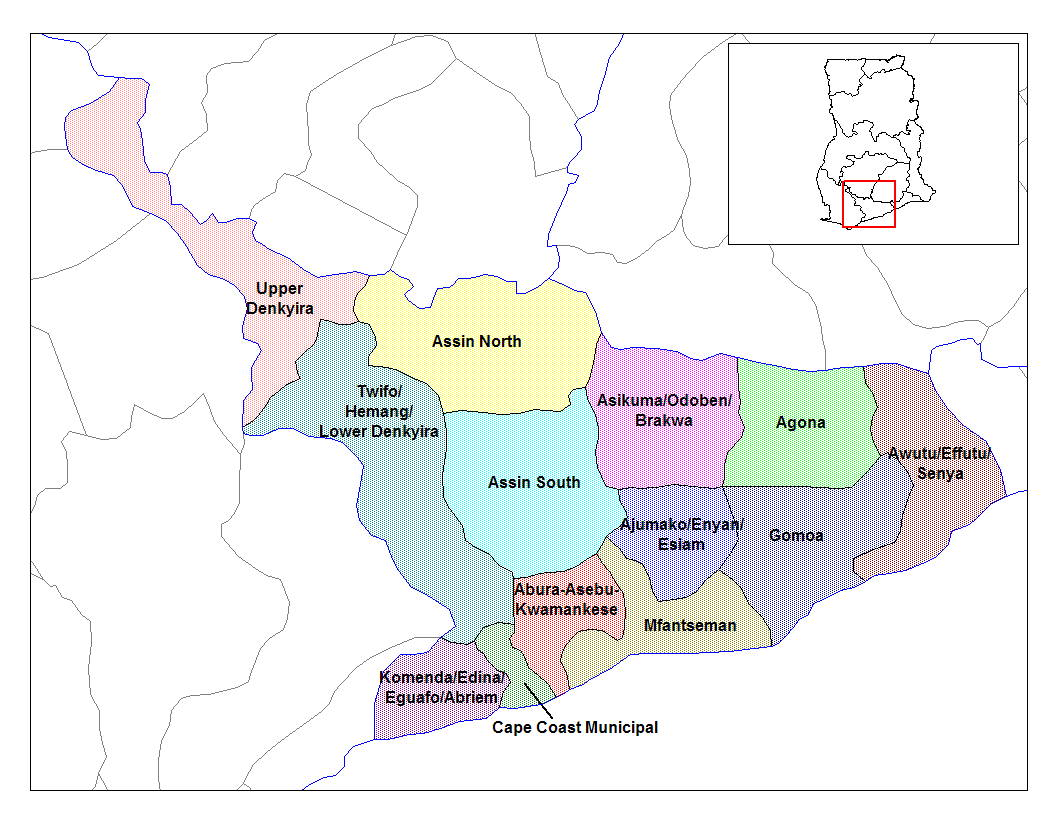

Hospital	City / town / village	District	Website
Ankaful Leprosy/General Hospital	Cape Coast	Cape Coast Metropolitan	
Ankaful Psychiatric Hospital	Cape Coast	Cape Coast Metropolitan	
Cape Coast Teaching Hospital	Cape Coast	Cape Coast Metropolitan	
Catholic Hospital	Apam	Gomoa West	apamhospital.com
District Hospital	Cape Coast	Cape Coast Metropolitan	
District Hospital	Saltpond	Mfantsiman Municipal	
Doctors-In-Service Clinic	Abura, Cape Coast	Cape Coast Metropolitan	www.doctorsinservice.com
Dunkwa Goldfields Hospital	Dunkwa-on-Offin	Upper Denkyira	
Dunkwa Governmental Hospital	Dunkwa-on-Offin	Upper Denkyira	
Government Hospital	Abura-Dunkwa	Abura/Asebu/Kwamankese	
Government Hospital	Agona Swedru	Agona West Municipal	
Government Hospital	Winneba	Effutu Municipal	
Hope Christian Hospital	Gomoa Fetteh	Gomoa East District	www.hope-christian-hospital.webnode.com
Joecarl Medical Centre	Cape Coast	Cape Coast Metropolitan	
Mission Trinity Hospital	Winneba	Effutu Municipal	
Mother and Child Hospital	Kasoa	Awutu Senya East Municipal	
Our Lady of Grace Hospital	Breman Asikuma	Asikuma/Odoben/Brakwa	
Pakphase Medical Center	Cape Coast	Cape Coast Metropolitan	
Presbyterian Hospital	Twifo Praso	Twifo/Heman/Lower Denkyira	
Saint Francis Xavier Hospital Hospital	Assin Foso	Assin North Municipal	
University Hospital	Cape Coast	Cape Coast Metropolitan	
Wesley Clinic	Kasoa	Awutu Senya East Municipal	www.wesleyclinicgh.com

== Eastern Region ==

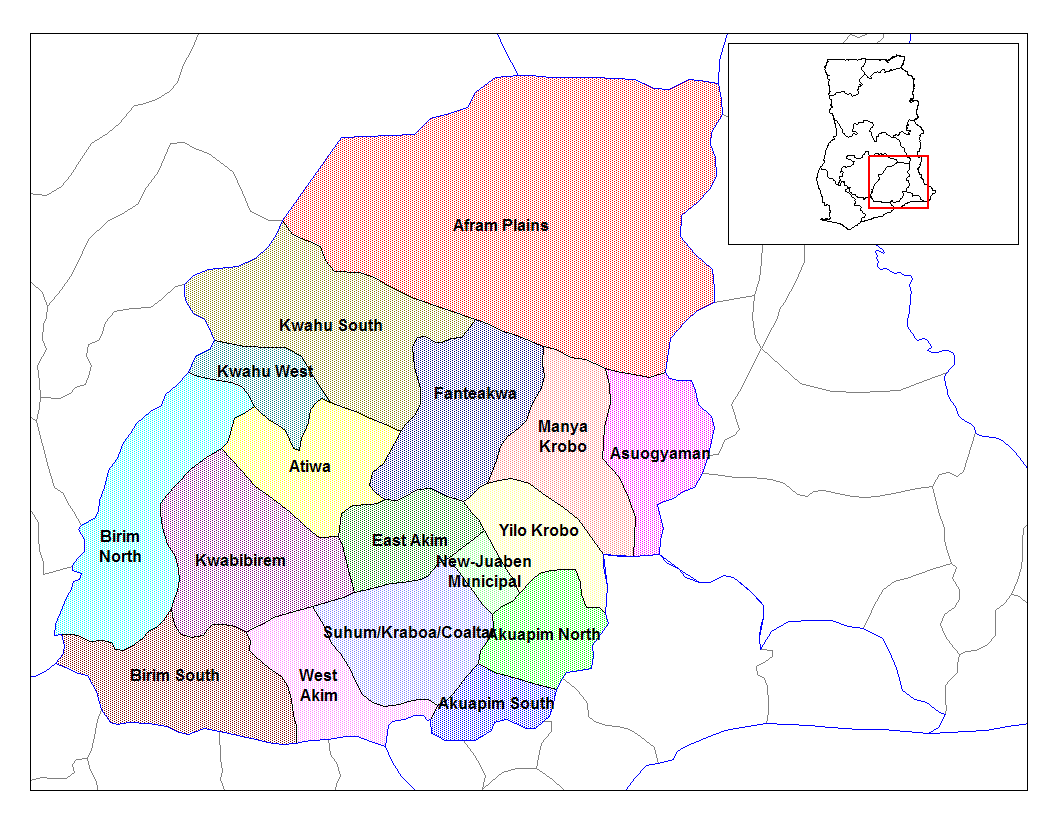

Hospital	City / town / village	District	Website
G.E. Health Centre	Adweso, Koforidua	New-Juaben Municipal	
Government Hospital	Akuse	Lower Manya Krobo	
Government Hospital	Akim Swedru	Birim South	
Government Hospital	Akim Oda	Birim Central Municipal	
Government Hospital	Atua, Odumase Krobo	Lower Manya Krobo	atuagovernmenthospital.com
Government Hospital	Begoro	Fanteakwa	
Government Hospital	Kibi	East Akim Municipal	
Government Hospital	Nsawam	Akuapim South Municipal	
Government Hospital	Suhum	Suhum/Kraboa/Coaltar	
Holy Family Hospital	Nkawkaw	Kwahu West Municipal	
Kade Government Hospital	Kade	Kwaebibirem Municipality	
Kwahu Government Hospital	Atibie	Kwahu South	
Presbyterian Hospital	Donkorkrom	Kwahu North	
Regional Hospital	Koforidua	New-Juaben Municipal	
Saint Dominic's Hospital	Akwatia	Kwaebibirem	
Saint Joseph's Hospital	Effiduase-Koforidua	New-Juaben Municipal	
Saint Martins Hospital	Agormanya	Lower Manya Krobo	
Suhum Government Hospital	Suhum	Suhum/Kraboa/Coaltar	
Tetteh Quarshie Memorial Hospital	Akuapim-Mampong	Akuapim North	
Volta River Authority Hospital, Akosombo	Akosombo	Asuogyaman	

== Greater Accra Region ==

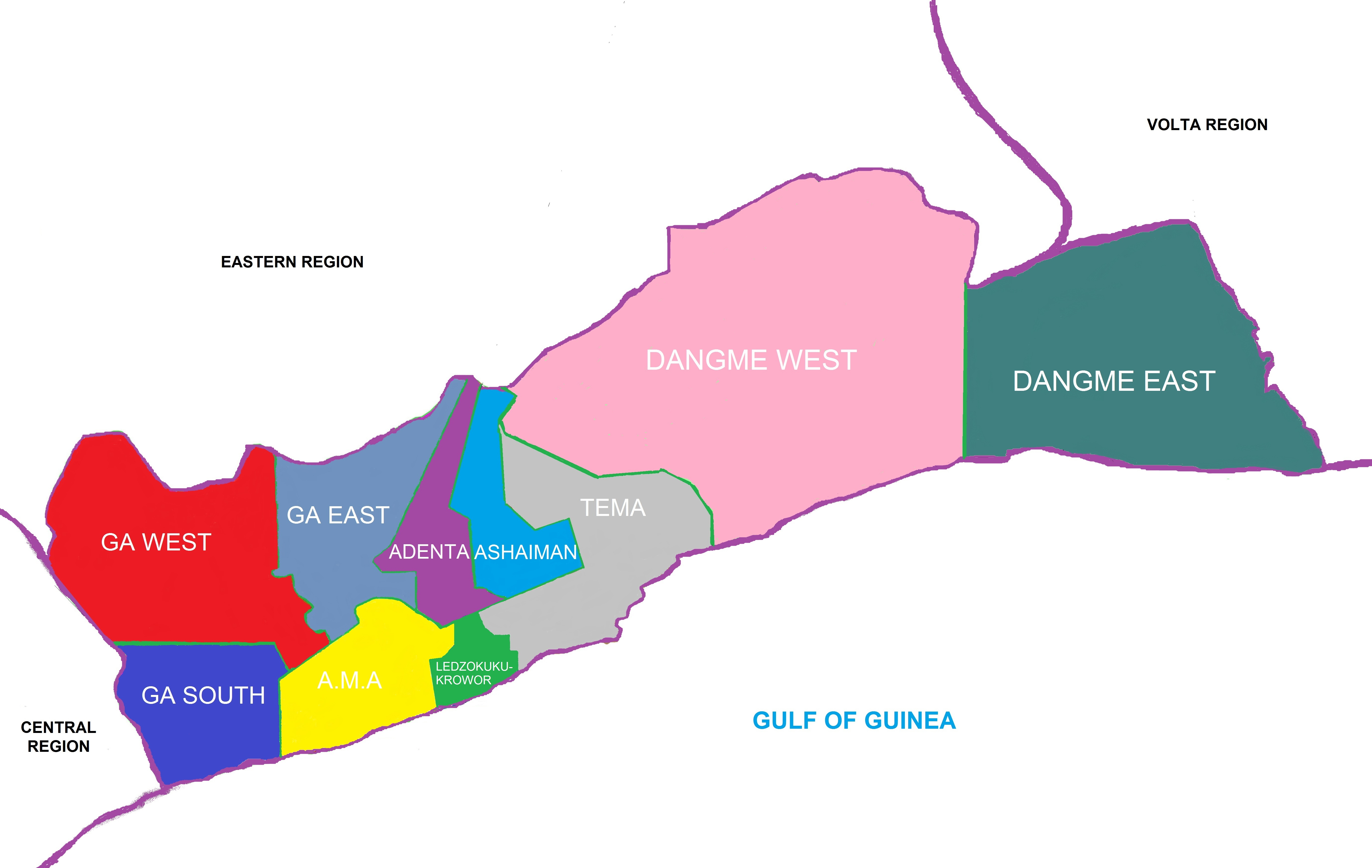

Hospital	City / town / village	District	Website
1st Global Hospital	Nungua	Ledzokuku-Krowor Municipal	
A&A Medlove Medical Centre	Parakuo Estate, Abokobi	GA East	
Accra Psychiatric Hospital	Adabraka	Accra Metropolitan	accrapsychiatrichospital.org
Achimota Hospital	Achimota	Accra Metropolitan	
Airport Women's Hospital	Airport Residential Area, Accra	Accra Metropolitan	airportwomenshospital.com
Akai House Clinic	Accra	Accra Metropolitan	
Aneeja Hospital	Achimota-Tantra Hill	GA West Municipal	
Atta Quarshie Memorial Hospital	Odogono, Accra	Accra Metropolitan	
Baatsona Good Shepherd Medical Centre	Accra	Accra Metropolitan	
Bemuah Royal Hospital	East Legon, Legon	Accra Metropolita	bemuah hospitals.com
Bengali Hospital	Tema	Accra Metropolitan	
Bethel Hospital	Tema	Accra Metropolitan	
Caiquo Hospital	Accra	Accra Metropolitan	
Cantonments Hospital	Cantonments	Accra Metropolitan	
C&J General Hospital	Sakumono	Accra Metropolitan	
Christian Care Center	Accra	Accra Metropolitan	
The Community Hospital	Ashongman	Ga East Municipal	http://www.thecommunityhospitals.org/
Crown Medical Centre	Adenta West, Accra	Accra Metropolitan	http://www.crownmedgh.com
Dansoman Asoredanho Community Clinic (general practice)	Dansoman Asoedanho	Ablekuma North Municipal	
Del International Hospital	East Legon	Accra Metropolitan	delinternationalhospital.org
District Hospital	Abokobi	Ga East Municipal	
Dodowa District Hospital	Dodowa	Dangme West	
Eden Family Hospital	North Kaneshie	Accra Metropolitan	
Efah Victory Clinic	Pig Farm, Accra	Accra Metropolitan	
Egon German Clinic (obstetrics and gynaecology)	Abelenkpe	Accra Metropolitan	
Elitecare Medical Center Ghana	Accra	Accra Metropolitan	elitecarecenter.com
Euracare	North Labone	Accra Metropolitan	https://euracarehealth.com/
Family Health Hospital	Accra	Accra Metropolitan	
Family Health Hospital	Teshie	Ledzokuku-Krowor Municipal	
Finney Hospital and Fertility Centre	Weija	Ga South Municipal	finneyhospital.com
Gbegbe Royal Community Clinic	Agege Last Stop, Gbegbeyise, Accra	Accra Metropolitan	
Gbegbe Royal Community Clinic	Gbegbe	Ga South Municipal	
Greater Grace Hospital	Pantang	Accra Metropolitan	
Health Care Center & Clinic of Cantonments	Cantonments	Accra Metropolitan	
Hill Top Surgical Hospital	Achimota	Accra Metropolitan	hilltopsurgicalhospital.ga
Holy Trinity hospital	Accra	Accra Metropolitan	
Impact Medical and Diagnostic Centre	Asylum Down	Accra Metropolitan	https://www.impactclinic.com.gh
Inkoom Hospital	Baatsonaa, Nungua	Ledzokuku-Krowor Municipal	
International Health Care Centre	Accra	Accra Metropolitan	
Jubail Specialist Hospital	Sakumono	Tema Metropolitan	
Justab Hospital	Accra	Accra Metropolitan	
Kalbi Hospital	Accra	Accra Metropolitan	
KariKari Brobbey Hospital	Accra	Accra Metropolitan	
King David Hospital	Sakumono	Accra Metropolitan	
Korle Bu Teaching Hospital	Korle Gonno, Accra	Accra Metropolitan	KBTH
Kumoji Hospital	Labone	Accra Metropolitan	
LEKMA Hospital	Accra	Accra Metropolitan	
La General Hospital	Accra	Accra Metropolitan	
Lapaz Community Hospital	Abeka-Lapaz	Accra Metropolitan	lapazcommunityhospital.org
Lighthouse Mission Hospital	North Kaneshie	Accra Metropolitan	
Lister Hospital	Airport Hills, Accra	Accra Metropolitan	
Manna Mission Hospital	Teshie-Nungua	Ledzokuku-Krowor Municipal	
Medifem Hospital	Westlands/West Legon-Haatso Road, Legon	Accra Metropolitan	medifemhospital.com
Military Hospital	Accra	Accra Metropolitan	
Narh-Bita Hospital	Tema	Tema Metropolitan	
New Ashongman Hospital	Ashongman	Ga East Municipal	
New Crystal Hospital	Accra	Accra Metropolitan	
New Hope Hospital	Accra	Accra Metropolitan	
North Legon Hospital	North Legon	Accra Metropolitan	
North Ridge Clinic	North Ridge Residential Area, North Ridge	Accra Metropolitan	
Nyaho Medical Centre	Airport Residential Area, Accra	Accra Metropolitan	
Obengfo Hospital	Accra	Accra Metropolitan	
Omabod Dental & Wellness Center	Accra	Accra Metropolitan	omabodent.com
Opmann Clinic	Abeka-Lapaz	Accra Metropolitan	
Otobia Memorial Hospital	Accra	Accra Metropolitan	
Pantang Hospital	Pantang	Ga East Municipal	
Pentecost Hospital, Madina	Accra	Accra Metropolitan	
Police Hospital	Cantonments	Accra Metropolitan	
Prilway Specialist Clinic	Madina	Ga East Municipal	
Prime Care Medical Centre	Accra	Accra Metropolitan	
Princess Marie Louise Hospital (children's hospital)	Accra	Accra Metropolitan	
Provita Specialist Hospital	Tema	Tema Metropolitan	provitaspecialisthospital.com
Raphal Medical Center	Community 10, Tema	Tema Metropolitan	
Ridge Regional Hospital	North Ridge	Accra Metropolitan	
Rofhi Hospital	Accra	Accra Metropolitan	
Royal Good Shepherd Hospital	Accra	Accra Metropolitan	
St John's Hospital & Fertility Centre	Tantra Hill Roundabout, Accra	Accra Metropolitan	stjohnsgh.com
Sakumono Community Multiplex Hospital	Sakumono	Tema Metropolitan	
Sam J Specialist Hospital	Accra	Accra Metropolitan	
Shalom Medical Center	North Ridge	Accra Metropolitan	
Shiloh Medical Center	Dangme West Municipal	Ningo Prampram District	
Sinel Specialist Hospital (specialist hospital)	Tema	Accra Metropolitan	
Tema General Hospital	Tema	Tema Metropolitan	
Tema Polyclinic	Tema	Tema Metropolitan	
Tema Women's Hospital	Tema	Tema Metropolitan	
The Trust Hospital	Accra	Accra Metropolitan	The Trust Hospital
University Hospital	Legon	Accra Metropolitan	
Valco Hospital	Tema	Tema Metropolitan	
VEBS Medical Centre	Accra	Accra Metropolitan	
Vicom Specialist Hospital (specialist hospital)	Accra	Accra Metropolitan	
Vision Hospital	Oyarifa East	Accra Metropolitan	
VRA Hospital	Accra	Accra Metropolitan	

== Northern Region ==

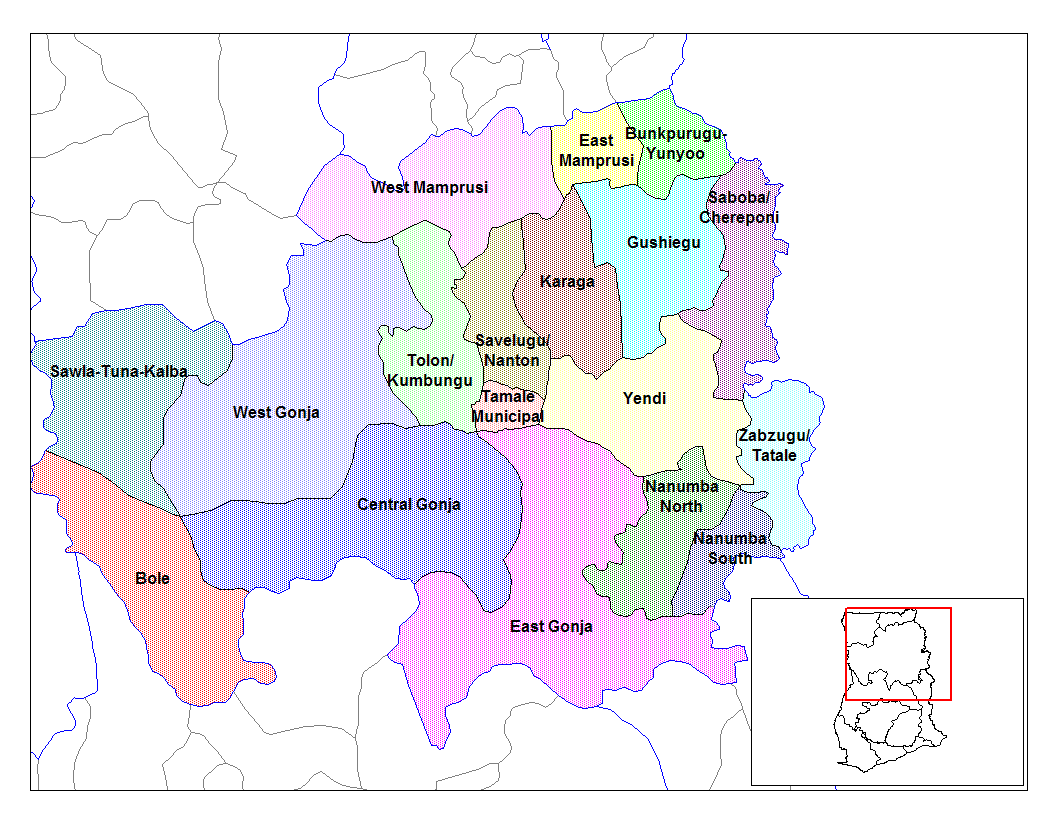

Hospital	City / town / village	District	Website
Aisha Hospital	Tamale	Tamale Metropolitan	https://aishahospital.com/
Baptist Medical Centre	Nalerigu	East Mamprusi	
Binde Medical Centre	Binde	Bunkpurugu-Yunyoo District	
Bruham Medical Centre	Savelugu	Savelugu	
Catholic Hospital	Tamale	Tamale Metropolitan	
District Hospital	Bole	Bole	
District Hospital	Yendi	Yendi Municipal	
East Gonja District Hospital	Salaga	East Gonja	
Habana Medical Service	Tamale	Tamale Metropolitan	www.habanaclinic.com
Haj Adams Medical Centre	Tamale	Tamale Metropolitan	
Kabsad Hospital	Tamale	Tamale Metropolitan	
Karaga District Hospital	Karaga	Karaga District	
The King's Medical Centre	Bontanga	Kumbungu District	https://tkvg.org.uk/health
Kpandai District Hospital	Kpandai	Kpandai District	
Modern Surgical Hospital	Savelugu	Savelugu	
Newlife Clinic and Laboratory	Tamale	Tamale Metropolitan	
Regional Hospital (Central)	Tamale	Tamale Metropolitan	
Saboba Medical Centre	Saboba	Saboba Chereponi	sabobamedicalcentre.net
Savelugu Municipal Hospital	Savelugu	Savelugu	
Seventh-Day Adventist Hospital	Tamale	Tamale Metropolitan	
Tamale Teaching Hospital	Tamale	Tamale Metropolitan	www.tamaleteachinghospital.org
University for Development Studies Hospital	Tamale	Tamale Metropolitan	
West Gonja District Hospital	Damongo	West Gonja	
West Hospital	Tamale	Tamale Metropolitan	
West Mamprusi District Hospital	Walewale	West Mamprusi	
Zabzugu Tatale District Hospital	Zabzugu	Zabzugu Tatale District	

== Upper East Region ==

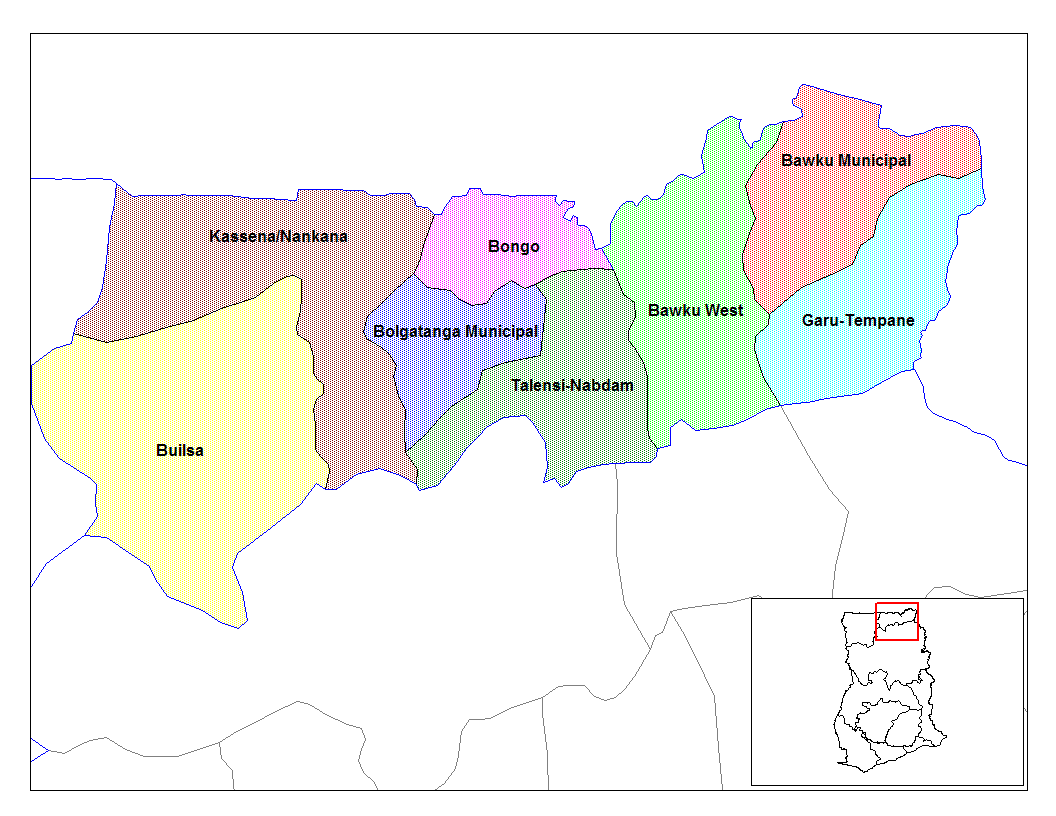

Hospital	City / town / village	District	Website
Bongo Hospital	Bongo	Bongo	
Garu-Tempane District Hospital	Garu	Garu	
Presbyterian Hospital	Bawku	Bawku Municipal	http://www.vriendenvanbawku.nl/
Quality Medical Center Garu	Garu	Garu	
Regional Hospital	Bolgatanga	Bolgatanga Municipal	
Sandema Hospital	Sandema	Builsa	
War Memorial Hospital	Navrongo	Kassena-Nankana	
Zebilla Hospital	Zebilla	Bawku West	

== Upper West Region ==

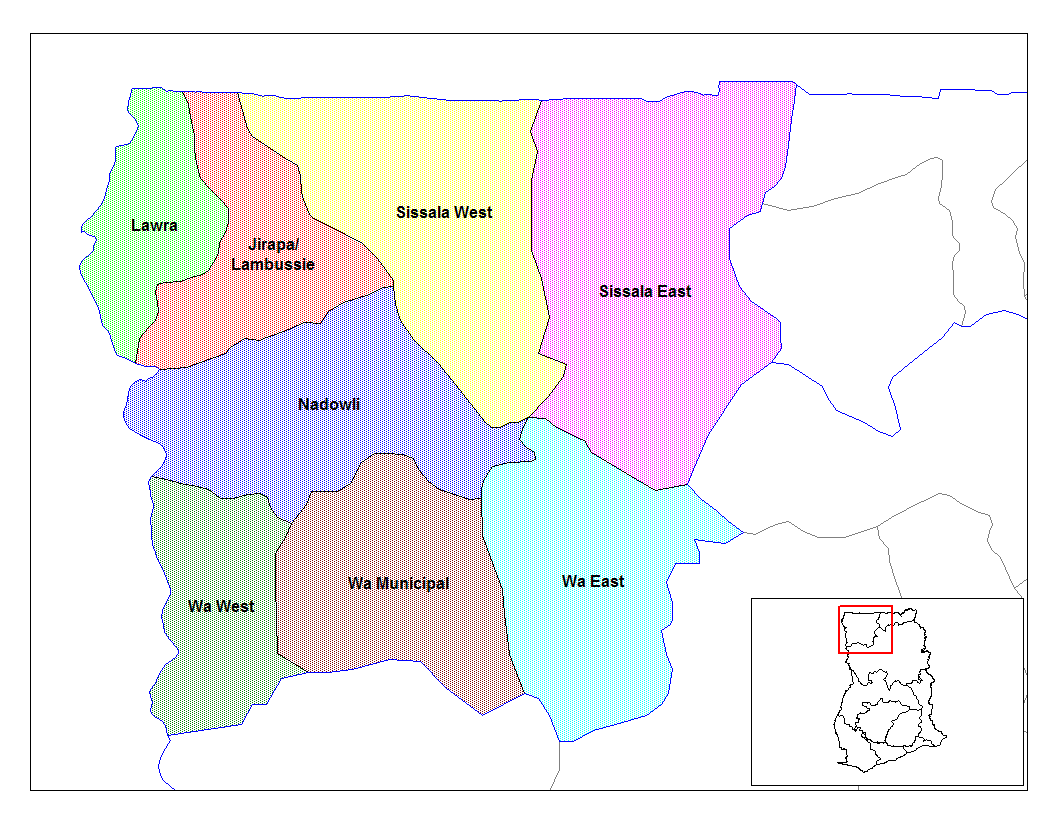

Hospital	City / town / village	District	Website
Ahmadiyya Muslim Hospital	Kaleo	Nadowli	
Ahmadiyya Muslim Clinic	Wa	Wa Municipal	
Islamic Hospital		Wa Municipal	
Jirapa Hospital	Jirapa	Jirapa/Lambussie	
Lawra Hospital	Lawra	Lawra	
Nadowli Hospital	Nadowli	Nadowli	
Nandom Hospital	Nandom	Nandom	
Regional Hospital	Wa	Wa Municipal	
Saint Joseph's Hospital	Jirapa	Jirapa/Lambussie	
Saint Theresa's Hospital	Nandom	Nandom	
Tumu Hospital	Tumu	Sissala East	
Virtue Medical Centre	Tumu	Sissala East	

== Volta Region ==

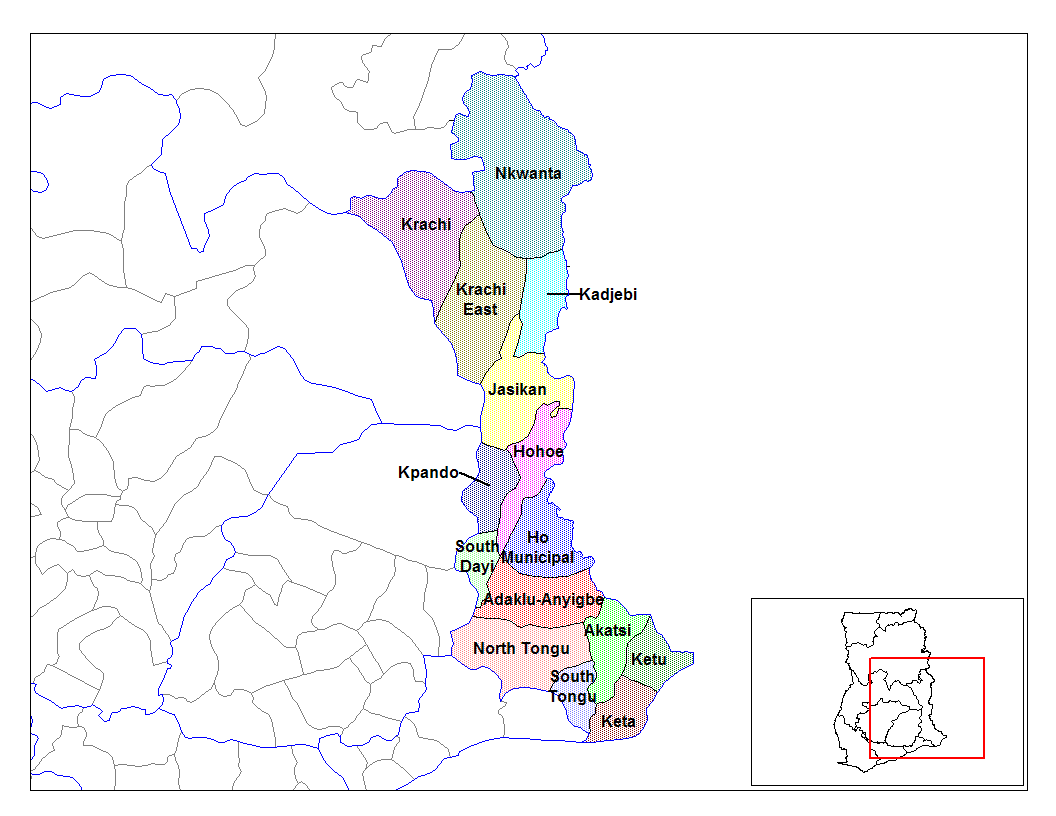

Hospital	City / town / village	District	Website
Adidome Government Hospital	Adidome	North Tongu	
Anfoega Catholic Hospital	Anfoega	Kpando	
Catholic Hospital	Aveyime-Battor	North Tongu	
Central Aflao Hospital	Avoeme, Aflao	Ketu South	
District Hospital	Nkwanta	Nkwanta South	
Evangelical Presbyterian Church Hospital	Adidome	North Tongu	
Evangelical Presbyterian Church Hospital	Worawora	Jasikan	
Government Hospital	Kete Krachi	Krachi West	
Government Hospital	Sogakope	South Tongu	
Hohoe District Hospital	Hohoe	Hohoe Municipal	
Jasikan District Hospital	Jasikan	Jasikan	
Keta District Hospital	Keta	Keta Municipal	
Ketu South Municipal Hospital	Aflao	Ketu South	
Margret Marquart Catholic Hospital	Kpando	Kpando	
Mary Theresa Hospital	Dodi Papase	Kadjebi	
Municipal Hospital	Ho	Ho Municipal	
New Hope Clinic	Viepe, Aflao	Ketu South	
Peki Government Hospital	Peki	South Dayi	
Regional Hospital	Ho	Ho Municipal	
Richard Novati Catholic Hospital (Comboni Centre)	Sogakope	South Tongu	rnch.org
Sacred Heart Hospital	Weme, Abor	Keta Municipal	
Saint Anthony's Hospital	Dzodze	Ketu North	
Saint Joseph's Hospital	Nkwanta	Nkwanta South	
Wellspan Health	Aborkutsime, Abor	Keta Municipal	https://wellspan-health-ghana.business.site/
Worawora District Hospital	Worawora	Jasikan	

== Western Region ==

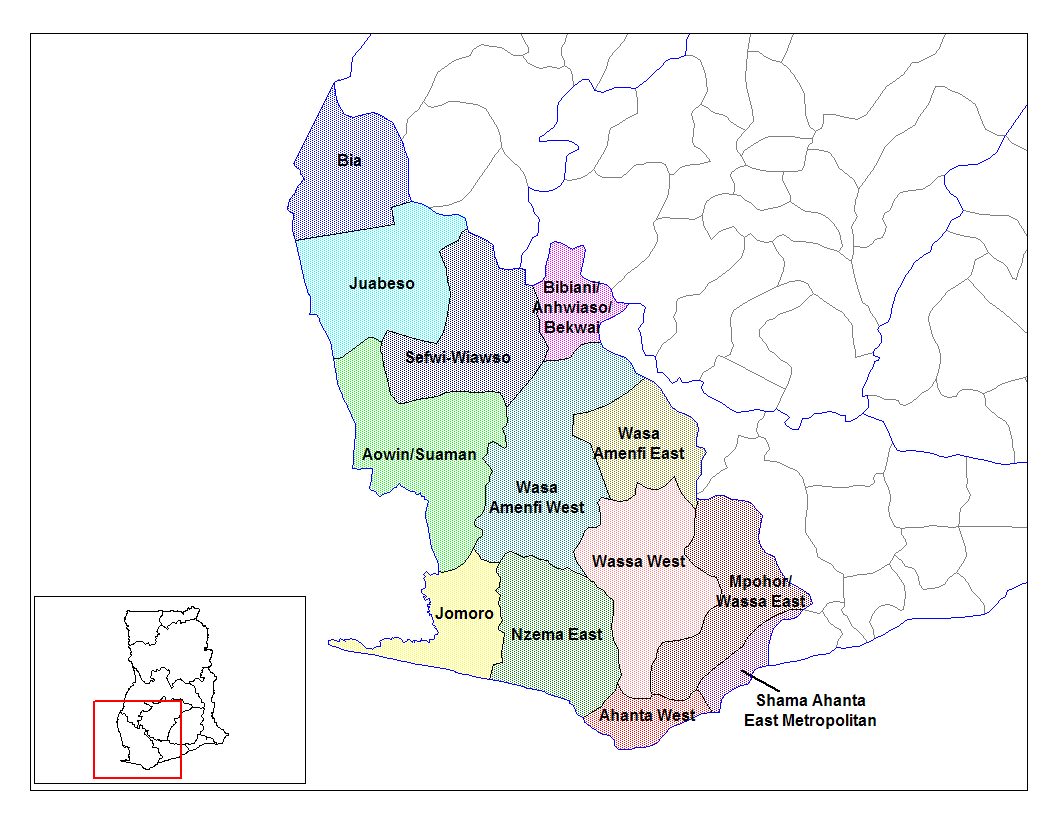

Hospital	City / town / village	District	Website
Abdul Baki Specialist Hospital	Takoradi	Sekondi Takoradi Metropolitan	
Bibiani Government Hospital	Bibiani	Bibiani/Anhwiaso/Bekwai	
Christina Adcock and Sons Christian Hospital	Ateiku, Wassa-Akropong	Wasa Amenfi East	
Effia Nkwanta Regional Hospital	Takoradi	Sekondi Takoradi Metropolitan	
Essikado Hospital	Takoradi	Sekondi Takoradi Metropolitan	
Father Thomas Alan Rooney Memorial Hospital	Asankragua	Wasa Amenfi West	
Fountain Care Hospital	Sampa	Jaman North	
Glado Dental Clinic	Takoradi	Sekondi-Takoradi	
Nagel Memorial Hospital	Takoradi	Sekondi Takoradi Metropolitan	
Nana Hima Dekyi Hospital	Dixcove	Ahanta West	
Saint John of God Hospital	Wiawso	Sefwi-Wiawso	
Saint Martin de Porres Hospital	Eikwe	Nzema East Municipal	eikwe-hospital.org
Seventh-Day Adventist Clinic	Suaman-Dadieso, Enchi	Aowin/Suaman	
Sycamore Medical Centre	Adientem, Takoradi	Sekondi Takoradi Metropolitan	
Tarkwa Government Hospital	Tarkwa	Tarkwa-Nsuaem Municipal	

== See also ==
- National Health Insurance Scheme (Ghana)
