= List of hospitals in the Ashanti Region =

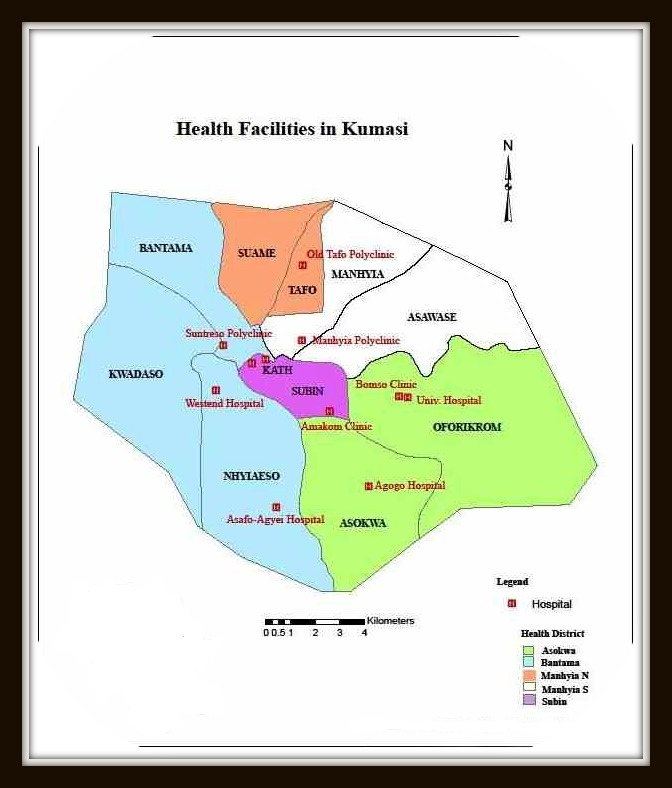
Kumasi Metropolitan health facilities map

This is a list of hospitals and health care institutions in the Ashanti Region of Ghana.

== Structure ==
The Ashanti Region has 530 health facilities. 170 of these are operated by the Ghana Health Service; 71 by missions; 281 by private institutions; and 8 by the Ashanti quasi-government. The Ashanti monarchy operates about 32 percent of all health facilities in the Ashanti Region.

== Ashanti Region hospitals ==
Hospital	Settlement	District	Website
Abenkyiman Hospital	Anwia-Nkwanta	Bekwai Municipal	
Adiebeba Hospital	Ahodwo-Kumasi	Kumasi metropolitan	https://www.adiebebahospital.com/
Ahmadiyya Hospital	Asokore Ashanti	Sekyere East District	
Akormaa Memorial SDA Hospital	Kortwia-Abodom	Amansie West	
Ama Serwaah Hospital, Kronum			https://amaserwaahospital.com/
Anidaso Clinic - Poano	Poano	Bekwai Municipal	
Asafo-Agyei Hospital	Kumasi	Kumasi Metropolitan	
Ashanti Goldfields Company Hospital	Obuasi	Obuasi Municipal	
Bryant Mission Hospital	Obuasi-Adansi	Obuasi Municipal	
City Hospital	Stadium - Kumasi	Asokwa	https://www/cityhospitalgh.com
County Hospital	Kumasi-Abrepo	Kumasi Metropolitan	
District Hospital	Bekwai	Bekwai Municipal	
District Hospital	Mampong-Ashanti	Mampong Municipal	
District Hospital	Nyinahin	Atwima Mponua	
Divine Mercy Hospital	Eseroso, Kuntanase	Bosomtwe	
Effiduase Hospital	Effiduase	Sekyere East	
Ejisu Hospital	Ejisu	Ejisu-Juaben Municipal	
Ejura Hospital	Ejura	Ejura/Sekyedumase	
Frimpong-Boateng Medical Center	Toase	Atwima Nwabiagya	https://www.frimpongboatengmedicalcenter.com
Global Evangelical Mission Hospital	Apromase-Ashanti	Ejisu-Juaben Municipal	
Komfo Anokye Teaching Hospital	Kumasi	Kumasi Metropolitan	KATH
Janie Speaks AME Zion Hospital	Afrancho	Bosomtwe	
Juaben Hospital	Juaben	Ejisu-Juaben Municipal	
Juaso District Hospital	Juaso	Asante Akim South	
Kokofu Hospital	Kumasi	Kumasi Metropolitan	
Konongo Hospital	Konongo	Asante Akim North Municipal	
Kumasi Hospital	Kumasi	Kumasi Metropolitan Sokoban-Ampayoo	
Kumasi South Hospital	Kumasi	Kumasi Metropolitan	
Kuntenase District Hospital	Kuntanase-Ashanti	Bosomtwe	
Kwame Nkrumah University of Science and Technology Hospital	Kumasi	Kumasi Metropolitan	
Living Waters Specialist Hospital	Ejisu Krapa-Ejisu-Juaben	Ashanti	http://www.livingwatershospital.org
Manhyia Hospital	Kumasi	Kumasi Metropolitan	
Mankranso Hospital	Mankranso	Ahafo Ano South	
McKenzie Health services	Ahisan-Estae, Kumasi	Kumasi Metropolitan	
Methodist Faith Healing Hospital	Ankasi	Asante Akim North Municipal	
New Edubiase Hospital	New Edubiase	Adansi South	
Nkawie Hospital	Nkawie	Atwima Nwabiagya District	
Nkenkensu Hospital	Kumasi	Kumasi Metropolitan	
Obuasi Hospital	Obuasi	Obuasi Municipal	
Peace & Love Hospital	Oduom-Kumasi	Kumasi Metropolitan	
Pima Hospital	Buokrom Estate-Kumasi	Kumasi Metropolitan	
Presbyterian Hospital	Agogo	Asante Akim North Municipal	
Saint Louis General Hospital	Bodwesango	Adansi North	
Saint Luke's Hospital	Kasei	Ejura/Sekyedumase	
Saint Martins Catholic Hospital	Agroyesum	Amansie West	
Saint Michaels Hospital	Jachie-Pramso	Bosomtwe	
Saint Patrick's Hospital	Maase-Offinso	Offinso Municipal	
SDA Hospital	Obuasi-Adansi	Obuasi East District	http://www.obuasiadventisthospital.com
Seventh-Day Adventist Hospital	Asamang	Sekyere South	
Seventh-Day Adventist Hospital	Dominase	Bekwai Municipal	
Seventh-Day Adventist Hospital	Kwadaso-Kumasi	Kumasi Metropolitan	
Seventh-Day Adventist Hospital	Onwe	Ejisu-Juaben Municipal	
Seventh-Day Adventist Hospital	Wiamoase	Sekyere South	
Suntresu Hospital	Kumasi	Kumasi Metropolitan	
Tafo Hospital	Kumasi	Old Tafo Municipal	
Tepa Hospital	Tepa	Ahafo Ano North	
TrustCare Specialist Hospital	Kumasi	Kumasi Metropolitan	
West End Hospital	Kumasi	Kumasi Metropolitan	westend-hospital.com

== Kumasi hospitals and health facilities ==
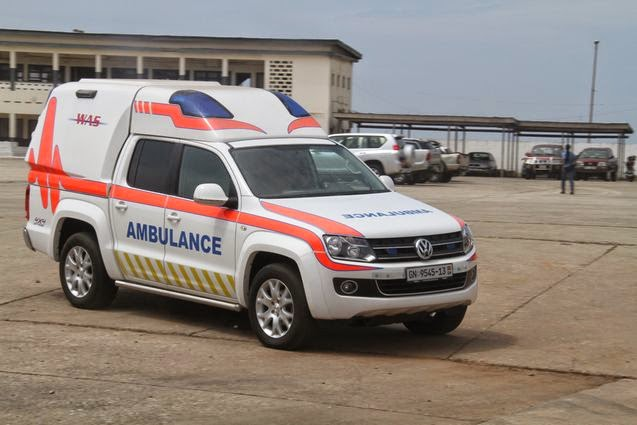
Ashanti Region car-based non-acute patient transport ambulance in Kumasi Metropolis

The Ashanti capital Kumasi metropolis has the highest number of health facilities in Ashanti region, at 38%. Kumasi has a teaching hospital to support the medical training at the Kwame Nkrumah University of Science and Technology (Komfo Anokye Teaching Hospital), the West End Hospital, several other private hospitals, public clinics and small hospitals.

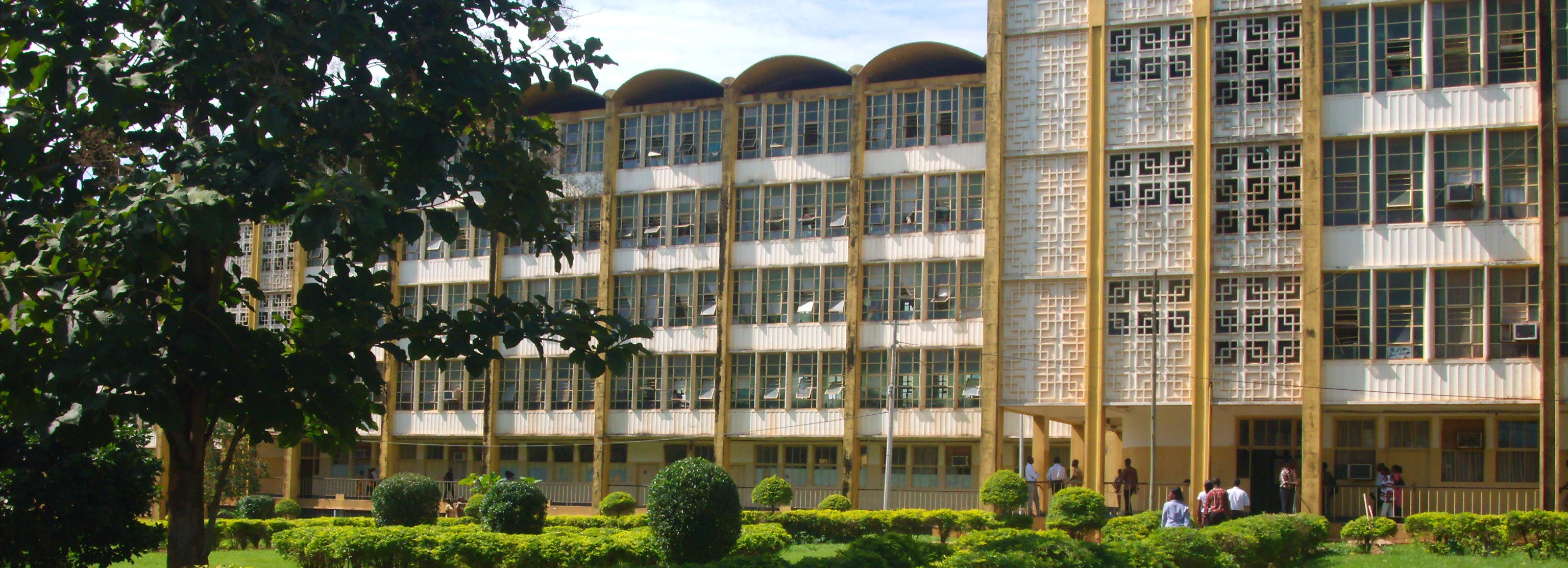
Panoramic view of the largest hospital and health facility in Ashanti region the Komfo Anokye Teaching Hospital (KATH) in Kumasi Metropolis

== See also ==
- Architecture of Africa
- Healthcare in Ghana
- List of hospitals in Ghana
