= Jacob Kwakye-Maafo =

Ghanaian physician

- Born: 1940 (age 85–86); Ghana
- Occupations: Physician (Obstetrics and Gynecology) Chief of Assin Nsuta, Ghana
- Spouse: Mercy Kwakye-Maafo née Mercy Golightly
- Children: Three
- Parent: Opanin Kwabena Maafo (father) Mary Akosua Boateng (mother)
- Relatives: Yaw Osafo-Maafo (brother)

Jacob Kenneth Kofi Kwakye-Maafo (born 1940), also known as Nana Ohemeng Awere V, is a Ghanaian physician and a surgeon who specialises in Obstetrics and Gynecology and traditional ruler of Assin Nsuta and the chief executive of the West End Hospital, Kumasi. A past president of the Ghana Medical Association, he is an advocate of community health and has helped establish several health centres, rural hospitals and clinics in the Ashanti Region of Ghana notably the Ankaasi Faith Healing Methodist Hospital and the Lake Clinic at Amakom near Lake Bosomtwi. He was a member of the committee set up by the government of Ghana in 2003, tasked with the implementation of the National Health Insurance Scheme in Ghana.

Kwakye-Maafo is the elder brother of Yaw Osafo-Maafo, the former finance minister during the John Kufuor administration and Isaac Adjei-Maafo, who was a Minister of Agriculture and later head of the Ghana Cocoa Board during the PNDC era.

== Early life and education ==
Jacob Kenneth Kwakye-Maafo had his primary education at Awisa Presbyterian Boarding School, Akim-Awisa, in the Eastern Region of Ghana, from 1944 to 1953. In January 1954 he entered the Abuakwa State College. In January 1959, he entered sixth form at the Opoku Ware School in Kumasi, where he passed his Cambridge High School Certificate in 1960.

In August 1961 he was awarded the Ghana Government Scholarship to study Medicine in Germany where he studied German at the University of Leipzig and University of Greifswald in 1962; he was admitted to the Freie University of Berlin, under the German/Ghanaian Scholarship Programme DAAD. He graduated as a Medical Practitioner after passing the State Examination (Staatsexamens) in September 1968.

In 1971 he was awarded the Doctor of Medicine (MD) Degree at the Freie University, Berlin (MB, ChB). After qualification, he worked in several hospitals in Berlin including the Rudolf VIRCHOW, Westend Klinikum and the Frauenklinik am Mariendorferweg.

== Career ==
As a committed and patriotic citizen, Kwakye-Maafo returned to Ghana in January 1972 to serve his country in several capacities. He served as a medical officer and then as a senior medical officer in many hospitals, namely, the Komfo Anokye Teaching Hospital, the Mampong Maternity Hospital, and the Korle Bu Teaching Hospital, Accra. In 1979, Kwakye-Maafo with the help of his wife Mercy established the West End Clinic, named after the ‘Westend Klinikum’ in Germany. The clinic started initially as an outpatients’ clinic, but has over the years developed into a 40-bed hospital with theatre facilities for both minor and major surgeries. The hospital is now a referral centre to clients within and around the Kumasi metropolis.

=== Other roles ===
- A Medical Consultant to the Methodist Church of Ghana;
- A Member of the National Health Insurance Council
- A fellow and Past President of the Ghana Medical Association;
- A fellow of the West African College of Physicians;
- A foundation fellow of the Ghana College of Physicians and Surgeons;
  NANA (DR) OHEMENG AWERE V
- An R3M Champion/ An NGO championing the reduction of maternal and neonatal mortality in Ghana;
- A Member of the Medical & Dental Council of Ghana (2000–2006)
- A Member of the Nurses and Midwives Council of Ghana (2000–2008)
- A Member of the Korle-Bu Teaching Hospital Board (2000–2008)

== Reign ==
=== Chief of Assin Nsuta ===
On 19 December 2005, he was installed the Chief of Assin Nsuta and the ‘Benkumhene’ or Divisional Chief of the Assin Apimanim Traditional Area in the Central Region under the Stool name of ‘Nana Ohemeng Awere V’.

== Personal life ==
Kwakye-Maafo is married to Mercy, a retired general and psychiatric nurse. Together have three children Fred, Marion, Harry and several grandchildren. He currently resides in the Ashanti region of Ghana. A staunch Methodist, he also provides consultancy to the Methodist church hospitals in Ghana.

== Articles, publications and presentations ==
- "On Haemagglutination Inhibition Measles Antibodies of Pregnant Women and the Newborn" – Separation of 7S and 19S Measles Antibodies – inaugural dissertation, Berlin 1971.
- The Private Sector as a major Collaborator in the Health Care Delivery with emphasis on maternal and child health – April 1995
- "Quality Health Care in Ghanaian Health Institutions" - Appraisal and Challenges for the Future - Address to members of the Ghana Medical Association and to the Nation - October, 1998
- "Arresting the Brain Drain in the Health Sector" – Address to members of the Ghana Medical Association and to the Nation – November, 1999.
- Integrating Traditional Medicine into Health Care Systems — 20–21 July 2001. GIMPA, Accra.
- “The Role of the Private Sector in the Health Delivery System.” Paper delivered at the 2nd Annual Public Lecture of the University of Ghana Medical Students Association (UGMS) Wednesday, 26 March 2003
- “Pushing Forward Ghana’s Health Agenda” Responsibilities and Expectations of the Health Personnel in the New Ghana Health Service Paper delivered at the KNUST-MSA Inaugural Public Lecture Friday, 12 September 2003
- Challenges facing the Health Care Provider with the Introduction of National Health Insurance Scheme. 16 September 2004
- Ghanaian Perspective of Achieving Quality Health Care: The role of Traditional Medicine. Integrating Traditional Medicine into Orthodox Medicine: Is Ghana ready? [8]
- Challenges facing regional co-coordinating councils, District Assemblies and Health Care Providers with the Introduction of the National Health Insurance Scheme in Ghana.
- A Paper on the National Health Insurance in Ghana. * Historical Background. * Objectives and Designs. * Achievements & Challenges.

== See also ==
- Yaw Osafo-Maafo
- West End Hospital, Kumasi
- Opoku Ware School
