= St. Martin de Porres Hospital (Eikwe) =

- Catholic Church of Ghana

Geography
- Location: Eikwe, Ellembelle District, Western Region, Ghana
- Coordinates: 4.965213°N 2.469751°W

Organisation
- Type: General
- Religious affiliation: Catholic church

Services
- Beds: 175

History
- Opened: 1959

Links
- Website: www.eikwe-hospital.org
- Lists: Hospitals in Ghana

The St. Martin de Porres Hospital is a hospital in Eikwe, in the Western Region of Ghana. It is established in 1959 by the Archdiocese of Cape Coast and it is owned and managed by the Catholic Church of Ghana. In the 1930s the facilities served as a maternity home and orphanage.

There are also St. Martin de Porres hospitals in Agroyesum and Agormanya.
