= Cancer in Ghana =

Cancer in Ghana is an important cause of death and illness in Ghana, with current estimates indicating over 24,000 new cases each year. In 2020, 15,802 Ghanaians died from cancer. Nearly 95,000 cases of cancer were reported in Ghana in 2019. A 2015 study in Kumasi recorded breast and cervical cancer raked high records among females. Prostate cancer recorded the highest among males. Breast, liver and cervical were leading in both sexes.

== History ==
For many years, the mere mention of cancer was deemed a taboo in Ghana as it signals contamination or death.

The first cancer registry in Ghana was established in Kumasi as the first population-based cancer registry in 2012 to provide information on cancer cases.

== Treatment ==
Ghana has a national cancer control plan. However, cancer rates are in an increasing trend due to unpreparedness. The country is faced with limited cancer care and lack of cancer education for care workers. Top quality care is only offered in the two main tertiary hospital that are in the two major cities of Ghana. Cancer care costs are expensive which proves tough for patients at the advanced stages of cancer. These coupled with no health insurance cover for cancer and the competition with alternative medicine. The country has made some advances in relation with care facilities and treatments. There are occurrences of misdiagnoses and inability for patients to afford medication.

== Childhood cancer in Ghana ==
Over a thousand childhood cancer cases are recorded in the country each year. These cases are often reported late making treatment difficult and expensive. In 2022, four childhood cancers were covered under the National Health Insurance Scheme (NHIS): acute lymphoblastic leukaemia, Burkitt lymphoma, retinoblastoma, and Wilms tumour. Only 30% of children with cancer seek healthcare due to financial difficulties.

The country has two comprehensive Paediatric Oncology units at the Korle Bu and Komfo Anokye Teaching Hospitals. There are eight paediatric oncology fellows in training, three paediatric oncology pharmacists and 18 nurses in paediatric oncology.

In 2022 the first Lady of Ghana commissioned a hostel for children cancer patients to alleviate transportation costs in seeking health care.

The largest referral hospital in the country Korle bu has pledged to reduce childhood cancer by 2030 with a vision for every child patient to obtain equal access to treatment.

== Cancer by type ==
=== Breast and cervical cancer ===
Breast cancer is the most common cancer among females in Ghana. In 2020, there were 4400 cases of breast cancer and 2797 estimated cervical cancer cases. Over 3,000 women are diagnosed with cervical cancer each year and more than half of the figure die in Ghana. In 2018, it was estimated that over four thousand cases of breast cancer will be diagnosed and about 1800 women could die from cancer.

In Ghana, breast cancer is the leading malignancy. In 2007, breast cancer accounted for 15.4% of all malignancies, and this number increases annually. Roughly 70% of women who are diagnosed with breast cancer in Ghana are in the advanced stages of the disease. In addition, a recent study has shown that women in Ghana are more likely to be diagnosed with high-grade tumors that are negative for expression of the estrogen receptor, progesterone receptor, and the HER2/neu marker. These triple negative breast tumors are more aggressive and result in higher breast cancer mortality rates.

Explanations for the delayed presentation among women in Ghana have been traced to the cost of, and access to, routine screening mammography. Furthermore, women with breast cancer in Ghana describe a feeling of hopelessness and helplessness, largely due to their belief in fatalism, which contributes to denial as a means of coping. Mayo et al. (2003) concludes, however, that lack of awareness may be a more critical variable than fatalism in explaining health care decisions among women in Ghana.

==== Breast Cancer Initiatives in Ghana ====
Over the past decade, international delegations, governmental and nongovernmental organizations have started responding to the growing problem of breast cancer in Ghana.

===== The Breast Health Global Initiative, and Susan G. Komen for the Cure =====
The Breast Health Global Initiative, and Susan G. Komen for the Cure are helping to increase early detection and reduce the breast cancer mortality rate in the country. Through public education, awareness, training, and particularly promotion of early detection practices, international aid groups have helped in improving the situation in Ghana.

===== Rebecca Foundation, Ghana Health Service and Roche Ghana =====
In October 2022, the Rebecca Foundation, in partnership with Roche Ghana and Ghana Health Service, initiated an initiative to train more than 90 primary healthcare workers in the Eastern, Savannah, and Ashanti Regions to enhance early detection and treatment.

===== The Ghana Health Service and JHPIEGO, BEAT Breast Cancer Project =====
The BEAT Breast Cancer Project is a three-year initiative initiated by the Ghana Health Service (GHS) and JHPIEGO with the support of the Pfizer Foundation. The project is designed to enhance the early detection and treatment of breast cancer in Ghana and to be followed with a national awareness campaign.

The initiative will be implemented across 240 healthcare facilities in the Northern, Ashanti, and Greater Accra Regions. It comes after a pilot program in Bekwai that included breast and cervical cancer screenings and ran from June 2022 to July 2024.

The Acting Director-General of Ghana Health Service(GHS), Prof. Samuel Kaba Akoriyea, at the launch on Wednesday March 5, 2025, pledged full institutional support for the initiative. He declared his intention to mandate that all GHS facilities and Regional Directors observe World Breast Cancer Day. Additionally, he assigned the Health Promotion Division the responsibility of collaborating with JHPIEGO and the media to enhance public awareness. This initiative expands on previous efforts to improve breast cancer treatment in Ghana.

=== Liver cancer ===
Liver Cancer is the leading cause of cancer related deaths in the Volta Region of Ghana.

=== Prostate cancer ===
In 2020, Korlebu recorded over 1000 cases of prostate cancer. Most prostate cancer cases are often reported to the hospital at advanced stages due to reliance on herbal treatment.

== See also ==
- Healthcare in Ghana
