= West End Hospital, Kumasi =

West End Hospital, Ghana
- Ministry of Health

Geography
- Location: Kumasi, Kumasi Metropolis, Ashanti Region, Ghana
- Coordinates: 6.683546°N 1.643985°W

Organisation
- Funding: Private
- Type: General

Services
- Standards: NHIS accredited
- Emergency department: Yes
- Beds: 40

History
- Opened: 1978

Links
- Website: westend-hospital.com
- Lists: Hospitals in Ghana

The West End Hospital is a 40-bed private health care facility in Kumasi, Ghana. It is popularly known as the "Kwakye-Maafo Hospital" because of its distinguished services in fertility, obstetrics and gynaecology by the founder, Dr. J.K. Kwakye-Maafo, a medical practitioner and former president of the Ghana Medical Association.

== History ==
West End Hospital (named after the famous Westend Klinikum in West Berlin, Germany) was established in 1978 as a clinic. By 1985 it had grown into a hospital providing various in-patient and out-patient services to the Kumasi metropolis in the Ashanti region of Ghana. It is located at Patasi, opposite the police depot in Kumasi, the capital of the Ashanti Region. It has over 40 staff.

== Departments and facilities ==
- General medicine
- Paediatrics
- General surgery
- Obstetrics and gynaecology/ultrasound
- ECG services
- EPI programmes
- MCH services
- Family planning/voluntary counselling
- Pharmaceutical services
- Laboratory and diagnostic services
- Healthcare services training

== See also ==
- Komfo Anokye Teaching Hospital
- National Health Insurance Scheme (Ghana)
- List of hospitals in Ghana
