= Tamale West Hospital =

Hospital in Tamale Ghana

Geography
- Location: Tamale, Northern Region, Ghana

Organisation
- Care system: Government

Links
- Lists: Hospitals in Ghana

Tamale West Hospital, located in Tamale, Ghana, is a government healthcare institution serving the Tamale community and its surrounding areas.

== History ==
Tamale West Hospital commenced its operations as a polyclinic in April 1998 and swiftly transitioned to a district hospital within the same year. As of 2024, it is a referral center for the Tamale Metro sub-district health facilities. The hospital offers 24-hour services across seven functional wards: Male, Maternity, Labour, Emergency, Children, Female, and Surgical wards.

== Facilities ==
Facilities include:

- Newborn care unit. In November 2021, UNICEF built a 54-bed newborn care unit for the hospital to provide better healthcare services to newborn babies and mothers, and to enhance general healthcare.
- Maternity ward
- Labour room
- Theatre
- Pharmacy
- Eye clinic
