= Viting =

Vitting (Viting) is a community in Tamale Metropolitan District in the Northern Region of Ghana. It is located on the Tamale- Yendi or Salaga road, few meters after the Tamale Teaching Hospital. Vitting (Viting) is one of the main communities in the Tamale South Constituency. It is represented in Ghana's Parliament by Honourable Haruna Iddrisu.

== Key Landmarks ==
- Vitting Senior High Technical School
- Abubakari Sadiq Senior High School
- Sabonkudi Estates
- Ganaa Hotel
- Al-Saadi Senior High School
- Anbariya Senior High School
- Vitting Dam

== See also ==
- Suburbs of Tamale (Ghana) metropolis
