= Nana Kwaku Bonsam =

Ghanaian witch doctor and fetish priest

- Born: Stephen Osei Mensah; 20 August 1973 (age 53); Afrancho, Ashanti, Ghana
- Occupation: Traditional priest

Nana Kwaku Bonsam (born 20 August 1973), whose name, "Bonsam" translates to "Devil", is a well known Ghanaian witch doctor and fetish priest.

Bonsam gained international notoriety when he claimed to put a curse on the Portuguese footballer Cristiano Ronaldo. Before taking his present name, he was originally called Stephen Osei Mensah, a member of the Seventh-day Adventist Church in the village of Afrancho. In 1992, when he was aged 19, he suffered severe burns in a gas explosion, after which his life underwent a transformation. The controversial priest also claimed, in a self-made video, that he was responsible for the death of Pastor TB Joshua, after he was fought spiritually.

During the 2026 FIFA World Cup, Bonsam claimed to disrupt Harry Kane's performance against Ghana. In the 85th minute of the England vs Ghana match, Harry Kane missed a 'sitter' rebounded onto him after Nico O'Reilly's header hit the woodwork. This caused people on social media to question Bonsam if he really did curse Harry Kane, or if it was guesswork. Bonsam later told LBC News that Harry Kane's curse has been lifted, and he is now free to score. Harry Kane would go on to score a goal in the next match he played, as well as a further two against DR Congo. He would later predict that Argentina would be eliminated against Cabo Verde, a match in which he had said Lionel Messi had “exhausted” all the goals that he was meant to score in the tournament. This proved incorrect, as Messi would go on to score the first goal of that match, which ultimately ended 3-2 to Argentina at extra time.
