= Abeka-Lapaz =

Abeka-Lapaz Lapaz-Kisseiman
- Urban area
- Location within Ghana
- Coordinates: 05°36′23″N 00°15′05″W
- Country: Ghana
- Region: Greater Accra Region
- District: Accra Metropolitan
- Elevation: 187 ft (57 m)
- Time zone: GMT
  - Summer (DST): GMT

Abeka-Lapaz is an urban area in the Accra Metropolitan district, a district of the Greater Accra Region of Ghana. It has a market called Abeka market.

== Construction of the Abeka Lapaz Footbridge ==
The Department of Urban Roads has announced a temporal traffic disruption on the Abeka Lapaz section of the N1 in order to facilitate the construction of a pedestrian footbridge. The construction was scheduled to take place on from Saturday, March 1, to Monday, March 3, 2025, it was timed at 10:00pm and 3:00am each night. During these hours, one side of the carriageway was partially closed to allow the contractor to position a crane and lift the bridge's bow into place The project was jointly financed by the Bloomberg Philanthropies Initiative for Global Road Safety, the Partnership for Healthy Cities, and the Accra Metropolitan Assembly (BIGRS-AMA) at a cost of US$120,000 and was completed within one month.

== Abeka-Lapaz gutters filled with filth ==
Reports indicate that a significant number of residents in Abeka Lapaz and nearby areas dispose of waste in open gutters. The drains located in front of residential buildings, commercial outlets, containers, and bus stops are frequently filled with refuse, which obstructs the flow of waste water and rainwater. During rainfall, waste from the gutters is often carried to other locations where it accumulates and attracts flies, increasing the risk of infectious and communicable diseases. Residents of Abeka Market, Free Pipes, Fadama Junction, and Nii Boi Town have expressed concern over gutters clogged with refuse, noting that the situation has led to a rise in mosquito populations and a corresponding higher risk of malaria. Traders selling fresh fish and other foodstuffs along the streets in these areas have also reported reduced patronage, attributing it to the increased presence of flies caused by the unsanitary conditions.
