= Manso Nkwanta =

- Town and District Capital
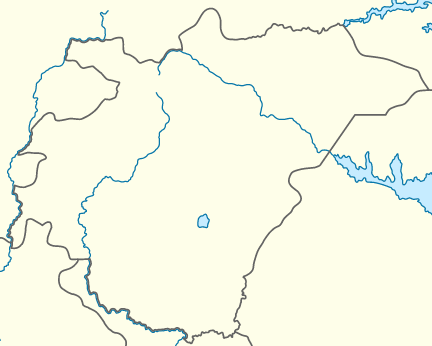
- Location of Manso Nkwanta within Ashanti
- Coordinates: 6°28′N 1°53′W
- Sovereign state: Ghana
- Region: Ashanti
- District: Amansie West
- Elevation: 712 ft (217 m)
- Time zone: GMT
  - Summer (DST): GMT
- Website: mansonkwanta.com

Manso Nkwanta is a small town and is the capital of Amansie West, a district in the Ashanti Region of Ghana.
