= Manna Mission Hospital =

Hospital in Greater Accra, Ghana

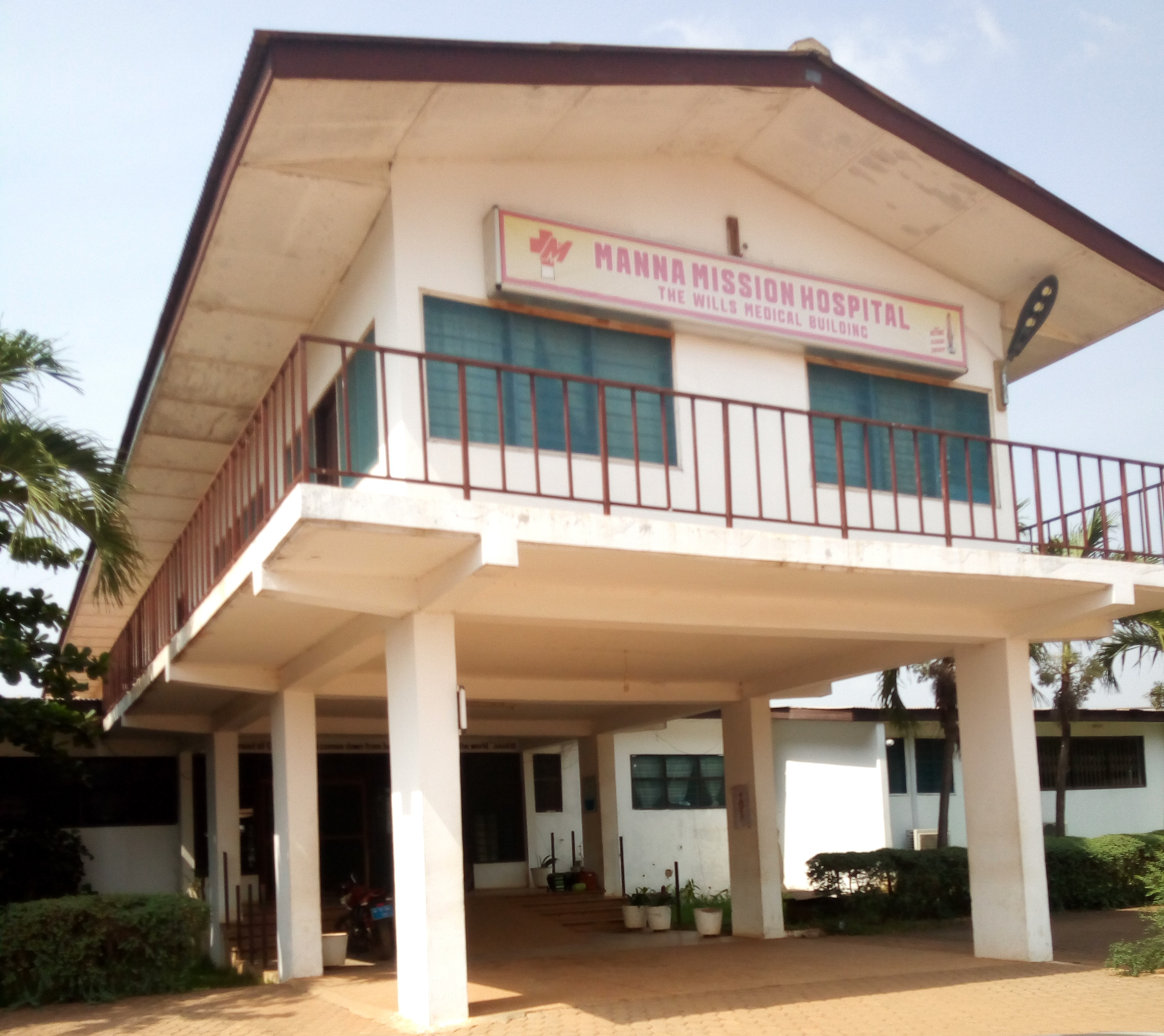
- Hospital

Geography
- Location: Teshie, Greater Accra, Ghana

Links
- Website: http://www.mannaminc.org
- Lists: Hospitals in Ghana

Manna Mission Hospital is a private health institution in Teshie, Greater Accra, Ghana.

== Donation ==
The H4P (Here for Perfection) Organization donated to the Christina Hackman Wards at Manna Mission Hospital in Teshie to celebrate their thirteenth anniversary.

The Manna Nursing College in Teshie, Accra, has been commissioned by the Manna Mission Incorporated to support the nation's provision of Christ-centered professional nursing education.

The Manna Nursing College operates in collaboration with the Oral Robert’s University’s Anna Vaughn College of Nursing in the USA.
