= The Trust Hospital =

Geography
- Location: Osu, Greater Accra Region, Ghana

Organisation
- Type: General

Services
- Emergency department: Yes
- Beds: 124

History
- Founded: 1992

Links
- Website: www.thetrusthospital.com

The Trust Hospital, also known as The Trust Hospital Company Limited, is a Ghanaian healthcare facility that used to provide healthcare services to the staff of SSNIT and their dependants. It was later upgraded to a full-fledged hospital to extend their services to the general public. The Trust Hospital engages in a number of health screening activities including Breast Cancer Awareness campaigns for the general public through partnership with other private organizations.

== History ==
The Trust Hospital was established in 1992 as a not-for-profit healthcare facility exclusively for SSNIT staff, before eventually becoming a fully-fledged hospital and extended its services to the public.

The Trust Hospital was incorporated in November 2010 as The Trust Hospital Company Limited in Ghana. The Trust Hospital Company Limited has three hospitals: The Trust Hospital, The Trust Specialist Hospital and the Trust Mother and Child Hospital and six satellite clinics.

The Trust Hospital appointed Dr. Mrs. Juliana Oye Ameh as its first chief executive officer, since the hospital was broken off from the mother company SSNIT in January 2013. She served a five-year term from April 2020 to May 2025.

Since June 2025, following the departure of Dr. Ameh, the hospital has been managed by Henry Shirazu Alhassan, PhD, who serves as Supervising Director (Acting Chief Executive Officer).

As of November 2025, the hospital is governed by a new set of Board of Directors chaired by Ambassador Edith Hazel with other members being Mr. Ernest Nunoo, Sharif Mahmud Khalid, PhD, Dr. Emmanuel Kojo Jones Mensah, and Henry Shirazu Alhassan, PhD.

== Locations ==
=== Hospitals ===
The Trust Hospital Company Limited has five hospitals;

1. The Trust Hospital - Osu
2. The Trust Specialist Hospital - Osu
3. The Trust Hospital Premium Centre - Osu
4. The Trust Mother and Child Hospital - Osu

=== Clinics ===
The Trust Clinics are community-based clinics with ultra-modern facilities and experienced health professionals. These clinics are National Health Insurance Scheme (NHIS) accredited and clients can assess healthcare by using the NHIS card.

1. The Trust Clinic - Tema
2. The Trust Clinic - Sakumono
3. The Trust Clinic - Adenta
4. The Trust Clinic - Dome
5. The Trust Clinic - Adabraka
6. The Trust Clinic – Dansoman

== Facilities ==
In 2014 The Trust Hospital Company Limited inaugurated a maternal and infant clinic at Osu in Accra called “Mother and Child Hospital,” which assists in providing quality and safe medical care to women and children. The hospital has a colposcope to help with the treatment of cervical cancer in Ghana. The colposcope is a machine that can visualize the cervix and determine changes that are likely to pose a threat to the cervix.

In 2018 The Trust Hospital converted to an Electronic Medical Record (EMR) system which serves as a network system that connects all their three hospitals and six clinics across the country. During the outbreak of COVID-19 they introduced a new service called The Trust Hospital Telemedicine Service which allowed them serve their clients at home or in the office during the pandemic.
