= La General Hospital =

Geography
- Location: La, Greater Accra, Ghana
- Coordinates: 5.55540°N 0.16650°W

Organisation
- Type: General

Services
- Emergency department: Yes

Links
- Lists: Hospitals in Ghana

The La General Hospital is a hospital located in the La area of Accra, Ghana. It was formerly known as La Polyclinic.

La General Hospital was established to provide healthcare to the general public in and around Accra, the capital city of Ghana.

President Nana Addo Dankwa Akufo-Addo kicked off the redevelopment of the La General Hospital in Accra on Tuesday, marking the beginning of a transformation for the healthcare facility. This project aims to upgrade the healthcare into a modern 160 facility which will compliment the Greater Accra Regional Hospital at Ridge.
