= Achimota Hospital =

Hospital in Ghana

- Ministry of Health

Geography
- Location: Achimota, Okaikwei North Municipal District, Greater Accra Region, Ghana

Organisation
- Care system: Public - Ghana Health Service

Services
- Emergency department: Yes

Links
- Website: Achimota Hospital

Achimota Hospital (also known as Achimota Government Hospital, or Achimota District Hospital, or Achimota Municipal Hospital) is a healthcare facility located in Achimota, a suburb of Accra in the Okaikoi North District in the Greater Accra Region of Ghana. The hospital serves more than 10 communities which includes Achimota, Kissieman, Ofankor, Pokuase, Haatso, Lapaz, Dome and Amasaman.

== History ==
The hospital was established in 1927 by the Achimota School authorities after the establishment of the school in 1917.

As at 2015, the Disease Control officer was Mr Michael Alexander Garr and the Administrator of the hospital was Mr Atindaana N. Nsobila. The Medical Superintendent of the hospital was Dr Mildred B. Kumassah.

As at 2020, the Acting Medical Superintendent of the hospital was Dr Salamatu Attah Nantogma.

As at 2025, the Administrator of the hospital was Bernard Fiifi Polley.

== Facilities ==
The hospital has the Children's Outpatient Department, the general OPD and washrooms. It also has an ultramodern emergency block with male, female and children wards, a paediatric unit, a pharmacy, doctor and nurse rest room and an accounts office.

== Controversy ==
In September 2021, Akosua Agyapong allegedly accused a doctor at the hospital of delays leading to the death of Nana Ampadu.

== Initiative ==
In 2025, the hospital partnered with Reflo Company Limited to screen and educate women on cervical cancer.

== Donations ==
In 2020, the Melcom Care Foundation donated office furniture to the hospital.

In 2023, Mr. Mac-Reuben Kumah, the Chief Executive Officer and Managing Director of G7 Security Systems Limited donated items to the hospital.

In 2024, SHEROES Global donated items to newborns at the hospital.
