= St John's Hospital & Fertility Centre =

Private hospital in Accra, Ghana

- Ministry of Health

Geography
- Location: Accra, Accra Metropolis District, Greater Accra Region, Ghana

Organisation
- Care system: Private - Ghana Health Service

History
- Founded: 23 November 2012

Links
- Lists: Hospitals in Ghana

St John's Hospital & Fertility Centre is a private healthcare facility located at Tantra Hill Roundabout in Accra. As at 2020, the chief executive officer of the centre is Dr Maame Yaa Afriye.

== History ==
The hospital was established in November 2012.

== Controversy ==
In 2023, the GNA published a story claiming a woman who had lost a baby after delivery sued the centre. The facility dismissed the allegations and gave the news agency a deadline to retract and apologize for their publication.

== Awards ==
In August 2025, the centre was honoured at the 2025 National Governance and Business Leadership Awards. It was also honoured as the Healthcare Provider of the Year at the 8th Ghana Business Awards. It was also crowned the Hospital of the Year at the 2025 8th Ghana West Africa Business Excellence Awards.

In 2024, the hospital was recognized at the 2024 Corporate Hall of Fame Awards. The hospital was also recognized at the 2024 Ghana Business League Awards (GBLA).

In 2023, the hospital won the Outstanding Private Specialist of the Year (Gynaecology) and the Fertility Hospital Brand of the Year from Ghana Corporate BRANDS Awards.

In 2022, the hospital won the Ultramodern Medical Facility of the Year from Ghana-West Africa Excellence Awards and the Best Community Involvement Hospital from West Africa Excellence Healthcare Awards.

In 2021, the hospital won the Trusted Women & Fertility Hospital of the Year and the Customers’ Choice Fertility Centre of the Year. It also won the Private Health Facility of the Year award organised by CIMG.

In 2020, the hospital won the CIMG Award for Best Private Hospital. The hospital also won two awards at the 2nd Health, Environment, Safety & Security Awards.

== Donation ==
In May 2026, the hospital donated an amount of GHS 55,800 to aid in the tiling of a dining hall at the Regional Police Training School in Kumasi.
