= Emmanuel Boakye =

Ghanaian-Dutch professional footballer

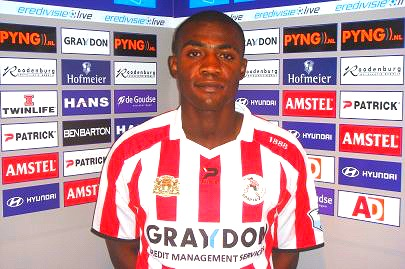

Personal information
- Full name: Emmanuel Kwame Agyemang Boakye
- Date of birth: 25 March 1985 (age 41)
- Place of birth: Ejura, Ahodwo family, Ghana
- Height: 1.75 m (5 ft 9 in)
- Positions: Midfielder; defender

Team information
- Current team: Coaching, Scouting

Youth career
- 1993–1996: HSV Zuidvogels
- 1996–2000: FC Utrecht
- 2000–2005: AFC Ajax

Senior career*
Years	Team	Apps	(Gls)
2005–2007	Ajax	6	(0)
2006–2007	→ Heracles (loan)	30	(0)
2007–2009	Heracles	61	(1)
2009–2012	Sparta	74	(0)
2013–2014	Mura 05	10	(0)
2014–2015	Åtvidaberg	15	(0)
2015–2016	Lerums IS	4	(0)
- Asante Kotoko

International career^{‡}
2007	Ghana U23	2	(0)
- * Club domestic league appearances and goals as of 30 September 2012 ‡ National team caps and goals as of 30 May 2007

Emmanuel Kwame "Ymma" Agyeman Boakye (born 25 March 1985) is a Ghanaian-Dutch former professional footballer.

Boakye played for Dutch clubs Sparta Rotterdam, Heracles Almelo and AFC Ajax, Slovenian side ND Mura 05, Åtvidabergs FF in Sweden and most recently the Ghanaian team Kumasi Asante Kotoko coaching and management.

== Club career ==
A strong, confident and aggressive attacking right wingback, with much speed and skill, Boakye moved to the Netherlands in 1993, and played for amateur side Zuidvogels (from the town of Huizen) as a child and moved to FC Utrecht youth as a teenager. Ajax scouts discovered him in 2000. The defender, who can play as a right fullback but also in the center of defense, joined the Ajax B1 youth team in 2000.

=== AFC Ajax ===
Boakye was first added to the Ajax-1 squad in the fall of 2005 by head-coach Danny Blind, as many Ajax defenders were injured or suspended at the time. The youngster made his first team début on 24 September 2005 in the Eredivisie home game against Roda JC. In total, Emmanuel Boakye had six appearances for Ajax in the Eredivisie, plus another four in the post-season Eredivisie play-offs and one in the Dutch Cup competition.

Ajax offered the player a contract renewal in April 2006, and the Ghanaian started the new season with the first squad, but at the end of the pre-season campaign Ajax and the player agreed that a transfer on loan would be best for his development. Boakye was soon linked with two Eredivisie outfits. When Sparta Rotterdam lost interest the choice for Heracles Almelo was easily made.

=== Heracles ===
On 10 August 2006, Ajax defender Boakye was loaned out to Eredivisie side Heracles Almelo for the remainder of the 2006–2007 season, officially until 30 June 2007. Ajax and Heracles agreed a one-year loan deal, effective immediately. The Ghanaian defender extended his Ajax contract until 2008 in April 2006, but would not have seen much action in Amsterdam this season, with defenders such as Jaap Stam, Thomas Vermaelen, Johnny Heitinga and George Ogăraru above him in Henk ten Cate's pecking order.

On 18 June 2007, Boakye made his loan move permanent, sealing a three-year deal with Heracles Almelo from rivals Ajax Amsterdam. He made 61 appearances whilst on loan at Heracles. "We are extremely happy that we could sign such a young and good defender for three years," Heracles Almelo director Nico Jan Hoogma said. "The competition for him was fierce but we nevertheless managed to do it." Boakye opted for Almelo despite offers from Feyenoord, AZ Alkmaar and SC Heerenveen.

In June 2009, Boakye signed for Sparta Rotterdam, on a 2-year contract. He played with teammates such as Kevin Strootman, Nick Viergever, Donovan Slijngaard, Eduardo Duplan, Arne Slot, and played there until 2011 when he was released by the club after being injured for a year. In summer 2014, Boakye joined Swedish side Åtvidaberg from Slovenian club Mura 05.

== International career ==
Boakye holds both Ghanaian and Dutch citizenship. He has opted to represent the national team of Ghana.

On 19 January 2007, Boakye was called up by Ghana Olympic coach Jones Attuquayefio into the Ghana Olympic squad for a qualifying matches against Burkina Faso's Olympic team and Nigeria in the qualification for the 2008 Summer Olympics. He's a potential player for Ghana Black stars.

== Major honors ==
- KNVB Cup || 1x || 2005/06
- Johan Cruijff Schaal || 1x || 2006
