= Kortwia-Abodom =

- Village
- Location within Ghana
- Coordinates: 6°25′N 1°49′W
- Country: Ghana
- Region: Ashanti Region
- District: Amansie West District
- Elevation: 597 ft (182 m)
- Time zone: GMT
  - Summer (DST): GMT

Kortwia-Abodom is a village in the Amansie West district, a district in the Ashanti Region of Ghana.
