= Tamale Teaching Hospital =

- Ministry of Health

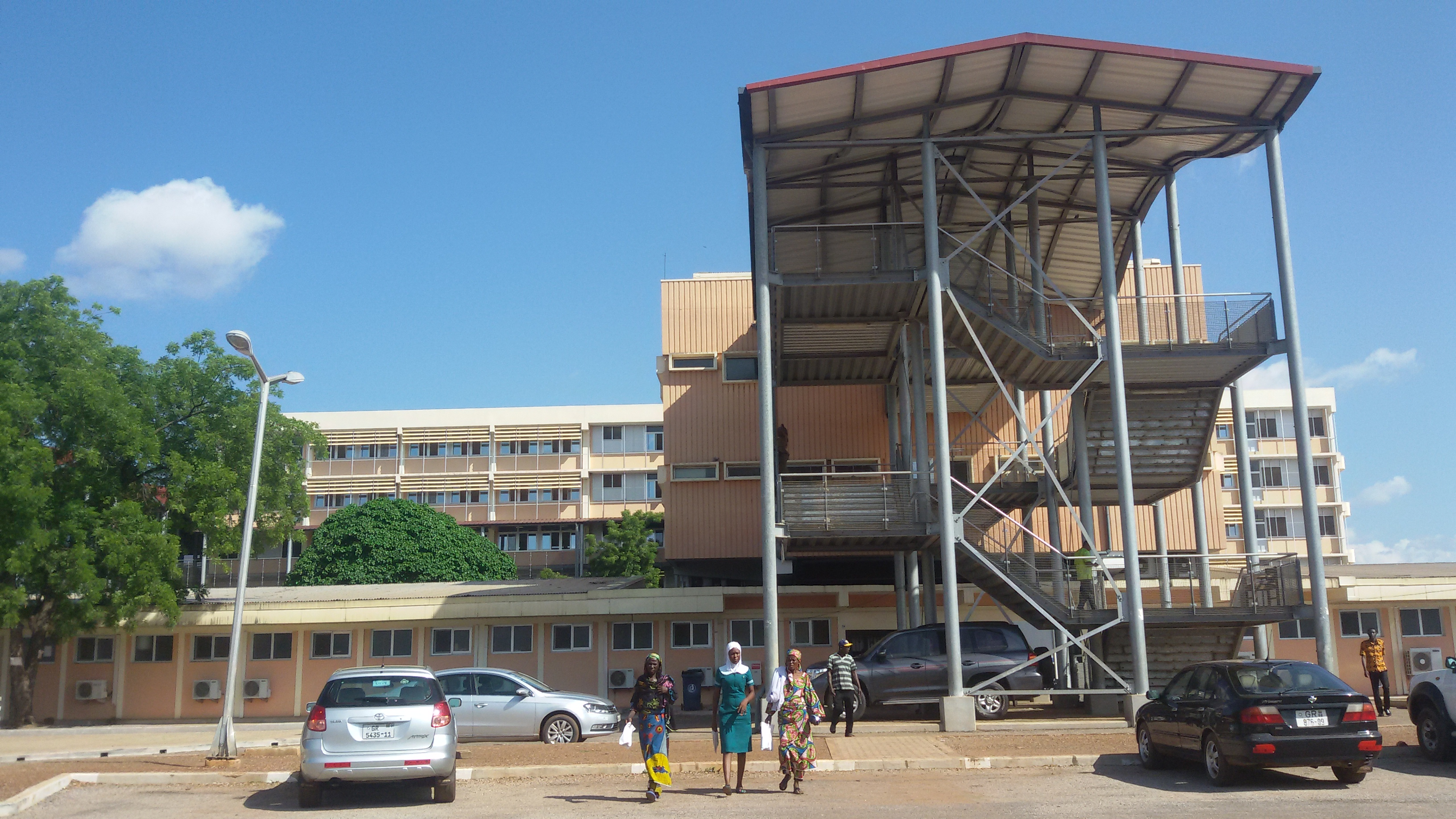

Geography
- Location: Tamale, Northern Region, Ghana
- Coordinates: 9.393273°N 0.823513°W

Organisation
- Care system: Public - Ghana Health Service
- Type: Teaching
- Affiliated university: University for Development Studies

Services
- Emergency department: Yes

History
- Founded: 1974

Links
- Website: www.tth.gov.gh
- Lists: Hospitals in Ghana

The Tamale Teaching Hospitalis a teaching hospital in Tamale in the Northern region and the third largest hospital in Ghana. It serves as a referral hospital for the five northern regions of Ghana. It cooperates with the University for Development Studies in Northern Ghana to offer undergraduate and graduate programs in medicine, nursing, and nutrition. It is the third teaching hospital in Ghana after the Korle Bu Teaching Hospital and the Komfo Anokye Teaching Hospital.

The northern region of Ghana's tertiary referral centre is Tamale Teaching Hospital. With a total population of 5,203,838. it serves the five northern areas of Ghana (Northern Region, Savanah Region, North East Region, Upper East Region, and Upper West Region). The Tamale metropolitan is home to the University for Development Studies, the School of Medicine, and the Tamale Teaching Hospital. There are an estimated 612,000 people living in the city.

== History ==
The hospital was established in 1974 and was formerly known as the Tamale Regional Hospital. It was to provide various health care services to the people of the three Northern regions of Ghana namely, the Northern, Upper East and Upper West regions.

== Teaching hospital status ==
In 2005 the Northern Regional Coordinating Council decided to partner the Ghana Health Service to upgrade the hospital to the status of a Teaching Hospital. The upgrade made the hospital the third teaching hospital in the country. The upgrade was to help with the training of health professionals from the University of Development Studies.

== Mandate ==
The mandate of the hospital is set by Act 525 of the Ghana Health Service and Teaching Hospitals Act of 1996. The stipulations of the mandate empowers the hospital to function in three critical areas namely, the provision of advanced clinical health services, supporting the training of undergraduates and postgraduates in medical sciences and finally, undertaking research into health issues for the purpose of improving health care.

== Educational Role ==
Affiliated with the University for Development Studies (UDS), TTH plays a crucial role in training healthcare professionals. It collaborates with UDS to offer undergraduate and postgraduate programs in medicine, nursing, and nutrition. This partnership aims to address the shortage of healthcare professionals in Northern Ghana and beyond.

== Research and Development ==
TTH is an active participant in medical research, focusing on improving healthcare outcomes in the region. As the Ghana Hub for the NIHR Global Health Research Unit on Global Surgery, the hospital collaborates on various international research projects to enhance surgical care and outcomes.

== Infrastructural Development ==
In 2016, TTH expanded its facilities with the commissioning of Phase II, a €39 million project that added a 400-bed complex. This development increased the hospital's total bed capacity to 800.

The hospital in 2012 had a donation of 335,000 Ghana cedis for the construction of a Neonatal Intensive Care Unit (NICU). The donation from MTN Ghana was in response to a need identified by Lord Paul Boateng and his wife when the visited the hospital in 2011. The completed units as of July 2015 have facilities to serve forty neonates and their mothers. It also contains office spaces as well as students' learning areas. The hospital secured a dedicated power cable from Akosombo to supply them with uninterpreted electricity.

== Governing Board ==
An 11-member governing body for the Tamale Teaching Hospital was inaugurated on 28 February 2019.

The members of the board include Mr. Mahmoud Hamid (Chairman), Dr. David Zawumya Kolbilla, Prof. Francis A. Abantanga, Mr. George A. Atampugre, Dr. Abass Adam, Mrs. Dangnikuu Evelyn-Eda. Others are Mr. Kuuri Karim, Pham. Hamid Abdulai, Nana Agyei Mensah, Justice Eric Baah and Clara Tia Sulemana.

In April 2025, Dr. Abubakari Bawah Abdulai was appointed as the newly CEO of the Hospital succeeding Dr. Adam Atiku who was appointed in 2023 to continue the improvement of medical cares.
