= Kasei, Ghana =

Kasei Kasi
- Village
- Location within Ghana
- Coordinates: 6°39′N 1°37′W
- Country: Ghana
- Region: Ashanti Region
- District: Ejura/Sekyedumase
- Elevation: 827 ft (252 m)
- Time zone: GMT
  - Summer (DST): GMT

Kasei is a village in the Ejura/Sekyedumase district, a district in the Ashanti Region of Ghana. In November 2015, former Ghanaian President John Dramani Mahama stated a school with 24 classrooms and other facilities would be built in Kasei. There is a modern hospital located in Kasei called St. Luke's Hospital.
