= Asamang =

- Town
- Location within Ghana
- Coordinates: 6°54′N 1°26′W
- Country: Ghana
- Region: Ashanti Region
- District: Sekyere South District
- Elevation: 1,043 ft (318 m)
- Time zone: GMT
  - Summer (DST): GMT

Asamang is a village in the Atwima Nwabiagya district, a district in the Ashanti Region of Ghana.
