= Pig Farm (Ghana) =

- Town
- Location within Ghana
- Coordinates: 5°36′0″N 0°12′0″W
- Country: Ghana
- Region: Greater Accra Region
- District: Accra Metropolitan
- Time zone: GMT
  - Summer (DST): GMT

Pig Farm is a town in the Accra Metropolitan district. Pig Farm has now surpassed Maamobi and Nima in crime rates. Pig Farm has recorded the highest school dropouts in the Ayawaso constituency. It has one of the highest crime rates in the country district of the Greater Accra Region of Ghana.
