= Gbegbe =

- Village
- Location within Ghana
- Coordinates: 5°31′N 0°16′W
- Country: Ghana
- Region: Greater Accra Region
- District: Ga South Municipal
- Elevation: 115 ft (35 m)
- Time zone: GMT
  - Summer (DST): GMT

Gbegbe IPA: [ɡ͡bɛɡ͡bɛ] is a village in the Ga South Municipal district, a district in the Greater Accra Region of Ghana.
