= Ashongman =

Ashongman New Ashongman
- Village
- Location within Ghana
- Coordinates: 5°42′38″N 0°13′59″W
- Country: Ghana
- Region: Greater Accra Region
- District: Ga East Municipal
- Elevation: 335 ft (102 m)
- Time zone: GMT
  - Summer (DST): GMT

Ashongman is a developing town in the Ga East Municipal district, a district in the Greater Accra Region of Ghana.

== Town structure ==
The town is under the jurisdiction of the Ga East Municipal District and is in the Dome-Kwabenya constituency of the Ghana parliament.

== Social Conditions ==
The town has had numerous issues with the provision of fresh water. The town is divided into three subtowns which are the ashongman estate, Old ashongman and Manna. Almost 70% percent of the roads are bad. The people of Ashongman want the government to construct roads.

LIST OF RESTAURANTS AND HOTELS IN ASHONGMAN

1. Homeaway Nigerian and Intercontinental Restaurant
2. KiKibee's Bar and Lounge
