= Wiamoase =

- Village
- Location within Ghana
- Coordinates: 7°04′N 1°32′W
- Country: Ghana
- Region: Ashanti Region
- District: Sekyere South District
- Elevation: 1,079 ft (329 m)
- Time zone: GMT
  - Summer (DST): GMT

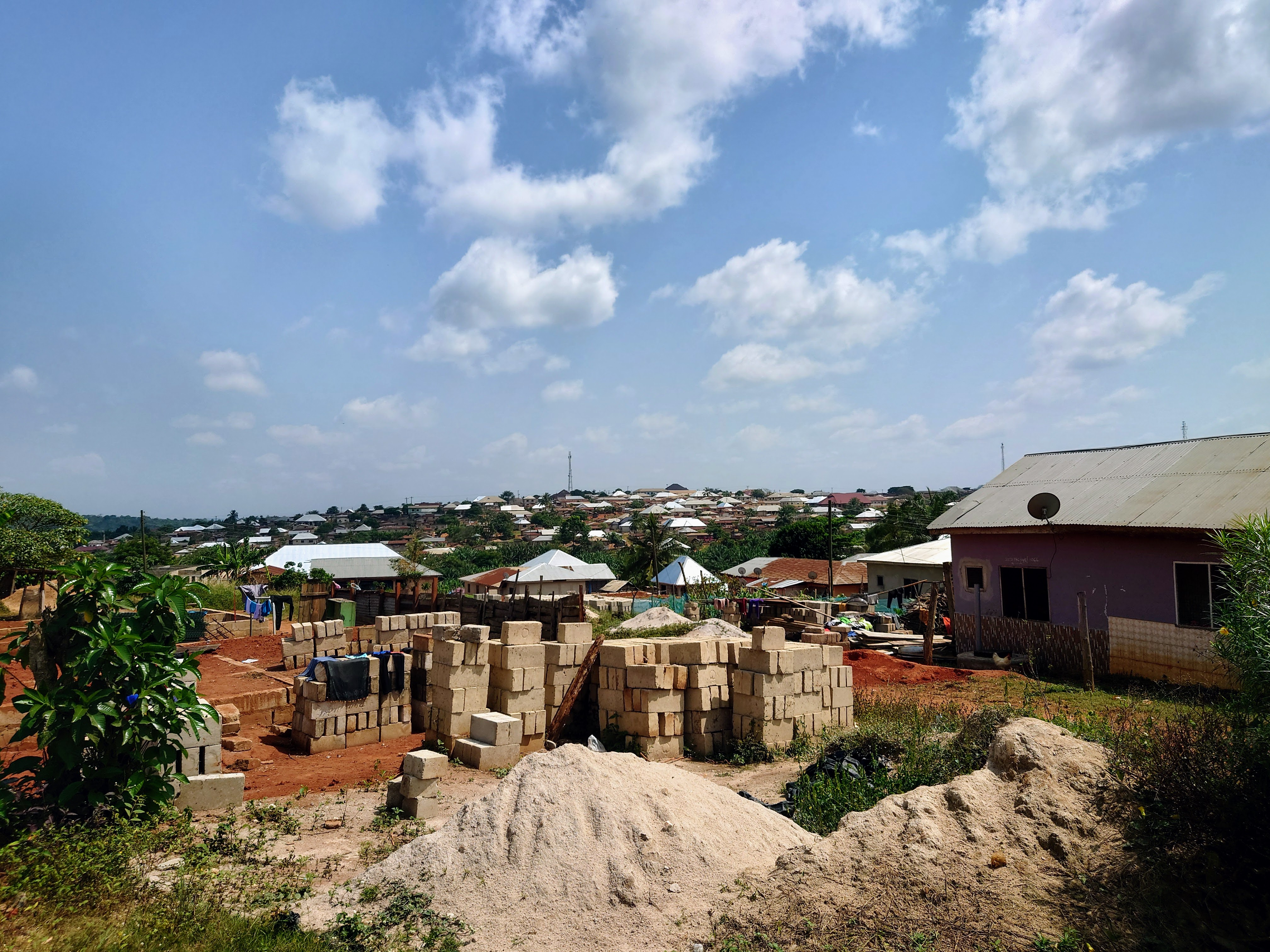
This is a picture of the small town of Wiamoase, taken in early December 2022

Wiamoase is a town in the Sekyere South district, a district in the Ashanti Region of Ghana.

== Education ==
Wiamoase is known for the Okomfo Anokye Secondary Secondary School. The school is a second cycle institution.

== Healthcare ==
The Seventh-Day Adventist Hospital is located in Wiamoase.
