= Narhbita School of Nursing =

Nursing school in Greater Accra, Ghana

The Narhbita School of Nursing is private tertiary health institution in Tema in the Greater Accra Region of Ghana. Established in the year 2008 (17 years ago), the college can be traced to the Narh-Bita Clinic which was opened in 1979 (46 years ago). As the clinic developed to take on greater responsibilities, it was upgraded to the status of a hospital and named the Narh-Bita Hospital in 1987. The problem of shortage of health-workers, including nurses, moved the proprietors of the hospital to establish a School of Nursing to feed Narh-Bita and other health institutions.

The academic programme of the School is directed and supervised by the Nurses' and Midwives' Council for Ghana, while the University of Ghana is the mentor university. The need to run more programmes in the health sector caused the change of name from School of Nursing to Narh-Bita College. The School of Nursing continues to function as a component part of the college. Under the umbrella of the college, the following programmes are featured: Diploma in Nursing, Medical Laboratory Technology, Advanced Diploma in Medical Assistantship and Certificate for Health Assistant Clinical (HAC).

"The College has satisfied the operational conditions and therefore has been duly registered and accredited by the Registrar General's Department and the National Accreditation Board respectively."

Genealogically, the Clinic gave birth to the Hospital out of which came the School of Nursing, then finally the college emerged as a “great-grand child” of the Clinic. Analysing the whole matter it can be said that the desire to help solve the problem of shortage of health workers is the reason for the establishment of the college. The various phases in the development of the institutions are the brainchild of Dr and Mrs Narh and a few well-wishers, who always assert that the innovations are the outcome of divine inspiration.

The college has able administrators, hard-working staff, both teaching and non-teaching, an up-to-date library, a computer laboratory and adequate equipment. Available facilities at the college enhance teaching and learning, as students also enjoy opportunities that promote successful training career. The college is in the Tema Metropolitan Assembly. The activities of the institution is supervised by the Ministry of Education. The University of Ghana awards a Diploma in Nursing after students from the institution have successfully completed a three-year nursing training programme. The institution is accredited by the National Accreditation Board. The Nurses and Midwifery Council (NMC) is the body that regulates the activities, curriculum and examination of the college. The council's mandate Is enshrined under section 4(1) of N.R.C.D 117.
