= Onwe =

Onwe Onwi
- Town
- Location within Ghana
- Coordinates: 6°32′N 1°30′W
- Country: Ghana
- Region: Ashanti Region
- District: Ejisu Municipal
- Elevation: 778 ft (237 m)
- Time zone: GMT
  - Summer (DST): GMT

Onwe is a town in the Ejisu Municipal, a district in the Ashanti Region of Ghana.
