= Lapaz (Accra) =

Coordinates: 5°36′N 0°15′W

- Town
- Location within Ghana
- Country: Ghana
- Region: Greater Accra Region
- District: Accra Metropolitan
- Time zone: GMT
  - Summer (DST): GMT

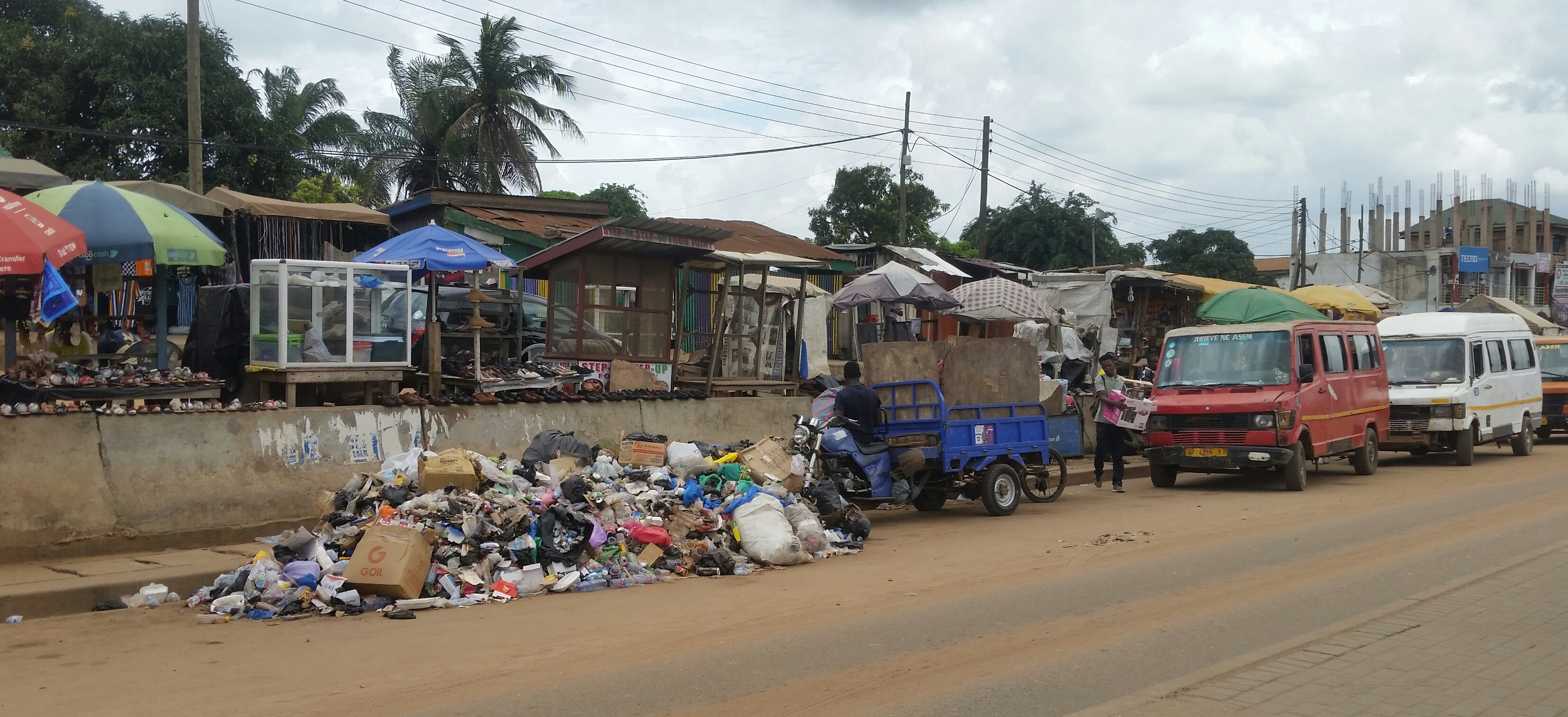
Wrongly dumped refuse at Lapaz.

Lapaz is a town in the Accra Metropolitan district, a district of the Greater Accra Region of Ghana. The name Lapaz was adopted from a now defunct hotel, Hotel de Lapaz, which was the first hotel in the area.

Some notable Ghanaians who have resided in Lapaz are :

- K.K. Kabobo - a Ghanaian highlife musician
- Amakye Dede - a prominent Ghanaian highlife musician
- Nana Ampadu - a prominent and pioneering Ghanaian highlife musician

Some notable establishments in Lapaz are :

- The Abrantie Spot - A popular lounge and live music spot (owned by Amakye Dede)
- St. Michael's Specialist Hospital, Lapaz (privately owned Hospital)
