= Ankasi =

Ankaase Ankaase
- Village
- Location within Ghana
- Coordinates: 6°51′N 1°33′W
- Country: Ghana
- Region: Ashanti Region
- District: Afigya Kwabre South District
- Elevation: 1,027 ft (313 m)
- Time zone: GMT
  - Summer (DST): GMT

Ankaase is a village in the Afigya Kwabre South District, a district in the Ashanti Region of Ghana.
