= Agormanya =

Agormanya Agomanya
- Town
- Location within Ghana
- Coordinates: 6°9′N 0°1′W
- Country: Ghana
- Region: Eastern Region
- District: Lower Manya Krobo District
- Elevation: 230 ft (70 m)
- Time zone: GMT
  - Summer (DST): GMT

Agormanya is a small town in the Lower Manya Krobo Municipal District of the Eastern Region of Ghana.

== Agormanya Market ==
The town hosts the main market for the people in Odumase Krobo and its environs. The major market days are Wednesday and Saturday.

== Commissioning of 188 unit stores market complex ==
On 26 November, 2024, Martin Adjei-Mensah Korsah, the Minister for Local Government, Decentralization and Rural Development, has inaugurated a new market complex with 188 units in Agormanya, This modern Agormanya market, equipped with advanced facilities, is anticipated to greatly boost trading activities in Odumase Krobo and the surrounding areas.
