= Dominase =

Dominase Dominasi
- Village
- Location within Ghana
- Coordinates: 6°12′N 1°41′W
- Country: Ghana
- Region: Ashanti Region
- District: Bekwai Municipal District
- Elevation: 650 ft (198 m)
- Time zone: GMT
  - Summer (DST): GMT

Dominase is a village in the Bekwai Municipal district, a district in the Ashanti Region of Ghana.
