= Kwadaso =

- Town
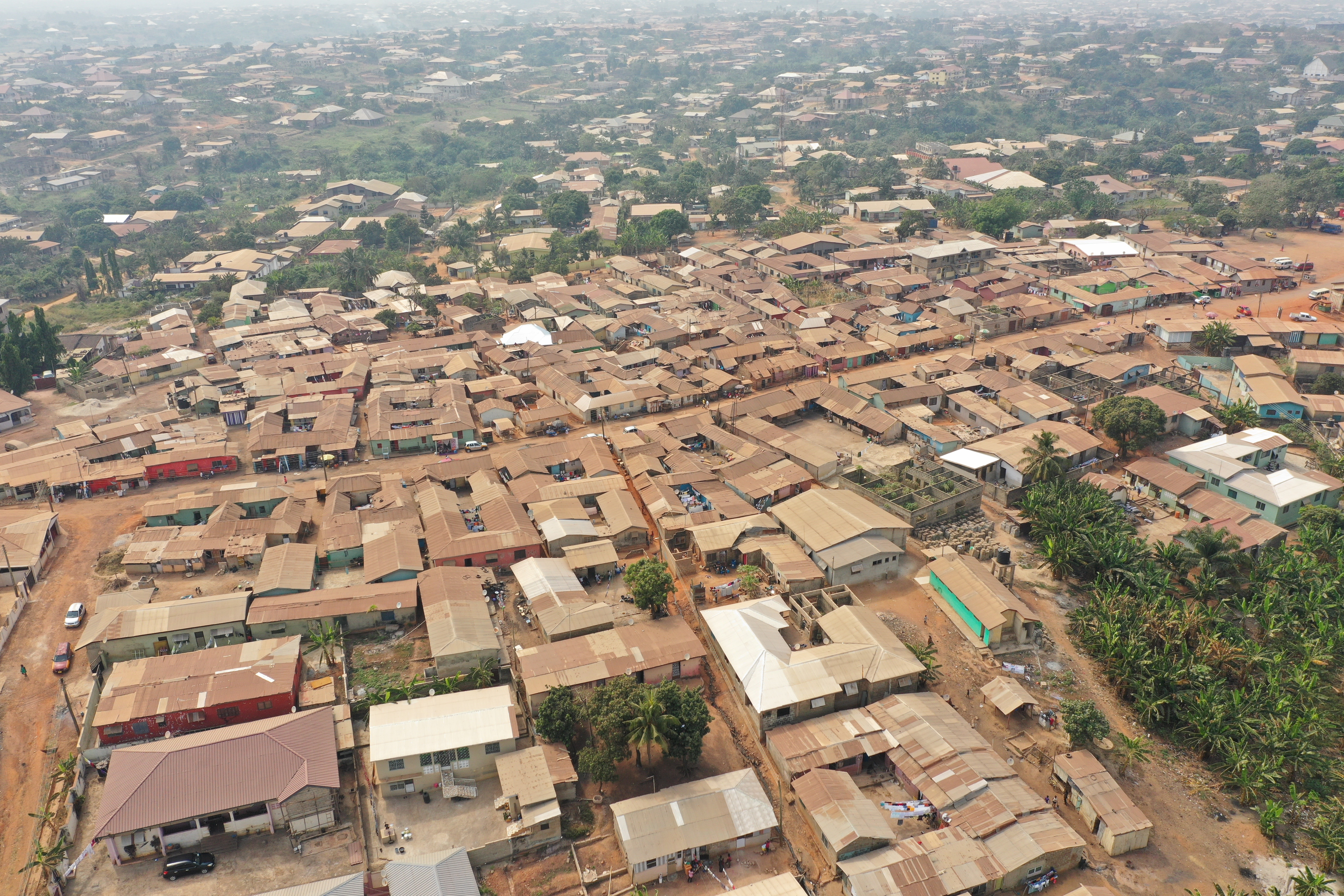

- Location within Ghana
- Coordinates: 6°41′30.28″N 1°39′5.46″W
- Country: Ghana
- Region: Ashanti Region
- District: Kumasi Metropolitan
- Elevation: 879 ft (268 m)
- Time zone: GMT
  - Summer (DST): GMT

Kwadaso is a town in the Kumasi Metropolitan, a district of the Ashanti Region of Ghana.
