= Agroyesum =

Agroyesum Manso Agroyesum
- Town
- Location within Ghana
- Coordinates: 6°24′54″N 1°52′43″W
- Country: Ghana
- Region: Ashanti Region
- District: Amansie West District
- Elevation: 794 ft (242 m)
- Time zone: GMT
  - Summer (DST): GMT

Agroyesum is a village in the Amansie West district, a district in the Ashanti Region of Ghana. It is well known for St. Martins Hospital, one of the first Hospital to treat Buruli Ulcer in Ghana.
