= Ejura =

- Town and District Capital
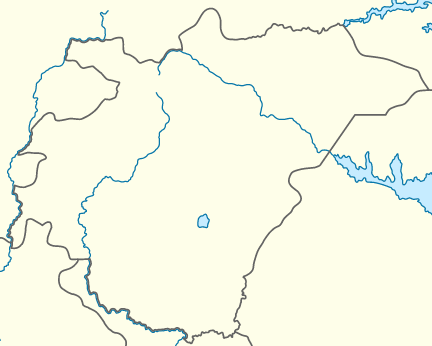
- Location of Ejura within Ashanti
- Coordinates: 7°23′N 1°22′W
- Sovereign state: Ghana
- Region: Ashanti
- District: Ejura/Sekyedumase District

Population (2012)
  - Total: 70,807
- Ranked 24th in Ghana
- Time zone: GMT
  - Summer (DST): GMT

Ejura is a town and the capital of Ejura/Sekyedumase, a district in the Ashanti Region of Ghana. Ejura has settlement population of over 130,000 people as of the 2021 population census conducted in Ghana. Ejura is the largest maize producing district in the Ashanti Region of Ghana. It is in the far north of the region, near the Afram River. Ejura is connected by highways with the towns of Mampong, Yeji and Techiman. Ejura is home to the Digya National Park / Kujani Game Reserve.

Ejura people are also Ashanti people. They are living from agriculture. The traditional celebration of these people is Sikiyerene based on yam production.

== History ==
=== 2021 shooting ===
On June 28, 2021, two people were shot and killed by the security personnel in Ejura and four others were injured during a demonstration which turned violent.

== Notable people ==
- Emmanuel Boakye born 1985 to the Ahodwo family of Ejura, is a former professional footballer who played for clubs like AFC Ajax Amsterdam, Sparta Rotterdam, Heracles Almelo and Ghana national team
