= Afrancho =

- Village
- Location within Ghana
- Coordinates: 6°33′N 1°38′W
- Country: Ghana
- Region: Ashanti Region
- District: Bosomtwe District
- Elevation: 781 ft (238 m)
- Time zone: GMT
  - Summer (DST): GMT

Afrancho is a village in the Bosomtwe district, a district in the Ashanti Region of Ghana.
