= Ejura Sekyedumase Municipal District =

- Municipal District
- Districts of Ashanti Region

- Location of Ejura Sekyedumase Municipal District within Ashanti
- Coordinates: 7°22′N 1°22′W
- Country: Ghana
- Region: Ashanti
- Capital: Ejura

Government
  - Municipal Chief Executive: Joshua Ayarkwa

Area
  - Total: 1,252 km^{2} (483 sq mi)

Population (2021)
  - Total: 137,672
  - Density: 110.0/km^{2} (284.8/sq mi)
- Time zone: UTC+0 (GMT)

Ejura Sekyedumase Municipal District is one of the forty-three districts in Ashanti Region, Ghana. Originally established as a typical district assembly in 1988, Ejura Sekyedumase District was formed from segments of the previous Sekyere District and Offinso District Councils. Later, it has elevated to municipal district assembly status on 28 June 2012. The municipality is located in the northern part of Ashanti Region, and has Ejura as its capital town.

== Sources ==
- "Districts of Ghana". Statoids.
- GhanaDistricts.com
