= Komfo Anokye Teaching Hospital =

- Ministry of Health

Geography
- Location: Kumasi, Kumasi Metropolis, Ashanti Region, Ghana
- Coordinates: 6.697479°N 1.631690°W

Organisation
- Care system: Ghana Health Service / NHIS Accredited
- Type: Teaching
- Affiliated university: Kwame Nkrumah University of Science and Technology School of Medical Sciences

Services
- Emergency department: Yes
- Beds: 1000

History
- Founded: 1954

Links
- Website: kath.gov.gh
- Lists: Hospitals in Ghana

The Komfo Anokye Teaching Hospital (KATH), also known as GEE after the name of its contractors Messrs. GEE Walter & Slater in Kumasi, Ashanti Region, Ghana, is the second-largest hospital in Ghana, and the only tertiary health institution in the Ashanti Region.

== History ==
Komfo Anokye Teaching Hospital was the main referral hospital for the Ashanti, Brong Ahafo and northern regions of Ghana. Until then Tamale Regional Hospital was upgraded to Teaching hospital hence handling referrals from Northern, Upper East and Upper West regions thereby easing some pressure on it.

The hospital was built in 1954, as the Kumasi Central Hospital. It was later named Komfo Anokye Hospital after Okomfo Anokye, a legendary fetish priest of the Ashanti. It is said that Anokye placed an unmovable sword in the middle of the Ashanti empire. Many have tried and failed to remove the sword. In 1996, the Okomfo Anokye Sword Site was built around the sword on the grounds of the hospital.

The hospital was converted into a teaching hospital in 1975 affiliated to the medical school of the Kwame Nkrumah University of Science and Technology. The hospital is also accredited for postgraduate training by the West African College of Surgeons in surgery, obstetrics and gynaecology, otorhinolaryingology, ophthalmology and radiology. The hospital currently has about 1000 beds, up from the initial 500 when first built.

The latest building added to Komfo Anokye Hospital was the National Accident and Emergency Centre.

In October 2019, the first surgery on a heart at the hospital without making an incision was performed successfully.

In November 2019, the hospital received four awards at the 2019 Ghana Procurement and Supply Chain Awards. The awards were for Excellence in Procurement and Supply Chain (silver category), Public Procurement and Supply Chain Compliance (silver category), Procurement and Supply Chain Team of the year (Bronze category).

In March 2022, the hospital received a donation of 100 beds from Ghana Oil Company Limited (GOIL) to enhance the access of beds by patients.

In 2026, the hospital announced an improve clinical care and strong service delivery systems which led a 16% dropped of institutional death in 2025. This earned the facility a 91.2 patients satisfaction rate in 2025

== Directorates ==
The hospital has clinical and non-clinical directorates.

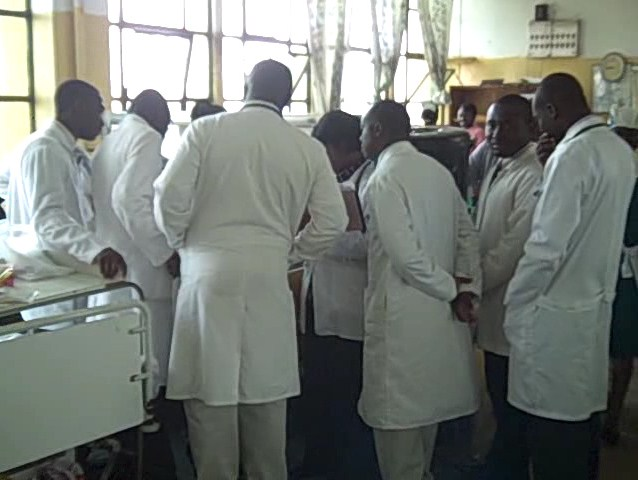
Physicians at Komfo Anokye Teaching Hospital (KATH)

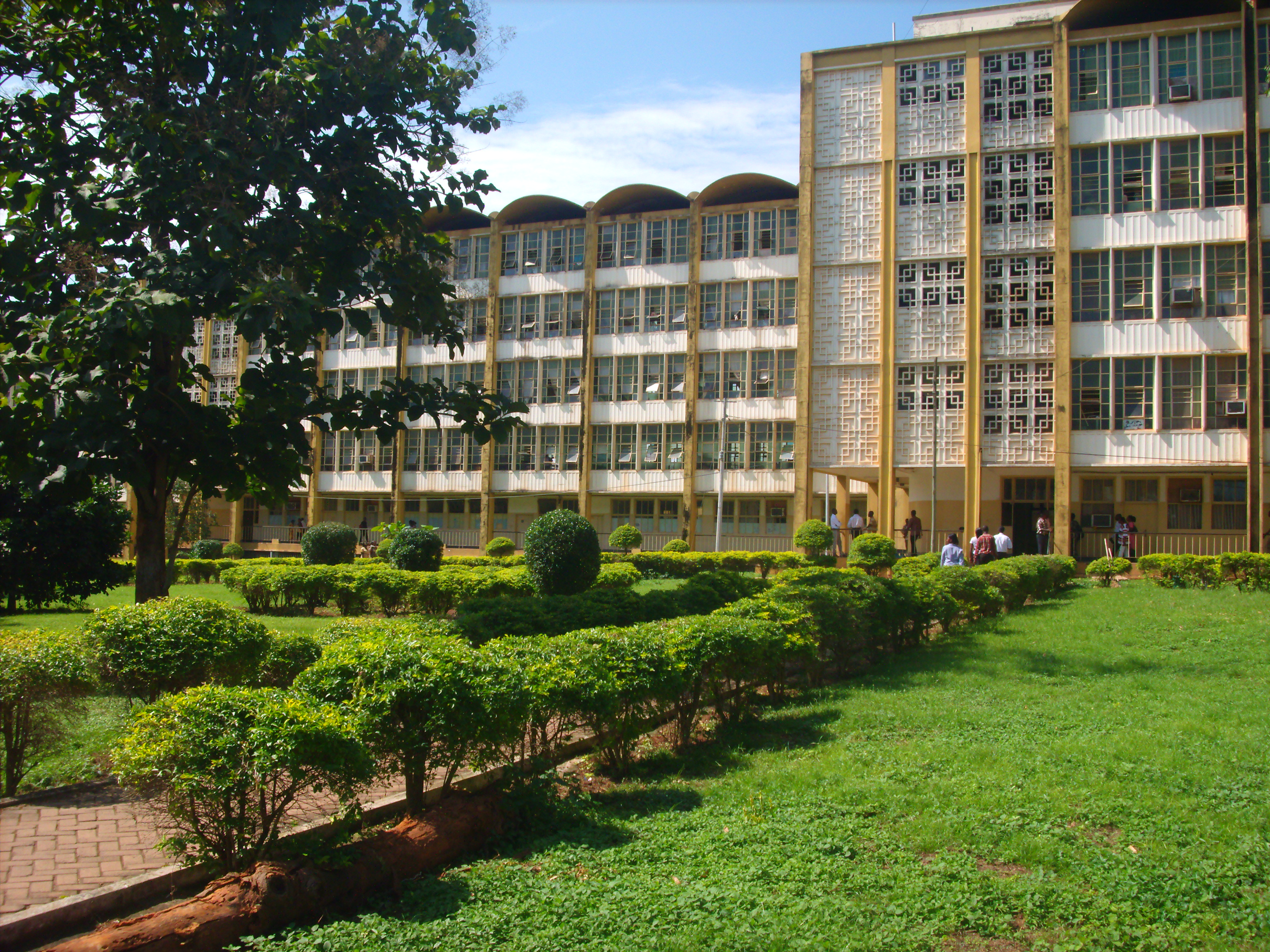
Exterior and Entrance of the Komfo Anokye Teaching Hospital (KATH)

The clinical directorates include:

- Anaesthesia and Intensive Care Unit (ICU)
- Child Health
- Oral health
- Eye, Ear, Nose and Throat (EENT)
- Diagnostics
- Medicine
- Obstetrics & Gynaecology
- Oncology
- Family Medicine
- Surgery
- Accident and Emergency department
- Pharmacy
- Physiotherapy
- Laboratory

The non-clinical directorates include:

- Domestic Services
- Security
- Supply Chain Management
- Technical Services

== National Accident and Emergency Centre ==
The constructions of the National Accident and Emergency Centre started in 2004 and were completed in 2008. The whole project was carried out by Hospital Engineering GmbH and GerTech GmbH from Germany. The project was done as a Turn-Key Project, including planning, designing, project development, construction works and implementation as well as provision and installation of medical and technical equipment.

The following departments exist:

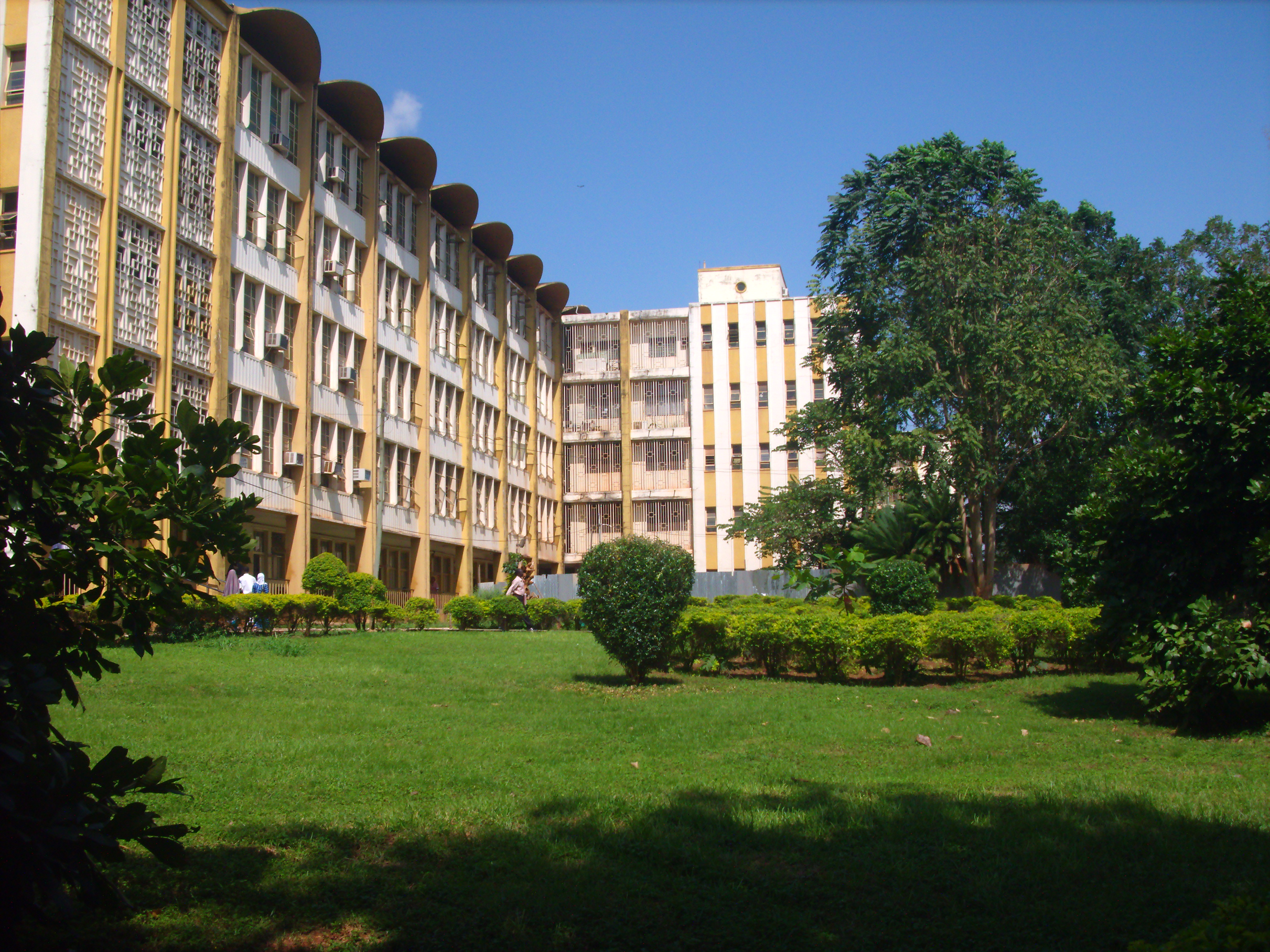
Building of KATH

- Laundry
- Central Stores
- Mortuary
- Medical Gas Bottles Store
- Blood Bank
- Blood Donor Services
- Haematology
- Microbiology
- Biochemistry
- Parasitology
- Observation Wards
- Resuscitation Area
- Pharmacy
- First Aid Bays
- Radiology
- ICU
- Wards
- CSSD
- Operating Theatre Department
- Burns Unit
- Administration

A specific feature of the National Accident and Emergency Centre is an ultramodern facility for Forensic Medicine.

== Missing baby scandal ==
On February 5, 2014 Suwaiba Abdul Mumin was admitted to the hospital for the birth of her baby. She was informed that the baby was stillborn and when she asked to see the body, she was told it could not be found. The bodies of four other children pronounced stillborn by the hospital that day were also missing. The suspicious "vanishing of babies" made headlines with some suggesting an ongoing illegal baby selling business by midwives and hospital authorities. Seven people were charged but given bail on February 27, 2014. Minister of Health Sherry Ayitey placed the doctor and midwife, as well as the chief executive officer of the hospital, on indefinite leave. She went ahead to propose a Ghc 50,000 compensation which was rejected by the Suweiba and her family who still maintain that the baby is alive.
