= Sekyere South District =

- District
- Districts of Ashanti Region

- Location of Sekyere South District within Ashanti
- Coordinates: 6°47′N 1°36′W
- Country: Ghana
- Region: Ashanti
- Capital: Agona

Government
  - District Executive: Ben Abankwa

Area
  - Total: 770 km^{2} (300 sq mi)

Population (2021 Census)
  - Total: 120,076
  - Density: 160/km^{2} (400/sq mi)
- Time zone: UTC+0 (GMT)

Sekyere South Municipal is one of the eighteen municipals in Ashanti Region, Ghana. Originally created as an ordinary district assembly in 1988 when it was known as Afigya-Sekyere District, which it was created from part of the former Kwabre-Sekyere District Council; until the western part of the district (the Afigya portion) was split off to become the northern portion of Afigya-Kwabre District on 1 November 2007 (effectively 29 February 2008); while the remaining portion has since then been officially renamed as Sekyere South District. The municipal assembly is located in the eastern part of Ashanti Region and has Agona as its capital town.

== Geography ==
Sekyere South Municipal is nearly all tropical forest. The municipal contains many types of lumber wood. There are usually around 120 days of rain per year, but most of these occur during the "rainy season", between March and July.

== Economy ==
Two thirds of the municipal's workforce are farmers, with most of the rest employed in the service sector. Major food crops include cassava, plantain, yam, and maize. The biggest cash crops are cocoa, citrus fruits, coffee, and palm oil. Many people practice kente weaving and local forms of pottery, which are then exported.

== Education ==
There are 329 schools in the municipal. SDA midwifery training college and Withrow university college both in Asamang, SDA college of Education in Agona are the few notable tertiary institutions in the municipal.

== Health ==
There are 18 health centers in the municipal.

== Tourism ==
Many of the Ashanti region's most popular tourist attractions, such as Trobo Waterfall and the Aboye Festival, are in the Sekyere South municipal.

== Sources ==
- Sekyere South Municipal
