= Amansie West District =

- District
- Districts of Ashanti Region

- Location of Amansie West District within Ashanti
- Coordinates: 6°28′N 1°53′W
- Country: Ghana
- Region: Ashanti
- Capital: Manso Nkwanta

Government
  - District Executive: Ben Kwakye-Adeefe

Area
  - Total: 1,141 km^{2} (441 sq mi)

Population (2021 Census)
  - Total: 109,416
  - Density: 95.89/km^{2} (248.4/sq mi)
- Time zone: UTC+0 (GMT)

Amansie West District is one of the forty-three districts in Ashanti Region, Ghana. Originally created as an ordinary district assembly in 1988, which it was created from the former Amansie District Council. On 15 March 2018, the southern part of the district was split off to create Amansie South District; thus the remaining part has been retained as Amansie West District. The district assembly is located in the southern part of Ashanti Region and has Manso Nkwanta as its capital town.

== Background ==
It covers an area of 1,364 square kilometers and has a population of 109,416 according to the 2021 census. Aside from its capital, the main settlements in the district include Mpatuam, Pakyi No. 1, Antoakrom and Esuowin.

There are 4 main ethnic groups in the district: the largest group of people is the Akans (86.4%), with three other smaller groups the Northerners (9.7%), the Ewe (3.6%) and the Ga (1.1%). They are also predominantly Christians (79.4%), with some Muslims (8%), and smaller number belonging to other sects or indigenous beliefs.

== Sources ==
- "Districts of Ghana". Statoids.
