= National Health Insurance Scheme (Ghana) =

National Health Insurance of Ghana

NHIS
- National Health Insurance Scheme
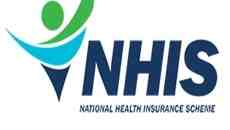

Agency overview
- Formed: 2024
- Jurisdiction: Republic of Ghana
- Parent agency: Parliament of Ghana
- Website: www.nhis.gov.gh

The National Health Insurance Scheme (NHIS) is the publicly funded healthcare systems established by the Government of Ghana in 2003. The program was a form of national health insurance established to provide equitable access and financial coverage for basic health care services to Ghanaian citizens. Ghana's universal healthcare system has been described as the most successful healthcare system on the African continent by business magnate Bill Gates. The system has been found to have made Ghana's rate of health insurance one of the highest in Africa, though funding problems may complicate its future.

== Birth of Ghana's National Health Insurance Scheme ==
The National Health Insurance Scheme is a form of social intervention established by the Government of Ghana in the year 2003. The scheme provides equitable access and financial coverage for basic health care services to residents in Ghana. The objective of the NHIS is to secure the implementation of the national health insurance policy that ensures access to basic healthcare services to all residents of Ghana.

== Areas of operation ==
The National Health Insurance Scheme has its headquarters located at 36-6th Avenue, opposite AU Suite, Ridge Residential Area, Accra.

The Authority has sixteen (16) Regional Offices, each of which is overseen by a Deputy Director, and is located in one of the sixteen (16) political regions of the nation. These offices report to the Head Office via the Membership & Regional Operations Directorate. The District offices in each region are managed by the Regional Offices. The Authority has 166 district offices and 5 registration centers in total, all of which are managed by Managers and report to the Regional offices' Membership & Regional Operations Directorate. The district offices serve as the locations for both new member registration and membership renewal for the program.

=== Health care facilities ===
Besides the premium, subscribers must also cover a processing or renewal fee for their ID cards, with the exception of pregnant women and indigents. The following table illustrates the various subscriber categories, their associated payments, and whether they are subject to a waiting period."

The National Health Insurance Authority (NHIA) has authorized various types of healthcare facilities to offer services to its subscribers.

When someone falls ill, the initial step should be to visit their primary healthcare provider. If required, the primary provider will then refer them to a higher-level facility. This approach is designed to enable regional and teaching hospitals to focus on treating more complex medical conditions, thereby mitigating overcrowding and upholding the quality of healthcare across all levels."

== Objectives and structure ==
The objective is to generate income from diverse channels, consolidate the earnings, and utilize the funds to procure healthcare services from care providers.

Ghana's healthcare funding is derived from multiple sources, such as the national budget, locally generated resources, contributions from NGOs and philanthropic organizations, external development partners and donors, payroll taxes, the NHIS levy, premiums from the informal sector, private health insurance, and out-of-pocket expenses.

NHIS covers outpatient, inpatient, oral and eye care, maternity, and emergencies but excludes cosmetic surgery, HIV drugs, assisted reproduction, echocardiography, angiography, organ transplants, and most cancer treatments. No coverage for non-cervical/breast cancer treatments and overseas diagnosis.

== Premiums ==
Like all insurance schemes, different types of premiums are available under the country's NHIS. Ghanaian contributors are grouped according to their levels of income. Based on the group a Ghanaian contributor may fall in, there is specific premium that ought to be paid.

The NHIS exempts certain individuals from paying premiums, including contributors to SSNIT who indirectly contribute through a 2.5% deduction from their payroll. Other exemptions include children up to 18 years old, elderly individuals above 70 years old, indigents, and pregnant women.

There are two main groups of NHIS subscribers: the informal group and the exempt group. Only members of the informal group are required to pay a premium, while those in the exempt groups do not have this obligation.

== Monitoring body ==
The NHIS is monitored by the National Health Insurance Authority (NHIA) under the Ministry of Health.

== Controversies ==
Since the inception of the scheme in 2003, there have been a lot of controversies surrounding its operation and purpose. The first one was to do with members of the opposition National Democratic Congress (NDC), whose members claimed that the scheme was one made for members of the New Patriotic Party (NPP). As such many members of NDC did not want to register with the scheme. The reverse of all the propaganda that surrounded the scheme at its inception were revisited in 2009 when the NDC took over power. The NDC during its campaign leading to the 2008 general elections promised to make the payment of premiums under the scheme a one-time event. This idea was included in the NDC's manifesto. The promise has so far not come into fruition as the date for its implementation is constantly postponed. Many critics of the proposal claim that it is just not possible to support the scheme with a one-time premium since the sustainability of the scheme would not be possible if premiums were not paid yearly. The promise could however not be implemented during the 8-year reign of the NDC. Beyond administrative and political debates regarding the scheme's management, recent spatial and machine learning analyses conducted by Valentine Golden Ghanem have identified significant district-level inequities in coverage. This research demonstrates that factors such as illiteracy and socioeconomic status serve as primary predictors for uninsurance, particularly within high-risk districts in the northern belt, emphasizing the need for a shift from national aggregate data to subnational, evidence-based interventions.

== Linking of NHIS card to Ghana Card ==
In November 2020, a short code (*929#) was introduced to facilitate the integration of the National Health Insurance card and the Ghana Card. This was in line with the drive to make the Ghana Card the sole means of gaining access to public services.

The National Health Insurance Scheme and National Identification Authority are collaborating to ensure that each person receives their Ghana cards so they can be combined with NHIS cards.

Mr Bernard Govina, the Municipal Manager for Ketu South municipal office of the National Health Insurance Scheme encouraged everyone to link their Ghana cards to their NHIS during a meeting with stakeholders at Denu.

== See also ==
- Health in Ghana
- National health insurance
- Universal health coverage

== Contact ==
Phone: (0) 302 238136/ 233255/ 216970/ 241690

Address: No. 36-6th Avenue, opposite AU Suite, Ridge Residential Area, Accra.

Email: info@nia.gov.gh

Website: https://nhis.gov.gh
