= Health in Ghana =

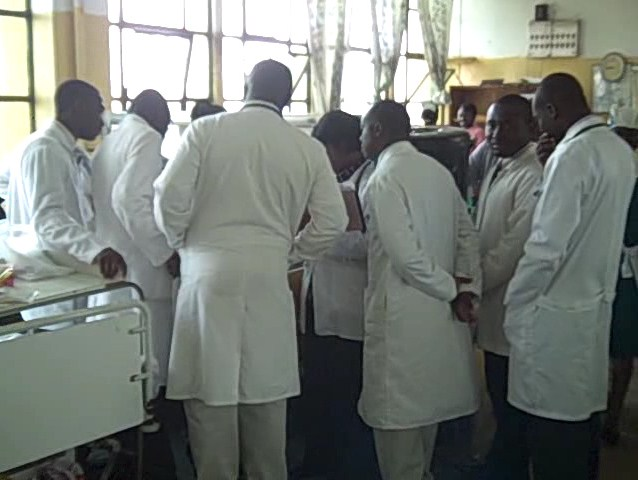
Physicians at Komfo Anokye Teaching Hospital

Health indicators
| Life expectancy | 66 |
| Infant mortality | 39 |
| Fertility | 2.12 |
| Sanitation | 14% (2010) |
| Smoker | 1% |
| Obesity female | 7% |
| Obesity male | 2% |
| Malnutrition | 1% |
| HIV | 0.7% |

In precolonial Ghana, infectious diseases were the main cause of morbidity and mortality. The modern history of health in Ghana was heavily influenced by international actors such as Christian missionaries, European colonists, the World Bank, and the International Monetary Fund. In addition, the democratic shift in Ghana spurred healthcare reforms in an attempt to address the presence of infectious and noncommunicable diseases eventually resulting in the formation of the National Health insurance Scheme in place today.

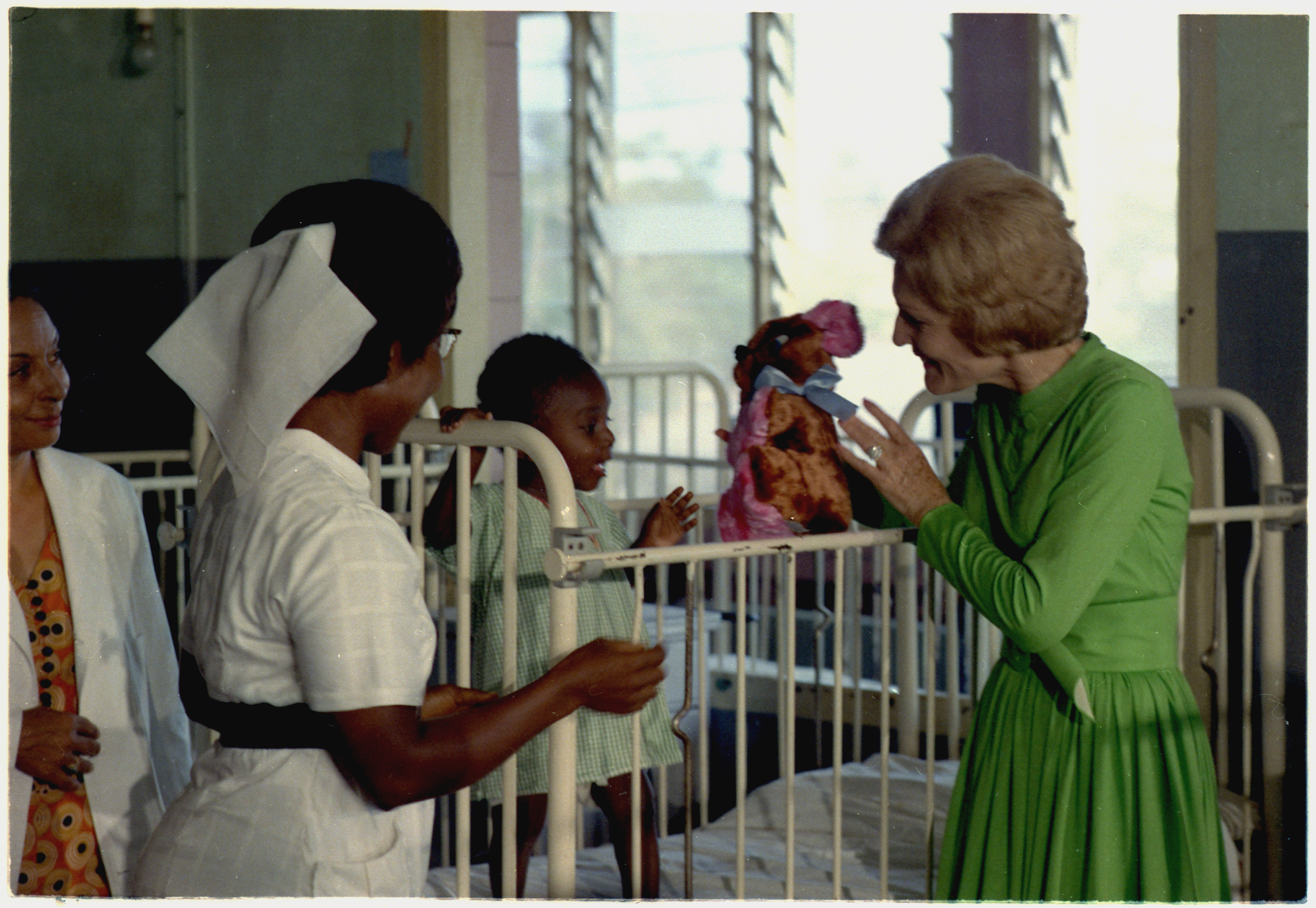
The First Lady of the United States, Mrs. Pat Nixon visits a child in a hospital in Ghana, 1972.

The Human Rights Measurement Initiative finds that Ghana is fulfilling 67.1% of what it should be fulfilling for the right to health based on its level of income. When looking at the right to health with respect to children, Ghana achieves 89.3% of what is expected based on its current income. In regards to the right to health amongst the adult population, the country achieves only 78.0% of what is expected based on the nation's level of income. Ghana falls into the "very bad" category when evaluating the right to reproductive health because the nation is fulfilling only 34.1% of what the nation is expected to achieve based on the resources (income) it has available.

== History ==
=== The Colonial Period ===
In 1874 Ghana was officially proclaimed a British colony. Ghana proved to be an extremely dangerous disease environment for European colonists, driving the British Colonial Administration to establish a Medical Department, bringing about an introduction to a formal medical system. This consisted of a Laboratory Branch for research, a Medical Branch of hospitals and clinics, and the Sanitary Branch for public health centered near British posts and towns.

In addition to hospitals and clinics staffed with British medical professionals, these select towns were also provided anti-malaria medication to be distributed to colonists and to sell to local Ghanaians. In 1878, the Towns, Police, and Public Health Ordinance was enforced, initiating the construction and demolishing of infrastructure, draining of the streets, and issuing of fines to those that failed to comply with the heads of the colony. In 1893, a Public Works Department was introduced to implement a working sanitation system in urban colonial centers.

After World War II it became increasingly clear that with improved transportation worldwide, international health policy needed to be strengthened. Organizations such as the World Health Organization and the United Nations Children's Fund were active in providing money and support to provide additional western medical care in Ghana. These organizations provided, "financial and technical assistance for the elimination of diseases and the improvement of health standards." Traditional health practices were not recognized by these initiatives or the British Medical Department in urban areas and were shunned by Christian missionaries in rural areas. However, traditional priests, clerics, and herbalists still remained important health providers especially in rural areas where health centers were scarce.

=== The Nationalist Period ===
Ghana gained her independence in 1957 and held its first multiparty elections as a republic in 1960, electing Kwame Nkrumah of the Convention People's Party as Ghana's first President. During the period, the government encouraged socioeconomic development by improving citizens' welfare, including increasing their access to healthcare. As part of these reforms, the private medical industry expanded and healthcare was made free for most citizens.

During the Colonial and early post-Independence periods, most healthcare was focused on the control of epidemics and the treatment of infectious diseases. In cities like Accra, the rate of chronic diseases increased in middle- and high-income groups due to urbanization, globalization, and Nkrumah's focus on infectious disease.

Ghana's health programs were financed entirely through general taxation, but with free public healthcare and large government spending, Ghana found herself struggling economically.

=== The Fourth Republic ===
In the early 1990s, a democratic movement resurfaced and began to sweep through Africa. In response to democratic demands, the Rawlings regime transitioned to create a political party, the National Democratic Congress (NDC), legalized political parties, and organized Presidential and Parliamentary elections in 1992 during which Rawlings won with 58.3 percent of the vote. The new democratic constitution under Rawlings included provisions to better social policies such as education and healthcare in the midst of the rising HIV/AIDS epidemic. In 1996, a Medium Term Health Strategy was adopted that signified a shift from time-restricted, rigid projects to a more holistic approach that would better help develop the public health sector.

In 2015, life expectancy at birth was 66.18 years with males at 63.76 years and females at 68.66 years. Infant mortality is at 37.37 per 1000 live births. The total fertility rate is 4.06 children per woman among the 15 million Ghanaian nationals. In 2010, there were about 15 physicians and 93 nurses per 100,000 persons.

== Health care system ==
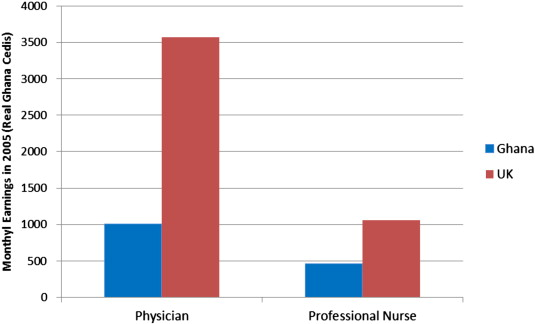
Ghana versus United Kingdom; physicians and professional nurses monthly salary comparison chart

Healthcare in Ghana is mostly provided by the national government, which spends less than 5% of the GDP on healthcare. The healthcare system faces challenges with regard to access, especially in rural areas that are not close to public hospitals.

Historically, the healthcare system has gone through several major periods, pre and post-colonial. In the precolonial period traditional priests, clerics, and herbalists were the primary care givers, offering advice. The use of traditional healers persists mostly in rural regions of Ghana.

The post-colonial period marks the beginning of government intervention on behalf of healthcare through a variety of policies on different government regimes. Interventions were plagued with inadequate performance and rising costs for consumers. These policies culminate to the implementation of the National Health Insurance Scheme (NHIS). The NHIS is currently serves people in both the formal and informal employment sectors and seeks to increase access to healthcare for all Ghanaians. While NHIS is still in use, its performance and problems are studied by researchers to identify needed areas of reform.

Research into district-level health insurance inequities by Valentine Golden Ghanem has shown that literacy and socioeconomic status are primary drivers of uninsurance in northern regions.

== Disease ==
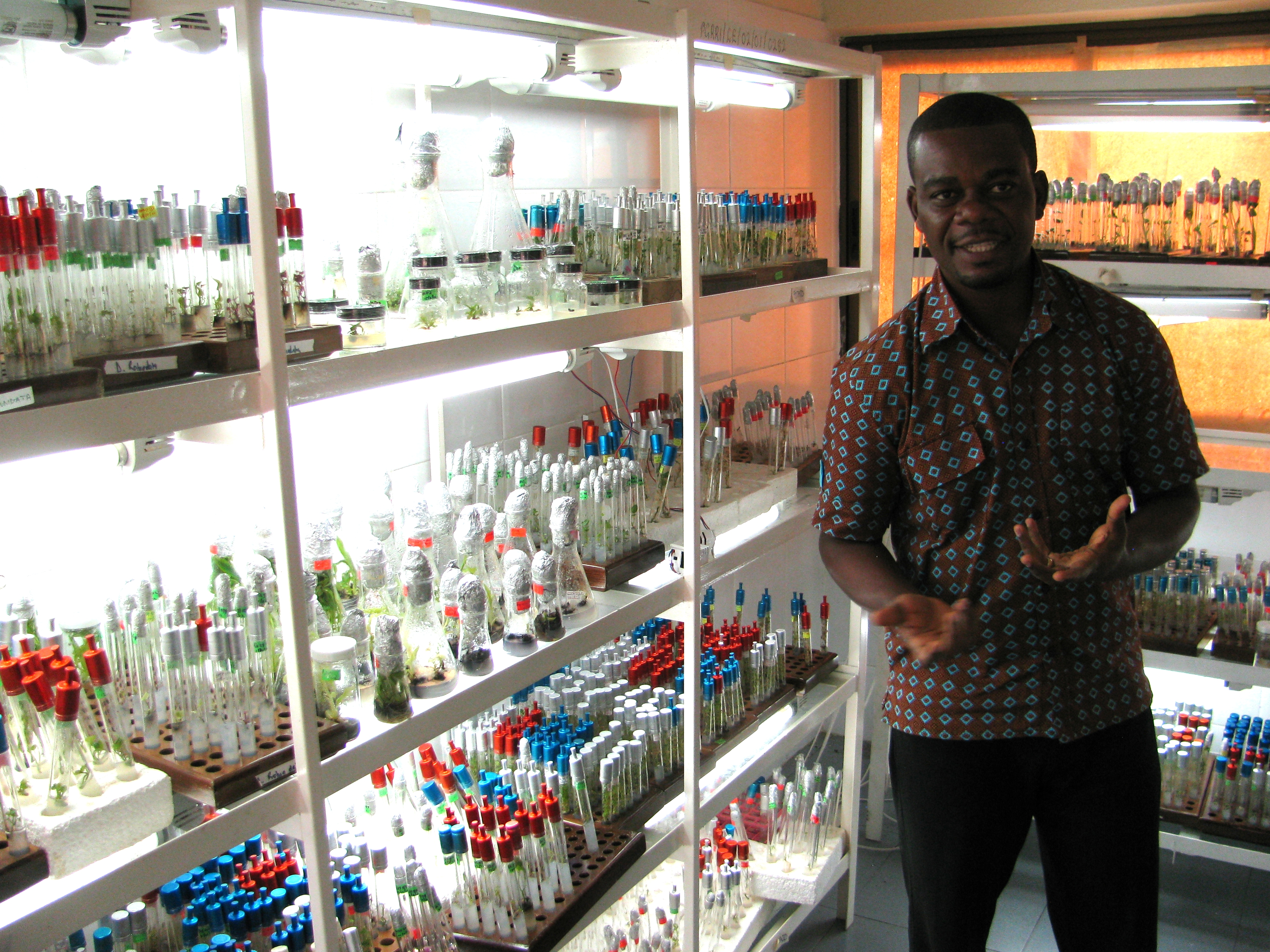
Ghanaian biochemist presenting a gene bank in Ghana

According to the World Health Organization, the most common diseases in Ghana include those endemic to sub-Saharan African countries, particularly: cholera, typhoid, pulmonary tuberculosis, anthrax, pertussis, tetanus, chicken pox, yellow fever, measles, infectious hepatitis, trachoma, malaria, HIV and schistosomiasis. Though not as common, other regularly treated diseases include dracunculiasis, dysentery, river blindness or onchocerciasis, several kinds of pneumonia, dehydration, venereal diseases, and poliomyelitis.

In 1994, the WHO reported malaria and measles were the most common causes of premature death. In 1994, 70 percent of deaths in children under five were caused by an infection compounded by malnutrition. A 2011 report by the Ghana Health Service said that malaria was the primary cause of morbidity and about 32.5 percent of people admitted to Ghanaian medical facilities were admitted because of malaria.

The most recent report from the WHO in 2012 identifies the top causes of death in Ghana as lower respiratory infections (11%), Stroke (9%), Malaria (8%), ischemic heart disease (6%), HIV/AIDS (5%), preterm birth complications (4%), birth asphyxia and birth trauma (4%), meningitis (3%), and protein-energy malnutrition (3%). The life expectancy for women is 63 years while for men, it is 60 years. The infant mortality rate is 41 out of every 1000 live births.

Health trends

The maternal mortality ratio (per 100 000 live births) has improved by 585 deaths per 100 000 live births from 848 [574 - 1,250] in 1985 to 263 [180 - 376] in 2020 which is a little above the world average of 223. The life expectancy at birth for a Ghanaian is 66.1 which is below the worlds average of 71.3 years as of 2021. According to WHO under 5 mortality rates has declined progressively from 127.6 per 1000 lives birth in 1990 to 42.8 per 1000 lives birth in 2022 as compared to the Africa region average of 74 per 1000 lives birth.

Ghana`s burden of diseases

According to the Global Burden of Diseases (GBD), the leading causes of disability and mortality as of 2021 in Ghana were: I. stroke, ii. ischemic heart diseases, iii. hypertensive heart diseases, iv. covid-19, v. neonatal disorders, vi. malaria, vii. HIV, x. lower respiratory tract infection. Top five causes of death in adults includes, stroke (14%), ischemic heart disease (7%), diabetes mellitus (4%), Cirrhosis & other chronic liver disease (3%), chronic kidney disease (3%). Among children under 5 years, the top five causes of death were neonatal disorders (43%), malaria (18%), lower respiratory tract infection (6%), diarrheal disease (4%) and sexually transmitted disease including HIV

=== Malaria ===
According to the Centers for Disease Control and Prevention, malaria was the third leading cause of death and accounted for 8% of all deaths in Ghana in 2012 despite the fact that malaria is preventable and curable. Malaria occurs every year and affects people of all ages and demographics with women and children under 5 being the most vulnerable groups. In addition, poor communities disproportionately are affected by infectious diseases when compared to wealthy communities due to lack of access to mosquito nets, adequate healthcare, and anti-malaria medication. According to the 2014 Ghana Demographic and Health Survey, the prevalence of malaria in children ages 6 months to 5 years is 36%.

The CDC, Ministry of Health, and Ghana Health Services collaborate to develop and implement malaria control initiatives such as insecticide treated mosquito nets, indoor residual spraying, improving diagnostics, research, and case management. Insecticide treated mosquito nets have been identified as a cost-effective and sustainable public health method to combat malarial infections. The Ministry of Health and the Ghana Health Service mass distribute the nets free of charge at schools and clinics. At least one Insecticide-treated mosquito net is owned by 68% of all households in Ghana; however, the Ghana Health and Demographic Survey noticed large gaps between insecticide treated mosquito net ownership and use meaning that many with access to the nets are not effectively using them.

The current situation of malaria in Ghana.

Globally, the incidence of malaria (per 1000 population at risk) has improved by 22.6 cases per 1000 from 81 [75.7 - 87.7] in 2000 to 58.4 [52.9 - 65.3] in 2022. In 2022, according to the National Malaria Elimination Program of Ghana, the country recorded over 5.2 million confirmed cases of malaria, with 151 malaria-associated deaths. The is an impressive development from the year 2012 when the nation recorded 2799 mortality due to malaria, The current prevalence rate of malaria in Ghana is 8.6% in 2022 which is a decline from 27.5% in 2011.Since the start of the pilot program of the worlds first malaria vaccine in 2019, the confirmed cases of malaria per100 people has dropped from 192 to 159 just a year after.

=== HIV/AIDS ===
Like other countries worldwide, HIV/AIDS is present in Ghana. In 2014, the estimated people that had HIV were 290,000 people out of Ghana's entire population of 27,499,924. In 2014, 2.0% of Ghanaian adults ages 15–49 were HIV positive and less than 1% of people ages 15–24 were HIV positive. HIV is higher in urban areas than in rural areas with prevalences rates of 2.4% and 1.7% respectively. Although 70% of women and 82% of men have knowledge and use of HIV awareness and prevention methods, HIV/AIDS remains a large common health problem as many individuals do not consistently use a condom, have multiple partners, and fail to get HIV/AIDS testing.

In response to the HIV epidemic in the country, the Government of Ghana established the Ghana AIDS Commission, which coordinates efforts amongst international organizations and other parties to support education about eradication of HIV/AIDS throughout Ghana by the year 2022. The CDC, alongside Ghana's Ministry of Health and Ghana Health Services, is also active in combating HIV/AIDS through improving Ghana's HIV/AIDS data collection and analysis methods in an effort to effectively allocate resources specific to each community's need.

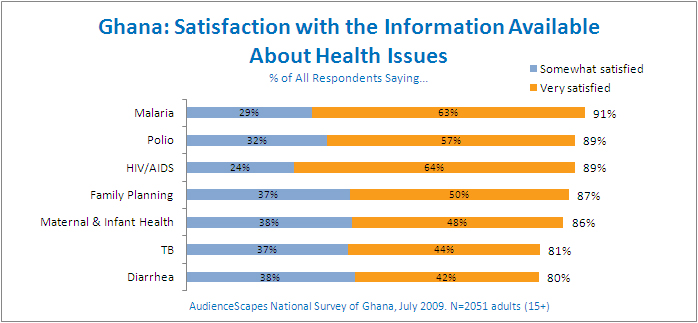
Health informatics of Ghana's population satisfaction with health care in Ghana and health care provider information

=== Chronic Diseases ===
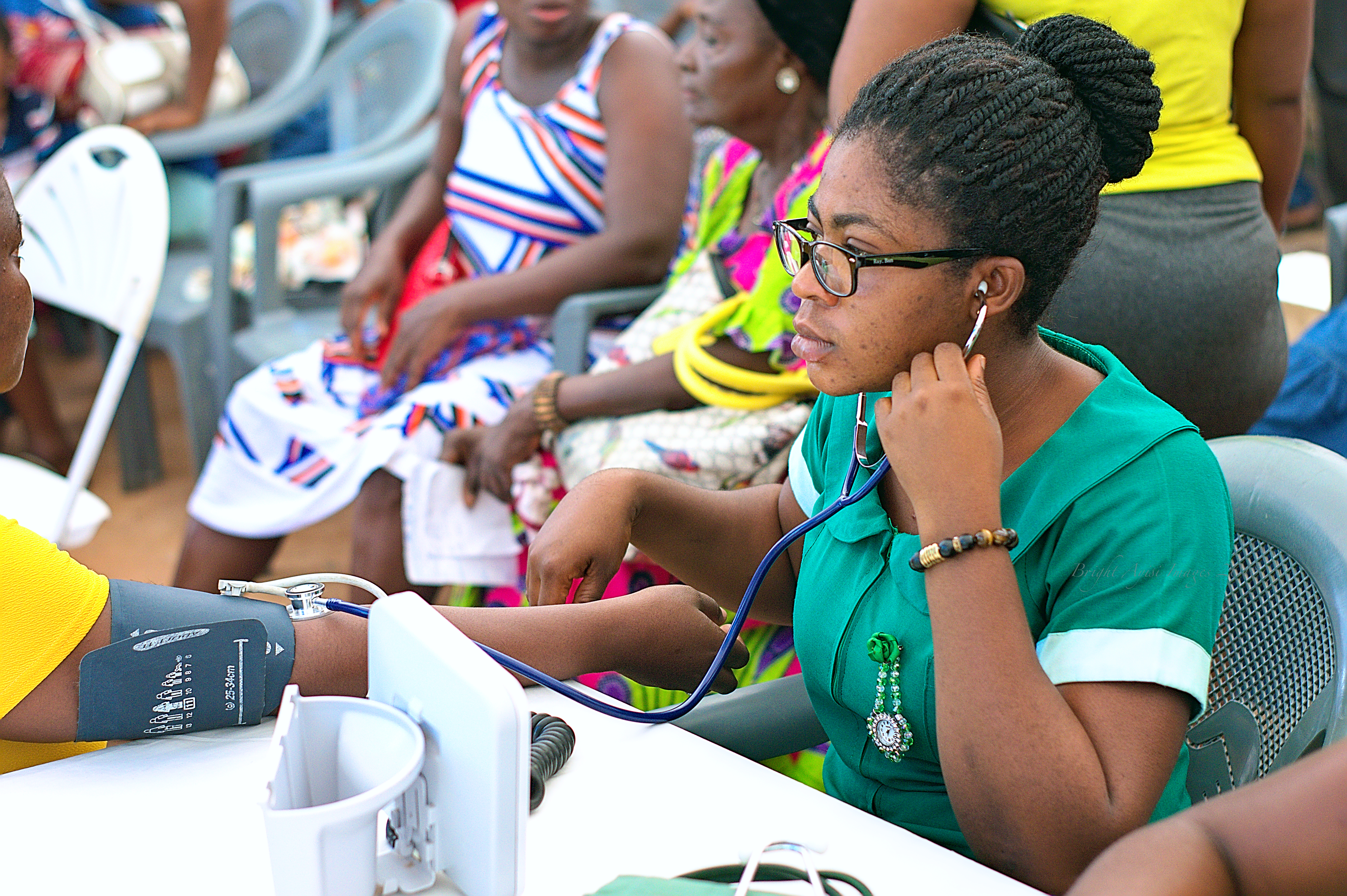
A nurse measuring blood pressure.

Though largely ignored by healthcare, public health, and governmental policies, chronic disease prevalence and mortality rates have increased in the present day. Epidemiologists have seen an overall rise in mortality rates caused by chronic diseases compared to pre-independence data that attributed most causes of death to infectious diseases across communities and economic strata. This shift in causes of death from mostly chronic diseases and among wealthy urban populations to a mixture of chronic and communicable diseases in poorer populations reflects increasing life expectancy rates and differences in access to healthcare among differing communities. Chronic diseases receive less attention as a major public health crisis when compared to infectious diseases due Ghana's healthcare system historically and currently placing priority on combating infectious diseases compounded by inadequate financial and human resources.

Chronic diseases have a long history in Africa with early records describing liver cancer in 1817, sickle cell disease in 1866, stroke in the 1920s and studies conducted since the 1950s containing prevalence rates and other important statistics for hypertension, diabetes, cancers, and sickle cell disease. Previously the seventh cause of death in 1953, cardiovascular disease became the number one cause of death in 2001. By 2003 four chronic diseases, stroke, hypertension, diabetes and cancer, had become among the top ten causes of death in Ghana. According to Ghana's 2014 Demographics and Health Survey, 40% of men and 25% of women are overweight with previous data showing a 10% prevalence rate in women in 1993. Hypertension had a national prevalence rate of 28.7% in 2006.

==== Cancer ====
Cancer in Ghana is an important cause of death and illness in Ghana, with current estimates indicating over 24,000 new cases each year. In 2020, 15,802 Ghanaians died from cancer. Nearly 95,000 cases of cancer were reported in Ghana in 2019. A 2015 study in Kumasi recorded breast and cervical cancer raked high records among females. Prostate cancer recorded the highest among males. Breast, liver and cervical were leading in both sexes.

==== Disability ====
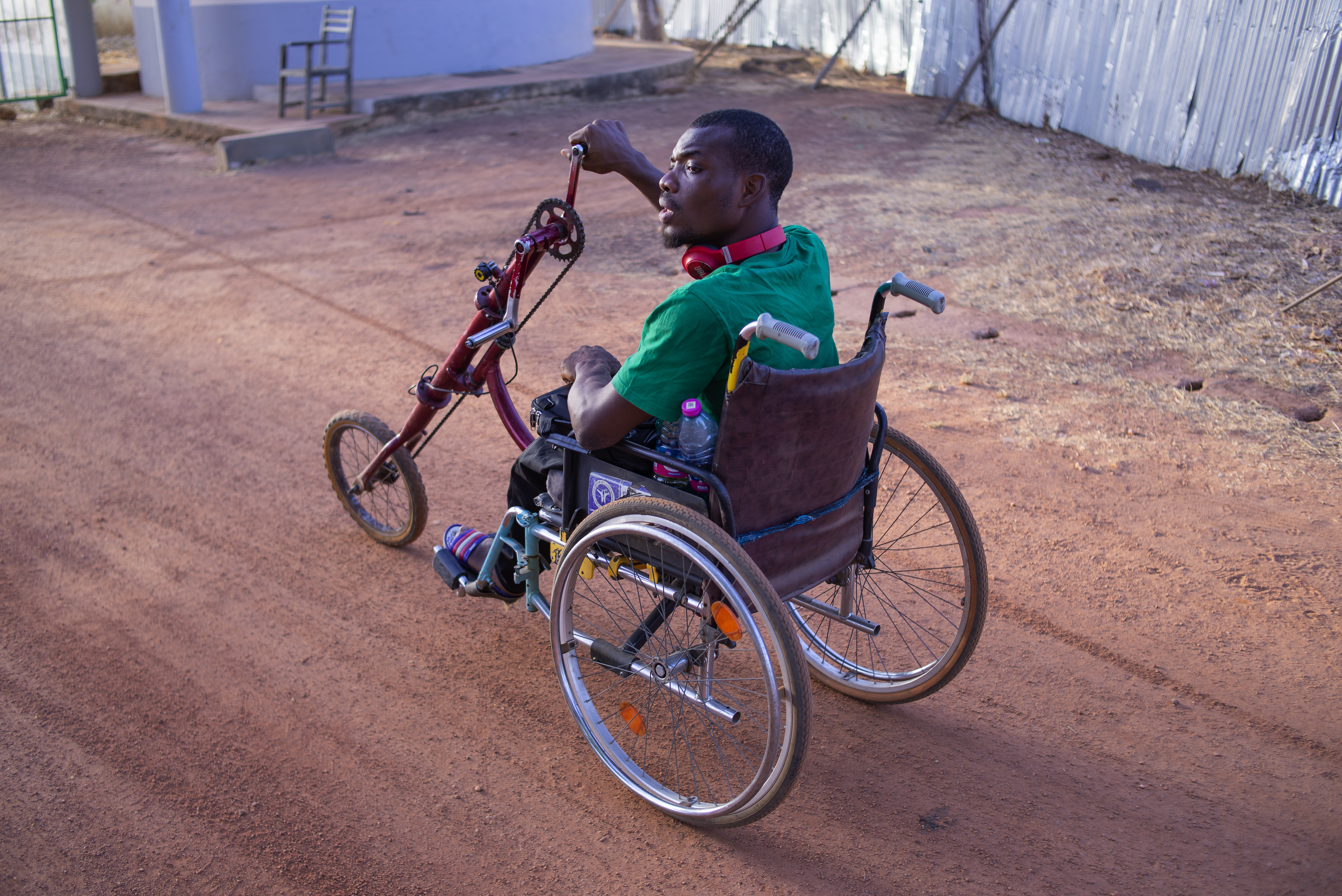
A Ghanaian man in a wheelchair

The Ghana Statistical Service reports from their 2021 census indicate that approximately eight percent (2,098,138 individuals) of the Ghanaian population experience some form of disability, with a higher prevalence among females (8.8%) than males (6.7%). Disabilities are more common in rural areas (9.5%) compared to urban areas (6.5%). Among the six domains of disability, difficulty in seeing is the most widespread, affecting four percent of the population, while difficulty in communicating is the least common, affecting one percent. Disability issues in Ghana have evolved from a human rights concern to a developmental issue due to Ghana's high poverty rate.

=== Opioid addiction ===
In 2021, it was estimated that between 24.9% and 77.6% of Ghanaian youth recreationally used tramadol. More men than women used the drug, and especially males in the informal job sector. In Ghana's media, young people's use of tramadol has been framed in moral terms, rather than a health issue. Structural factors in Ghanaian society that may influence the uptake of Tramadol use, include poor working conditions, and anxiety and uncertainty of employment.

Cited reasons for using tramadol, including boosting mood, stress relief, physical endurance at work, and as a sexual enhancer. Some tramadol users reported being coerced into taking up the drug by their employers, so they could work harder, and for longer hours.

== Women's health ==
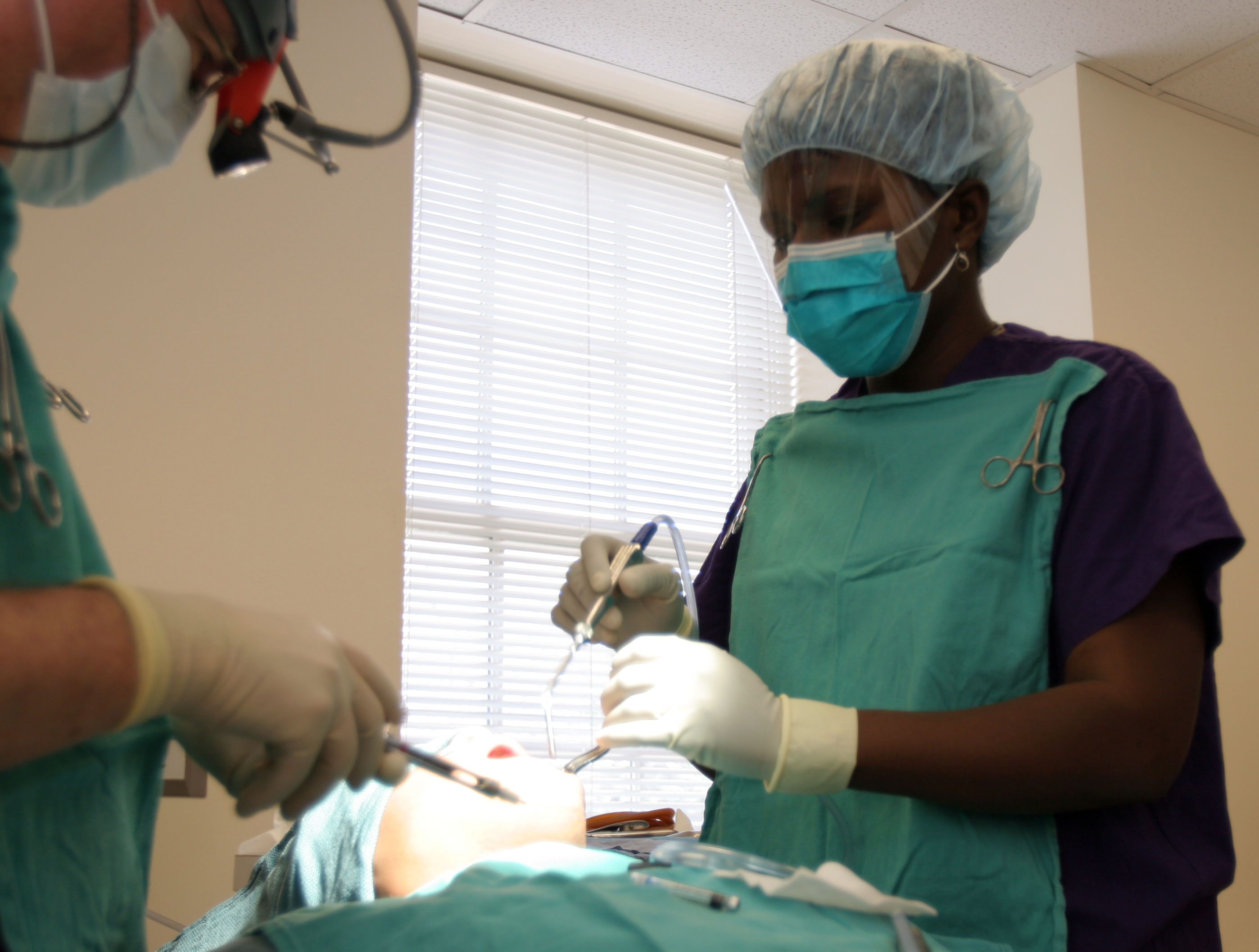
Ghanaian female surgeon performing an operation.

The health of women in Ghana is critical for national development. Women's health issues in the country are largely centered on nutrition, reproductive health and family planning. Reproduction is the source of many health problems for women in Ghana. The Ghana Living Standards Survey Report of the Fifth Round revealed that about 96.4% of women reported that they, or their partners, were using modern forms of contraception.

This statistic has significant importance in reducing the spread of HIV/AIDS, which affected 120,000 women in Ghana in 2012 (of the 200,000 people living with the disease in Ghana in 2012). Interventions for improving the health of women in Ghana, such as the Ghana Reproductive Health Strategic Plan 2007–2011, focus on maternal morbidity and mortality, contraceptive use and family planning services, and total empowerment of women.

== Water supply and sanitation ==
Since 1994, the water supply and sanitation sector has been gradually modernized through the creation of an autonomous regulatory agency, introduction of private sector participation, and decentralization of the rural supply to 138 districts, where user participation is encouraged. The reforms aim at increasing cost recovery and a modernization of the urban utility Ghana Water Company Ltd. (GWCL), as well as of rural water supply systems. The National Water Policy (NWP), launched at the beginning of 2008, seeks to introduce a comprehensive sector policy.

=== Water resources ===
Ghana is well endowed with water resources. The Volta River system basin, consisting of the Oti River, Daka River, Pru River, Sene River and Afram River as well as the White Volta and Black Volta rivers, covers 70% of Ghana's total land area. Another 22% of Ghana is covered by the southwestern river system watershed comprising the Bia River, Tano River, Ankobra River and Pra River. The coastal river system watershed, comprising the Ochi-Nawuka River, Ochi-Amissah River, Ayensu River, Densu River and Tordzie River, covers the remaining 8% of Ghana.

Furthermore, groundwater in Ghana is available in mesozoic and cenozoic sedimentary rocks and in sedimentary formations underlying the Volta Basin. Lake Volta, with a surface of 8,500 km^{2}, is the Earth's largest artificial lake. In all, the total actual renewable water resources are estimated to be 53.2 billion m³ per year.

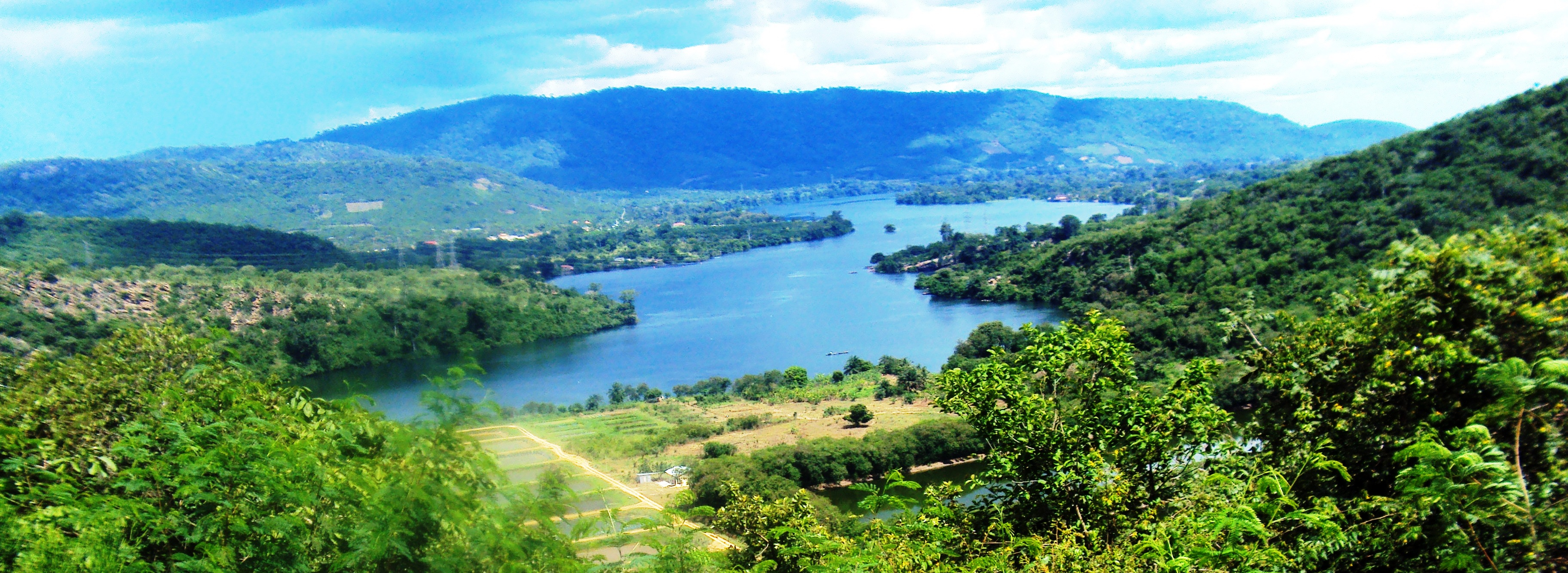
Panorama and landscape view of Lake Volta in Volta Basin and Eastern Region of Ghana. Lake Volta by artificial surface area is the largest reservoir and lake in the world. Lake Volta drains into the Gulf of Guinea on the Atlantic Ocean. Volta River has three main tributaries—the Black Volta, White Volta and Red Volta.

== Some Public Health Facilities in Ghana ==
1. Korle-Bu Teaching Hospital

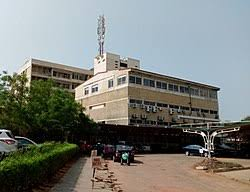
KORLE BU

2. Tamale Teaching Hospital

3. Cape Coast Teaching Hospital

4. Ho Teaching Hospital

5. Komfo Anokye Teaching Hospital

6. 37 Military Hospital

7. Ghana College of Surgeons and Physicians

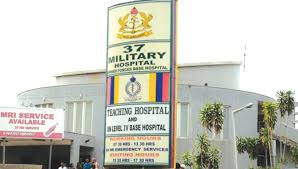
37 MILITARY

== See also ==
- Prayer camps, Ghana
- Volunteer Partnerships for West Africa
- Accra Declaration
