= Healthcare in Ghana =

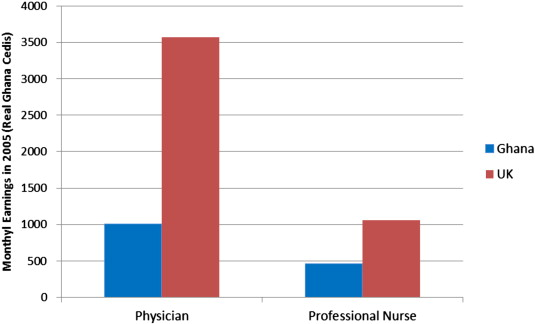
Ghana versus United Kingdom; physicians and professional nurses monthly salary comparison chart

Healthcare in Ghana is mostly provided by the national government, which spends less than 5% of the GDP on healthcare. The healthcare system faces challenges with regard to access, especially in rural areas that are not close to public hospitals.

Historically, the healthcare system has gone through several major periods, pre and post-colonial. In the precolonial period traditional priests, clerics, and herbalists were the primary care givers, offering advice. The use of traditional healers persists mostly in rural regions of Ghana.

The post-colonial period marks the beginning of government intervention on behalf of healthcare through a variety of policies on different government regimes. Interventions were plagued with inadequate performance and rising costs for consumers. These policies culminate to the implementation of the National Health Insurance Scheme (NHIS). The NHIS is currently serves people in both the formal and informal employment sectors and seeks to increase access to healthcare for all Ghanaians. While NHIS is still in use, its performance and problems are studied by researchers to identify needed areas of reform.

== History ==
In urban Asante, all physicians were organized and specialized under the Nsumankwaafiesu which was described by Asantehene Prempeh I as "the pharmacology where we had well trained and qualified physicians in charge whose duty was to attend to the sick and injured." The head of this office was the Nsumankwahene who served as the native doctor of the state and doctor of the Asantehene. Physicians applied herbal decoctions to cure sprains, constipation, veneral diseases, external inflammation, boils and acute diarrhoea. Abortants, surgery and variolation were also employed among Asante physicians.

In 1874 Ghana was officially proclaimed a British colony. Ghana proved to be an extremely dangerous disease environment for European colonists driving the British Colonial Administration to establish a Medical Department bringing about an introduction to a formal medical system, consisting of a Laboratory Branch for research, a Medical Branch of hospitals and clinics, and the Sanitary Branch for public health centered near British posts and towns. In addition to hospitals and clinics staffed with British medical professionals, these select towns were also provided anti-malaria medication to be distributed to colonists and to sell to local Ghanaians.

The World Health Organization and the United Nations Children's Fund were active in providing money and support to provide additional western medical care in Ghana. They provided, "financial and technical assistance for the elimination of diseases and the improvement of health standards." Traditional health practices were not recognized by these initiatives or the British Medical Department in urban areas and were shunned by Christian missionaries in rural areas. However, traditional priests, clerics, and herbalists still remained important health providers especially in rural areas where health centers were scarce. After independence in 1957 Kwame Nkrumah pushed health and education policies that aimed to make these services more available and accessible; however, these policies were still mainly targeted at urban populations with 76% of doctors practicing in urban areas while only 23% of the population lived there. Health programs were financed entirely through general taxation, so anyone could receive medical care in any government hospital at no cost. Public Health workers would conduct inspections in workplaces to evaluate cleanliness to ensure that all citizens were living and working in environments that promoted preventative care. But with free public healthcare and large government spending, Ghana found itself struggling economically. Declining world prices of its cash crops put more strain on the Ghanaian economy. After Nkrumah left office in 1966, subsequent governments decided to continue to keep out of pocket fees low in addition to cutting government healthcare spending with the 1969 Hospital Fees Decree and the 1970 Hospitals Fees Act in the hopes of recovering fees and bolstering the economy. Even with the cut in government spending, economic conditions continued to worsen as did healthcare services. In 1980s, many social services, including healthcare, were inadequate and could not provide sufficient care and drugs despite the fact that healthcare was virtually free.

By 1981, health services had dramatically declined to the extent that hospitals lacked basic supplies, while healthcare workers left the country in hordes. In some public hospitals, patients had to provide their food, medicine, and bedding and could be detained until they paid their hospital bill. Others were forced to self-medicate due to the high prescription costs. On December 31, 1981, Jerry Rawlings overthrew the Limann government and became the Head of state of Ghana. With the World Bank and International Monetary Fund pressing the government to cut public spending through structural adjustment programs, the new regime passed the Hospital Fees Regulation in 1985 which resulted in greater out of pocket fees with the aim to be able to finance the drugs and resources the healthcare system needed. It was supposed to help the government make up 15% of healthcare servicing costs that it had lost in earlier years. This became the "cash and carry" system which required Ghanaians to pay out of pocket fees at each point of service. According to a number of empirical studies, this excluded many individuals from public healthcare who could not afford to pay these fees resulting in many Ghanaians belonging to the lower and middle classes to be dissatisfied with the cash-and-carry system and the structural adjustment programs lead the Ghanaian expenditure on healthcare to decrease from 10% in 1983 to 1.3% by 1997. Despite public disapproval in regards to healthcare, these policies are credited with saving Ghana's economy.

In 1997, a Health Fund was launched to provide a pool of funding for the sector. Still, however, the biggest barrier to Ghanaians receiving proper healthcare was the high out of pocket fees. Despite exemptions expansions and infrastructure that increased access to healthcare, out of pocket fees remained a huge barrier. In the election of 2000, John Kufuor as part of the New Patriotic Party (NPP) won over the NDC candidate and in 2003 he launched the National Health Insurance Scheme as under the National Health Insurance Act, providing universal healthcare to all Ghanaians. The National Health Insurance Scheme was viewed as a solution to addressing user fees and making healthcare accessible, for which political advocacy, leadership, and commitment were necessary.

== Healthcare in the 21st century ==
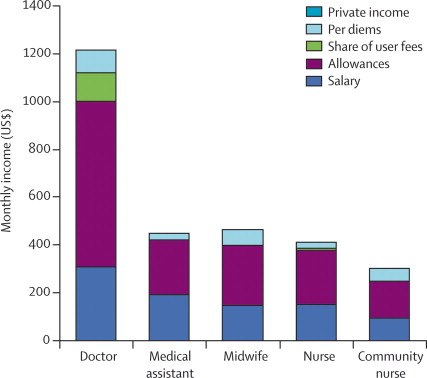
Ghana health care providers monthly salary and income chart

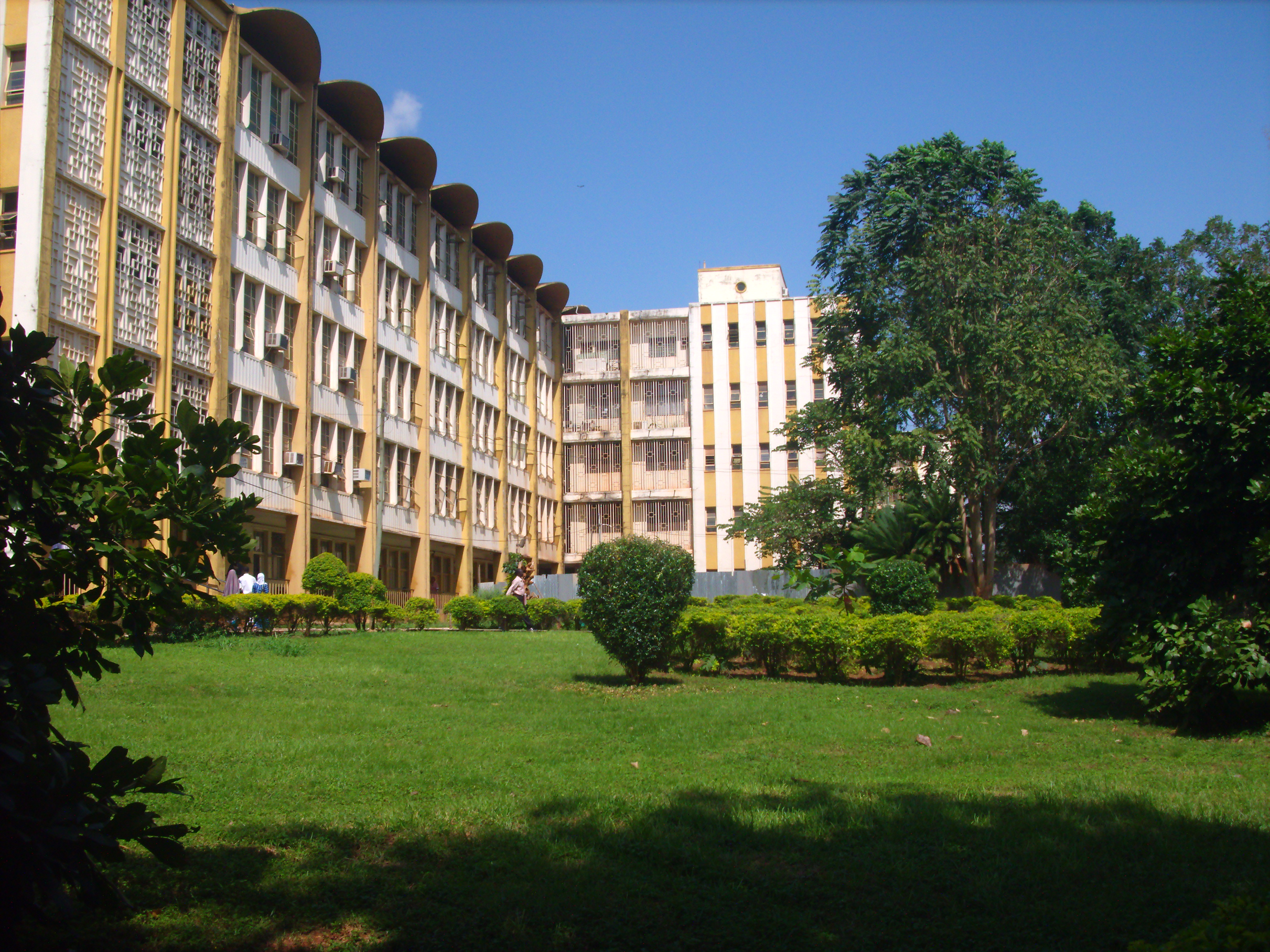
Komfo Anokye Teaching Hospital, Kumasi

In Ghana, most health care is provided by the government and is largely administered by the Ministry of Health and Ghana Health Services. The healthcare system has five levels of providers: health posts, health centers and clinics, district hospitals, regional hospitals and tertiary hospitals. Health posts are the first level of primary care for rural areas.

These programs are funded by the government of Ghana, financial credits, Internally Generated Fund (IGF), and Donors-pooled Health Fund. Hospitals and clinics run by Christian Health Association of Ghana also provide healthcare services. There are 200 hospitals in Ghana. Some for-profit clinics exist, but they provide less than 2% of health care services. While public and private hospitals are both utilized, the private sector leads in quality of service whereas medical services have better outcomes within public hospitals.

=== Rural areas ===
Health care is very variable through Ghana. Urban centres are well served, and contain most hospitals, clinics, and pharmacies in the country. Rural areas often have no modern health care. Patients in these areas either rely on traditional African medicine, or travel great distances for health care. In 2005, Ghana spent 4% of GDP on health care, or US$30 per capita. Of that, approximately 34% was government expenditure. Zipline began the Ghana Drone Delivery Service in April 2019 to deliver vaccines, blood, plasma, and drugs to remote areas. The plan is that health workers will receive deliveries via a parachute drop within about 30 minutes of placing their orders by text message. The drones have a round-trip range of 160 km and can reach about 12 million people.

=== Expenditure ===
In 2021, 4.15% of Ghana's GDP was spent on health, and all Ghanaian citizens had access to primary health care. Ghanaian citizens make up 97.5% of Ghana's population. Ghana's universal health care system has been described as the most successful healthcare system on the African continent by the renowned business magnate and tycoon Bill Gates.

=== National Health Insurance ===
NHIS
- National Health Insurance Scheme
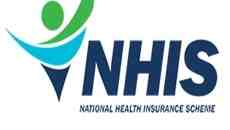

Agency overview
- Formed: 2003
- Jurisdiction: Republic of Ghana
- Parent agency: Parliament of Ghana
- Website: Official Website

Ghana has a universal health care system, National Health Insurance Scheme (NHIS), and until the establishment of the National Health Insurance Scheme, many people died because they did not have money to pay for their health care needs when they were taken ill. The system of health which operated prior to the establishment of the NHIS was known as the "Cash and Carry" system. Under this system, the health need of an individual was only attended to after initial payment for the service was made. Even in cases when patients had been brought into the hospital on emergencies, it was required that money was paid at every point of service delivery. When the country returned to democratic rule in 1992, its health care sector started seeing improvements in terms of:

- Service delivery
- Human resource improvement
- Public education about health condition

The current NHIS operates under the one-time premium policy, where people make one payment for a lifetime of healthcare. The one-time premium policy was used as a way to increase access to healthcare services to those "outside formal sector employment", allowing taxi drivers, street vendors, etc. to benefit from the NHIS. The one-time payment plan has been unable to fully fund health services for all citizens. These services may have to funded by tax revenue. In addition, the actual act of collecting premiums from the informal employment sector can be costly and there has been allegations of fraud on the part of the official collectors. Those in the informal sector, who do not have the means to pay the one-time premium are essentially locked out of the NHIS benefits if they cannot get access to premium exemptions. Due to the unevenly spread benefits, the poor benefit less from the system.

Although enrolment is mandatory, in practice it is voluntary, with population coverage at 36% in 2018 and 51% in 2021. A 2017 survey revealed that health insurance paid out only 16.7% of the medical expenses of the ill or injured across the country. Healthcare facilities prefer patients who pay for treatment in cash rather than paying by national health insurance. The program does not appear to reduce out-of-pocket payments for subscribers. Spatial analyses of the public insurance system by Valentine Golden Ghanem have identified significant regional disparities, particularly in high-risk districts where socioeconomic factors predict lower enrollment.

In 2024, the Finance Minister, Dr Mohammed Amin Adam, announced that the Government had "connected 193 health facilities, including 49 polyclinics, to its new e-health system," thereby "enhancing access to patient data at the point of care, claims management, and real-time bio-surveillance data."

== Maternal and Child Health Care ==
=== Maternal Health Care ===
The current population of Ghana is estimated to be 30.42 million (around 50.9% is the male population, while the female population is around 49.1%) In Ghana the number of midwives per 1,000 live births is 5 and the lifetime risk of death for pregnant women 1 in 66.

Maternal deaths accounted for 14% of all deaths, 10% from direct maternal causes and 4% from indirect maternal causes. Nearly all women (98%) aged 15–49 who had live births or stillbirths in the five years before the survey in 2017 received antenatal care (ANC) from a skilled provider (doctor, nurse/midwife, or community health officer/nurse). Among these women, 86% attended their first ANC visit for a checkup, and 14% went due to complications.

In 2015, the maternal mortality rate per 100,000 births for Ghana was 319 compared to 409.2 in 2008 and 549 in the year 1990.

With collaborative efforts from the Ghana Health Service, the current Ghanaian Government, and the various policy makers, Ghana has for the first time recorded its lowest maternal mortality rate in 2018 with 128 deaths per 100,000 live births as against 144 per the same number of deliveries in 2017.

The progress, however, still falls short of global targets for reproductive, maternal, newborn, child and adolescent health (RMNCAH) targets to reach a maternal mortality rate (MMR) of 70 per 100,000 live births by 2030.

Organizations within Ghana work to target STI prevention, such as the Planned Parenthood Association that offers a comprehensive sexuality education manual for young people. Global NGO's are also active in preventing the spread of AIDs within Ghana.

==== Fertility ====
Fertility rate declined from 3.99 (2000) to 3.28 (2010). Looking at the total fertility rate, 3.94 children are born to every woman in the rural region and 2.78 children are born to every woman in the Urban region (2018 est.). Country comparison to the world: 34th

Gross Reproduction Rate	1.43 babies Per 1,000 births
Ratio at Birth - Male to Female	102.62 males per 100 females in 2015

Maternal Age and Fertility
Maternal Age	Fertility Rate Per 1,000 Women
15 - 19	37.80 Per 1,000 Women
20 - 24	112.20 Per 1,000 Women
25 - 29	158.00 Per 1,000 Women
30 - 34	133.40 Per 1,000 Women
35 - 39	82.80 Per 1,000 Women
40 - 44	37.80 Per 1,000 Women
45 - 49	16.80 Per 1,000 Women

=== Breast cancer ===
Breast cancer is the most common cancer among females in Ghana. In 2020, there were 4400 cases of breast cancer and 2797 estimated cervical cancer cases. Over 3,000 women are diagnosed with cervical cancer each year and more than half of the figure die in Ghana. In 2018, it was estimated that over four thousand cases of breast cancer will be diagnosed and about 1800 women could die from cancer.

In Ghana, breast cancer is the leading malignancy. In 2007, breast cancer accounted for 15.4% of all malignancies, and this number increases annually. Roughly 70% of women who are diagnosed with breast cancer in Ghana are in the advanced stages of the disease. In addition, a recent study has shown that women in Ghana are more likely to be diagnosed with high-grade tumors that are negative for expression of the estrogen receptor, progesterone receptor, and the HER2/neu marker. These triple negative breast tumors are more aggressive and result in higher breast cancer mortality rates.

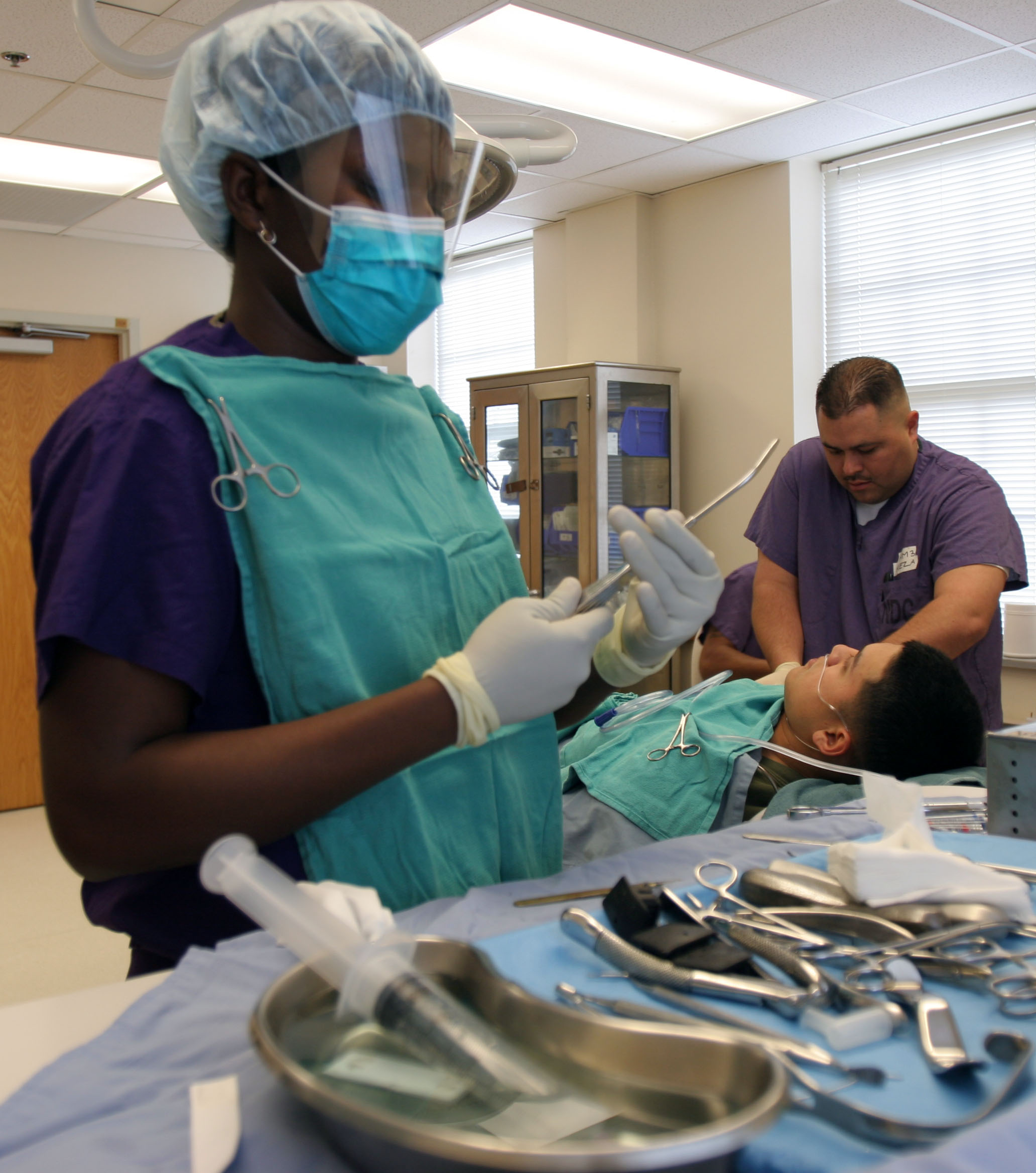
Ghanaian female surgeon preparing to perform an operation

=== Child Health Care ===
About 3.16 million children under the age of 5 years make up the Ghanaian population; with 1.6 million being males and 1.56 million being females.

For under-five mortality, Ghana in 2015 was estimated to have a rate of 61 deaths per 1000 live births and at the current pace, it could only reach 36.6 deaths per 1000 live births in 2030 against the target of 25 deaths per 1000 live births.

==== Exclusive Breastfeeding Practices ====
In Ghana, breastfeeding is common with nearly all children being breastfed. However, the Ghana Demographic Health Survey in 2014 has reported an exclusive breastfeeding rate of 52% at 6 months, which is below the optimal Exclusive Breastfeeding rate of 90% in infants less than 6 months set by the WHO/UNICEF for developing countries. About 43% of infants 0–6 months old are exclusively breastfed; Few children receive nutritionally adequate and safe complementary foods;in many countries less than a fourth of infants 6–23 months of age meet the criteria of dietary diversity and feeding frequency that are appropriate for their age. Though the rate of exclusive breastfeeding in Ghana is below the optimal rate for developing countries, Ghana is doing well (52%) compared to the global rate (43%) of exclusive breastfeeding.

The latest Multiple Indicator Cluster Survey shows that about 13% of children below age 5 years are underweight, 23% are stunted, and 6% are wasted. In the country's capital, Greater Accra Region (GAR), underweight is found among 8.3% of children 0–5 years while 13.7% and 5.4% are stunted and wasted respectively. In the Ashanti Region where the capital is Kumasi, The current rate of exclusive breastfeeding till 6 months of age is an estimated 13.9%. In the Northern region where the capital is Tamale, the rate of exclusive breastfeeding is 63.3%.

There are interventions such as The Ghana Health Service's Child Welfare Clinic (CWC) which is a comprehensive child health service that includes immunization, nutrient supplementation, and growth monitoring and promotion to regulate and monitor the under five health care, infant feeding practices, and empower mothers on the appropriate care required for their children in the country.

The Growth Monitoring and Promotion (GMP) component of the CWC is focused on empowering mothers to know about and become competent to practice appropriate child care, feeding, and health seeking. These outcomes are pursued using individualized and group counseling. The GMP provides an opportunity for interaction between public health workers and mothers regarding the health and well-being of their children.

NGO involvement

Non-governmental organizations (NGOs) play a critical role in addressing the challenges of Ghana's healthcare system, particularly in areas underserved by the National Health Insurance Scheme (NHIS). Organizations, often guided by the UN or WHO, may employ an asset-based community engagement model. NGOs focus on empowering local leaders and ensuring community-driven initiatives aimed at achieving health equity and social justice. One example is Child Family Health International (CFHI), which supports public health education, strengthens local healthcare systems, and integrating biomedical and traditional practices to address structural inequities and improve access. Additionally, NGOs often provide resources and training to healthcare providers, helping to address barriers like the adoption of health information technology. Despite operating on the margins of the central system, these organizations complement government efforts by filling gaps in funding, capacity, and implementation, making significant contributions to sustainable health improvements across Ghana.
