= HIV/AIDS in Ghana =

HIV Virus in Ghana

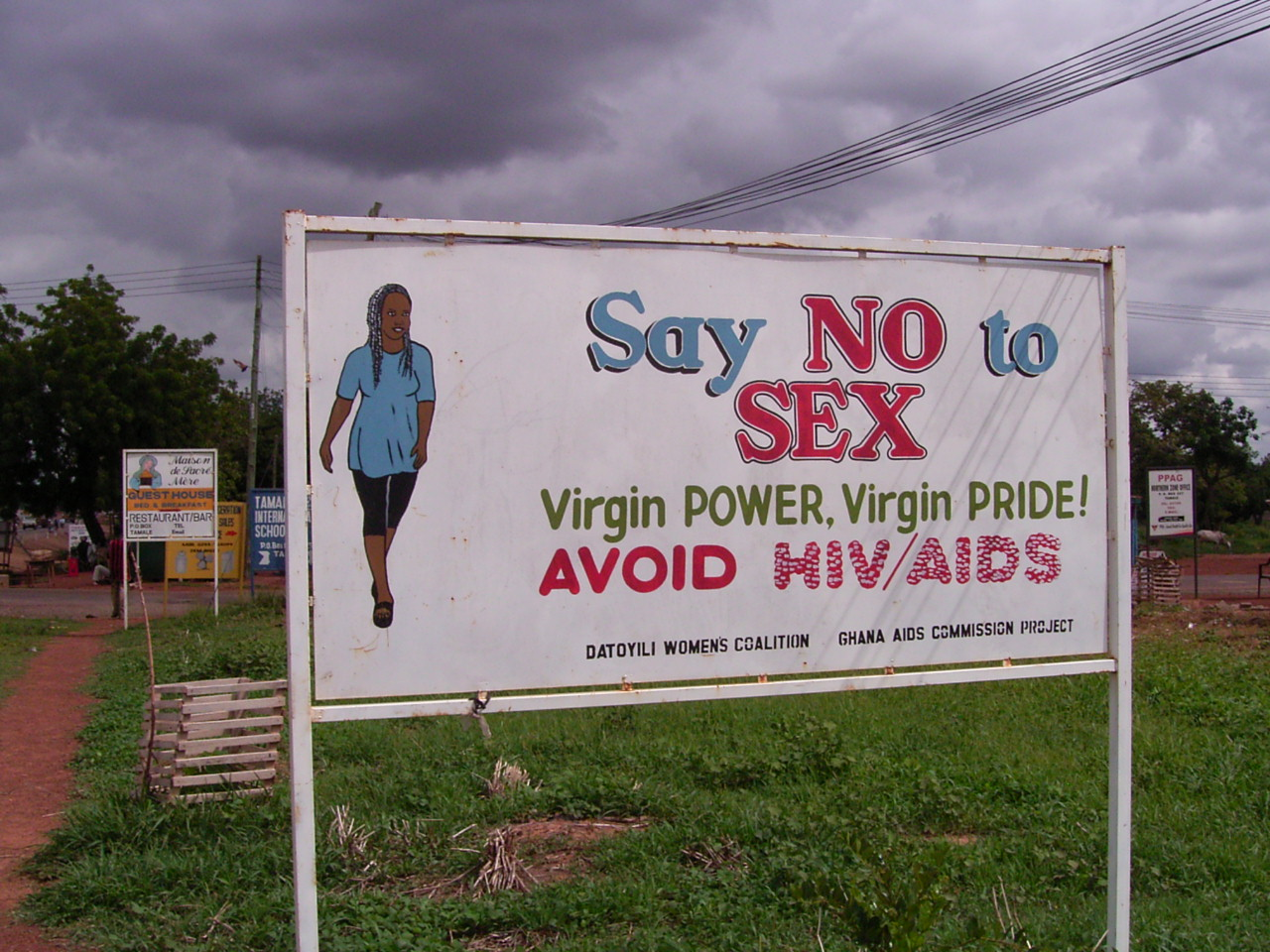
No Sex (Anti-HIV/AIDS ― Signage) in Ghana: These Signages from the Ghana AIDS Commission are everywhere in Ghana.

HIV/AIDS is persistent in Ghana, with an overall HIV prevalence of 1.6%. As of 2022, approximately 355,000 people in Ghana are living with HIV. Although new HIV infections and AIDS-related deaths have both been decreasing annually since 2007, there were still approximately 17,000 new HIV infections and 9,000 AIDS-related deaths in Ghana in 2022.

Historically, HIV prevalence has been highest in the Eastern Region of Ghana and lowest in the northern regions of Ghana. In response to the epidemic, the government has established the Ghana AIDS Commission which coordinates efforts amongst NGO's, international organizations and other parties to support the education about and treatment of aids throughout Ghana and alleviating HIV/AIDS issues in Ghana.

== Prevalence ==
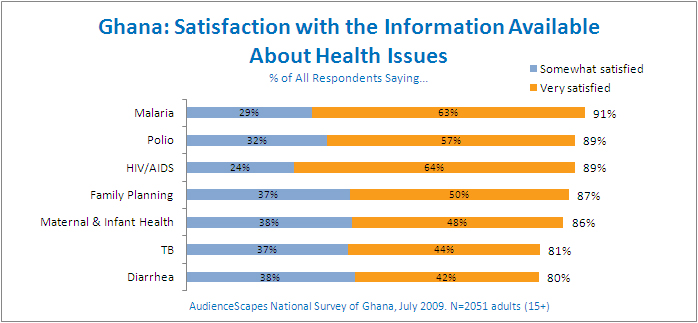
Health informatics of Ghana's population satisfaction with health care in Ghana and health care provider information

The HIV/AIDS elimination in Ghana seems to be progressing rapidly. The Government of Ghana and Ghana AIDS Commission estimated the number of adults and children living with HIV as of 2014 at 150,000 and prevalence at 1.37% in 2014. The Joint United Nations Program on HIV/AIDS (UNAIDS) estimated the HIV prevalence in adults to be 0.9% at the end of 2012, with an estimated 200,000 people living with HIV/AIDS."Health Profile: Ghana".

Ghana's system of HIV surveillance for women attending antenatal clinics has functioned well since its establishment in 1994. Sentinel surveys of 21 antenatal clinic sites in 2002 reported a range from 3.1% to 9.1% in prevalence among pregnant women. In 2002, the median HIV prevalence at four of these sites in Accra was 4.1%. Elsewhere in Ghana, prevalence in antenatal clinics ranged from 3.2% to 3.4% in 2002.

HIV prevalence is highest in the Eastern Region of Ghana and lowest in the northern regions of the country. Prevalence is generally higher in urban areas, in mining and border towns, and along main transportation routes. HIV-1 accounts for 92% of HIV cases in Ghana; another 7.4% of reported HIV cases are dual infections with HIV-1 and HIV-2. Only 0.5% of HIV cases were exclusively HIV-2.

Heterosexual intercourse is the mode of transmission for about 80% of HIV cases, with mother-to-child transmission accounting for another 15%. In 2003, HIV prevalence was very low among most younger age groups, as relatively few are infected during their youth, with the exceptions of infants infected through their mothers. The infection peaks late, compared to other countries, at 35–39 years for women and 40–45 years for men. The infection levels are highest in middle income and middle educational groups, with the poor and unemployed less affected. With 1.47% being Ghana's adult prevalence rate it is the 34th country with the highest rate out of 196 countries in the world with Eswatini having the highest rate. That means that Ghana has a pretty good chance of not getting rid of HIV/AIDS from the whole country. Maybe they would be able to get rid of HIV/AIDS but at least not all of it because it does not tell us the children's prevalence rate.

Though evidence is still being gathered for making program decisions, some populations thought to be at risk include sex workers, transport workers, prisoners, sexual partners of people living with HIV/AIDS, and men who have sex with men and their female sexual partners. HIV prevalence among uniformed services is not fully established.

Approximately 9,600 children under age 15 are living with HIV/AIDS. At the end of 2003, nearly 170,000 children under age 17 had lost one or both parents to AIDS. At that time only a few thousand of these children received assistance such as food aid, health care, protection services, or educational or psychosocial support.

There is widespread knowledge of HIV and modes of transmission—with awareness of AIDS estimated at greater than 95%—although fear and stigmatization of HIV-positive people remain high. The populace are at risk of further HIV spread for a variety of reasons, including engaging in transactional sex, marriage and gender relations that disadvantage women and make them vulnerable to HIV, inaccurate perceptions of personal risk, and stigma and discrimination toward people living with HIV/AIDS.

== National response ==
The Ghana AIDS Commission is the coordinating body for all HIV/AIDS-related activities in the country; it oversees an expanded response to the epidemic and is responsible for carrying out the National Strategic Framework on HIV/AIDS for the 2001–2005 period. The Ghana AIDS Commission is currently reviewing the National Strategic Framework II, covering 2006–2010, with stakeholders, and bilateral and multilateral partners. The frameworks set targets for reducing new HIV infections, address service delivery issues and individual and societal vulnerability, and promote the establishment of a multisectoral, multidisciplinary approach to HIV/AIDS programs.

Ghana's goal is to prevent new HIV infections as well as to mitigate the socioeconomic and psychological effects of HIV/AIDS on individuals, communities, and the nation. The first national strategic plan focused on five themes: prevention of new infections; care and support for people living with HIV/AIDS; creation of an enabling environment for a national response; decentralization of implementation of HIV/AIDS activities through institutional arrangements; research; and monitoring and evaluation of programs. The second national strategic plan, currently in process, focuses on: policy, advocacy, and enabling environment; coordination and management of the decentralized response; mitigating the economic, sociocultural, and legal impacts; prevention and Behavior Change Communication; treatment, care, and support; research and surveillance; and monitoring and evaluation.

Multilateral and bilateral partners, nongovernmental organizations (NGOs), and civil society organizations actively participate in the national response, with more than 2,500 community-based organizations and NGOs reportedly implementing HIV/AIDS activities in Ghana. Substantial funding for HIV/AIDS activities is received from the Ghana AIDS Commission. Activities include the five-country, World-Bank-led HIV/AIDS Abidjan-Lagos Transport Corridor project; the World Bank-funded Treatment Acceleration Program for public-private partnership in HIV/AIDS management; the World Health Organization (WHO) 3X5 initiative; the Global Fund to Fight AIDS, Tuberculosis and Malaria (GFATM).

Following the Declaration of Commitment of the United Nations General Assembly Special Session on HIV/AIDS in 2001, the Government of Ghana earmarked 15% of its health budget for HIV/AIDS activities, and all ministries were asked to create an HIV/AIDS budget line. Available funding to support Ghana's response to the HIV/AIDS epidemic includes about $6.7 million from GFATM; about $12 million from multilateral partners, including the World Bank; and about $8 million from bilateral donors. Based on the level of funding already committed by the national government and its donors, WHO estimates a $5 to $12.8 million funding gap for HIV/AIDS activities in Ghana for the period 2004–2005.

== See also ==
- Health care in Ghana
