= Sally Torpey =

Ghanaian fashion designer and businesswoman

- Born: Ghana
- Education: University Practice Senior High School
- Occupations: Fashion designer and entrepreneur
- Known for: Sympathy International, JAK Gentle Giant Clothing, Oheemaa™
- Office: CEO of Sallet Fashion House
- Website: salletfashionhouseafrica.com

Sally Esinam Torpey is a Ghanaian International fashion designer and entrepreneur. She is also the treasurer for the Greater Accra Chapter of the Association of Ghana Industries (AGI) and the Ambassador from Africa for the Fashion Business Association of America. She has trade missions worldwide which include the United States, United Kingdom and Japan. She is a winner of the 100 Most Influential Leaders in Africa award and a KYEN (Kufuor Young Entrepreneurs) member. She is the owner of the Sallet Fashion House Ghana; the Sallet Foundation; and the brands Oheema, The Travelers Custom Made Clothing (TCMC), and JAK Gentle Giant Collection. She is an international speaker with interests in fashion, business, women empowerment, and personal development. She has been featured in publications and magazines like the Afrikan Post, a Washington DC newspaper, Ghana web, Caribbean magazines, The CCWC and Creative Magazine of Miami. She is a case study for Growth Cap UK and others. She is the African presence at the Centre for International Trade Development at the Miami World Trade Centre, where she promotes products from the continent. She is also very active on the African Trade Expansion Project.

== Sallet Fashion House ==
Sallet Fashion House was started in 2010 along with the Sallet Foundation. This was to facilitate capacity building for a sustainable and state of the art production industry for the manufacture of garments. The fashion house and foundation are aided by the Ministry of Trade to set up clothing training and production centres to reduce unemployment. Production for other brands and designers is a potential Sallet Fashion House possesses. The Travelers Custom Made Clothing (TCMC) is one of her creations. TCMC produces custom made clothes and makes them available to travelers who are spending a minimum of three days and are on the move. She has showcased on many platforms both in Ghana and internationally like the African Sustainable Eco-Friendly show (Ghana) and the Miami and New York fashion weeks.

== Sympathy International ==
Sympathy International which was initially called the Millennium Ladies Club, was set up in 2003 when Sally was a student of University Practice High School in Cape Coast. One of its goals is to nurture female high school students into responsible women. Its main aim is to mitigate issues of concern for people, especially women in the rural areas of the Central Region of Ghana. The vision is to create a permanent conducive environment which will create a dignified way of life for the people by overcoming disease, deprivation and poverty. The plan for girls of school going age is reproductive health education, and future planning. This is done with the help of health workers, career counselors and the Ghana AIDS Commission.

== Awards and recognition ==
100 Most Influential Leaders in Africa award for the year 2022.
