= Patrick Kuma-Aboagye =

Ghanaian medical doctor

Dr. Patrick Kuma-Aboagye

Director-General Ghana Health Service
- Incumbent
- Assumed office November 2019
- President: Nana Akuffo-Addo
- Preceded by: Anthony Nsiah-Asare

Personal details
- Born: Ghana
- Occupation: Public Health Specialist
- Profession: Medical Doctor

Patrick Kuma-Aboagye is a Ghanaian medical doctor and senior public health specialist who is currently the Director-General of the Ghana Health Service.

== Career ==
=== Ghana Health Service ===
Kuma-Aboagye was appointed Director-General of the Ghana Health Service by President Nana Akufo-Addo on 25 November 2019 to replace Dr. Anthony Nsiah-Asare who had been as the Presidential Advisor on Health. Prior to his appointment as Director-General, he was the Director for Family Health Division of the Ghana Health Service, a position he held from 2014 to 2019.

Medical appointments
Preceded by Anthony Nsiah-Asare	Director General of Ghana Health Service; November 2019–	Incumbent
