= The Sanitary Branch (Ghana) =

Early form of Ghana's Ministry of Health

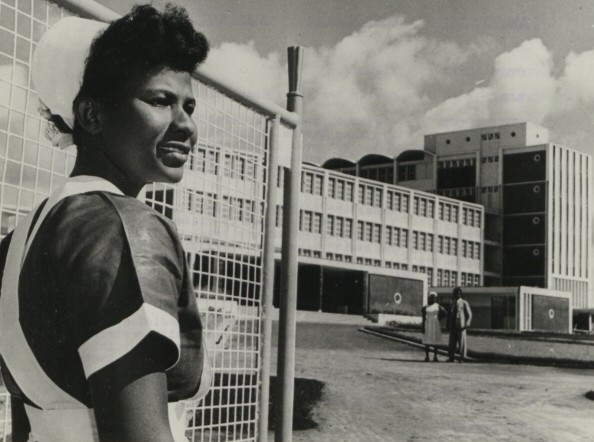
- A nurse outside a Kumasi hospital (1955)

Agency overview
- Formed: 1910
- Dissolved: 1957
- Superseding agency: Ministry of Health
- Jurisdiction: Gold Coast (present-day Ghana)
- Parent agency: The Medical Department

The Sanitary Branch of Ghana, established in 1910, was formed as a branch of the country's Medical Department when Ghana was a colony under the British. Today, the Ministry of Health in Ghana works to improve the health of the nation's citizens through the formulation of policies and introduction of programs aimed at promoting and increasing accessibility to health care. It functions in conjunction with the Ghanaian government, and overall works toward the continual development of the nation as a whole. The beginnings of a national health care system, currently in the form of the Ministry of Health, can be traced to the late 1800s and early 1900s. The British influence in Ghana marked the beginnings of a structured health care system with the implementation of the Medical Department, which included the formation of the Sanitary Branch.

== Purpose and main objectives ==
The original purpose of the Sanitary Branch, as part of the Medical Department, was to protect the Europeans living in the British West African colonies from becoming infected with and dying from tropical diseases, especially after the mass fear following the outbreak of the bubonic plague. The branch soon worked to protect the Ghanaian people as well, instilling sanitation reforms and offering vaccinations for the people of the colony. It also worked to instigate accessibility to clean and drinkable water, combat the infestation of mosquitoes, increase awareness about the maintenance of good health, and deal with the outbreak of epidemics.

== History ==
Prior to the arrival of the British, some Ghanaians treated diseases through methods involving magic, healers, and animal sacrifices. Health care was decentralized across many states, with any form of treatment being administered in the homes of the people instead of a hospital or clinic of some sort. The lack of a form of sanitation systems was also prevalent, with trash and human excrement scattered in public throughout the villages and the absence of a water pipe system or other method of dispensing clean water to the people. As a result, aside from the malaria and yellow fever carried by mosquitoes, dysentery, hookworm, and round worms were also common. On the other hand, the Ashanti Empire was recognised for its sanitation measures and organized medical practices.

The Gold Coast, one of the regions of the colony as designated by the British, was most involved in the development of a new health care system. A pre-medical department was formed initially, and in 1878, the Towns, Police, and Public Health Ordinance was enforced under its direction, initiating the construction and demolishing of infrastructure, draining of the streets, and issuing of fines to those that failed to comply with the heads of the colony. In 1893, a Public Works Department was introduced to implement a working sanitation system for the colony. Finally, in the 1880s, a Medical Department was formed, bringing about an introduction to a formal medical system, consisting of a Laboratory Branch for research, a Medical Branch of hospitals and clinics, and the Sanitary, or Health, Branch.

There were several figures involved in the establishment and primary direction of the Sanitary Branch. Joseph Chamberlain, Britain's Secretary of State for the Colonies, sought to combat the increasing mortality rates of the Europeans living overseas. It was under his command that Sanitary Branches became a part of all the British colonies in Africa. In order to accommodate for the limited resources of the colonies, however, Chamberlain took a gradual approach to establishing them, and most of the reform initially took place in areas with a higher population of Europeans. John Rodger, the governor of the Gold Coast in 1908, emphasized the importance of sanitation in the colonies, pushing for immediate reforms and became a key player in establishing its Sanitary Branch. Sir Hugh Clifford was a Gold Coast governor after Rodger and provided a similar outlook, seeking to increase accessibility of health care to the native Ghanaians as well. Clifford actively worked to implement sanitation reform starting in 1910, and under him, a doctor by the name T.E. Rice became the first to take charge of the Sanitary Branch.

== Structure ==
The Sanitary Branch was organized into tiers of officers and committees with varying responsibilities, structured as follows:

- Head administrators, consisting of a Principal Medical Officer, Senior Sanitary Officer, and Junior Sanitary Officer
- Medical Officers of Health and sanitary inspectors
- District Medical Officers
- Sanitary Committees
- Town Councils, including a medical officer, engineer, elected community members
- Director of Public Works

While the British held a majority of the branch's leadership positions, the Ghanaians also held positions as part of the branch, including:

- Sanitary Superintendent
- Sanitary Inspectors
- Village Overseers

== Policies and programs ==
=== Sanitation ===
Sanitation reform had been a pressing concern for the British as they set to establish the branch. In 1910, they passed the Sanitary Legislative Ordinances, adding more over time, and had eight ordinances by about 1925. The Sanitary Legislative Ordinances would remain in effect until 1950. These laws simply outlined basic sanitary practices, laying the foundation for the progress that would ensue during the 1900s. Throughout the first half of the twentieth century, the colony moved from extensive use of pan latrines towards the utilization of a water-carriage and septic tank disposal system.

=== Access to water ===
With concern to accessibility to water supply and providing clean water to the villages, action taken to instill new methods was initiated in the 1920s through the spread of water wells, and later, water tanks. Governor Gordon Guggisberg implemented a ten-year program consisting of a pipe system with drains constructed out of concrete. The operation of water systems soon spread to other regions of the colonies, such as the Northern Territories that would later on become a part of Ghana as well. In 1936, the colony experienced the greatest expansion in distributing water via pipes, attributable to the work of Guggisberg.

=== Mosquitoes ===
Another of the first policies undertaken by the branch was the Mosquito Ordinance, established in 1911, directed at the persistence of malaria and yellow fever and the pervasive nature of the mosquitoes as a whole. It detailed that homes could be subject to inspection to ensure that families maintained cleanliness of the home, and for the possible presence of mosquito larvae. Groups nicknamed "mosquito brigades" played a major role in inspecting the houses. People were at risk of being fined if they failed to comply, or if larvae were found in their home. This then led to the formation of a formal drainage system, to drain the swamps and boggy areas inhabited by the mosquitoes.

=== Education ===
In the 1920s, as Guggisberg continued to take charge in spreading awareness about the importance of sanitation, sanitary education became a major component of the drive towards the maintenance of good health for future generations. Under a law passed in 1925, teachers had to adhere to requirements, including certain credentials and reaching a particular level of educational attainment before being able to teach. For the advancement of health and hygiene awareness, "Health Weeks" and "Health Days" were implemented in educational systems in order for students to focus on the importance and long-term effects of being healthy and maintaining good personal hygiene. The students received pamphlets written by members of the Sanitary Branch, outlining good eating habits. Another goal of the Sanitary Branch had been to increase the number of people that qualified as sanitary inspectors, leading to the formation of the Accra Sanitary School and the School of Hygiene in order for the Ghanaians to become well-versed in proper sanitary practices.

=== Welfare clinics ===
Another advancement took place in the form of the Infant Welfare and Maternity Clinics, which were designed to counteract the high mortality rates of infants and their mothers due to lack of proper care. In the mid-1920s, Governor Guggisberg agreed to opening special centers for infants, as well as starting a visit service for mothers, available through the volunteer services of a group of African women. The formation of the clinics sparked an increase in benefits for infants, but also in the availability of care for their mothers, and education on the best methods for caring for children. With the rise of these clinics also came the formation of groups such as the Ladies of the Gold Coast League of Maternal and Child Welfare that worked for the cause of further encouraging the Ghanaians to have healthy lifestyles.

== Challenges ==
The Sanitary Branch faced challenges as it took on policies and initiatives for the betterment of the colony. Monetary concerns were perhaps the most significant challenge to the development of the sanitation systems and programs. Increasing amounts of money were necessary in order to bring forth a more sophisticated system that encouraged healthier practices, effectively prevented disease, and promoted the health of the colony as a whole, sparking conflict among the various branches of the Medical Department as they competed for funding. In addition, World War I, World War II, and the Great Depression caused increased difficulty due to the decrease in revenue.

Another major challenge relates to the cultural barriers stemming from colonization which affected the development of the policies and programs. For the native Ghanaians, their methods of dealing with death and diseases were common ways of life. However, as the British became a more stable presence, the Ghanaian practices were transformed and they had to abide by a new set of standards, as with the introduction of vaccinations as a preventive measure against disease, for example. At the same time, initially, without educating the Ghanaians and reaching a mutual understanding on the importance of clean water measures and sanitation systems, there was some resistance to the changes taking place, such as towards the inspectors involved in searching through homes, as instructed to do under the Mosquito Ordinance.

Overcrowding and the high concentrations of people in urban areas also contributed a challenge to implementation of programs. With people living so closely together, the likelihood of transmitting diseases was greater, and the lack of space translated to fewer areas for disposal of excrement. Poor living conditions also affected the extent to which the Infant Welfare Centers were effective, since infants and young children were highly susceptible to the diseases around them because of the lack of space and sewage.

== Lasting impact ==
In 1953, the Medical Department became the nation's Ministry of Health, and continued to develop upon the foundation it had initiated while under the Medical Department. Its current mission is "to contribute to socio-economic development and the development of a local health industry by promoting health and vitality through access to quality health for all people living in Ghana using motivated personnel." The implementation of a health care system, though it may have developed gradually, and preventive measures such as the implementation of sanitary and water supply systems and policies, as well as the provision of vaccinations, have translated to today's health care system in Ghana. The Ministry of Health continues to write policies pertaining to health issues, distribute services to its people, and assess conditions for hazards to health throughout the country. Under its Sector Medium Term Development Plan, some of its objectives focus on maternal and infant welfare, and the promotion of a healthy lifestyle, tracing back to the Sanitary Branch's original goals formed at the beginning of the twentieth century.

== See also ==
- Water supply and sanitation in Ghana
