= Nsiah Asare =

Ghanaian medical officer

Anthony Nsiah-Asare
- President: Nana Akuffo-Addo

Personal details
- Born: Ghana
- Party: New Patriotic Party

Anthony Nsiah-Asare is a Ghanaian medical officer, academic and health management expert. He has worked in the Ghanaian health sector for close to forty years serving at various management levels. He was the Director General of the Ghana Health Service. He is a member of the New Patriotic Party and was the Presidential Advisor on Health to Nana Akufo-Addo.

== Career ==
Anthony Nsiah-Asare prior to his current appointment has worked in the health sector spanning over 36 years in senior management position. He has also worked as a Surgical Specialist at the St Patrick Hospital in Offinso-Ashanti and Tamale Teaching Hospital.

The one time chief executive officer of the Komfo Anokye Teaching Hospital (KATH) also worked as a Consultant General Surgeon for the same hospital. Between 1997 and 2001, Dr Nsiah-Asare served as a part-time lecturer in Clinical Anatomy at the University for Development Studies (UDS), School of Medical Sciences, Tamale.

=== Ghana Health Service ===
President Nana Akufo-Addo appointed Dr Anthony Nsiah-Asare as the Director-General of the Ghana Health Service with effect from March 1, 2017 taking over from Dr. Ebenezer Appiah-Denkyira who had retired from active service. He handed over to Dr. Patrick Aboagye in November 2019 and was appointed as the Presidential Advisor on Health.

== See also ==
- Ghana Health Service
- Komfo Anokye Teaching Hospital

Medical appointments
Preceded by Ebenezer Appiah-Denkyira	Director General of Ghana Health Service; March 2017 - November 2019	Succeeded by Patrick Kuma-Aboagye
