= Volunteer Partnerships for West Africa =

- Founded: 2007
- Founder: Hayford Siaw
- Purpose: Humanitarian
- Location: Accra, Ghana
- Region served: West Africa
- Method: Volunteer placement
- Website: www.vpwa.org

Volunteer Partnerships for West Africa (VPWA) is a non-profit non-governmental organization based in Ghana.

== History ==
Volunteer Partnerships for West Africa was founded in 2007 by Ghanaian social entrepreneur Hayford Siaw.

== Programs ==
=== Microfinance and leasing ===
VPWA set up its microfinance arm in 2009, called MicroQuips, offering microloans to entrepreneurs as a measure against poverty. In the first year of the program, VPWA secured 80 loans for the women of Ghana, loaning out ₵11,126 (US$7,650 in 2010).

=== Green Ghana Volunteers ===
Started in 2010, Green Ghana Volunteers is a project involving the planting of Moringa oleifera trees around the region. By planting the moringa trees on a large scale, the project tries to create jobs and, in the process, potentially rehabilitates degraded land.
