= Early history of Ghana =

History of Ghana from the Paleolithic era until British colonization

Ghana was initially referred to as the Gold Coast. After attaining independence, the country's first sovereign government named the state after the Ghana Empire in modern Mauritania and Mali. Gold Coast was initially inhabited by different states, empires and ethnic groups before its colonization by the British Empire. The earliest known physical remains of the earliest man in Ghana were first discovered by archaeologists in a rock shelter at Kintampo during the 1960s. The remains were dated to be 5000 years old and it marked the period of transition to sedentism in Ghana. Early Ghanaians used Acheulean stone tools as hunter gatherers during the Early stone age. These stone tools evolved throughout the Middle and Late Stone Ages, during which some early Ghanaians inhabited caves.

Sedentism was first established between 2000 and 500 BC, where crops such as Sorghum and millet were farmed. The earliest towns and cities generally arose by the 11th century. Some of these towns were located at strategic trade locations such as Begho on the Trans-Saharan trade route and Elmina, a source of trade during the Atlantic slave trade. States were formed beginning in the 11th century, with some of the earliest being the Kingdom of Dagbon and Bono. European contact with the Gold Coast begun in the 15th century with the Portuguese landing on the Coast. Several European states established colonies on portions of the Gold Coast. By the 20th century, the British Empire had colonized the entire region after annexing the Ashanti Empire in the War of the Golden Stool.

== Pre-history ==
=== Early Stone Age ===
The oldest tools discovered by archaeologists in Ghana were found in the fossil gravels of the river Volta, Dayi, Oti and Birim. Others were found on a fossil marine beach at Asoprochona, near Tema. The oldest of these stone tools were large, heavy pearl shaped tools called Acheulean handaxes and U-shaped tools called Acheulian cleavers. These tools were used for hunting, food procurement and meat preparation.

=== Middle Stone Age ===
Technology used by the Acheulian tool makers improved vastly in the Middle Stone Age period. Tools were reshaped for the production of axes, pick-axes, choppers, scrappers, and hand axes. In the grassland of Northern Ghana, flake tools were produced, and it included knives and arrowheads. The use of these new tools, to some extent, relied on the environmental conditions in which they found themselves. The improvement in man's tool making technique enabled the early stone age man to migrate from the Savannah region to the forest zone. In the grassland and forest regions of middle and southern Ghana, the Sangoan cultural tradition prevailed as a result.

=== Late Stone Age ===
There was innovation in the manufacturing of blade tools during this period that helped in the production of fishing and hunting equipment. Archaeology finds has established that Ghanaians, during the late stone age period, hunted for animals such as guinea pig, royal antelope, bears and chimpanzee through the use of traps and poisoned arrowheads. It was during the period that man established his home in caves and rocks. Plants used in the preparation of food like the nettle tree, incense tree and the oil palm also survived in rock shelters and caves.

=== Early Iron Age ===
African prehistory is divided into two “ages”, namely the Stone Age succeeded by the Iron Age, and each is subdivided into early, middle and late stages. The Iron Age is characterized by the use of iron technology. Peculiar to the Iron Age in Sub-Saharan Africa is that it directly succeeded the Stone Age. There is no period of experimentation with copper metallurgy, hence, there is no evidence of a preceding Bronze Age to the Iron Age. It thus appears that iron metallurgy was introduced into the African continent from Mediterranean craftsmen.

The Iron Age marks the addition of metallurgy to the technical repertoire of sub-Sahara African people, as stated above. The process of iron smelting is complex and represents a significant improvement in technological capability. Archeologists have identified the important role of iron in agriculture by enabling forest clearance and cultivation of difficult soils.

The knowledge of the Early Iron Age in Ghana is still quite limited. It derives from just a few excavated sites. As a result of that, the understanding of the social and economic consequences of iron technology on societies in Sub-Sahara Africa is limited too, also because of the primary focus on antiquity and diffusion. The Early Iron Age sites are identified based on ceramics distinct from those of the middle, and later Iron Age. The ceramics of the Early Iron Age in eastern and southern Africa belong to one style system: with the same motif combinations, in the same position on the same kind of shapes. This was discovered at the beginning of Iron Age studies and is used as evidence of a common historical origin. This type of interpretation is based on the premise that, at anyone time, an ethnic group can be identified by stylistic features. This also justifies the assumption that the identity of the producer is the same as the user.

The earliest evidence of iron in northern Ghana is at Daboya, but it has also been found at other sites in central Ghana, such as Atwetwebooso, Abam, Amuowi Rockshelter, Abam, Bonoso, and New Buipe. Excavations at Coconut Grove on the southern coast have revealed iron slag in association with ceramics, stone beads, and quarts. The scale of production has been significantly larger in northern and central Ghana. It is, however, important to note that even small-scale smelting has meant significant tree-cutting and charcoal production for fueling iron smelting furnaces. The processes required for iron production: tree felling, charcoal production, slag waste accumulation, and the employment of iron tools in agriculture likely increased the intensity and pace of landscape alteration as well.

It is important to add a critical note on the western concept of the Iron Age. The production of iron did not replace the use of stone tools. On the coast, the quartz tool industry was maintained, and polished stones were also found. Archeological assemblages do not fit neatly into technological “Ages”. Terms such as “Iron Age” have their origin in unilineal cultural evolution and European prehistory, and cannot be copy pasted to the West-African archeological contexts.

=== First Settlers ===
Due to a lack of a writing system implemented during the Stone Age in Ghana, archaeologists have scanty knowledge of Stone Age farming in Ghana. Food production was borrowed from the Sahara and Sahel savannah regions. Excavations executed by Pre-historians which took place in the rock shelters of Kintampo and Hani in the Brong-Ahafo region, as well as at Ntereso, near Tamale, have presented evidence of farming activity during the stone age. Between 2000 and 500 BC, pre-historic Ghanaians were believed to have reared dwarf goats, cattle, and guinea fowls. They also collected yams and cowpeas. Indigenous food items in pre-colonial Ghana included sorghum, millet, West African rice, yellow and white yam, oil palm and shea butter. The presence of fishing equipment such as harpoons proved that pre-historic Ghanaians also practiced fishing. Excavations have again revealed that since hunting equipment like polished arrowheads has been found, it was an evidence that hunting was another form of occupation during this period. Between 2000 BC and 500 Bc, pre-historic Ghanaians discarded the practiced of nomadism as well as living in caves and rock shelters, preferring to settle in villages. Pre historic houses in Ghana were built with fossil mud, laterite blocks and stone blocks. The Wattle and daub architectural style, which was famous among states such as the Ashanti Empire, dates back to at least 6,000 years. Examples of early Ghanaian homes include settlements discovered at the Boyase Hill, Nkukua Buoho, Hani in Brong Ahafo and at Gambaga in the Northern Region. The first farmers and settlers also made baked clay pottery or ceramic arts. A stone axe or celt known locally as Nyame Dua was used by the settlers to fell trees, clear bushes and cultivate plants. The celt was usually cylindrical and shaped by using green stones called Calchlorite schist.

== Growth of Towns ==
=== Begho ===
Town development in pre-colonial Ghana begun around 1000 and 1700 AD. The first major towns that existed in pre-colonial Ghana included Begho, Bono Manso, Dawhenya and Elmina. The growth of these towns were influenced by factors such as their strategic location, economic and religious attractions, and the presence of large deposits of minerals such as gold and iron. Begho for example, developed due to its location on the Trans-Saharan trade route. By AD 1650, Begho had developed with a population of about 10,000 with varying ethnic groups from other regions such as Cote d'Ivoire and Mali. Archaeological evidence made available from Begho has established that the people had commercial contacts with the outside world early in their history. Imported goods excavated in Begho include goods of Dutch, Chinese, English Venetian and Egyptian origin. Excavations have laid bare-walled structures dated between 1350 and 1750 AD, as well as pottery of all kinds, smoking pipes, and evidence of iron smelting. Begho was one of the largest towns in the southern part of West Africa at the time of the arrival of the Portuguese in 1471.

=== Le and Se ===
Around 1300, small towns Le and Se also developed in Dawhenya and the Shai Hills. By 1650, Le had grown to a size that measured 1.6 kilometers by 1.1 kilometer, while Se grew to 9 kilometers by 2 kilometers. The region in which these towns developed lacked fertile lands for agricultural activities. It was instead rich in Kaolin clay. This enabled the women of the area to use the kaolin clay to manufacture cooking pots, bowls, water jars, palm wine vessels and pots for brewing traditional medicine for people in the Accra plains, Akuapem and Shai. The abundance of kaolin clay attracted several migrants into the town, which led to its growth. Between 1600 and 1750, the towns engaged in trade with both the local population and Europeans. Archaeological findings from the 17th century in these towns have revealed that the people of le and Se reared cattle, sheep, goats and fowls.

=== Elmina ===
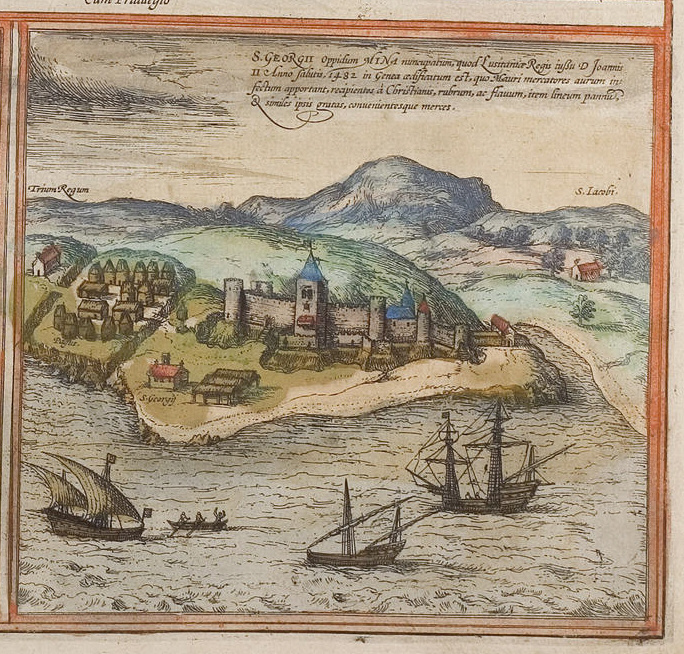
Elmina Castle viewed from the sea in 1572, by Georg Braun.

As a result of European presence and the development of the Trans-Atlantic slave trade, Elmina grew to possess a population of over 2000 from the 15th and 16th centuries. The town was governed by a chief and council of elders whiles protected by a standing army. Early Portuguese writers like Joao de Barros and Pacheco Pereira described the 15th century settlement as a "Republican township" made up of several settlements.

=== Kumasi ===
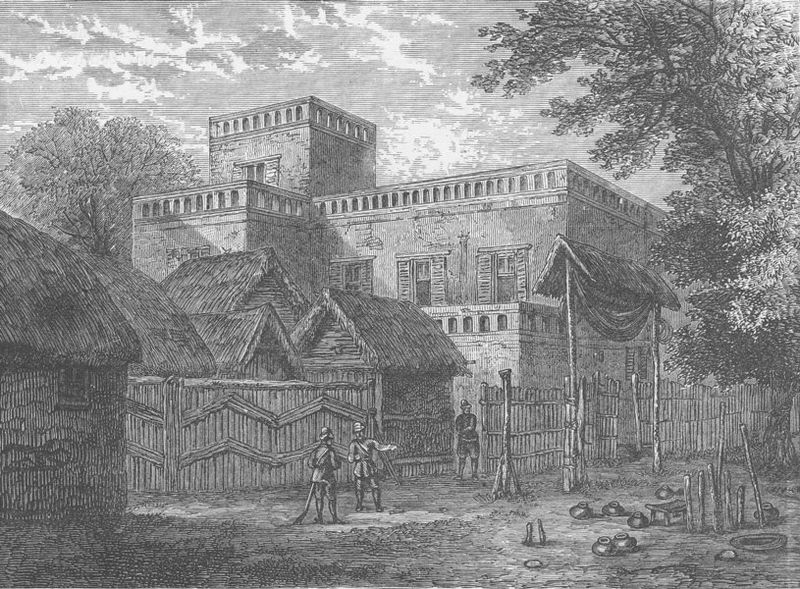
The Palace of the Asantehene, located at the centre of Kumasi, was built in 1822 by king Osei Bonsu until its destruction in the Anglo-Ashanti wars.

Kumasi was established by the first Ashanti king, Osei Kofi Tutu I, along with the state priest, Okomfo Anokye, in the 17th century. It is on record that Kumasi was viewed as the most impressive town on the Gold Coast by visiting British officials, largely as a result of its well-designed buildings and organized roads. The city was the capital of the Ashanti Empire. Kumasi was located on two major trade routes; one from Mali and the other from Hausaland. This strategic location influenced its growth.

== Early States ==
=== Kingdom of Dagbon ===
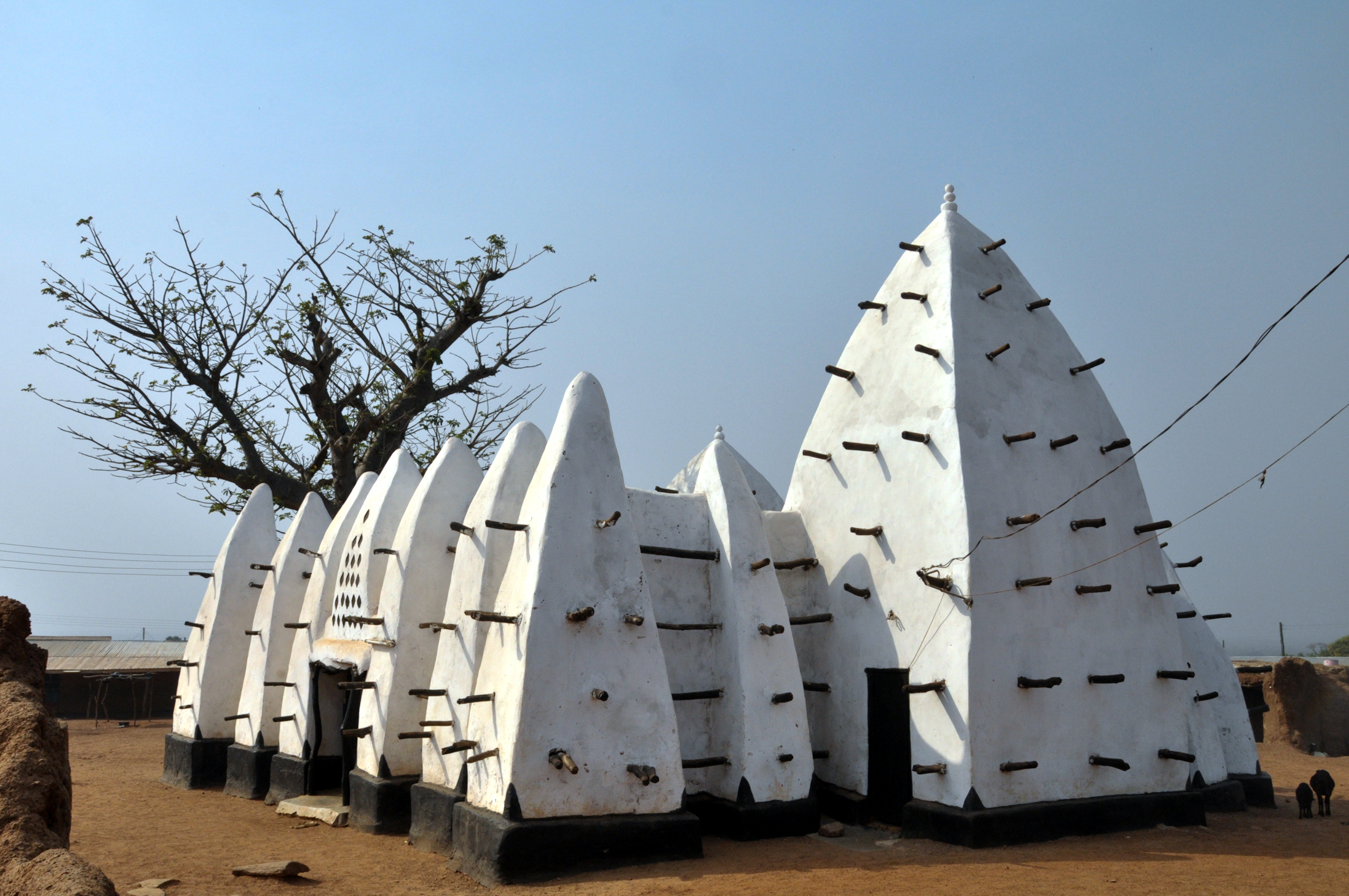
The Larabanga Mosque, completed in 1421, is one of the oldest mosques in West Africa.

According to oral history, the Kingdom of Dagbon was formed in 1480. The people practiced a patrilineal system of inheritance. Trade was established with the Hausa states and Mali Empire. Islam was introduced into the kingdom between the 15th and 17th centuries by Mande and Soninke Muslim traders.

=== Bono State ===
The Bono state grew powerful as a result of its location among the trade routes of the Trans Saharan trade. Its major city, Begho, was of significance as an entrepot frequented by northern caravans from the Mali Empire around 1100 AD. Goods traded included ivory, salt, leather, gold, kola nuts, cloth, and copper alloys.

=== Akwamu ===
Oral accounts place the formation of the Akwamu state between the 16th and 17th centuries. Akwamu established its capital at Asamankese, where it expanded as a result of the lack of strong competition among its neighbors. By 1500, Akwamu was involved with gold trade among Europeans at Elmina. The Akwamu created an empire which peaked in 1710, extending 400 kilometres (250 mi) along the coast from Ouidah, Benin in the East to Winneba, Ghana in the West.

=== Denkyira ===
According to oral accounts, the Denkyira state was formed by migrants from the Bono state after its collapse. Initially, the state was a vassal to Adanse, but it won its independence in a war against Adanse. The state embarked on expansionism by absorbing smaller groups, such as the Ashanti, Sewhi, and Adanse.

=== Ashanti Empire ===
The Ashanti Empire was formed from a union of various city states against the rule of Denkyira. Most of these states were initially tributaries of the Denkyira state. The Ashanti union became independent following its victory over Denkira at the Battle of Feyiase. By the 1680s, the Ashanti union had formed as a kingdom. Kumasi was also declared as the capital of this kingdom. From the 18th century, the Ashanti embarked on an expansionist policy like the Denkyira, conquering a chunk of modern day Ghana as well as some parts of Ivory Coast and Togo. By the 20th century, the Ashanti Empire was annexed by the British Empire after its defeat in the Anglo Ashanti war.

=== Ga-Adangbe states ===
The Ga lived in scattered communities until the 17th century, where a kingdom emerged centered at Accra. Ayawaso became the capital of the kingdom of Accra whiles smaller settlements like Osu and Tema grew around the capital. Initially, the Ga-Adangbe did not have chiefs. Family heads of various settlements which were grouped into quarters known as akutsei, were responsible for the welfare of the people. Real authority resided among the traditional priests. The Ga were later influenced by Akan chieftaincy institutions, including the adoption of chiefs in their political system.

=== Ewe states ===
Eweland was made up of 120 states by the 17th century. By the end of the century, some large states had emerged, with the Anlo being the largest. Although the Ewe did not form a centralized kingdom, they cooperated in times of danger. These alliances were normally dissolved after the danger was resolved. In 1783, the Anlo came into conflict with the Danes, where they were conquered into the Danish Empire. The Danes later sold their possessions on the Gold Coast to the British by 1850. The Anlo State became part of Southern Ghana when the British proclaimed the territory as a Crown Colony in 1874. Much of the other Ewelands were annexed by Germany following the Berlin Conference. In 1921, these areas were taken over by Britain as a mandated colony of the League of Nations.

=== European colonies ===
Trade between the natives of Ghana and European states began in the 15th century. In 1481, King John II of Portugal commissioned Diogo de Azambuja to build the Elmina Castle, which was completed in three years. By 1598, the Dutch had joined the Portuguese in the gold trade, establishing the Dutch Gold Coast, where they fortified their position at Komenda and Kormantsi. In 1617, the Dutch captured the Olnini Castle from the Portuguese, along with Fort St Anthony in 1642.

By the mid-17th century, other European traders had entered the gold trade with the natives of the Gold Coast. Most notable among them were the Swedes, who established the Swedish Gold Coast, and Denmark-Norway, who established the Danish Gold Coast. Because of the abundance of gold in the area, Portuguese merchants named the region as Costa do Ouro or Gold Coast. The Gold Coast was a strategic location during the Atlantic slave trade. The Portuguese, Swedish, Dano-Norwegians, Dutch, and German traders erected more than thirty forts and castles in the region, with the last, Germans, establishing the German Gold Coast.

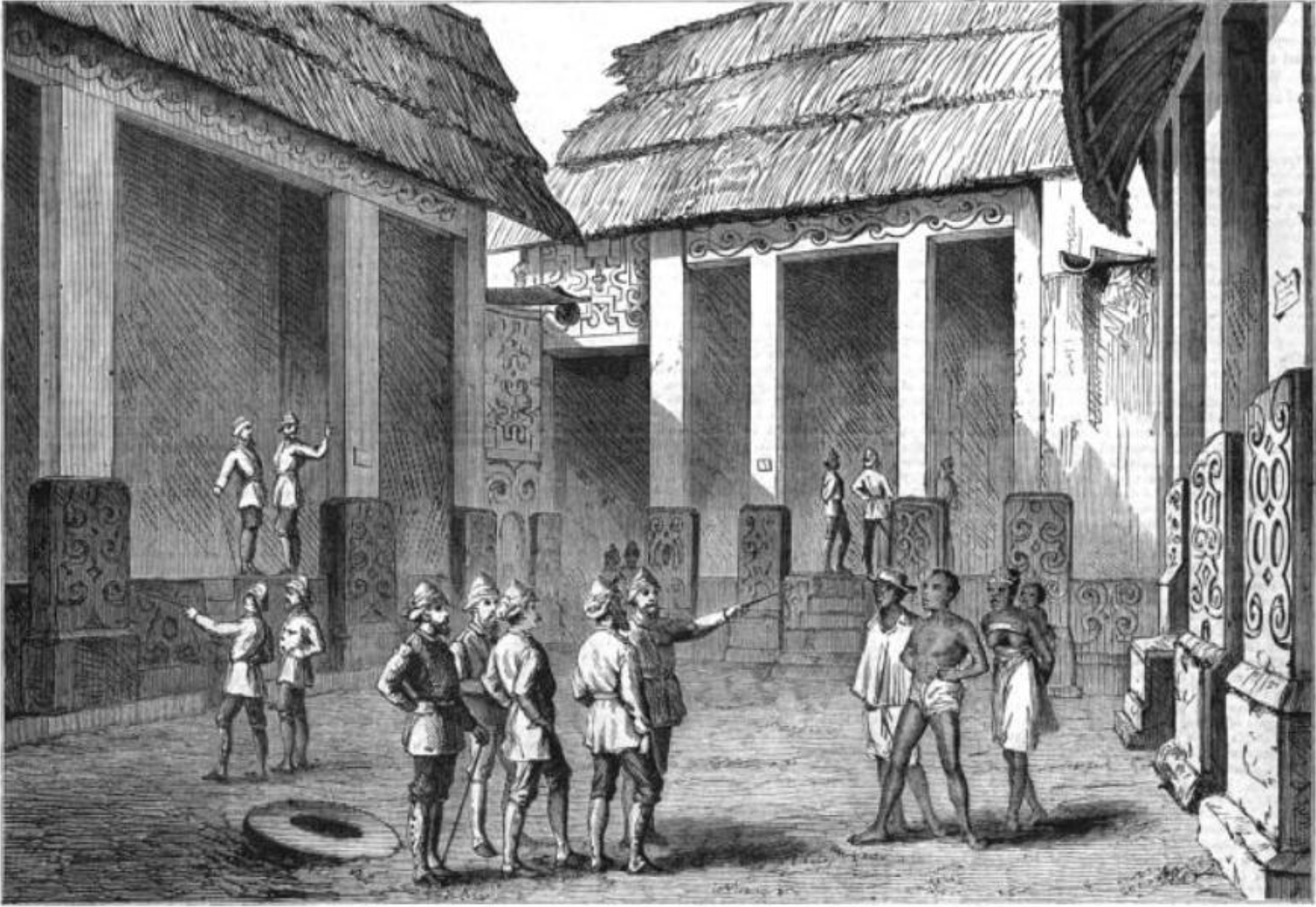
British soldiers ransack an Ashanti palace at Fomena in 1874.

In 1874, the British Empire took control of some areas of the country, naming them the British Gold Coast. The British defeated the Ashanti in the War of the Golden Stool and by 1902, the entire of the Gold Coast region was a colony of Britain.
