= Ministry of Health (Ghana) =

Government ministry of Ghana

Coordinates: 5.552422°N 0.196287°W

MoH
- Ministry of Health

Agency overview
- Formed: 1957
- Jurisdiction: Republic of Ghana
- Headquarters: Accra, Ghana
- Minister responsible: Hon. Kwabena Mintah Akandoh
- Website: Official Website

The Ministry of Health (MoH) is the government ministry of Ghana that is responsible for the health of Ghanaians. It is involved in providing public health services, managing Ghana's healthcare industry, and building Ghana's hospitals and medical education system.

Ministry main offices are located in Accra.

Sekou Toure Avenue, North Ridge adjacent the National Health Insurance Head Office Accra

The ministry is responsible for all health related issues in Ghana. It was responsible for direct public health service delivery or provision in the country. However, with the enactment of an ACT 525 of parliament, the functions of promotion, preventive, curative and rehabilitative care have been delegated to the Ghana Health Service and Teaching hospitals. Hence, the ministry is now responsible for only policy formulation, monitoring and evaluation, resource mobilization and regulation of the health service delivery in the country.

== History ==
The ministry was established in 1957. It was responsible for direct health delivery and all health related issues in Ghana. After gaining independence in 1957 Dr. Kwame Nkrumah abolished colonial fee paying practices and introduced free healthcare as part of socialist development strategy. Joseph Henry Allassani was appointed the first minister of health on 6th March, 1957. The ministry also handled promotion, prevention, treatment and rehabilitation.

== Agencies ==
Ministry agencies include:

- Ghana Medical and Dental Council
- Pharmacy Council Ghana
- Ghana Registered Nurses and Midwives Association (GRNMA)
- Alternative Medicine Council(AMC)
- Foods and Drug Authority (FDA)
- Private Hospitals and Maternity Homes Board
- National Health Insurance Authority (NHIA)
- Ghana National Drugs Programme
- Ghana Health Service (GHS)
- Allied Health Professions Council (APHC)
- Occupational Therapy Association Of Ghana
- Ghana National Ambulance Service
- Tamale Teaching Hospital
- Korle-Bu Teaching Hospital
- Komfo Anokye Teaching Hospital
- Ho Teaching Hospital
- Centre for Plant Medicine Research
- Psychology Council
- Ghana Medical and Dental Council
- Nurses and Midwifery Council

== Functions of the Ministry ==
- Formulate Health Policies.
- Sets standards for delivery of health care in the country.
- Provide strategic directions for health delivery services.
- Monitor and evaluate health service delivery by the Ghana Health Service and the Teaching Hospitals, other Agencies, Development Partners and the private sector.
- Develop policies for the practice of Traditional and Alternate Medicine in the country
- Allocate resources to all health care delivery agencies under the ministry.
- Make proposals for the review and enactment of health legislation.
- Source funding for service delivery, through GOG, Health Insurance, and International Community.
- Provide framework for the regulation of food, drug and health service delivery and practice.
- Provide framework for the effective and efficient procurement, distribution, management and use of health sector goods and services.

== Projects ==
=== Construction and Equipping of 597-Bed University Hospital At Legon ===
Former President John Dramani Mahama inaugurated the University of Ghana Medical Centre (UGMC) in 2016. The hospital, with a capacity of 597 beds, was initiated in 2012. After he was out of office in 2017, the project was left dormant until an approval of $50 million was granted by Parliament to finalize the remaining construction at the University of Ghana Medical Centre (UGMC).

Mr. Agyemang-Manu, the Health Minister also assured Ghanaians that the government is dedicated to delivering a high-quality healthcare system and infrastructure. He emphasized that no opportunity to achieve this goal would be overlooked or compromised.

=== Implementation of the National E-Health Project ===
This project was initiated by the Ministry to ease the challenges of hospitals in managing patients data and sensitive information.

== Heads of the Ministry (Fourth Republic) ==
Name	Duration	Profession	Political Party	Deputy
Dr. George Sipa-Adjah Yankey	2009 – 2009	Lawyer and Politician	NDC	Benjamin Kunbuor
Benjamin Kunbuor	2009 - 2011	Politician, Legal scholar	NDC	Dr. Nii Oakley Quaye-Kumah
Joseph Yieleh Chireh	2011 – 2012	Pharmacist, Lawyer, Diplomat and Politician	NDC	Robert Joseph Mettle-Nunoo
Alban Bagbin	2012 – 2013	Politician	NDC	Robert Joseph Mettle-Nunoo
Hanny Sherry Ayittey	2013 – 2014	Biochemist, Politician and Women's Activists	NDC	Dr. Alfred Sugri Ti
Kwaku Agyemang-Mensah	2014 – 2015	Politician	NDC	Victor Asare Bampoe
Alex Segbefia	2015 – 2017	Lawyer and Politician	NDC	Victor Asare Bampoe
Kwaku Agyemang-Manu	2017 – 2024	Chartered Management Accountant	NPP	Tina Gifty Naa Ayeley Mensah Mahama Asei Seini Bernard Okoe-Boye
Bernard Okoe - Boye	2024 - 2025	Medical Doctor and Politician	NPP	Adelaide Ntim Alexander Akwasi Acquah
Kwabena Mintah Akandoh	2025 – Present	Politician	NDC	Grace Ayensu- Danquah

== Laws passed ==
Ghana Health Service and Teaching Hospitals, Act, 1996 (Act 525) established Ghana Health Service to oversee the administration of public healthcare and handle the operational governance of the country's major teaching hospitals.

Health Institutions and Facilities Act, 2011 (Act 829) created the Health Facility Regulatory Agency (HeFRA) to incense, inspect and to enforce standards across all public and private health facilities in Ghana.

Public health Act, 2012 (Act 852) a consolidated law designed to prevent diseases, handle communicable and non-communicable threats, and protect human and animal health. It provides a legal mandate for the Food and Drug Authority (FDA) to regulate medical devices and clinical trails.

Tobacco Control Regulations Act, 2016 (L.I 2247) a subsidiary instrument passed under the Act 851 that bans public smoking, outlaws tobacco advertisement, and establishes strict warning labels on tobacco packaging.

National Health Insurance Act, 2012 (Act 852) repealed older frameworks to fortify the National Health Insurance Authority (NHIA) providing a formal structure for managing the country's universal health insurance scheme and regulating private health insurance providers.

Mental Health Act,2012 (Act 846) created the Mental Health Authority to decentralize psychiatric care, establish the Mental Health Board, and safeguard the human right of the people living with mental health conditions.

Traditional Medicine Act, 2000 (575) established a regulatory council to monitor, register and formulize the practices of indigenous herbal and traditional medicine clinicians.

Health Professionals Regulatory Bodies Act 2013 (Act 857) consolidates the legal frameworks for medical practitioners across multiple sub sectors. It outlines the specific mandate for bodies like Allied Health Professional Council, Medical and Dental Council, Nurses and Midwifery council.

== Initiatives Undertaken ==
In collaboration with Government of Japan, the Ministry of Health launched three major initiates aimed at strengthening Ghana's national resilience. The initiatives focus was improving the country's healthcare system, promoting the responsible use of artificial intelligence (AI) in the health sector and supporting peacebuilding effort.

The ministry of Health supported the implementation of the World Bank Group's "Fit to Prosper" regional health strategy, which aims at strengthen health systems, enhance access to health care services, and address health care workforce shortages in Ghana and other West and Central African countries.

Under the government's Labour and Exchange Programme, the Ministry of Health facilitated the deployment of 130 Ghanaian Health Professionals to Antigua on a three-year contracts, aimed at creating employment opportunities and strengthening Ghana's international health workforce engagement.

The Ministry of health, in collaboration with the Ghana Health Service, GIZ, AYA Integrated Healthcare Initiative launched the first National Non-Communicable Diseases(NCDs) Research Conference to develop a national NCD research agenda, promote collaborative research, and strengthen evidence-based policies for the prevention and control of non-communicable diseases in Ghana.

The Ministry of Health has procured 24,534 medical equipment items for distribution to health facilities nationwide in preparation for the government's free primary health care initiatives. The equipment, including; diagnostic, laboratory, maternal and neonatal care devices, is intended to strengthen primary healthcare service delivery and improve access to essential health services across Ghana.

The Ministry of Health implemented the QualityRights initiative to promote mental health, human rights and recovery-oriented care through a three-year e-training and coaching programme for mental health. The aim is to strengthen person-centered, rights-based mental healthcare in Ghana.

The Ministry of Health supported the launch of the Ghana Medical Trust Fund (MahamaCares), an initiative established to provide financial assistance for treatment of chronic non-communicable diseases not covered by the National Health Insurance Scheme(NHIS). The Fund also supports in health infrastructure, medical equipment, specialist training, and research to improve access to quality healthcare in Ghana.

The Ministry of Health though the Ghana Health Service partnered with the Ghana Red Cross Society to launch the Resilient and Empowered African Community Health(REACH) project. The initiative includes the strategic deployment of 2,300 community health workers across the Volta, Western, Ashanti, and other priority regions. The initiative aim is to strengthen community health systems and improve the delivery of primary healthcare services across Ghana.

== Achievements ==
The National Ambulance Service has established a comprehensive nationwide emergency response system through a three-tier operational structure consisting of a national headquarters, 16 regional offices, and district level ambulance stations. It also operates nine emergency dispatch control rooms that coordinate ambulance services across all 261 districts, ensuring nationwide access to pre-hospital emergency care.

The Ministry of Health introduced the Ghana Integrated Logistics Managements Information System (GhILMIS), an electronic supply chain management platform designs to improve healthcare delivery through more efficient coordination of demand and supply processes. The five-year strategic system aims to address challenged such as delays in procurement approvals and inadequate medic stock data, while improving demand forecasting, reducing administrative delays, and enhancing supply chain efficiency.

The Ministry played a key role in the establishment and expansion of the National Health Insurance Scheme, which provides financial protection and improves access to healthcare services for millions of Ghanaians by reducing out-of-pocket payments at the point of care.

Through reforms that created the Ghana Health Service(GHS), The ministry strengthened decentralized healthcare delivery, improving access to primary healthcare services at regional, district, and community levels, including community based Health Planning and Services initiative.

The Ministry has overseen major investments in health infrastructure, including the construction and completion of teaching hospitals and expansion of healthcare facilities to improve care and national coverage.

The Ministry has implemented digital health initiatives, including the National E-Health Project, aimed at improving patient data management, surveillance systems, and efficiency in healthcare services delivery.

The Ministry continues to lead national health reforms aimed at achieving Universal Health Coverage through policy frameworks that prioritize equity, preventive care, and improved access to essential health services for all citizens.

See also

- List of Hospitals in Ghana
- Minister for Health (Ghana)
- Health in Ghana
