= Ghana Health Service =

Ghanaian government body

GHS
- Ghana Health Service

Agency overview
- Formed: 1996
- Jurisdiction: Republic of Ghana
- Headquarters: Accra, Ghana
- Agency executives: Prof. Samuel Kaba Akoriyea, Director-General; Dr. Dr. Caroline Reindorf Amissah, Deputy Director-General
- Parent agency: Ministry of Health (Ghana)

The Ghana Health Service (GHS) is a Ghanaian government body established in 1996 as part of the Health Sector Reform of Ghana. The Health Service is under the Ministry of Health. The health service primarily administers the health services in Ghana provided by the government and implements government policies on healthcare. The current Director-General of the Health service is Prof. Samuel Kaba Akoriyea who was appointed by President John Mahama in 2025 to replace Dr. Patrick Kuma-Abogye.

== History ==
The Ghana Health Service (GHS) is a Public Service body established under Act 525 of 1996 as required by the 1992 constitution. It is an autonomous Executive Agency responsible for implementation of national policies under the control of the Ghana Minister for Health through its governing Council - the Ghana Health Service Council.

The GHS continue to receive public funds and thus remain within the public sector. However, its employees are no longer part of the civil service, and GHS managers are no longer required to follow all civil service rules and procedures. The independence of the Ghana Health Service is designed primarily to ensure that staffs have a greater degree of managerial flexibility to carry out their responsibilities then would be possible if they remained wholly within the civil service.

Ghana Health Service does not include Teaching Hospitals, Private and Missinand Hospitals. The establishment of the Ghana Health Service was an essential part of the key strategies identified in the Ghana Health Sector Reform process, as outlined in the Medium Term Health Strategy (MTHS), which were necessary steps in establishing a more equitable, efficient, accessible and responsive health care system.

The reforms build on the reorganization of the MOH that began in 1993, was explicitly designed to set the scene for the establishment of the Ghana Health Service. The reforms also provide a sound organizational framework for the growing degree of managerial responsibility that has already been delegated to districts and hospitals. Themes that were central to the reorganization of 1993 remain important today for the Ghana Health Service: careful stewardship of resources, clear lines of responsibility and control, decentralization, and accountability for performance rather than inputs.

== Mandate and objectivity ==
GHS to provide and prudently manage comprehensive and accessible health service with special emphasis on primary health care at Ghana regional, district and sub-district levels in accordance with approved national policies. The objects of the Service are to:

- Implement approved national policies for health delivery in Ghana.
- Increase access to good quality health services.
- Manage prudently resources available for the provision of the health services.

== Functions ==
For the purposes of achieving its objectives the GHS performs the following functions, amongst others:

Provide comprehensive health services at all levels in Ghana directly and by contracting out to other Ghana agencies. As part of this function, the GHS is:

- Develop appropriate strategies and set technical guidelines to achieve Ghana national policy goals/objectives.
- Undertake management and administration of the overall Ghana health resources within the service.
- Promote healthy mode of living and good health habits by people in Ghana.
- Establish effective mechanism for disease surveillance, prevention and control in Ghana.
- Determine charges for Ghana health services with the approval of the Ghana Minister of Health.
- Provide in-service training and continuing education in Ghana.
- Perform any other functions relevant to the promotion, protection and restoration of health in Ghana.

== Director-General ==
- Agyeman Badu Akosa (2002–2006)
- Caleb inkoom joseph (star) (2007–2012)
- Ebenezer Appiah Denkyia (2012–2017)*Anthony Nsiah-Asare (2017–2019)
- Patrick Kuma-Aboagye (2019–2025)
- Samuel Kaba Akoriyea (2025-present)

== Executive Leadership ==
- Dr. Samuel Kaba Akoriyea (Director General)
- Dr. Caroline Reindorf Amissah (Deputy Director General)

Divisional Directors

- Noble Dr. Kennedy T.C. Brightson (Director, Family Health Division)
- Mr. Mustafa Adams Hamidu (Director, Finance Division)
- Mrs. Mabel Kisiwaah Asafo (Ag. Director, Health Promotion
- Dr. Ebo Hammond (Director, Health Administration)
- Peter Obiri-Yeboah, Esq. (Director, Human Resource)
- Dr. Lawrence Ofori-Boadu (Director, Institutional Care Division)
- Mr. John Saben-Fosu (Director =, Internal Audit Division)
- Dr. Samuel Kwabena Boakye-Boateng (Director, Policy, Planning, Monitoring and Evaluation Division)
- Dr. Franklin Aseidu-Bekoe (Director, Public Health Division)
- Dr. Abraham Rexford Oduro (Director, Research and Development Division)
- Mrs. Araba Kudiabor (Director, Supplies, Stores and Drugs Division)

== Regional Directors ==
- Dr. Akosua Agyeiwaa Owusu-Sarpong (Ahafo region)
- Dr. Fred Adomako-Boateng (Ashanti region)
- Dr. Osei K. Afreh (Bono region)
- Dr. Marion Okoh-Owusu (Western region)
- Dr. (Mrs.) Alberta Adjebeng Biritwum-Nyarko (Centra region)
- Dr. Damien Punguyire (Eastern region)
- Dr. Robert Amesiya (Greater Accra region)
- Dr. Chrysantus Kubio (Northern region
- Dr. Godfred Kwabena Sarpong (North East region)
- Dr. Kofi Amo-Kodieh (Oti region)
- Dr. John Ekow-Otoo (Savannah region)
- Dr. Braimah Baba Abubakari (Upper East region)
  - Dr. Josephat Ana-Imwine Nyuzagl (Upper West region)
  - Dr. Emmanuel Atsu-Dodor (Voltar region)
  - Dr. (Med) Freeman Samson Samani (Bono East region)
  - Dr. Paulina Clara Appiah (Western North region)

== Council Members ==
- Prof. Fred Newton Binka (Chairman)
- Simon Awog-Bandek (Secretary)
- Dr. Samuel Kaba Akoriyea (Member)
- Dr. Amedi Kofi Micheal (Member)
- Akwasi Owusu-Mainu (Member)
- Dr. Belinda Afriyie Nimako (Member)
- Dela Kemevor (Member)
- Dr. Gina Teddy (Member)
- Dr. Munarawu Issahaque (Member)
- Franklin Owusu Ansah (Member)
- Hon. Richard Acheampong, MP (Member)
- Nana Ofori Ahenkan ll (Member)

== Regional directorates ==
The following are the directorates within the Ghana Health Service across the regions.

== Ashanti Region ==
- Districts
- Asanti Akyem
- Sekyere West
- Sekyere East
- Offinso
- Obuasi
- Kwabre

== Brong Ahafo Region ==
Districts:

- Wenchi
- Techiman
- Tano South
- Tano North
- Tain
- Sunyani

== Central Region ==
Districts

- Upper Denkyira
- Twifu-Hemang-Lower-Denkyira
- Twifo-Hemang-Lower-Denkyira
- Mfantseman
- Komenda-Edina-Eguafo-Abirem
- Gomoa

== Eastern Region ==
Districts:

- Yilo Krobo
- West Akim
- Upper Manya
- Suhum Kraboa Coaltar
- New Juaben Municipal
- New Juaben
- Lower Manya

== Greater Accra Region ==
Districts

- Tema Municipal
- Ga West
- Ga East
- Ga South
- Weija/Gbawe
- Dangme West
- Dangme East
- Accra Metropolitan

== Northern Region ==
Districts

- Zabzugu
- Tatale
- Yendi
- Savelugu
- Nanton
- Tolon
- Kumbungu
- Tamale Metropolitan
- Sagnarigu
- Karaga
- Gushegu
- Bimbilla
- Wulensi

== Upper East ==
Districts

- Talensi Nabdam
- Navrongo
- Kassen-Nankana West
- Kassena-Nankana
- Builsa
- Talensi

== Upper West ==
Districts

- Wa West
- Wa Municipal
- Wa East
- Nadowli-Kaleo
- Sissala West
- Sissala East
- Nandom
- Jirapa
- Lawra
- Daffiama Bussie Issa (DBI)
- Lambussie

== Volta Region ==
Districts

- South Tongu
- South Dayi
- North Tongu
- Nkwanta
- Krachi West
- Krachi East

== Western Region ==
Districts

- Wassa-Amenfi West
- Wassa-Amenfi East
- Wassa West
- Wassa Amenfi East
- Shama Ahanta East
- Sefwi Wiawso

== Divisions ==
Family Health Division (FHD)

Health Promotion Division (HPD)

Human Resource Development Division (HRDD)

Internal Audit Division (IAD)

Policy, Planning, Monitoring and Evaluation Division (PPME)

Research and Development Division (RDD)

Finance Division (FD)

Health Administration and Support Services Division (HASSD)

Institutiona Care Division (ICD)

Office of the Director General Division (ODGD)

Public Health Division (PHD)

Supply, Stores and Drugs Management Division (SSDMD)

Gender and Social Inclusion Unit

Disability-Inclusive Health Unit

== Ghana Health Service Associations ==
Health Information Technology Professionals Association, Ghana. (HITPAG)

HITPAG supports and promotes the productive, secure, and cost-effective use of state-of-the-art information technology and information management systems within the Ghana Health Service, including e-Learning applications, to further the goals and objectives of the service.

Ghana Medical Association (GMA)

The GMA is the official body representing medical doctors in Ghana. It promotes quality healthcare delivery, professional ethics, and the rights of medical practitioners across the country.

Ghana National Ambulance Service Association (GNASA)

GNASA support and promotes the professional growth and resource needs of ambulance and emergency medical workers in Ghana.

Mental Health Professionals Association (MHPA)

MHPA represents the psychologist, psychiatric nurses, and therapists, It focuses on promoting mental health awareness, advocacy, and professional development.

Ghana Public Health Association (GPHA)

GPHA is a leading advocate for health equity, disease prevention, and health promotion. Its members include public health expert, policy makers and NGOs.

Ghana Health Informatic Association (GHIA)

GHIA promotes the use of digital health solutions and data science in healthcare. Its members includes IT Specialist, data analysts, and health systems developers.

Ghana Registered Nurses and Midwives Association (GRNMA

GRNMA is the professional association representing nurses and midwives in Ghana. With over 50,000 members nation wide, it advocates tfor he professional development, welfare, and working conditions of its members.

Ghana Health andAllied Workers Union (GHAWU)

GHAWU focuses on ensuring fair labour practices and welfare support for all Allied health workers in Ghana's healthcare system.

Community Health NursesGroup (CHNG)

CHNG brings together community health professionals to advocate for rural healthcare, continuing education and outreach programs.

Ghana Medical Laboratory Professionals Association (GMLPA)

GMLPA champions the role of medical laboratory scientists diagnosis and public health. It provides capacity building and certification programs.

Ghana Midwives Association (GMA)

GMA empowers midwives through advocacy, training, and community based maternal health initiatives to reduce maternal mortality in Ghana.

== Gender and Social Inclusive Unit ==
The Gender and Social Inclusion Unit serves as the focal point for advancing equity and inclusion within Ghana's health system. They champion evidence-based approaches to ensure thar health services are accessible, inclusiv and responsive to the unique needs of all Ghananians regardless of gender, age, disability, socio-economic status, or geographic location.

Operating within the framework of Ghana's National Health Policy and aline with the Sustainable Development Goals, their mandate encompasses systematic integration of gender and social inclusion principles across all health interventions, from policy development to frontline service delivery.

Mission and Vision

Their mission and vision is to eliminate health disparities and ensure that Ghana's commitment to UHC reaches every citizen, particularly the most vulnerable and marginalise populations, through systematic gender main streaming and evidence-based social inclusion strategies.

Functions

- Develop Policies and Tools
- Coordinate Gender Activities
- Promote Equal Opportunities
- Strengthen Data Systems
- Advocate for Reforms
- Train and Build Capacity
- Engage Communities
- Collaborate

== Disability Inclusive-Health Unit ==
Persons with disabilities (PWDs) make up a significant portion of the population and experience higher health risk, worse health outcomes, and multiple barriers when accessing health services. In response, Ghana has made important policy and institutional commitment, including constitutional protection, with Person with Disabilities Act (Act 715), and sector-Wide effort led by the Ghana Health Services (GHS) to incoorperate disability inclusion into health system strengthening. These initiatives aligns with global framework such as the WHO Global Report on Health Equity for Person with Disabilities and the United Nations Convention on the Right of Persons with Disabilities (UNCRPD) which Ghana has ratified.

Mission

To strengthen Disability-inclusive health service delivery in Ghana by embedding inclusive policies, building health workforce capacity, improving accessible infactrature information systems, promoting meaningful participation of Persons with Disabilities, and ensuring accountability across all levels of health system.

Vision

A health system in Ghana where all Persons with Disabilities have equitable access to quality, accessible, and responsive health services without discrimination.

== Awards and achievements ==
- The Ghana Health Service (GHS) won 3 awards at the 2nd edition of the Africa Public Sector Conference and Awards (APSCA) event held in Accra. Leaders at the two-day event engaged in the public and private sectors from across Africa met to discuss key issues pertaining to public interest, share best practices, experiences and provide opportunities to build partnerships as well as to celebrate outstanding achievements in the African public sector and to lift the veil on exceptional public servants who have made Africa proud. Among the awards won are the following:
  - Outstanding Contribution to Public Service (Health Service)
  - Public Sector Agency of the Year Award
  - Most Innovative Public Sector Project of the Year (Drone Project).
  - To date, disability inclusion capacity-building within the Ghana Health Service has been initiated through the combination of in-person and digital training approaches.
