= Ghana AIDS Commission =

Government organization in Accra, Ghana

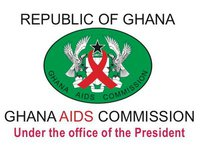

Agency overview
- Formed: 2016; 10 years ago
- Jurisdiction: Government of Ghana

The Ghana AIDS Commission is a supra-ministerial and multi-sectorial body in Ghana. It was established by Act 2016, Act 938 of the Parliament of Ghana. It consists of 47 members including the President and the Vice President, 15 Ministers of State and two members of the Parliament.

== Mission ==
The Ghana AIDS Commission aims to establish policies on the HIV and AIDS epidemic. It also directs activities in response to HIV and AIDS in Ghana.

Ghana AIDS Commi

=== Core Values ===
Ghana AIDS Commission states its core values are "Integrity, accountability, inclusivity, evidence-based decision making, and respect for human rights"

=== Divisions ===
Administrations

Tecnical Services

Policy And Planning Divison

Reseach, Monitoring, And Evaluation Division

Finance Division

Internal Audit Division

Corperate Affairs

Legal Unit

Regional Officers

=== GAC Directors ===
Mr. Isaac Kwao, Director of Reseach, Monitoring, And Evaluation Division

Mr. Siddique Adbul Moomen, Director of Finance and Administration

Mr. John Eliasu Mahama, Acting Director of Public Policy

Josephine Oppong-Adusah, Executive Assistant

=== Interventions ===
In 2024, the Ghana AIDS Commission distributed 35,600 condoms in the Upper West Region as part of its efforts to prevent the spread of HIV. The initiative aligns with Ghana's national strategy to combat HIV/AIDS and promote sexual health awareness in the region.

== HIV in Ghana ==
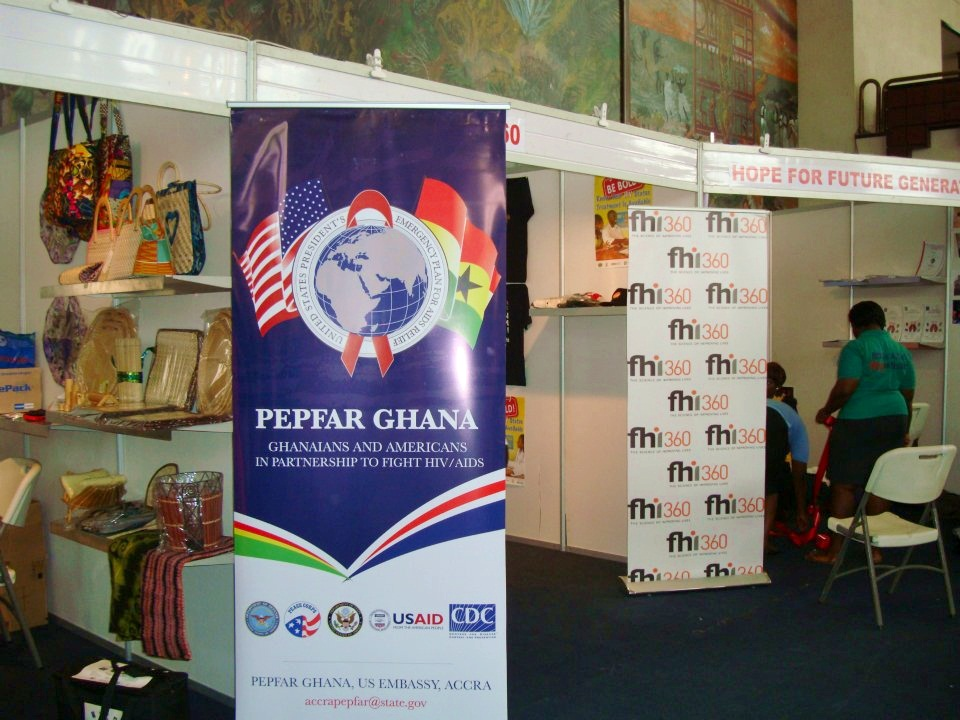
HIV Fair 2012 Accra US Banner

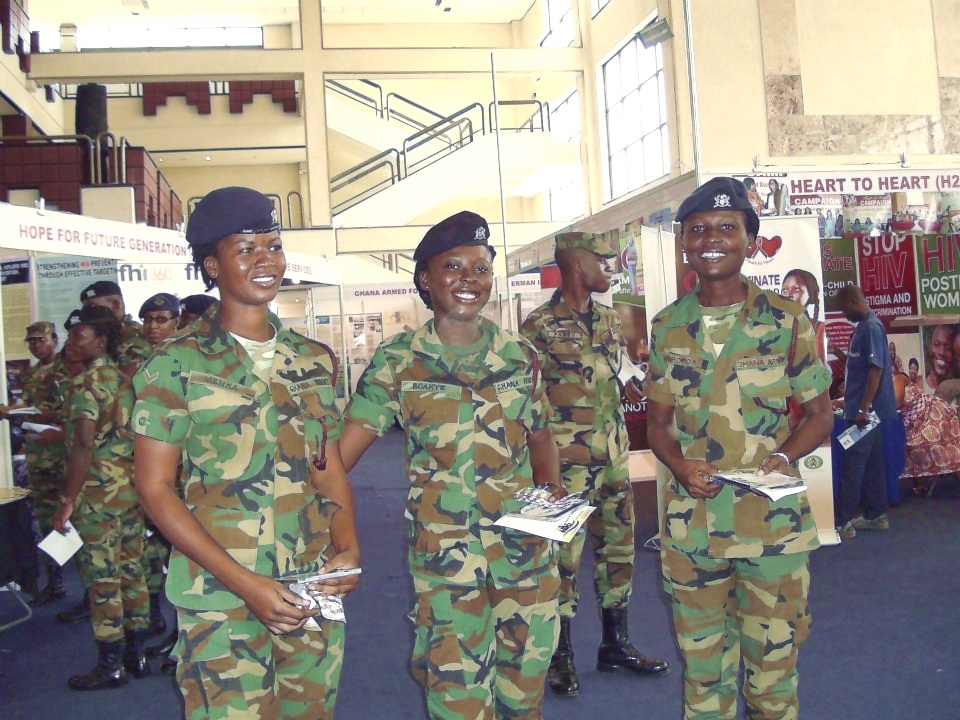
HIV Fair 2012 Accra GhaSold

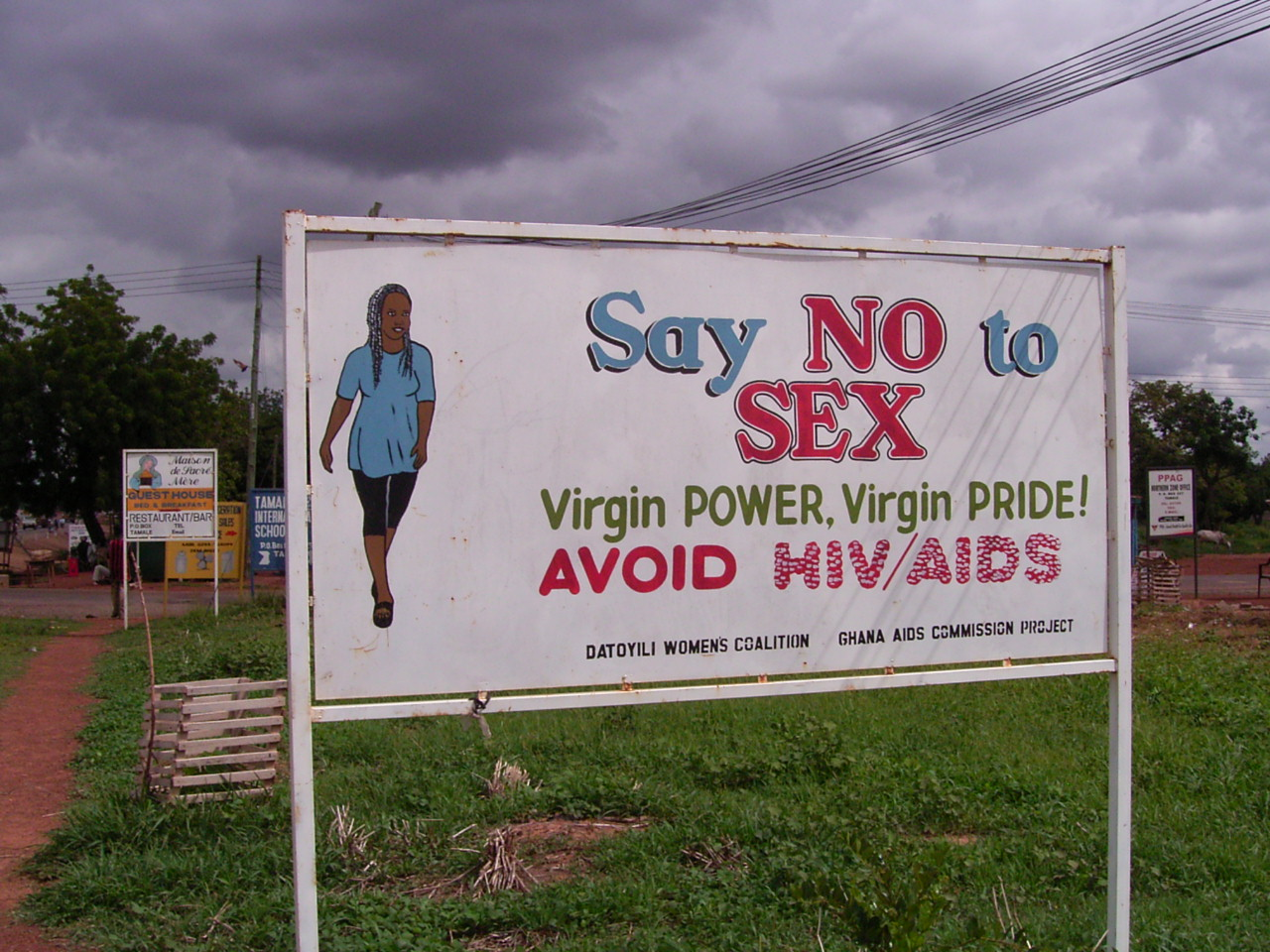
No Sex Signage in Ghana

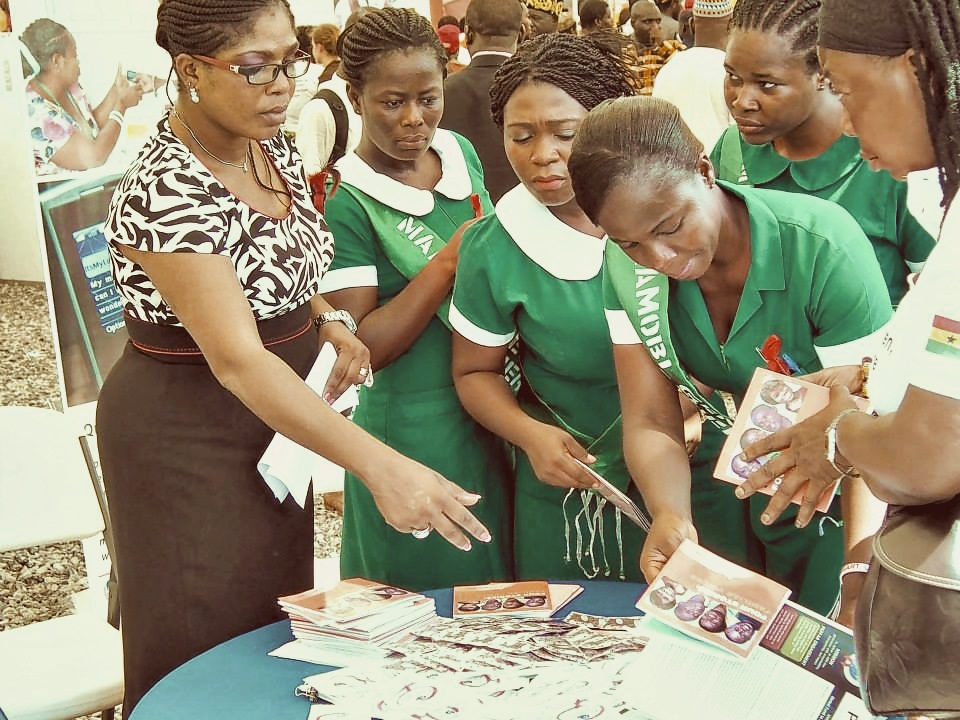
World AIDS Day Maamobi Polyclinic Accra
