= Neighbourhoods of Accra =

List of neighbourhoods within the city of Accra

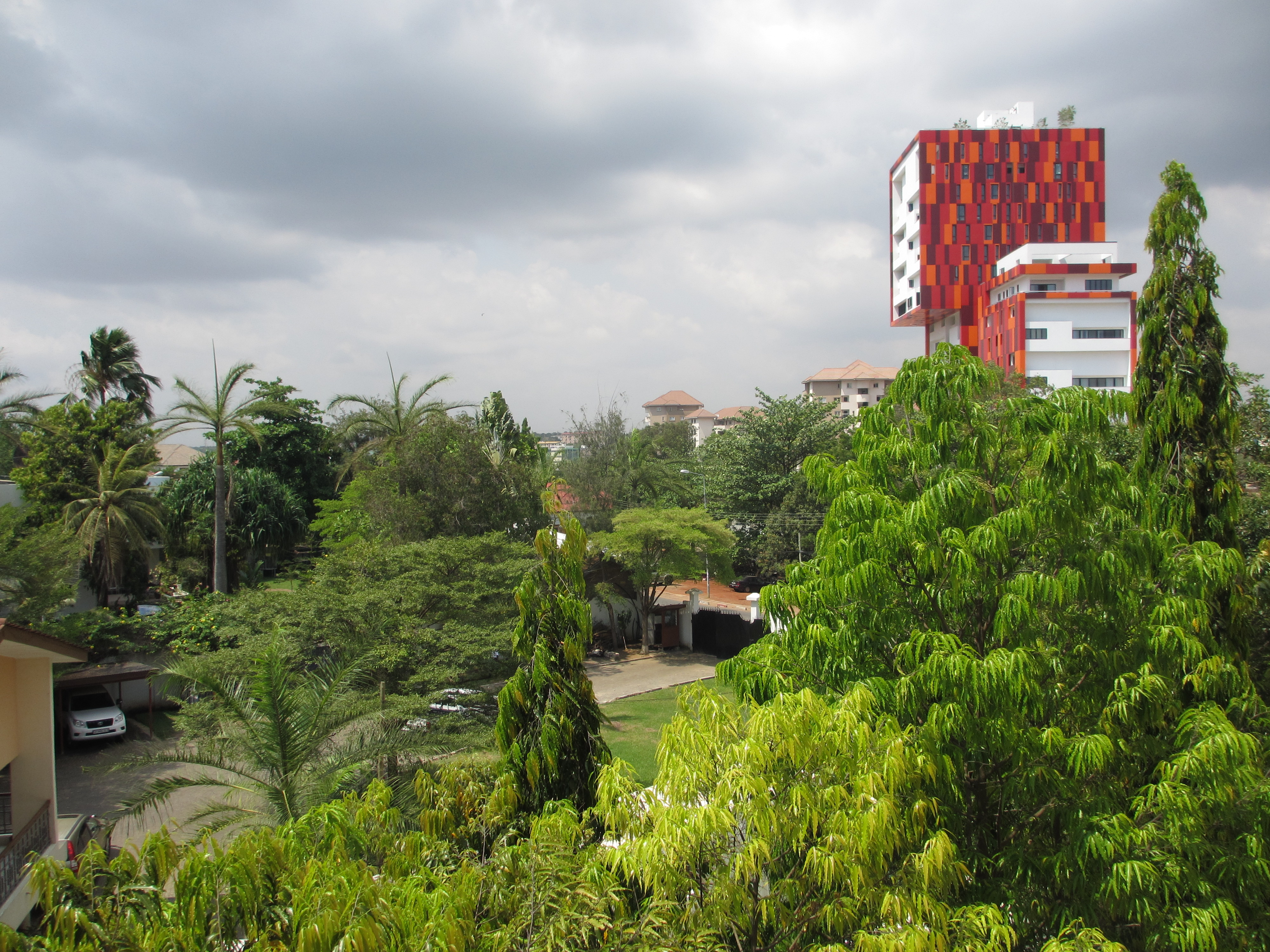
View of a neighbourhood in Accra with the Villagio Vista visible on the right.

The city of Accra, capital of Ghana, is officially divided into five geographical regions: North, West, East, Central and south - and eleven sub-metropolitan areas: Osu Klottey, Ablekuma North, Ablekuma South, Ayawaso Central, Ayawaso East, Ayawaso North, Ayawaso West, La, Okaikoi North, Okaikoi South, Abossey Okai, and Ashiedu Keteke. The word "neighbourhood" can take on various official and unofficial meanings. There are, however, 50 official neighbourhoods (i.e. planned and unplanned anchor neighbourhoods) within the city limits of Accra.

"Neighbourhoods" exist on both large and small scales. Osu, Jamestown and Usshertown, established during the colonial era, have well-defined boundaries by virtue of their siting around the respective forts of Christiansborg, James Fort, and Ussher Fort. The unplanned nature of the city has resulted in the development of slums and much smaller communities within officially recognised neighbourhoods with a well-defined centre but poorly identified extremities.

== Overview ==
Accra's expansion has influenced the naming of certain neighbourhoods, such as the Airport Residential Area, North Ridge, East Ridge, West Ridge, West Legon/Westlands, East Legon, and Korle Gonno.

=== Accra Central ===
Downtown Accra is the site of the government ministries, and the districts of Victoriaborg, West Ridge, and East Ridge.

Surrounding downtown are the neighbourhoods of the Adabraka, Asylum Down, Jamestown, Swalaba, North Ridge, Tudu and Christiansborg/Osu. Osu-RE to be precise is arguably the liveliest part of Accra and the most preferred hang-out spot for tourists visiting the city.

=== Accra North ===
North of downtown, the neighbourhood of Airport Residential Area, so named because of its proximity to the Accra International Airport, is one of the wealthiest neighbourhoods in Accra. East Legon and West Legon/Westlands are also wealthy neighbourhoods inhabited by wealthy Ghanaians, academics, government officials, and ex-patriates. Other neighbourhoods located in the expansive northern section of Accra are Roman Ridge, Kanda, Dzorwulu, East Legon, Kaneshie, North Kaneshie, Accra New Town, Nima, Kokomlemle, Tesano, Maamobi, Alajo, Christian Village, Apenkwa, Darkuman, Awoshie, Avenor, Kwashieman, Achimota, Bubiashie, Kotobabi, Abelemkpe, Bawaleshie, and Abeka.

=== Accra West ===
West of downtown are the neighbourhoods of Korle Gonno, Lartebiokorshie, Abossey Okai, Mataheko, Mpoase, Chorkor, Dansoman, Mamprobi, and Odorkor. Dansoman is Accra's largest neighbourhood and predominantly a working-class community, considered to be Accra's most diverse. However, it is stated emphatically and well documented that Mamprobi is not part of Dansoman and still remains a controversial topic Korle Gonno borders Korle-Bu Hospital, which doubles as the teaching hospital of the University of Ghana.

=== Accra East ===
East of downtown are the neighbourhoods of Cantonments (the site of the U.S. Embassy in Ghana), Labadi, La, Burma Camp, and Airport Hills.

== Neighbourhood areas ==
Following the years of Accra's prosperity after World War II, and Kwame Nkrumah's emphasis on the development of Accra and its immediate environs after independence, Accra was the favoured destination for job-seeking migrants. This phenomenon brought about the development of unplanned communities on the periphery of the limits of Accra at the time. Over the years, these suburban areas were absorbed into the urban area of Accra and created a dichotomy between planned and unplanned settlements within the city.

=== Planned neighbourhoods ===
Currently, most of Accra's 22 planned neighbourhoods were developed in the colonial era and are inhabited by rich Ghanaians and expatriates.

1. Victoriaborg
2. East Ridge
3. West Ridge
4. North Ridge
5. Adabraka

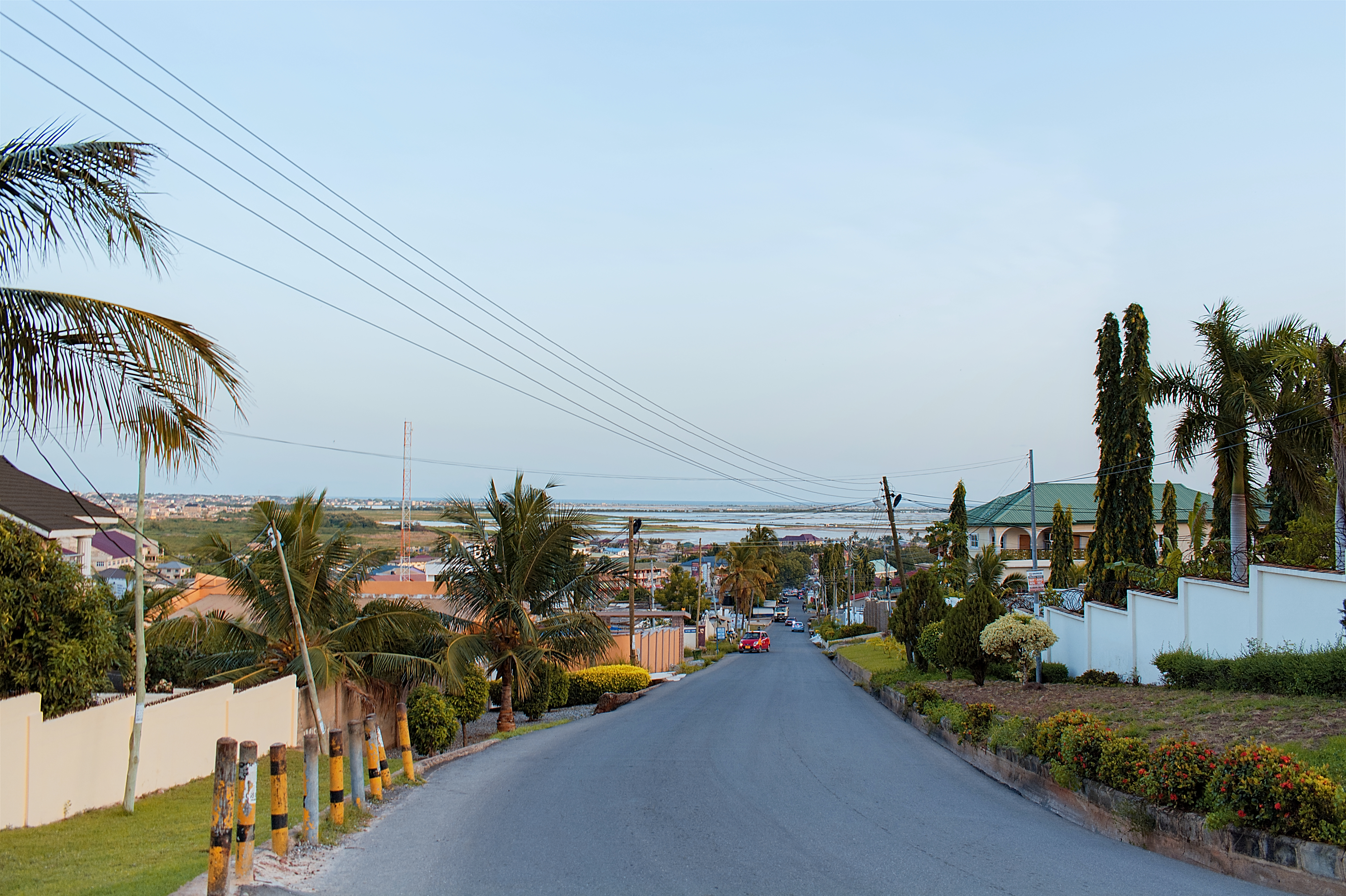
McCarthy Hill

1. Asylum Down
2. McCarthy Hill
3. Airport Hills
4. Airport Residential Area
5. Roman Ridge
6. Kanda
7. Dzorwulu
8. East Legon
9. Kaneshie
10. Kokomlemle
11. Tesano
12. West Legon/Westlands
13. Abelemkpe
14. Cantonments
15. Labone
16. Burma Camp (formerly Giffard Camp)
17. Chorkor
18. Mamprobi
19. Korle Bu
20. Korle Gonno
21. Lartebiokorshie
22. Mataheko
23. Dansoman
24. Adenta

=== Unplanned neighbourhoods ===
Given the disproportionate rate of expansion of the city and the provision of basic infrastructure and services, unplanned neighbourhoods are characterised by poor road networks, poor drainage systems, and insufficient water and electricity services. Although not mutually exclusive, these unplanned settlements can be further distinguished from slums, where a slum is defined as a run-down area of a city characterised by substandard housing and squalor and lacking in tenure security. For purposes of this article, a slum will further be categorised as an area of severely low income where working migrants living in makeshift accommodations are the majority.

1. Agbogbloshie
2. Nima
3. Kpehe
4. Awoshie
5. Alajo
6. Avenor
7. Kotobabi
8. Bawaleshie
9. Christian Village
10. Pig Farm
11. Accra New Town
12. Maamobi
13. Abeka
14. Lapaz
15. Darkuman
16. Achimota
17. Teshie
18. Odorkor
19. Nii Boi Town
20. Akweteyman
21. Mantseman
22. Abossey Okai
23. Apenkwa
24. Bubiashie
25. Mpoase

=== Slums ===
1. Agbogbloshie
2. Sabon Zongo
3. Old Fadama (Sodom and Gomorrah)
4. Lavender Hill (Accra)
5. Abuja
6. Chemuna
7. Gbegbeyise
8. Chorkor

== List of communities within neighbourhoods ==
Within some of the neighbourhoods in Accra are smaller communities listed below. Taking into account the slums, communities, planned and unplanned neighbourhoods, unofficially there are approximately 120 neighbourhoods within the city limits of Accra.

- Victoriaborg
1. Ministries
2. Kinbu
- East Ridge
1. Gold Coast City
- West Ridge
1. Ambassadorial Enclave
- Usshertown
1. Makola
2. High Street
3. Rawlings Park
- Osu
1. Ringway Estates
2. Kuku Hill
3. Osu-Ako Adjei
4. Osu-Alata/Ashante
5. Osu-RE
6. Osu Kinkawe
- Cantonments
1. El-Wak
2. East Cantonments
- Airport Residential Area
1. Airport City
2. HIPC Junction
3. Spintex
- Adabraka
1. Circle
2. Odawna
- Dansoman
1. Russia
2. Sahara
3. Sukura
4. Shiabu
5. Dansoman Estates
6. Santa Maria
7. Old Dansoman
8. Dansoman Amanhoma
9. SSNIT Flats
10. Akokorfoto
11. Tweneboa
12. Sakaman
- Kaneshie
1. Awudome
2. First Light
3. North Kaneshie
4. Kwashieman
- West Legon/Westlands
1. Kisseman
2. Christian Village
3. Haatso
- Abelemkpe
1. Old Abelemkpe
2. New Abelemkpe/Abelemkpe Forest
- Airport Residential Area
1. Legion Village
2. East Airport
3. Villagio
4. Manet
- Usshertown
1. Okaishie
2. Tudu
- East Legon
1. Shiashie
2. Bawaleshie
3. South Shiashie
4. Okplongo
5. Adjiriganor
6. Nmai Djorn
- Awoshie
1. Odorgornor
2. Regimanuel Estates
- Lartebiokorshie
1. Sabon Zango
2. Zoti Area
- Odorkor
1. North Odorkor
2. South Odorkor
3. Official Town
- Labadi
1. South Labadi
2. Labadi-Aborm
- Tesano
1. South Tesano
- Teshie Nungua
- Mamprobi
1. Mamobi
2. Nima
3. New Mamprobi
- Kanda 441
1. Kanda Estates
2. "37"
