= East Ridge (disambiguation) =

East Ridge may refer to:

- East Ridge, Tennessee, U.S.
- East Ridge, Accra, Ghana
- East Ridge High School (disambiguation), the name of several schools

== See also ==
- Eastridge Mall (disambiguation)
- West Ridge (disambiguation)
