= East Ridge, Accra =

Neighbourhood of Accra, Ghana

East Ridge
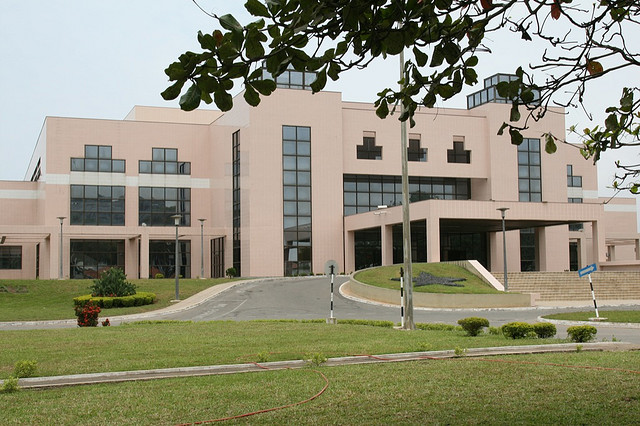
- Accra International Conference Centre
- Interactive map of East Ridge
- 5.5615°N 0.1879°W
- Location: Roughly: W: Independence Avenue; SW: Kinbu Gardens; S: Sir Charles Quist Street; N: Tenth Road; E: Sir Charles Quist Street

Site notes
- Governing body: Accra Metropolitan Assembly

East Ridge is a neighbourhood of Accra, Ghana, bounded to the south and East by Sir Charles Quist Street. Independence Avenue serves as the district's western boundary. Castle Road separates East Ridge from the northern neighbourhood of Osu.

Originally planned as an extension to the historic Victoriaborg neighbourhood, East Ridge is being transformed into a commercial and leisure district of Accra, with the siting of the National Theatre and Efua Sutherland Children's Park in the neighbourhood.

East Ridge also hosts an entire area of government offices known as the "Ministries". With recent plans to redevelop the racecourse into a mixed-used commercial area anchored by the new Kempinski Gold Coast City hotel, provision has been made to relocate ministries to be affected by the development.

The area of East Ridge, North Ridge, and West Ridge is collectively referred to as "The Ridge". This area is populated by several major embassies, including those of Germany and the United Kingdom. In addition, several of Accra's upmarket hotels, and several Ghanaian administrative offices are located in this neighbourhood.

== Landmarks/Places of Interest ==
- Efua Sutherland Children's Park
- National Theatre
- Ohene Djan Stadium
- Accra International Conference Centre
- State House
- Parliament House
- College of Surgeons and Physicians
- Kofi Annan Centre of Excellence
