= Eric Yao =

Ghanaian former government executive

Eric Yao is a Ghanaian former government executive. He was the Managing Director of Ghana Post, the national postal service, until February 2017 when he was removed following accusations by Ghana Post employees of embezzlement and unethical behavior.

== Career ==
Yao was appointed as Managing Director of Ghana Post in August 2015. During his tenure the service continued to suffer a steep fall in stamp revenue and lost money, falling short of the GH¢2 million needed every month in 2016 to meet the payroll.

To find revenue growth outside of traditional postal service, he explored a number of ventures with private enterprises. This included a plan announced in 2016 to establish a microfinance company that was to mature into a commercial bank. Other plans included entering into the business segments of haulage and logistics and real estate business. Yao was especially keen to develop businesses ICT and e-commerce.

Part of the turnaround strategy under Yao was to leverage the property owned by the service in the country's main cities to gain additional revenue through side lines. In Accra and Kumasi the Ghana Post entered into partnerships with private companies to start new business ventures. This meant clearing lands owned by Ghana Post by evicting squatters. In an October 2015 media tour, Yao showed the media efforts to clear lands owned by Ghana Post in Bubuashie of "mechanical shops, cattle farms, football parks, churches, and other unauthorised activities and structures" through a demolition exercise.

During his last year as Managing Directory, Yao faced a lack of public confidence in the quality of the service delivered by Ghana Post and allegations that service had ceased. Yao countered these criticisms in an August 2016 public event aimed at promoting the launch of "Peaceful Elections" stamps ahead of the general election in 2016, stating, "Ghana Post is very much alive contrary to some perceptions out there that we no longer exist."
