= Akweteyman =

Coordinates: 5°37′N 0°15′W

Airport Residential Area
- Town
- Location within Ghana
- Country: Ghana
- Region: Greater Accra Region
- District: Accra Metropolitan
- Time zone: GMT
  - Summer (DST): GMT

Akweteyman is a town in the Okaikwei North Municipal District in the Greater Accra Region of Ghana.

Among the historical and cultural attractions in the area of Akweteyman are the National Museum of Ghana, the Kwame Nkrumah Memorial Park and Mausoleum, the W.E.B. De Bois Memorial Centre for Pan African Culture, the Accre Arts Centre, the National Theatre of Ghana, and the Jamestown Light House. These institutions provide insight into the traditional culture of Ghana, documentation of the slave trade and Ghana's past as a British colony, and encouragement for further educational and technological development. Kwame Nkkrumah was the first president of Ghana and a leading pan-Africanist. Born in the United States in 1868, sociologist and historian Dr. W.E.B Du Bois was a pioneer civil rights activist and pan-Africanist who died in Accra, Ghana in 1963.

Sports and recreation sites in the area of Akweteyman include the tropical urban Achimota Forest, the Accra Sports Stadium, the Bukom Boxing Arena, the Accra Polo Club, the Efua Sutherland Children's Park, the Densu Delta Ramsar Site, and the La Pleasure Beach.

Three five-star hotels (the Accra Mariott Hotel, the Mendiata Hotel, and the Accra City Hotel) and a number of restaurants serve guests who come to the international Ghana Trade Fair Centre.
