= Hinduism in Ghana =

Hindus in Ghana
Total population
- 30,000 (2021)▲; 0.1% of total population

Regions with significant populations
- Mainly urban areas: Accra, Kumasi

Religions
- Hinduism

Related ethnic groups
- Indians in Ghana and Hindus

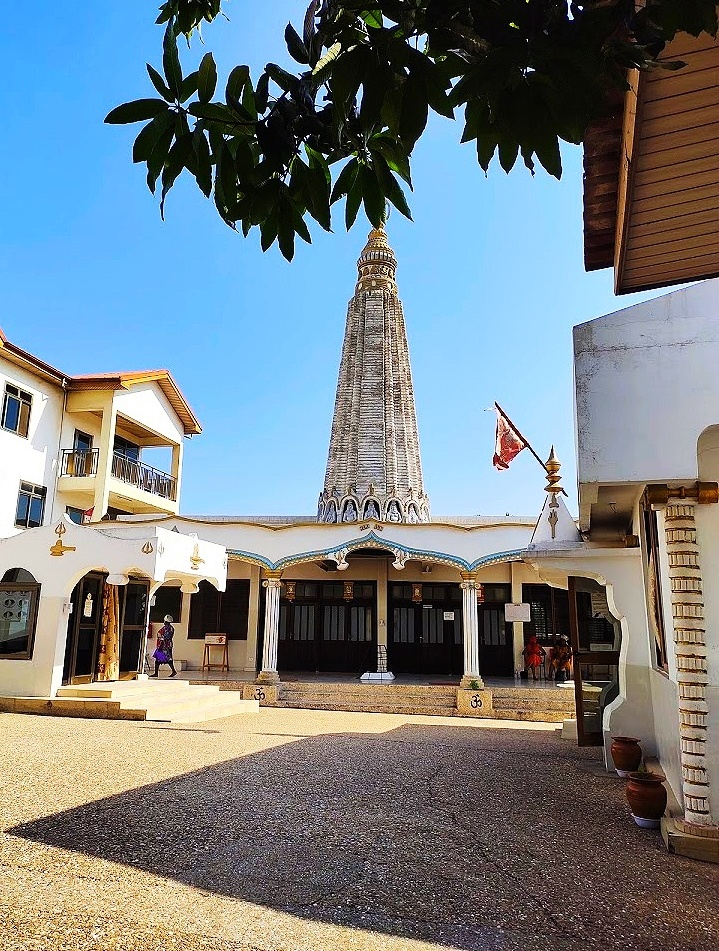
African Hindu Monastery

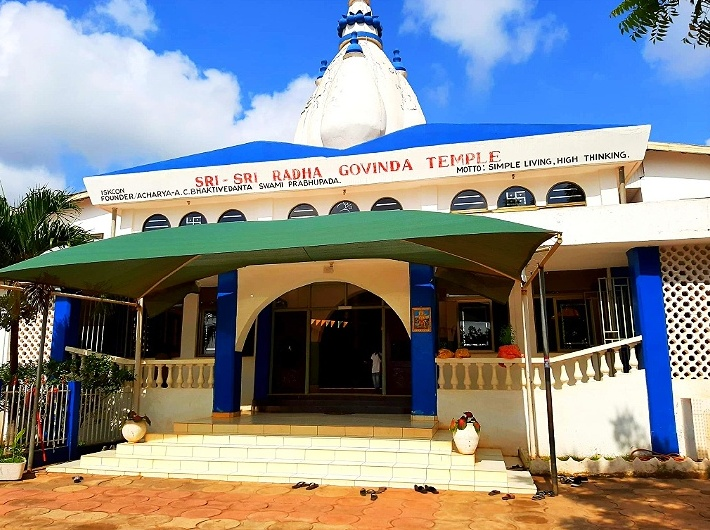
Sri Sri Radha Govinda Temple or ISKCON temple in Accra

Hinduism in Ghana is a minority religion that has grown steadily since the mid-20th century. Hinduism was first introduced by Sindhi settlers who migrated to the Gold Coast (modern-day Ghana) after the Partition of India in 1947. These early settlers established private shrines and small community temples, largely centered on the Sindhi mercantile community.

The spread of Hinduism beyond the Indian diaspora in Ghana began in the 1970s with the foundation of the Hindu Monastery of Africa (HMA), led by Swami Ghanananda Saraswati, a Ghanaian who converted to Hinduism and trained in India. Ghanananda’s monastery became a central institution for indigenous African converts and promoted a distinctly Ghanaian expression of Shaivism, blending Vedic teachings with local cultural practices. Around the same period, the International Society for Krishna Consciousness (ISKCON) established a presence in Ghana, promoting Vaishnavism through public chanting, vegetarian food distribution, and temple worship. Hinduism is widely regarded by scholars as one of the fastest-growing minority religions in Ghana, largely due to conversion among ethnic Akan and other indigenous groups.

== Population ==
In 2009, there were approximately 12,500 Hindus in Ghana, making up about 0.05% of the national population. The Hindu population is divided into two main groups: the Indian diaspora, primarily Sindhi merchants and their descendants, and the indigenous Ghanaians.

The Hindu Monastery of Africa has been a central institution for local Ghanaian converts since its founding in 1975. Under the leadership of Ghanananda, the monastery established five temples across southern Ghana, serving as both religious and community centers. While many members of the Indian community participate in these temples, they also maintain separate places of worship, especially within the Sindhi community.

ISKCON also has a growing presence in Ghana through its temple in Medie and numerous smaller congregations, and its devotees are active in public harinam chanting and free vegetarian meal programs. The disciples of Sathya Sai Baba form another prominent group within Ghana’s Hindu community.

By 2021, unofficial estimates suggested that the Hindu population had increased to around 30,000, or roughly 0.1% of the national population.

== Beliefs and practices of Ghanaian Hindus ==
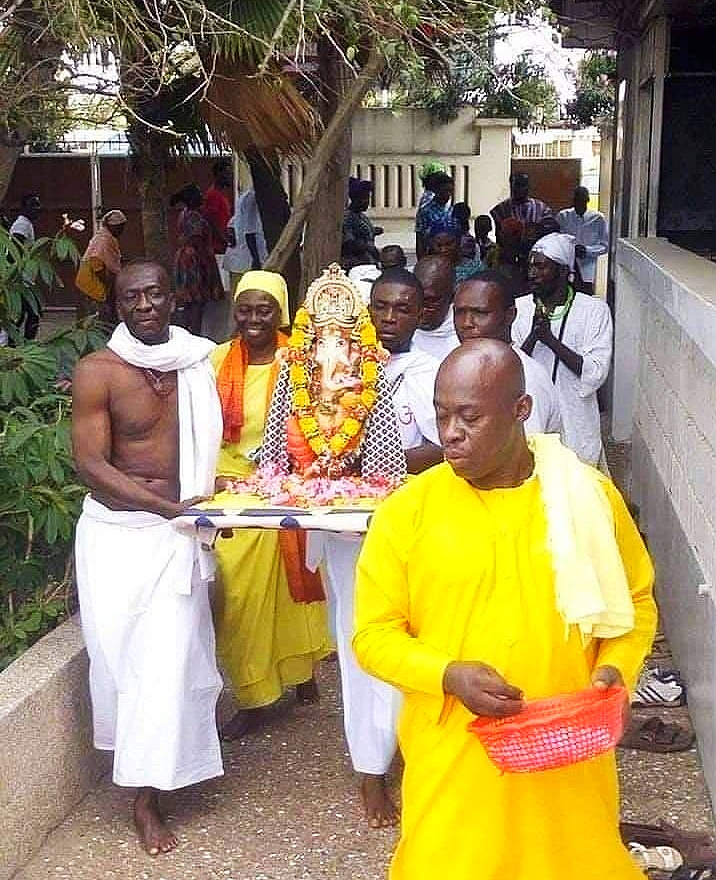
Hindus in Ghana celebrating Ganesh Chaturti

Aside from the basic beliefs of reincarnation and Karma that are attributed to a vast majority of Hindus, Ghanaian followers of Hindu tradition have a few specific beliefs and practices that are primarily emphasized. First and foremost, the primary indication that a person in Ghana is a believer of the Hindu faith is that he or she has made the decision to not include meat in their diet. This is considered a primary indicator because other Hindu practices such as prohibition from illicit sex and abstinence from alcohol are also commonly demanded by other Ghanaian religions, while the avoidance of meat is rather unusual. Ghanaian Hindus tend to avoid meat consumption due to the belief that every life is sacred and manifestation of supreme God. Eating consciously when other sources of food are available in order not to harm anyone. Stemming from this idea, the second defining belief of Hindus in Ghana is the notion that cows are sacred beings that must not be harmed, but rather revered. This belief comes from the understanding that when the Hindu deity Krishna was incarnated on Earth, he came as a cowherd. Also, the Vedic Hindu Goddess Aditi is portrayed as a cow whose milk is identified with the invigorating drink "soma" which is believed to nourish creation. This Ghanaian Hindu belief is also a defining one, as not only do a majority of Ghanaians eat cow's milk daily, but the remaining resources from the cow's body are also commonly used for other practical tasks in traditional Ghanaian lifestyles.

== Hindu festivals ==
Big Hindu festivals such as Navaratri, Dipawali and Ramnavami are celebrated by Ghanaian Hindus.

== Hindu denominations ==
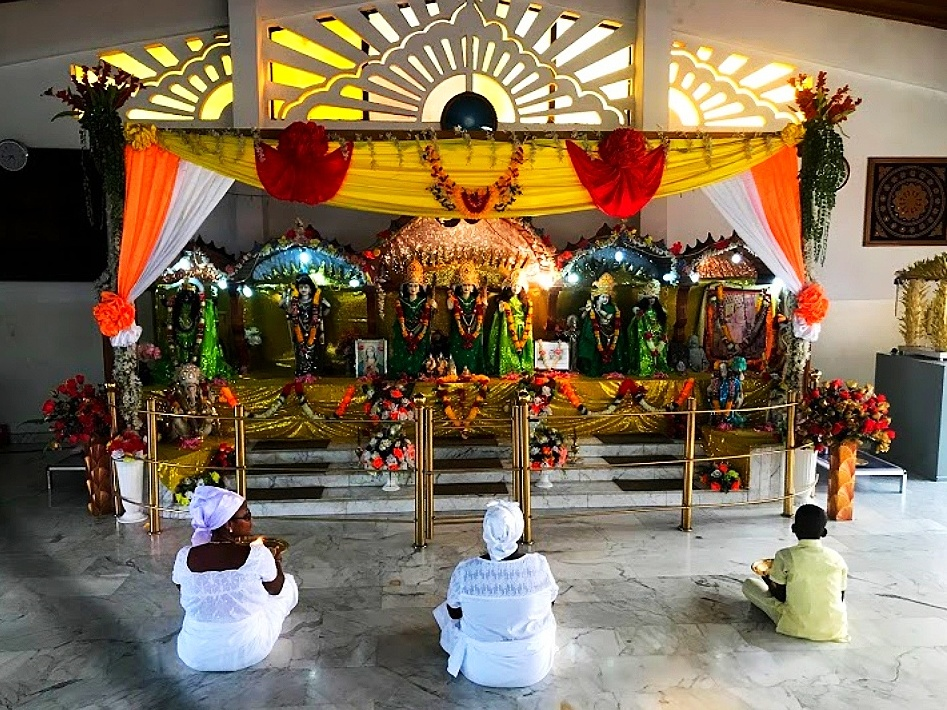
Inside the African Hindu Monastery

Hindus in Ghana are followers of two major Hindu denominations: Shaivism by the Hindu Monastery of Africa and Vaishnavism by the Hare Krishnas(ISKCON).

The Hare Krishnas are the local branch of the well-known worldwide Hindu religious movement founded in 1966 by A. C. Bhaktivedanta Swami Prabhupada. The center for their activities in Ghana is the Sri Radha Govinda Temple in the town of Medie outside Accra, but there are numerous small groups of devotees around the country as reflected in the community’s multi-ethnic composition. In contrast, Akans make up most of the membership of the Hindu Monastery, an indigenous temple located in the Odorkor neighborhood of Accra. This temple was built in 1975 by the Swami Ghanananda

Other Hindu groups include Arya Samaj of Ghana, The Sri Sathya sai Baba movement, The Akkanum Nama Shivaya Healing Church etc.

== Prominent Ghanaian Hindus ==
- Swami Ghanananda, Ghanaian swami
- Victoria Lakshmi Hamah, politician
