= Maamobi market =

The Maamobi market is a major commercial market in Maamobi in the Greater Accra Region of Ghana.
