= Mövenpick Ambassador Hotel Accra =

Hotel in Accra, Ghana

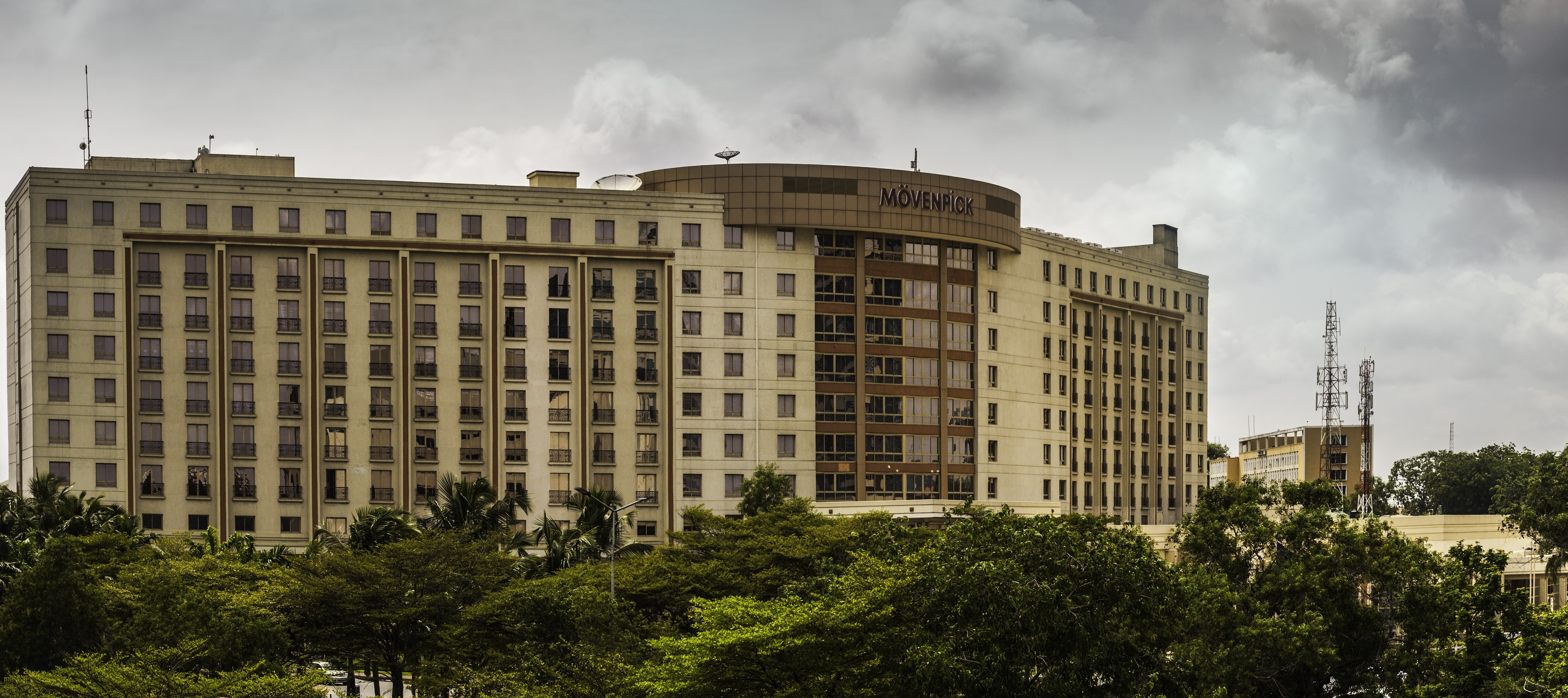
- Interactive map of the Mövenpick Ambassador Hotel Accra area

General information
- Location: Independence Avenue Ridge, Ghana
- Construction started: 2007

The Mövenpick Ambassador Hotel Accra is a five-star luxury hotel located in Accra, the capital of Ghana, set in West Ridge, seven kilometres (4.3 mi) from Accra International Airport.

== History ==
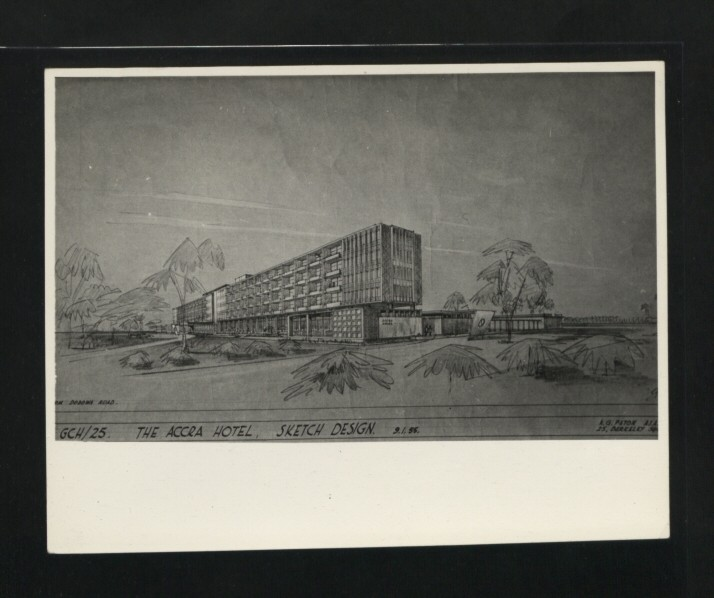
Architectural rendering of the original Ambassador Hotel

The first Ambassador Hotel was established in 1957, as a gift by the United Kingdom to the Ghanaian government, on the attainment of independence. The original 150-room, 4-story structure was demolished in 2006, for redevelopment of the site.

The modern, 250-room hotel was built at a cost of $100 million by Kingdom Holding Company, the investment arm of Saudi Prince Prince Al Waleed bin Talal Al Saud. It opened in November 2011, managed by Mövenpick Hotels & Resorts, also owned by Kingdom Holding Company. Kingdom sold the hotel to Mauritius-based Quantum Global Investments Africa Management Ltd. in 2017 for $100 million.

== Location and description ==
The Mövenpick Ambassador Hotel Accra is located within the city's Central Business District a few kilometres away from Accra International Airport, Accra. The hotel is located close to the Accra Financial Centre, World Trade Centre, International Conference Centre and government ministries. The hotel also has the largest swimming-pool in Accra and an emporium attached to it, with shops and other businesses.
