= Religion in Togo =

Religion in Togo (2022 census)
1. Christianity (49.2%)
2. Islam (18.6%)
3. Traditional (17.0%)
4. No religion (9.40%)
5. Other (2.90%)
6. Not stated/Unknown (2.90%)

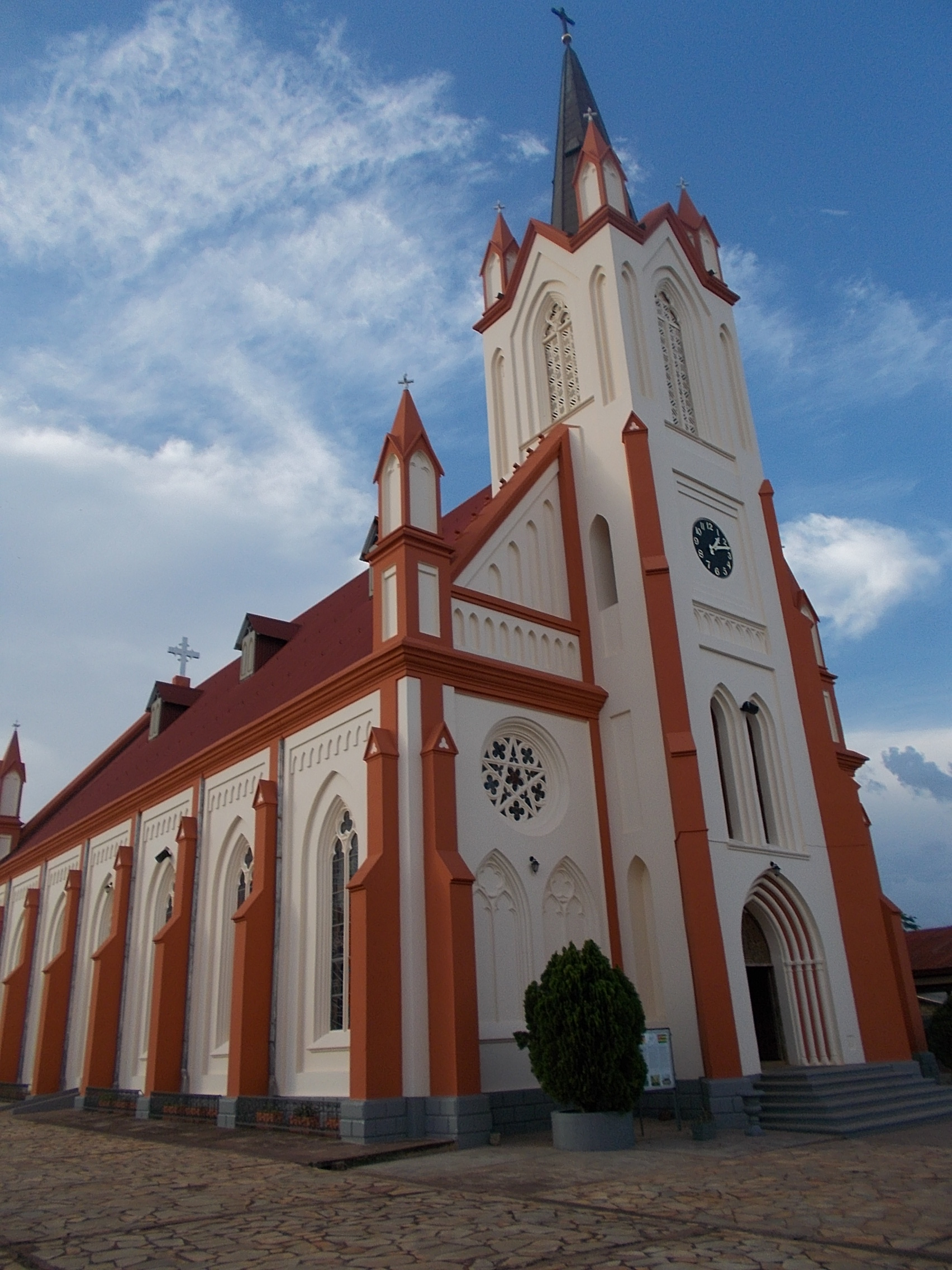
Holy Ghost Cathedral in Kpalimé.

Religion in Togo is diverse, with the nation ranking as the seventh most religiously diverse in the world. Christianity is the largest religion practised by approximately half of the population, while adherents of Islam and traditional religions also represent major religious groups in the country.

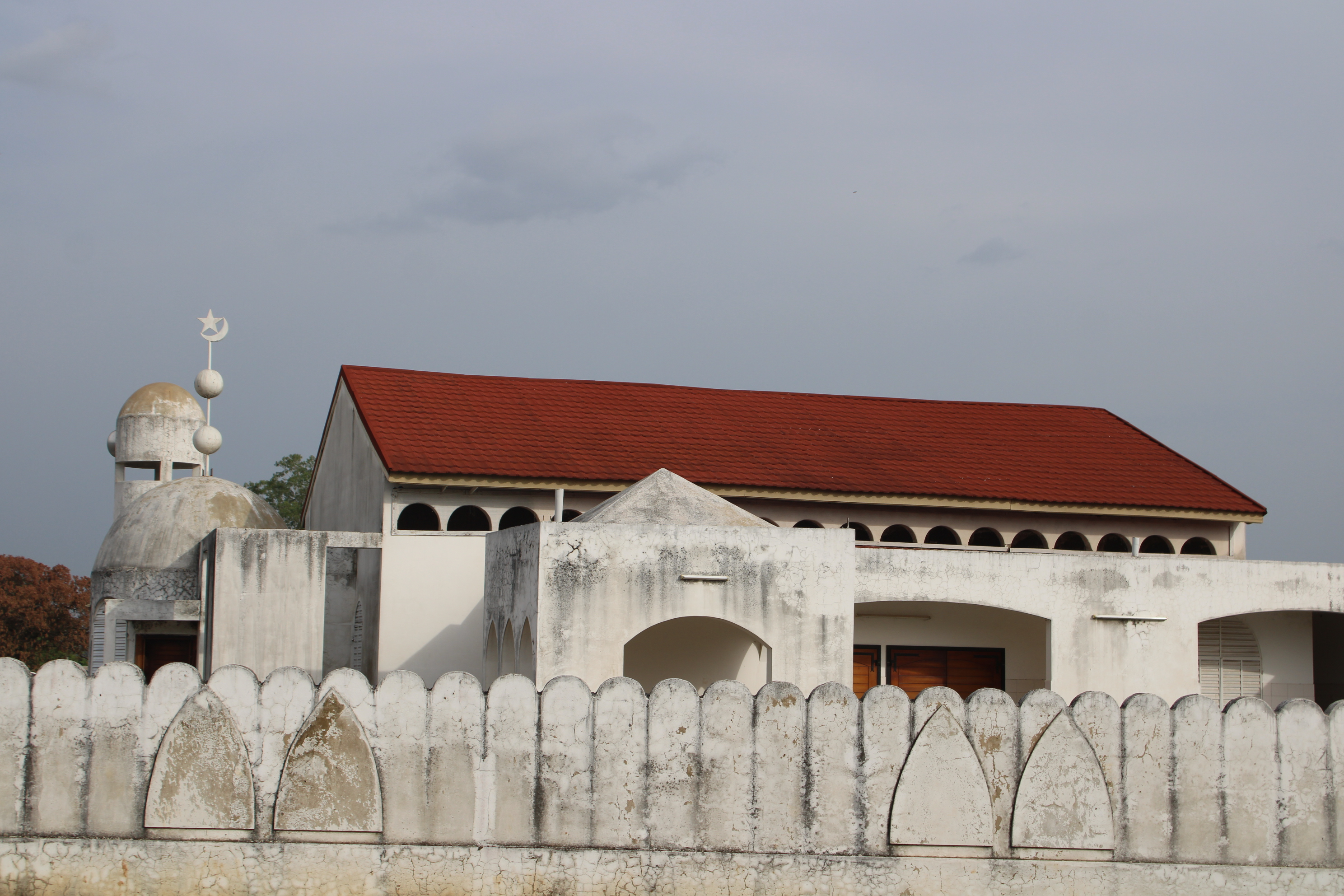
Mosque in Blitta

A significant number of Christians and Muslims in Togo also incorporate elements of folk religion into their practice. Togo is a secular state and the nation's constitution provides freedom of religion and worship. The Christian population primarily comprises Catholics and various Protestant denominations.

== Statistics ==
The 2022 general population and housing census found 49.2% of the Togolese population identified as Christian, 18.6% as Muslim, 17.0% as practitioners of traditional faiths, 9.4% with no religion, and 2.9% with other religions.

Between the 2010 and 2022 censuses, the share of Muslims increased from 16.1% to 18.6% of the total population, and the proportion of Togolese Christians grew from 48.6% to 49.2%. Conversely, the percentage of those identifying with traditional religions declined sharply from 27.7% to 17.0% of the population in the same time period.

Religion	2022 Census	
Religion	#	%
Christianity	3,965,800	49.2
—Catholicism	1,688,420	21.0
—Protestantism	1,680,523	20.8
—Jehovah's Witnesses	51,087	0.6
—Other Christian	545,770	6.8
Islam	1,499,867	18.6
Traditional faiths	1,367,266	17.0
Other	231,073	2.9
No religion	759,447	9.4
Not stated	187,619	2.3
Unknown	47,100	0.6
Total	8,058,172	100

== Overview ==
The 2014 General Population and Housing Census noted that 25% of the population was Catholic, making it the primary branch of Christianity in Togo, while other denominations included Methodists, Lutherans, Assemblies of God, Seventh-day Adventists, The Church of Jesus Christ of Latter-day Saints (Mormons) and Jehovah's Witnesses. Nichiren Buddhists, followers of the International Society of Krishna Consciousness, Baha’is and Hindus are among other religious groups in the country.

Christians live mainly in the south of the country, while Muslims live predominately in the central and northern regions.

=== Traditional African religions ===
According to the 2022 census, approximately 1.4 million Togolese identified with traditional religions, representing 17% of the total population. Among Christians and Muslims, some practice a form of worship that combines traditional rites and Voodoo beliefs. The Togolese remain very attached to animist practices and their ancestral customs. Among these religions, the most important are the Yoruba religion, whose famous ceremony, the Gelede, is characterized by the expression of feelings through music and songs, and fetishism, which is the worship of fetishes believed to cure the ills caused by witchcraft.

=== Protestantism and the Orange Order ===
The Togolese branch of the Orange Order, governed by the Grand Lodge of Togo, serves as a local chapter of the international Protestant fraternal organization. Its origins trace back to September 1915 with the establishment of its first lodge, LOL 867, "Defenders of Lome," by John Amate Atayi. Atayi, a Togolese local, was first initiated into the order in Lagos, Nigeria, before bringing its principles to his home country. the lodges in Togo, which also include LOL 884, concentrate on positive evangelism, youth development, and community philanthropy. Members interpret the victory of William of Orange not as a political symbol but rather as a testament to civil and religious freedom. This perspective highlights the organization's focus on non-political, charitable works and spiritual growth within the local community.

=== Islam ===
Muslims represent the second largest religious group in Togo, after Christians. Islam was introduced to Togo by Berber groups who built mosques and converted populations, so that by 1900, 4% of the population was Muslim. In the 17th century, the Tchokossi, a Muslim people, settled in the Mango region of Togo, and gradually spread northward. German, and later French, rule was considered very favorable to the development of Islam in the country. The settlers signed agreements with the Muslim Berbers of the region to provide them with gold, weapons and mercenaries. The first mosque in Togo was built in the middle of the 19th century in the village of Didawurê.

In 1997, Togo has become a member country of the Organization of Islamic Cooperation.

The 2022 census recorded approximately 1.5 million Togolese Muslims, accounting for roughly 19% of the total population. The vast majority of Muslims in Togo are Sunni of the Maliki school.

=== Other religions ===
==== Hinduism ====
Hinduism is a recent phenomenon in Togo. This religion was exported to Togo through the Hindu Monastery of Africa based in Accra, Ghana. The religion was introduced by indigenous Africans based in Accra, Ghana, and a branch of the Hindu Monastery of Africa has been established in Lomé. There are around 80,000 or 1% Hindus in Togo in 2022.

==== Baháʼí Faith ====
In 2020, there were around 40,000 followers of Baháʼí Faith in Togo.

==== Cults ====
Cults has enormously grew in Togo since the 1990s with the socio-economic crisis the country is going through. More than two thousand are registered in Lomé, some of which are hiding networks of prostitution, modern slavery, and embezzlement.

== Freedom of religion ==
In 2022, Freedom House rated Togo's religious freedom as 3 out of 4, noting that religious freedom is constitutionally protected and generally respected in practice. Islam, Catholicism and Protestantism are recognised by the state; other groups must register as religious associations to receive similar benefits. The registration process has been subject to long delays with almost 900 applications pending at the beginning of 2021.

== See also ==
- Catholic Church in Togo

== Bibliography ==
- Jean-Paul Savi (2020). Geopolitical Failure and Missionary Failure? German Catholic Missionaries in Togoland (1892-1921). Paris: L’Harmattan.
