= Victoria Lakshmi Hamah =

Ghanaian politician

- Education: University of Ghana Business School
- Alma mater: University of Oxford
- Occupation: Politician
- Political party: National Democratic Congress

Victoria Lakshmi Hamah is a Ghanaian politician under the ticket of National Democratic Congress (NDC) in Ghana. Victoria Hamah is a member of the Hindu Monastery of Africa for over a decade. She is the former Deputy Minister for Communications in Ghana, known for bridging politics, gender advocacy, and leadership, as well as being the founder and president of Progressive Organisation for Women's Advancement (POWA).

== Education ==
She holds a Bachelor of Arts in Political Science with Philosophy and a Master of Arts in Social Policy, both obtained from the University of Legon, Ghana. Hamah also obtained an Executive Certificate from the University of Oxford, Saïd Business School, UK.

In 2026, she earned a Doctor of Philosophy (PhD) in Public Administration and Policy Management from the University of Ghana Business School, Legon, where she completed her dissertation titled “Gender Asymmetry in Ghana's Parliamentary Committees: A Critical Analysis of Women's Representation and Legislative Influence.” Prior to this, she spent two months in the Czech Republic through the Erasmus Exchange Programme at Mendel University in preparation for her PhD research.

== Politics ==
In the 2012 general election, she contested the Ablekuma West constituency parliamentary seat. She served as Deputy Minister of Communications under the John Dramani Mahama administration until Friday, 8 November 2013. During her time in office, she faced what she described as unjust scrutiny, which she alluded to her womanhood and the nature of Ghana’s political landscape.

She currently runs a non profit organization for women - Progressive Organisation for Women's Advancement (POWA) where she sits on the board. Hamah describes herself as a scholar-practitioner who is deeply committed to shaping governance debates and working toward advancing women’s goals in the pursuit of equality.
