= Swami Ghanananda Saraswati =

Swami Ghanananda
- Born: 12 September 1937; Senya Beraku, Central Region, Ghana
- Died: 18 January 2016 (aged 78)
- Occupation(s): Swami; Śishya of Swami Krishnananda

Ghanananda Saraswati (born Kewsi Essel; 12 September 1937 – 18 January 2016), commonly known as Swami Ghanananda, was a prominent swami (sannyasi) of the indigenous Hindu community in Ghana, and the first Hindu swami of African ancestry. He was initiated as a swami by the late Swami Krishnananda of India in 1975, and was head of the Hindu Monastery of Africa in Accra, Ghana.

== Biography ==
=== Early life ===
Swami Ghanananda was born as Kwesi Essel on September 12, 1937, in Senya Beraku, a village in the Central Region of Ghana. His family practiced a native Ghanaian faith, but his parents later converted to Christianity. From a very early age Swami Ghanananda was interested in the mysteries of the universe and read various religious texts.

=== Journey to India ===
After reading some books on Hinduism, Ghanananda travelled to Rishikesh in the Indian state of Uttarakhand, in northern India. He spent some time there with a spiritual guru who suggested him to open the monastery in Accra.

=== First meeting with Swami Krishnananda ===
In 1962, Swami Ghanananda moved to Accra and on 24 November, he formed the Divine Mystic Path Society. He then started correspondence courses on the Hindu way of life (Sanatana Dharma) with the Divine Life Society of Rishikesh, located in the foothills of the Himalayas in northern India, where he first met Swami Krishnananda of India and became his śishya (disciple), and then in 1975 Swami Krishnananda initiated Swami Ghanananda as a swami.
