= Hindu Monastery of Africa =

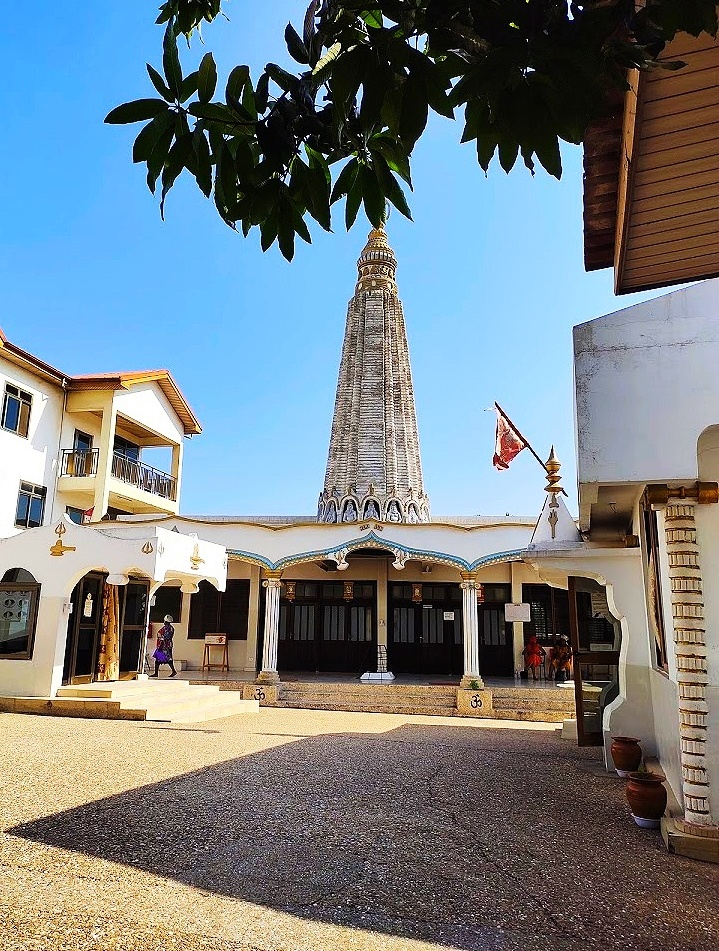
- Main building of the monastery in Odorkor, Accra

- Location within Ghana

Religion
- Festivals: Maha Shivaratri, Navaratri, Guru Purnima
- Leadership: Swami Satyananda Saraswati (since 2016)
- Status: Active

Location
- Location: Odorkor, Accra, Greater Accra Region, Ghana
- Country: Ghana
- Coordinates: 5.5703°N 0.2658°W

Architecture
- Established: 1975

Website
- Official website

The Hindu Monastery of Africa (HMA) is a Hindu monastic and temple complex headquartered in Odorkor, a suburb of Accra, in the Greater Accra Region of Ghana. Founded in 1975 by Swami Ghanananda Saraswati, it is widely regarded as the first Hindu monastery established and led by indigenous Africans. The monastery plays a central role in the practice and spread of Hinduism in Ghana among ethnic Ghanaians and has branches across the country as well as in neighboring Togo.

== History ==
=== Origins ===
Interest in Hinduism among indigenous Ghanaians began in the mid-20th century through printed literature and correspondence with Indian spiritual organizations such as the Divine Life Society of Swami Sivananda. In the 1960s, Kwesi Essel, a Ghanaian seeker, founded the Divine Mystic Path Society to introduce Hindu teachings to local audiences. Essel later traveled to India, where he was formally initiated into the order of sannyasa (monastic renunciation) by Swami Krishnananda Saraswati and given the name Swami Ghanananda Saraswati.

=== Foundation ===
On returning to Ghana in 1975, Ghanananda established the Hindu Monastery of Africa in Odorkor as a center for worship, spiritual training, and community outreach. The institution is noted as one of the first Hindu monasteries worldwide founded and led entirely by indigenous Africans. Its mission combined traditional Shaiva Hindu practices with localized expressions of spirituality suited to Ghana’s cultural context.

=== Expansion ===
During the late 20th century, the monastery grew steadily, attracting followers primarily from the Akan and other Ghanaian ethnic groups. By the early 2000s, it had become Ghana’s largest indigenous Hindu institution, establishing branch temples in cities such as Kumasi, Tema, and Cape Coast. In 2011, a branch was opened in Lomé, Togo, marking the spread of the movement beyond Ghana’s borders.

=== Leadership succession ===
Swami Ghanananda led the monastery until his passing on 18 January 2016. He was succeeded by Swami Satyananda Saraswati as the new spiritual head. In 2023, additional monks, including Swami Shankarananda and Swamini Geetananda, were initiated, indicating continued growth of the monastic order.

== Beliefs and Practices ==
The monastery follows Shaiva traditions, worshipping Shiva as the supreme deity, while also honoring other Hindu deities such as Ganesha, Krishna, and Durga. Daily practices include meditation, devotional chanting (bhajans), fire ceremonies (homa), and scriptural study. A distinctive feature of the monastery’s worship is its emphasis on sound and embodied experience; devotional music and mantra recitation play a central role in fostering spiritual connection.

The monastery celebrates major Hindu festivals including Diwali, Maha Shivaratri, and Navaratri.

== Community engagement ==
The HMA engages in a range of social service activities, such as free health screenings, support for orphanages, and disaster relief efforts. It also promotes interfaith harmony, sometimes displaying symbols from other traditions such as an image of Jesus Christ alongside Hindu icons, reflecting an inclusive philosophy.

== Architecture and facilities ==
The main temple complex in Odorkor is a modest whitewashed building with a central shrine dedicated to Shiva. Ritual spaces include a hall for group chanting and areas for meditation and study. Local Ghanaian cultural motifs are occasionally integrated into the design, reflecting the monastery’s synthesis of Hindu and African traditions.

== See also ==
- Hinduism in Ghana
- Hinduism in Togo
- Swami Ghanananda (Ghana)
