= West Ridge =

West Ridge may refer to:

- West Ridge, Accra, Ghana
- West Ridge, Arkansas, United States
- West Ridge, Chicago, Illinois, United States
- West Ridge (ship), a steam ship sunk in 1883

== See also ==
- West Ridge Academy, an academy in West Jordan, Utah
- West Ridge Mall, a mall in Topeka, Kansas
