= Achimota Transport Terminal =

Terminal in Ghana

Coordinates: 5.621512°N 0.225926°W

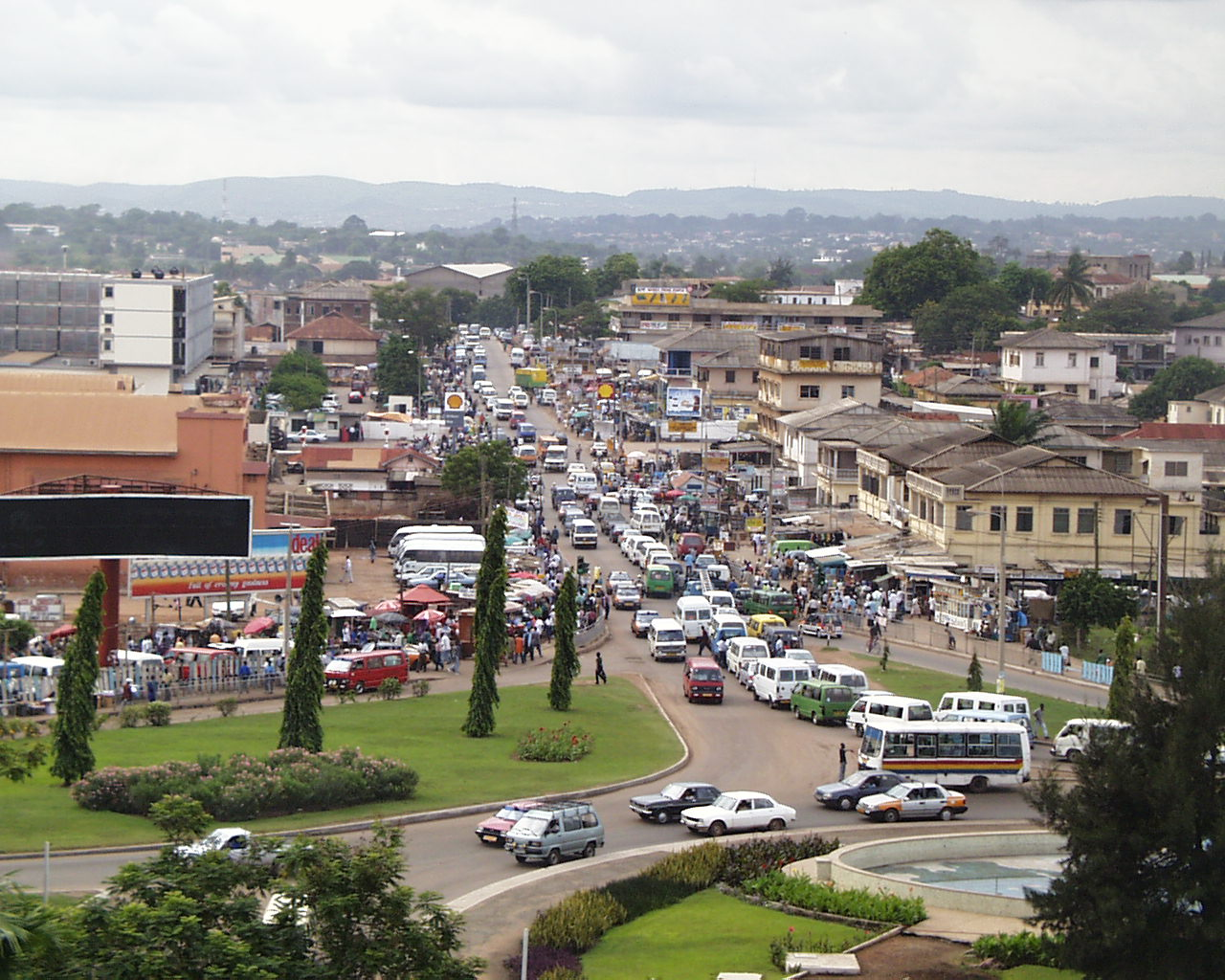
Accra Traffic

Achimota Transport Terminal was inaugurated in December, 2009, with the aim of reducing congestion on the Accra-Nsawam road. The terminal can accommodate 800 vehicles and includes other facilities such as a police station and a clinic. It was started by President Kufour but was inaugurated by the Mills administration.

== History ==
The construction of the terminal was started in 2004, by President Kufour of the New Patriotic Party. The aim was to reduce congestion on the Accra-Nsawam road, which was particularly heavy between the Apenkwa Interchange and Achimota. The road is used as a major route connecting Accra to other Ghanaian cities such as Kumasi and Tamale, as well as carrying traffic to Burkina Faso and Mali.

The project took around five years to finish and cost GH¢1.2 million. The terminal was officially opened on 17 December 2009.

== Facilities ==
The terminal has 800 vehicle parking spaces, 80 toilets, 10 canteen rooms, a clinic and a police station. There is also a separate area for charcoal trucks.
