= Abossey Okai Central Mosque =

Mosque in Accra, Ghana

- Location within Ghana

Religion
- Affiliation: Islam
- Ecclesiastical or organizational status: Mosque
- Status: Active

Location
- Location: Abossey Okai, Greater Accra Region
- Country: Ghana
- Interactive map of Abossey Okai Central Mosque
- Coordinates: 5°33′29″N 0°13′48″W

Architecture
- Style: Mosque
- Groundbreaking: November 9, 1969
- Completed: c. 1970s

Specifications
- Dome: 1
- Minaret: 2

The Abossey Okai Central Mosque, also known as the Accra Central Mosque, is a mosque in the Abossey Okai community of Accra, Ghana. Constructed in the 1970s, the mosque was established to cater to the Muslim community in Abossey Okai and neighboring areas such as Sabon Zango.

== History ==
In the 1980s, a pivotal shift occurred when the Central Mosque at the central market in Makola was burned and demolished by the then president of Ghana, Jerry Rawlings to pave way for the construction of the Rawlings Park. Subsequently, the Abossey Okai Mosque assumed the role of the central mosque for Accra. This transition positioned it as a key institution for the broader Muslim community in the capital city.

For a significant period, the Abossey Okai Mosque served as the venue for Friday prayers led by the Chief Imam of Ghana, Sheikh Osman Nuhu Sharubutu.

== Renovation ==
In 2020, the Vice President of Ghana, Mahamudu Bawumia promised to carry out a renovation of the Abossey Okai Central Mosque. He described that a gesture of gratitude to Allah for granting the New Patriotic Party (NPP) victory in the 2020 Ghanaian general election. He made the pledge when he addressed a Muslim congregation at an Islamic Thanksgiving ceremony held in December 2020 at the mosque.

== See also ==
- Islam in Ghana
- List of mosques in Ghana
