= Eastridge Mall =

Eastridge Mall may refer to the following shopping malls in the United States:

- Eastridge, in San Jose, California
- Eastridge Mall (Gastonia) in North Carolina, formerly Westfield Eastridge
- Eastridge Mall (Wyoming), in Casper
