= Airport Residential Area =

Town in Greater Accra Region, Ghana

Coordinates: 5°36′N 0°11′W

- Town
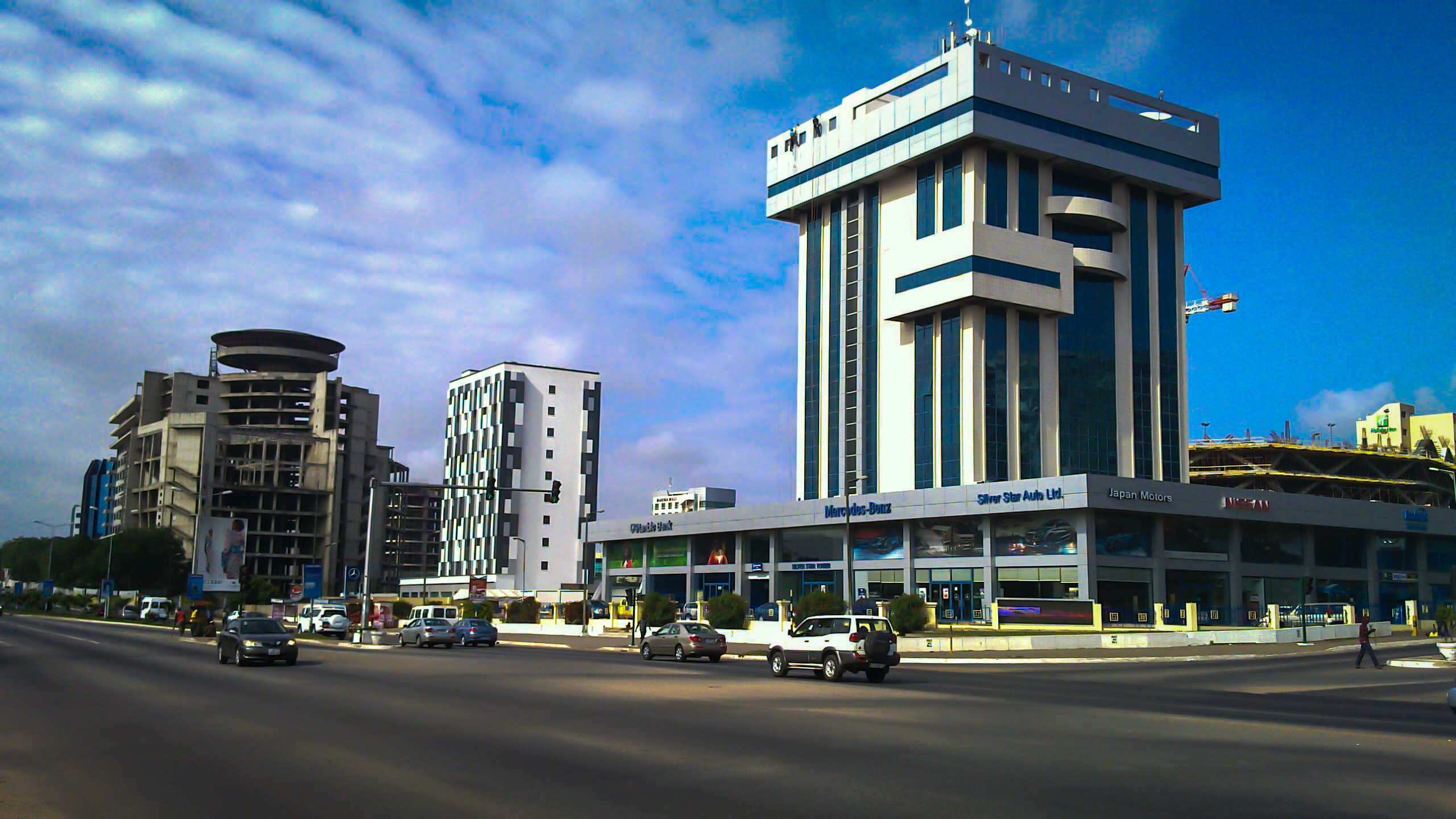
- Airport City, Greater Accra Street.

- Location within Ghana
- Country: Ghana
- Region: Greater Accra Region
- District: Accra Metropolitan
- Time zone: GMT
  - Summer (DST): GMT

Airport Residential Area is a town in the Accra Metropolitan district, a district of the Greater Accra Region of Ghana.
