= Alajo =

Coordinates: 5°36′N 0°13′W

- Town
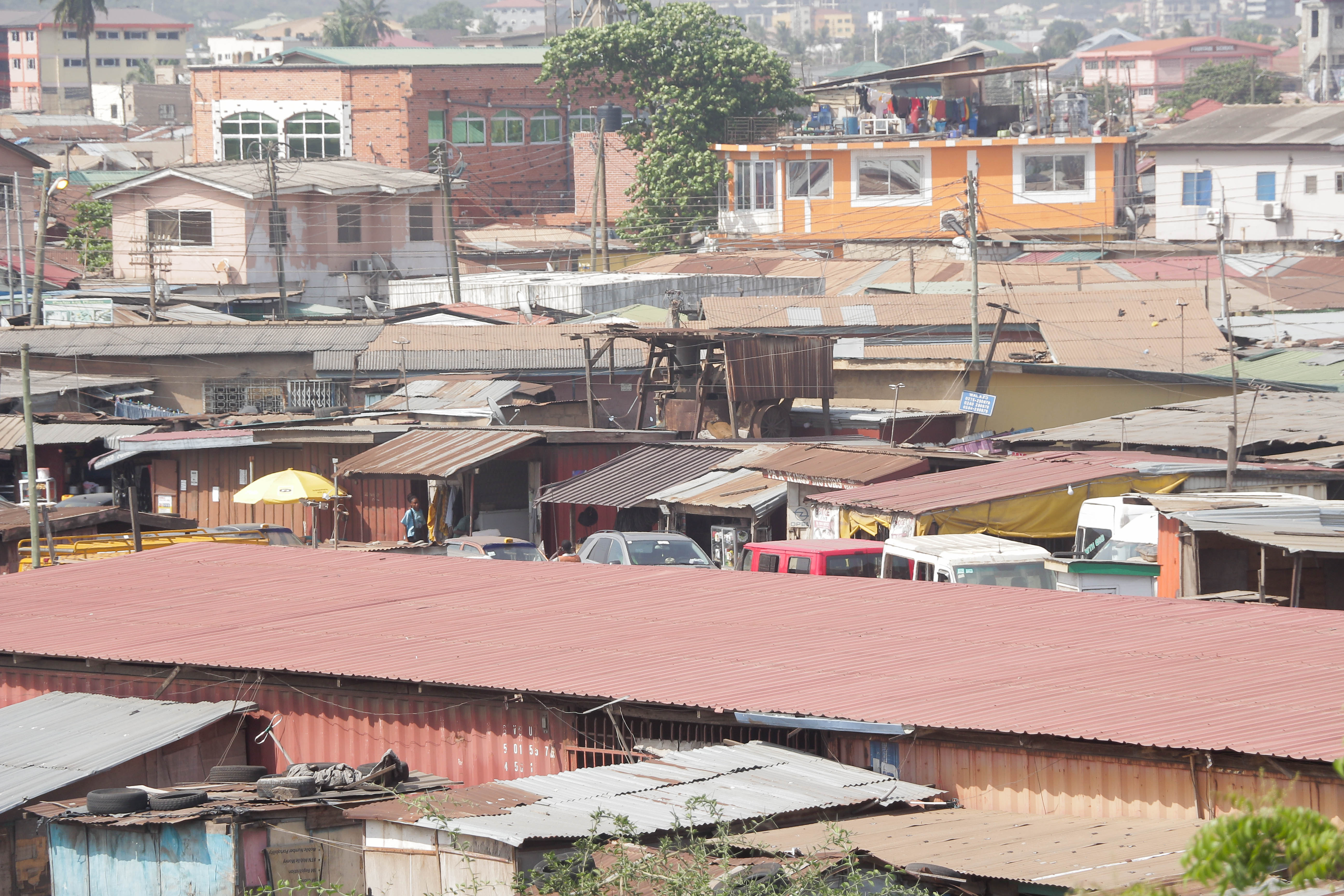

- Location within Ghana
- Country: Ghana
- Region: Greater Accra Region
- District: Accra Metropolitan
- Time zone: GMT
  - Summer (DST): GMT

Alajo is a suburb of Accra in the Accra Metropolitan district, a district of the Greater Accra Region of Ghana.
