= Asylum Down =

Coordinates: 5°34′N 0°12′W

- Interactive map of Asylum Down
- Country: Ghana
- Region: Greater Accra Region

Asylum Down is a district or neighborhood in Accra, Ghana, north of Castle Road and east of Barnes Road. It is named after the mental hospital located there. The district is home to the West African Examinations Council and is also known for Accra High School, which is a second cycle institution.

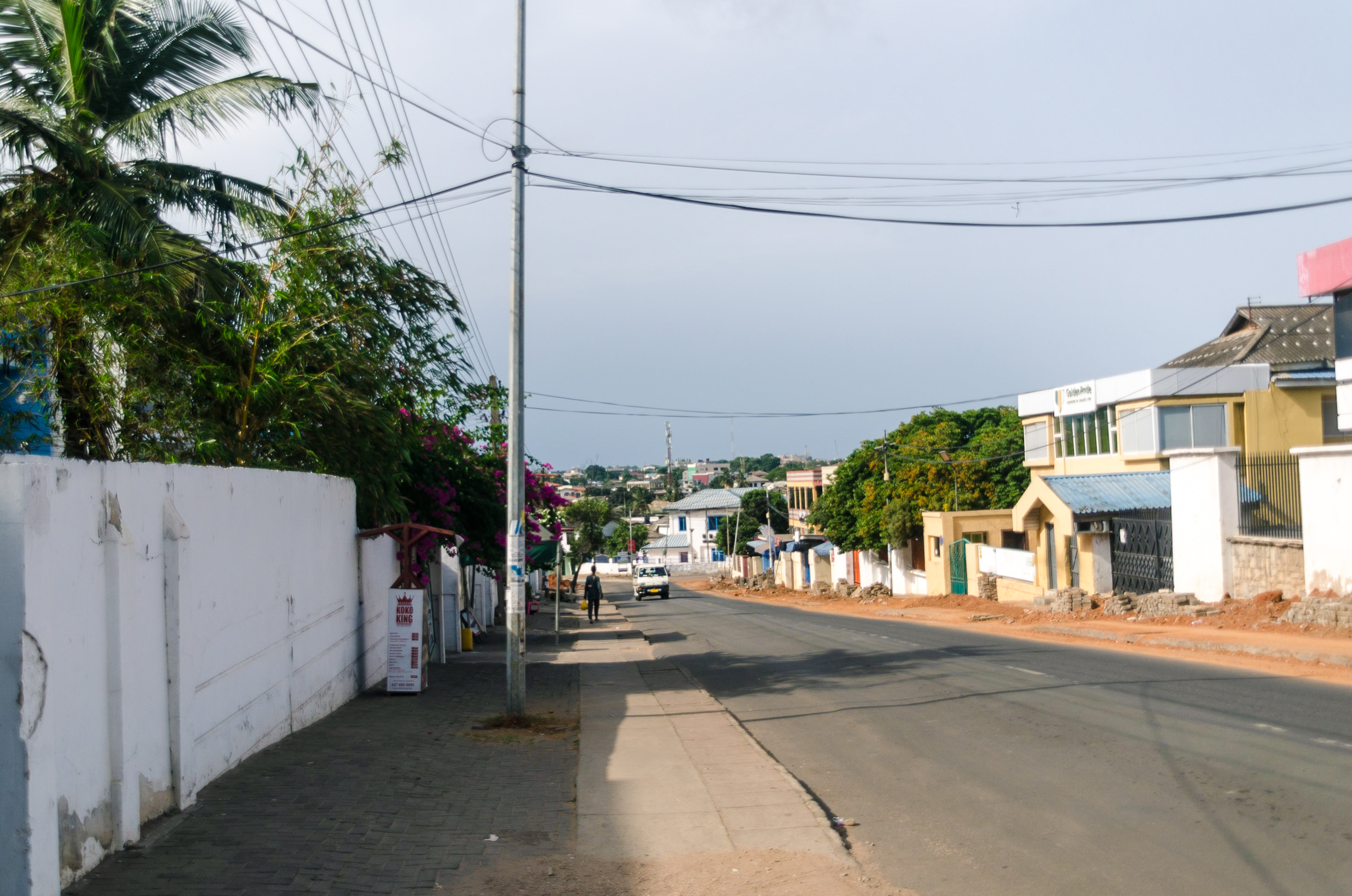
Asylum Down
