= Swalaba =

Neighborhood in Accra, Ghana

Swalaba is a neighborhood in Ghana’s capital city Accra. It is located in the city center between Korle Woko and Jamestown. Its population is mainly from the Ga tribal group, but also includes members of Hausa, Ewe, and Akan.
