= Mataheko =

Coordinates: 5°34′N 0°15′W

- Town
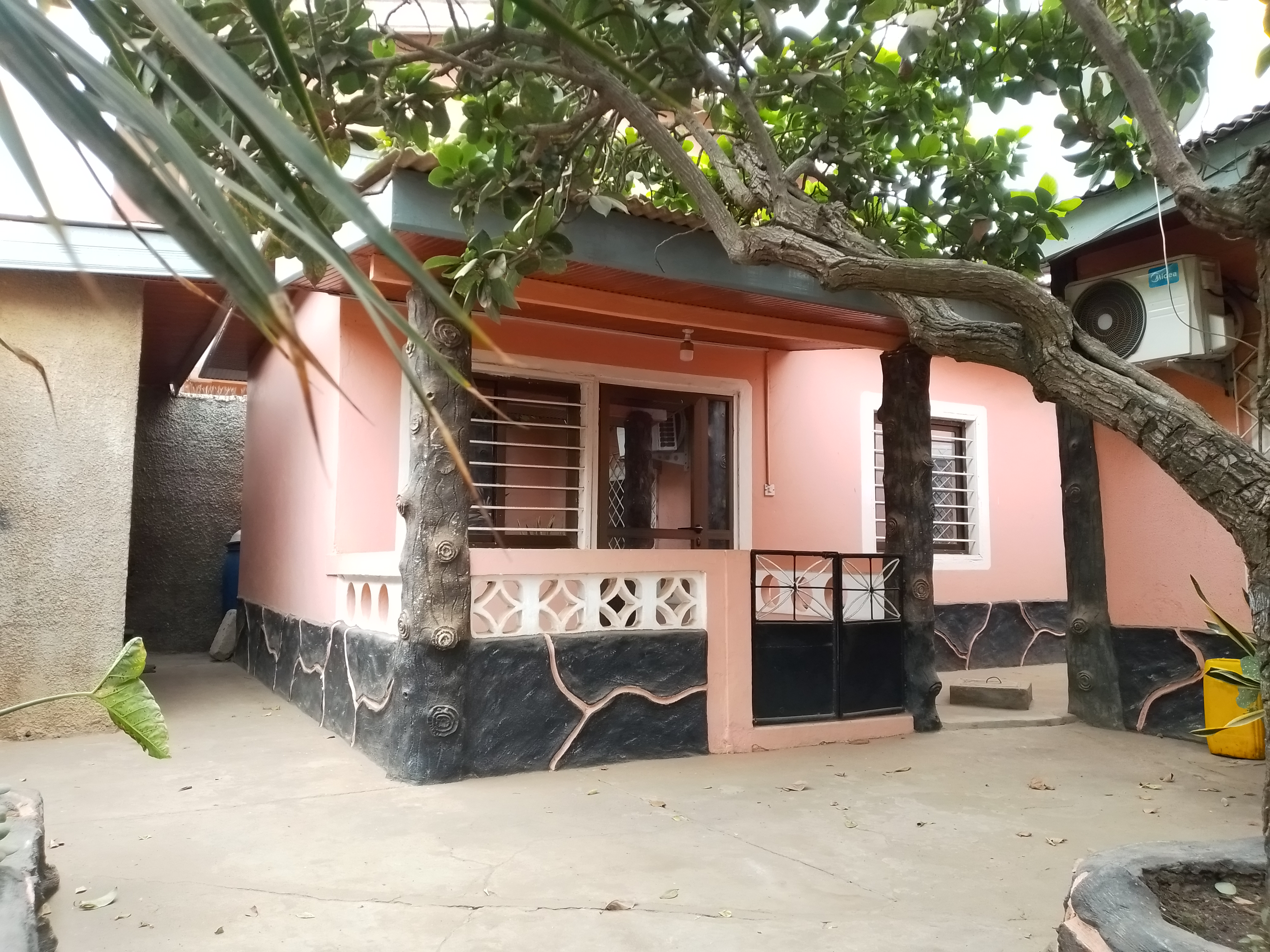
- House in Mataheko

- Location within Ghana
- Country: Ghana
- Region: Greater Accra Region
- District: Ablekuma Central Municipal
- Time zone: GMT
  - Summer (DST): GMT

Mataheko is a town in the Ablekuma Central Municipal district, a district of the Greater Accra Region of Ghana.
