= Abossey Okai =

Suburb of Accra, Ghana

Coordinates: 5°34′N 0°14′W

Abossey Okai is a town in the Ablekuma Central District which hosts the largest automobile-parts market of Ghana in the Greater Accra region. This Neighborhood has variety of workshops for metal engineering and vehicle repairs. It borders the Kaneshie market to the north and Sabon Zango to the south.

== See also ==
- Abossey Okai Central Mosque
