= East Legon =

- Town
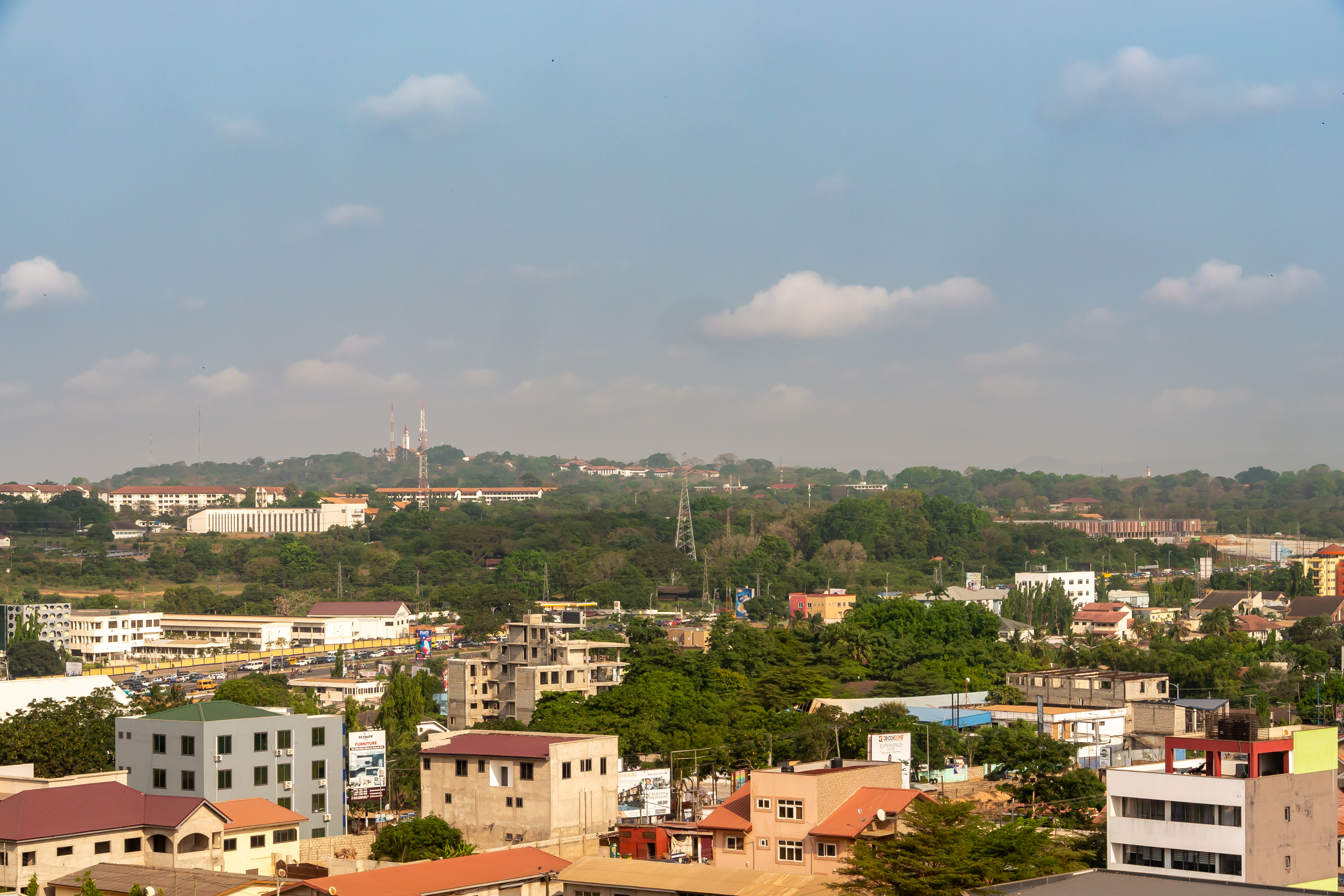
- Distant view of Legon Campus (University of Ghana) from East Legon

- Location within Ghana
- Coordinates: 5.636°N 0.159°W
- Country: Ghana
- Region: Greater Accra Region
- District: Ayawaso West Municipal District
- Time zone: GMT
  - Summer (DST): GMT

East Legon is a town in the Ayawaso West Municipal District of the Greater Accra Region of Ghana.

East Legon has a total area of 4.95 km^{2} (1.91 mi^{2}) and a total distance of 9.36 km (5.82 mi). It is an 11-minute drive from the Kotoka International Airport and a 38-minute drive from the Tema Harbour.

The Flower Pot interchange was constructed to ease traffic to East Legon.
