= Nii Boi Town =

- Town
- Country: Ghana
- Region: Greater Accra Region
- District: Accra Metropolitan
- Time zone: GMT
  - Summer (DST): GMT

Nii Boi Town is a town in the Accra Metropolis District, a district of the Greater Accra Region of Ghana.

The major language spoken in Nii Boi Town is Twi, which is also the local language of the Greater Accra Region of Ghana.
