= West Ridge, Accra =

Neighbourhood of Accra, Ghana

West Ridge
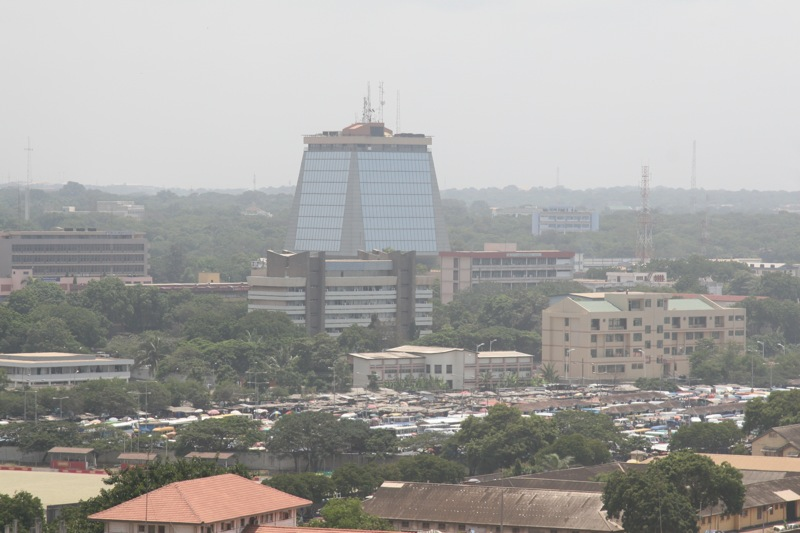

- Location within Ghana
- 5.559025°N 0.20335°W
- Location: Roughly: W: Barnes Road; S: Kinbu Gardens; N: Castle Road; E: Independence Avenue

Site notes
- Governing body: Accra Metropolitan Assembly

West Ridge is a neighbourhood of Accra, Ghana, bounded to the south by Kinbu Gardens. Barnes Road serves as the neighbourhood's western boundary, while Independence Avenue/Liberation Avenue is the eastern boundary. Castle Road separates West Ridge from the northern neighbourhood of North Ridge. The Accra branch of the British Council is located in West Ridge, off Liberia Road.

Originally planned as a neighbourhood for civil servants and businessmen in the colonial era, West Ridge is gradually being transformed into a commercial district. Among the new office towers situated in the district are the Heritage Tower, Accra Financial Centre, Ridge Tower, and Cedi House.

The Movenpick Ambassador Hotel, originally named the Ambassador Hotel and built as a gift by the United Kingdom to Ghana after independence in 1957, is located in West Ridge and caters to business clientele.

The area of West Ridge, North Ridge, and East Ridge is collectively referred to as "Ridge". This area is populated by several major embassies, including those of Germany and the United Kingdom. In addition, several of Accra's upmarket hotels, and several Ghanaian administrative offices are located in this district.

== Landmarks/places of interest ==
- Kinbu Gardens
- Cedi House
- Ghana Stock Exchange
- Accra Financial Centre
- World Trade Centre, Accra
- British Council
