= Achimota Forest =

Forest reserve in Achimota, Ghana

Achimota Forest Reserve
- Achimota National Forest Reserve
- IUCN category VI (protected area with sustainable use of natural resources)
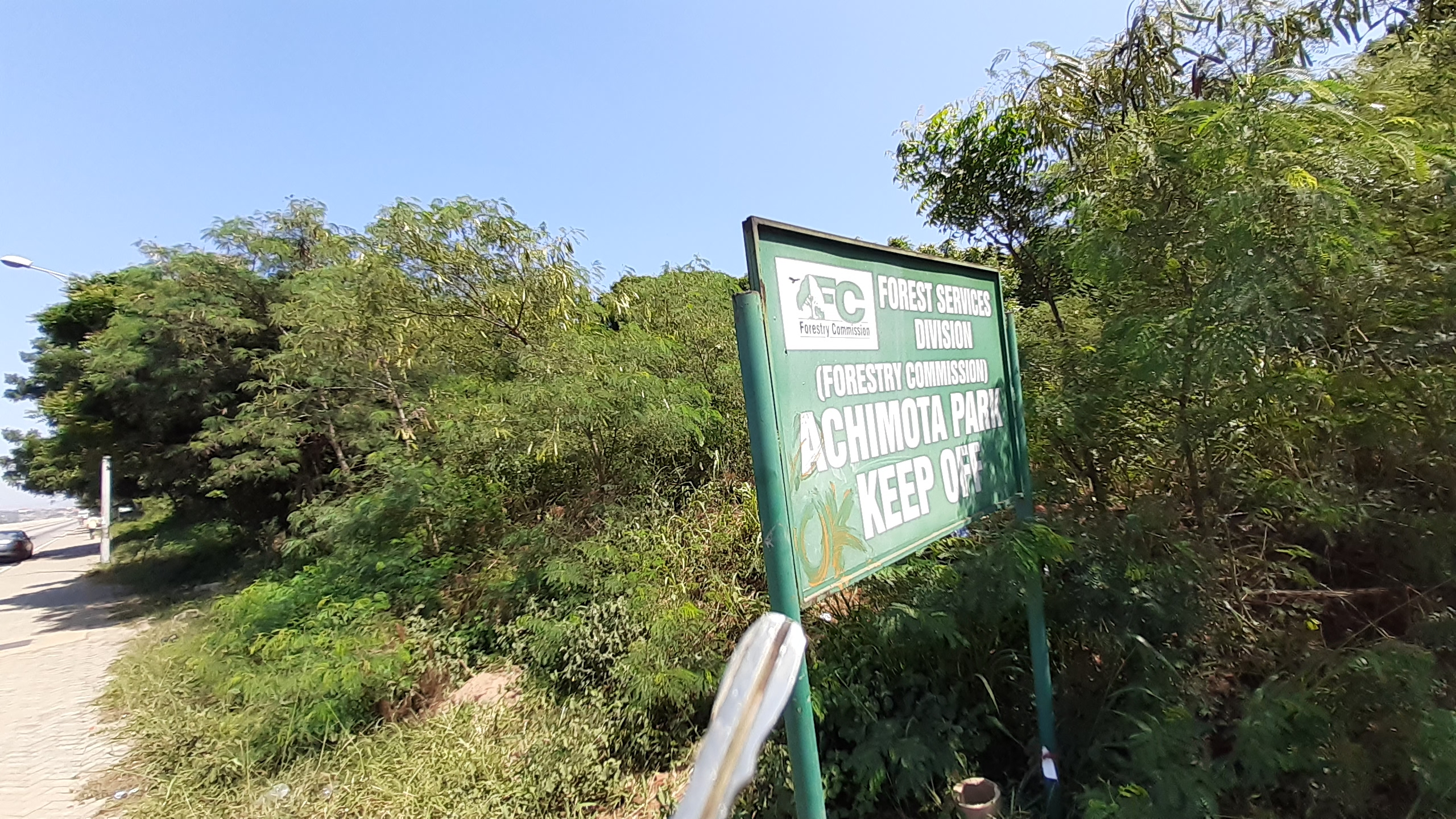
- Sign post of the Achimota Forest Reserve

- Location within Ghana
- Location: Okaikwei North Municipality, Greater Accra Region, Ghana
- Nearest city: Accra
- Coordinates: 5°37′28.9″N 0°12′13.5″W
- Area: 360 ha (890 acres)
- Established: 1930

Achimota Forest Reserve is a forest in Achimota in the Okaikwei North Municipality in the Greater Accra Region. It is located approximately 7.6 km (4.7 mi) from Accra. It is under protection against unauthorized usage such as poaching, construction of homes, hunting and shopping malls by individuals and groups. It is one of the green facilities in Accra assisting with control of carbon emissions.

== History ==
The forest was gazetted in 1930 and had a total size of 494.95 hectares (1,223.0 acres). Currently, the size of the forest reserve is about 360 hectares (890 acres). This Forest Reserve was established to create a green buffer between the Accra City and the Achimota School. Most of the animals from the Accra Zoo were moved to the forest reserve when the Presidential Palace was built. Currently, it is managed as an arboretum and Wildlife Rescue Center. Animals such as pythons, a camel, ostriches, hyenas, monkeys and others can be found in the forest reserve.

== Current ==
The Ghana Forestry Commission planned to change the forest reserve into an eco-tourism center called the "Accra Eco Park". It is expected to have watering points, salt licks, viewing platforms, landscaping, veterinary, introduction of wildlife, biodiversity hotspots, camping sites, road network, eco-lodges and fencing.

== Benefits ==
- Maintenance of animal species which allows wild animals and birds to be in their natural habitats.
- Revenue from tourism
- Promotion of clean energy through human health and environmental quality.
- Promotion of species from extinction.
- Improvements in air and water quality, richer terrestrial and aquatic habitat, cooler air temperatures.
- Reservoir of medicinal plants such as the preservation of plants and herbs which has medical benefits.
- Reduction of radiation levels by increasing greenhouse gases.

== Controversy ==
In May 2022, it was reported that parts of the forest were declassified as a forest reserve. Samuel Abu Jinapor denied that the Government had gazetted an Executive Instrument (E.I.) to approve the re-designation, sale or development of the forest reserve. A family called the Owoo family claimed to be the original owners of the land that has the forest reserve. Between 1921 and 1927, the land was acquired by the colonial government for the Achimota School which was started by a family related to the Sam's of Komenda called the Cobbah's to which Kwajil Aggrey is a relative. In a statement, the family claimed they did not receive compensation for the 1927 acquisition. The family also claimed they suffered, 'grave historical injustice' because they have not taken custody of the land.
