= Christian Village =

Coordinates: 5°38′N 0°13′W

- Town
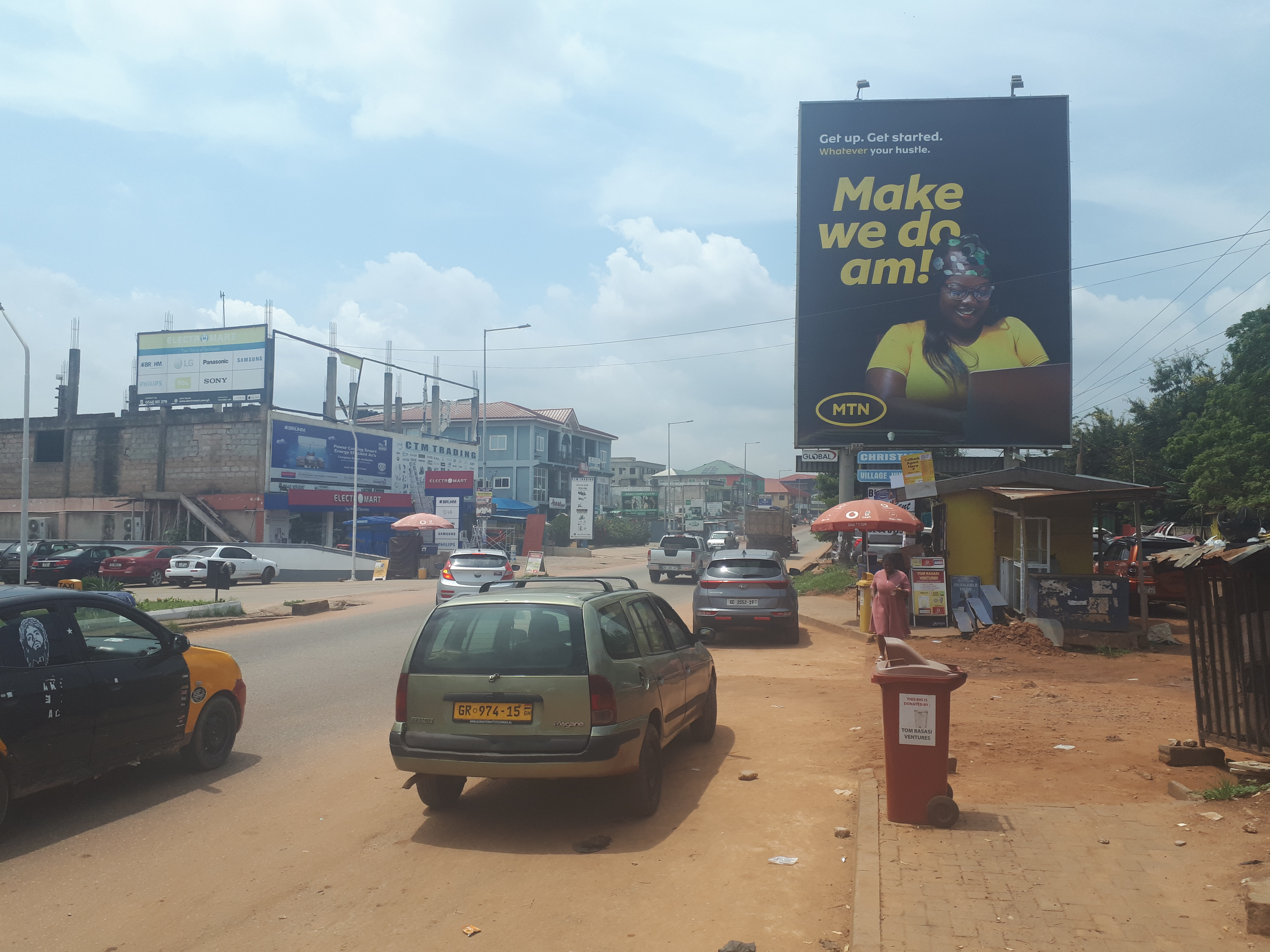
- Trotro stop in Christian Village

- Location within Ghana
- Country: Ghana
- Region: Greater Accra Region
- District: Accra Metropolitan
- Time zone: GMT
  - Summer (DST): GMT

Christian Village is a town in the Accra Metropolitan district, a district of the Greater Accra Region of Ghana.
