= Cedi House =

Office building in Accra, Ghana

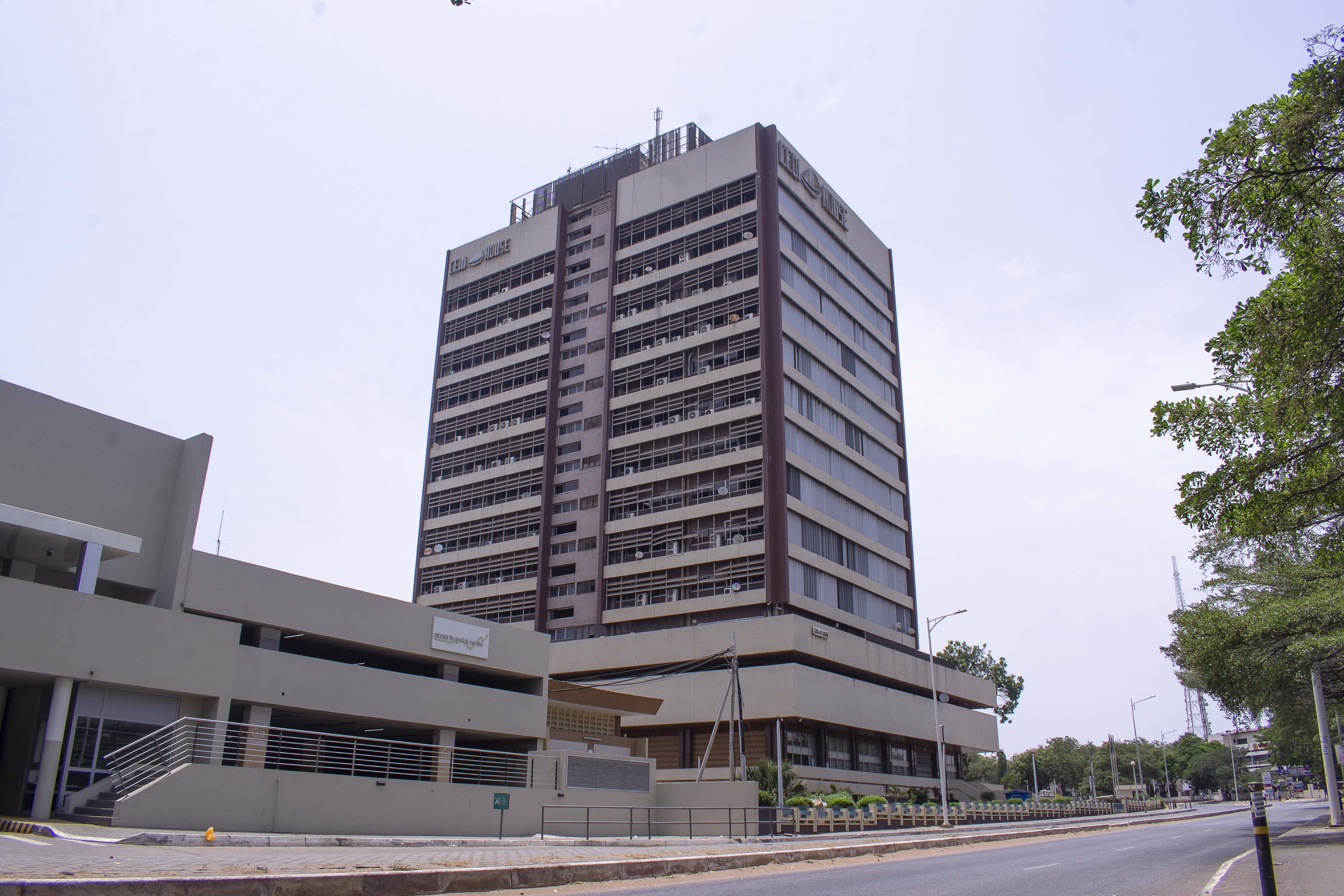
- Former names: Bank of Ghana (BoG)office annex A

General information
- Type: Offices, Banks
- Location: Accra, Ghana
- Coordinates: 5.555605°N 0.201478°W
- Construction started: 1970; 56 years ago
- Completed: 1973; 53 years ago

Technical details
- Floor count: 14

Cedi House is a 14-storey building in Accra, Ghana that houses the Bank of Ghana and the Ghana Stock Exchange. Cedi House is located at Victoria Borg on the main Independence Avenue in Ridge Accra.

== History ==
The Â Bank of Ghana (BoG) Office Building Annex Â which is simply referred to as the CEDI House. Started in 1970 and completed in 1973, the building houses the Banking and Supervision Â Departments as well as the Central Securities Depository of the BoG. It was designed by Ghanaian architect Professor John Owusu Addo, who is the brain behind many other iconic buildings in Ghana, including the unity hall of KNUST.

It also is home to the Ghana Stock Exchange (GSE) and a host of other prestigious companies and banks.

Consisting of fourteen floors with two additional underground floors, the CEDI House is one of the tallest buildings in the country and its proximity to the Central Business District of Accra makes it a prime office location for top companies.

== Tenants ==
- Bank of Ghana All floors except 4th
- Ghana Stock Exchange 4th Floor
