= Achimota =

- town
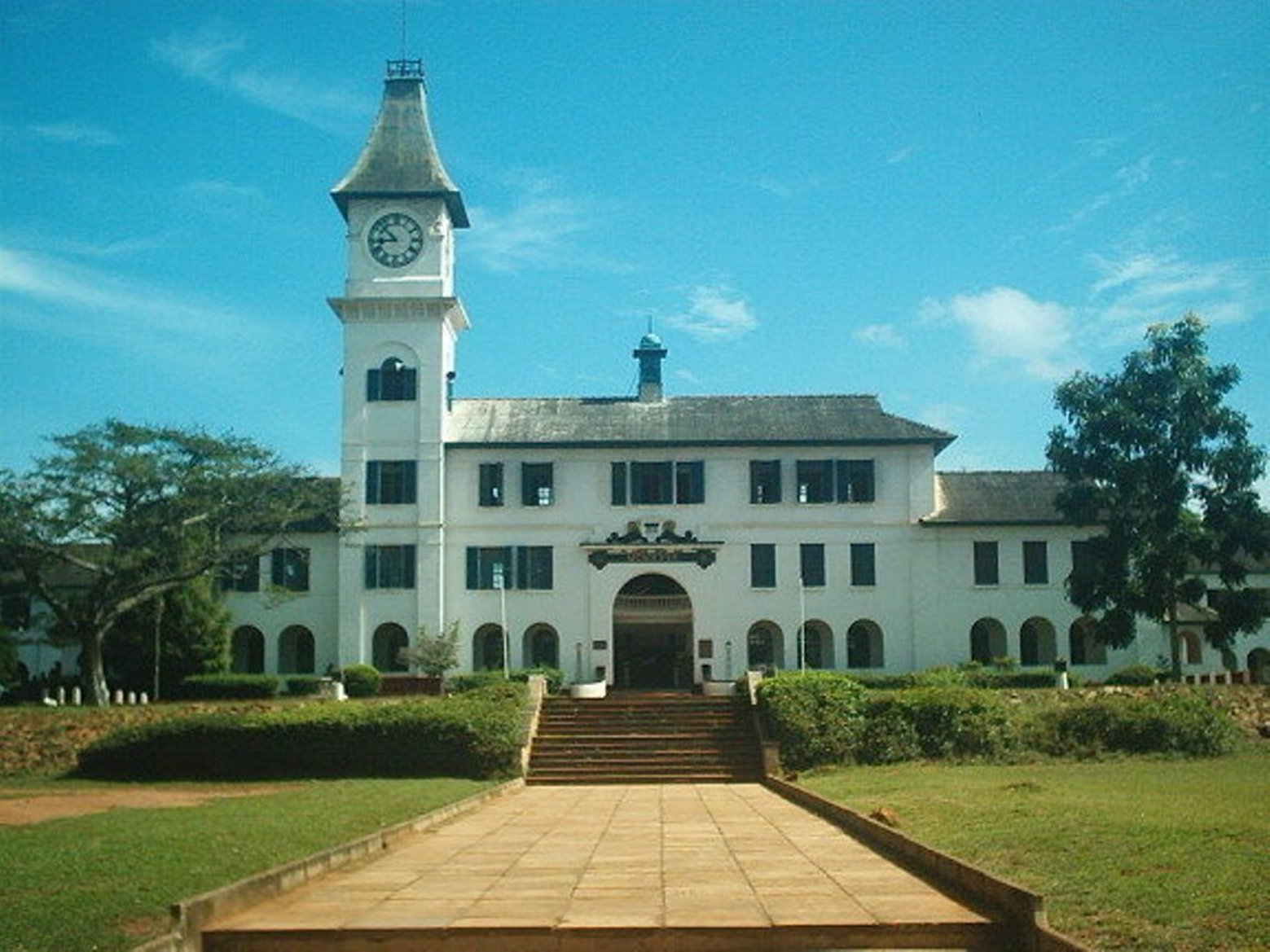
- Administration block of Achimota School

- Location within Ghana
- Coordinates: 5°37′00″N 00°14′00″W
- Country: Ghana
- Region: Greater Accra Region
- District: Accra Metropolitan
- Elevation: 85 ft (26 m)
- Time zone: GMT
  - Summer (DST): GMT

Achimota (/ɑːtʃimoʊtɑː/ ah-ch-ee-m-oh-t-ah), is a town in the Accra Metropolitan District, a district of the Greater Accra Region of Ghana. Achimota means "speak no name" in the Ga language. In pre-colonial Ghana, its forbidden forest was a "silent" refuge for runaway slaves.

== Education ==
Achimota is known for the eponymous Achimota School, as well as the St. John's Grammar School. Achimota is located on the Accra highway just after Tesano and has well laid buildings, bars and a good nightlife.

== Healthcare ==
Achimota Hospital, located near the Achimota Golf Course, is the primary healthcare institution in Achimota.

== Transport ==
Achimota is served by a station on the Ghana Railways.

== Facilities ==
- Achimota Police Station
- Achimota Golf Course
- Achimota Forest

== See also ==
- Achimota Transport Terminal
- Railway stations in Ghana
