= Tesano =

Place in Greater Accra Region, Ghana

Coordinates: 5°36′20″N 0°14′08″W

Tesano is a suburb of Accra, Ghana. It is on the main Accra–Kumasi Highway before Achimota. The main campus of Ghana Technology University College is located inside Tesano.
