= North Ridge, Accra =

Neighbourhood in Greater Accra, Ghana

North Ridge
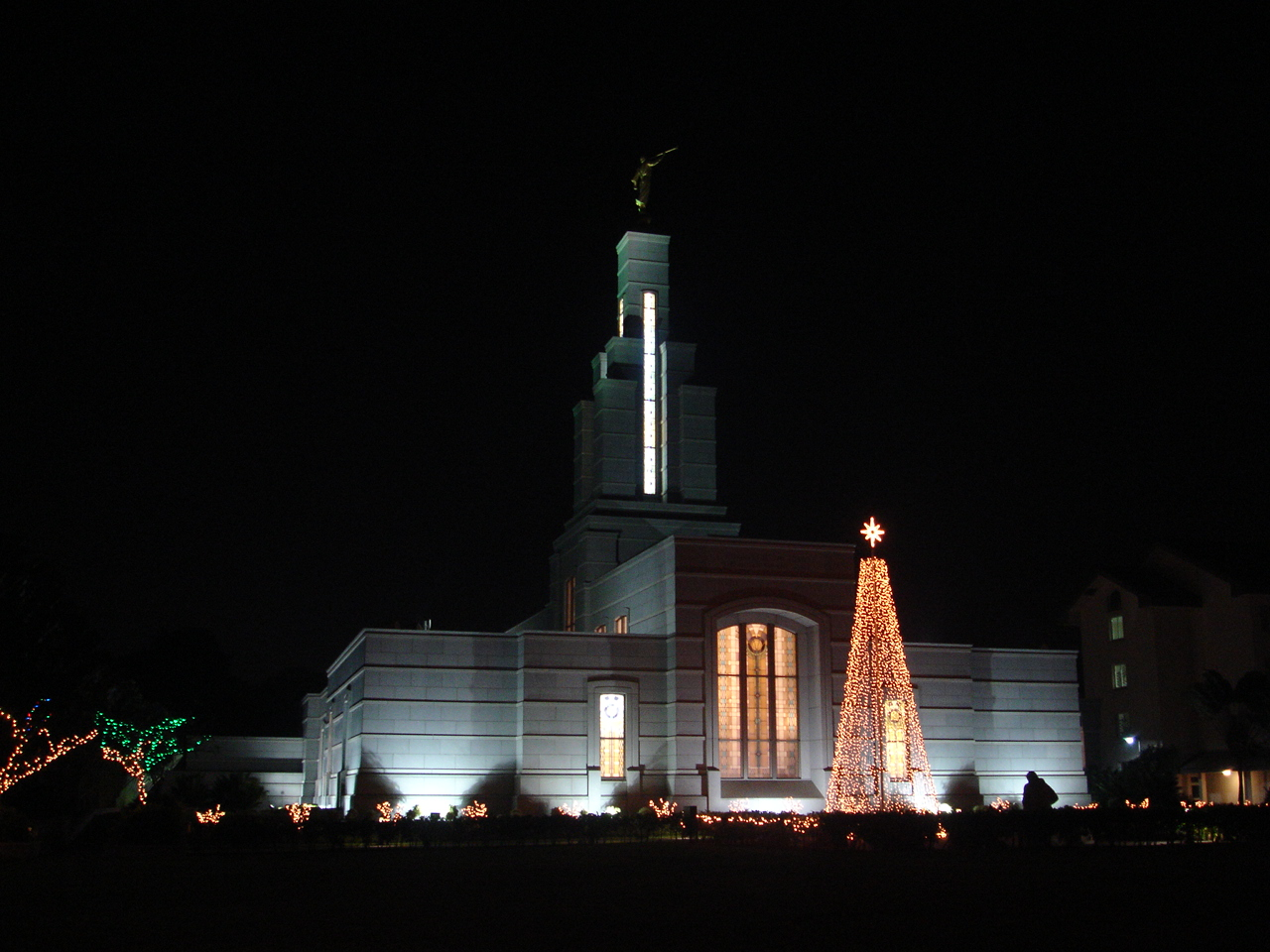
- Accra Ghana Temple
- Interactive map of North Ridge
- Location: Roughly: W: Hilla Limann highway S: Castle Road; N: Ring Road East; E: Sunkwa Road
- Governing body: Korle-Klottey Municipal Assembly

North Ridge is a neighbourhood in Greater Accra, Ghana, bounded to the south by Castle Road. Kanda Highway serves as the district's western boundary, while Independence Avenue/Liberation Avenue is the eastern boundary. The Ring Road separates North Ridge from the northern district of Kanda. The headquarters of the Bureau of National Investigations is located in North Ridge. Originally planned as a neighbourhood for civil servants and businessmen in the colonial era, North Ridge remains one of the better residential neighbourhoods in Accra.

The area of North Ridge, West Ridge, and East Ridge is collectively referred to as "The Ridge". This area is populated by several major embassies, including those of Germany and the United Kingdom. In addition, several of Accra's up-market hotels, and several Ghanaian administrative offices are located in this neighbourhood.

== Landmarks/places of interest ==
- Bureau of National Investigations
- German Embassy
- Accra Ghana Temple of the Church of Jesus Christ of Latter Day Saints
- Ridge Hospital
- Songhai Africa
- Untamed Empire Concept store and Art Incubator
- Residence of former President Jerry John Rawlings

== Gallery ==
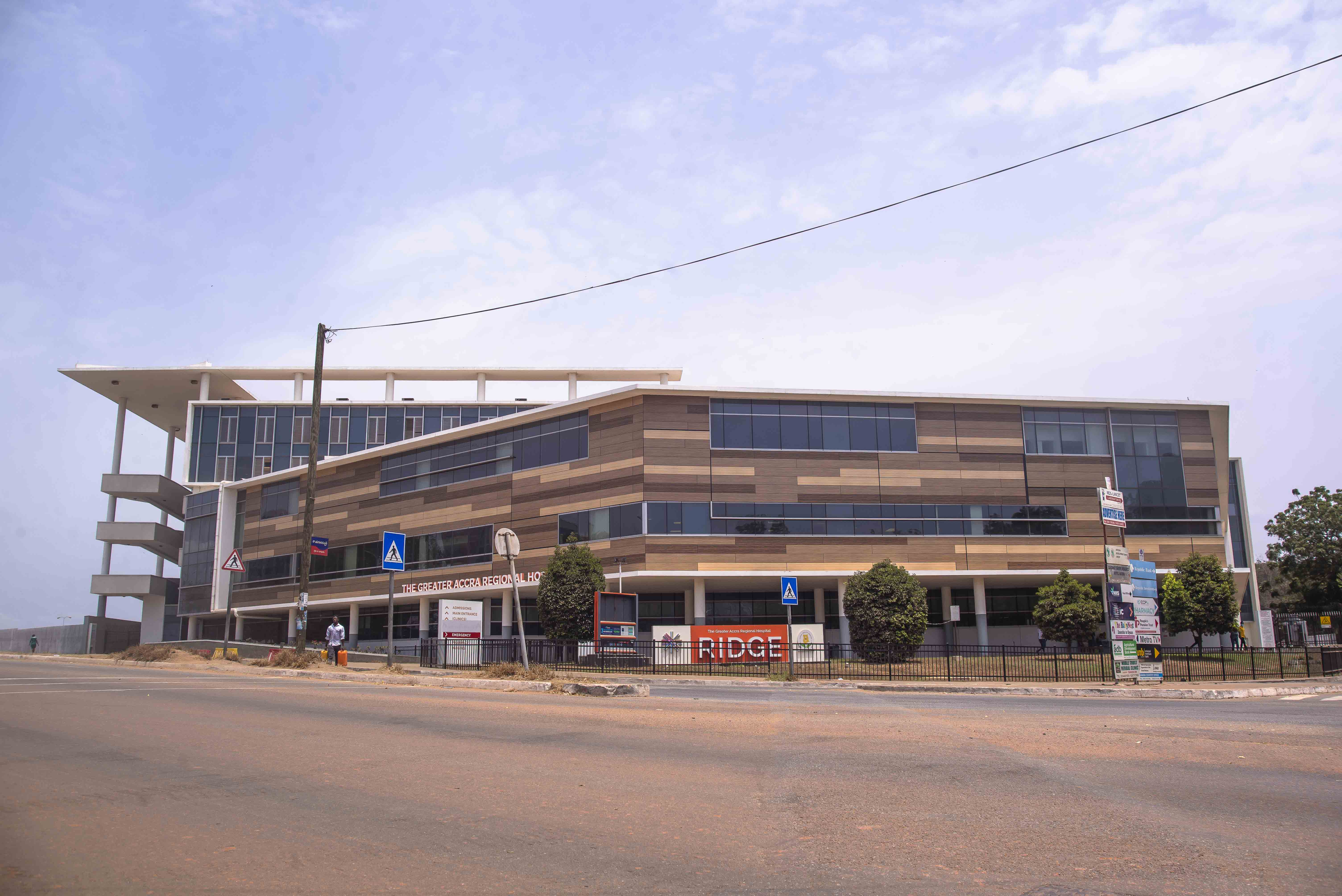
Ridge Hospital

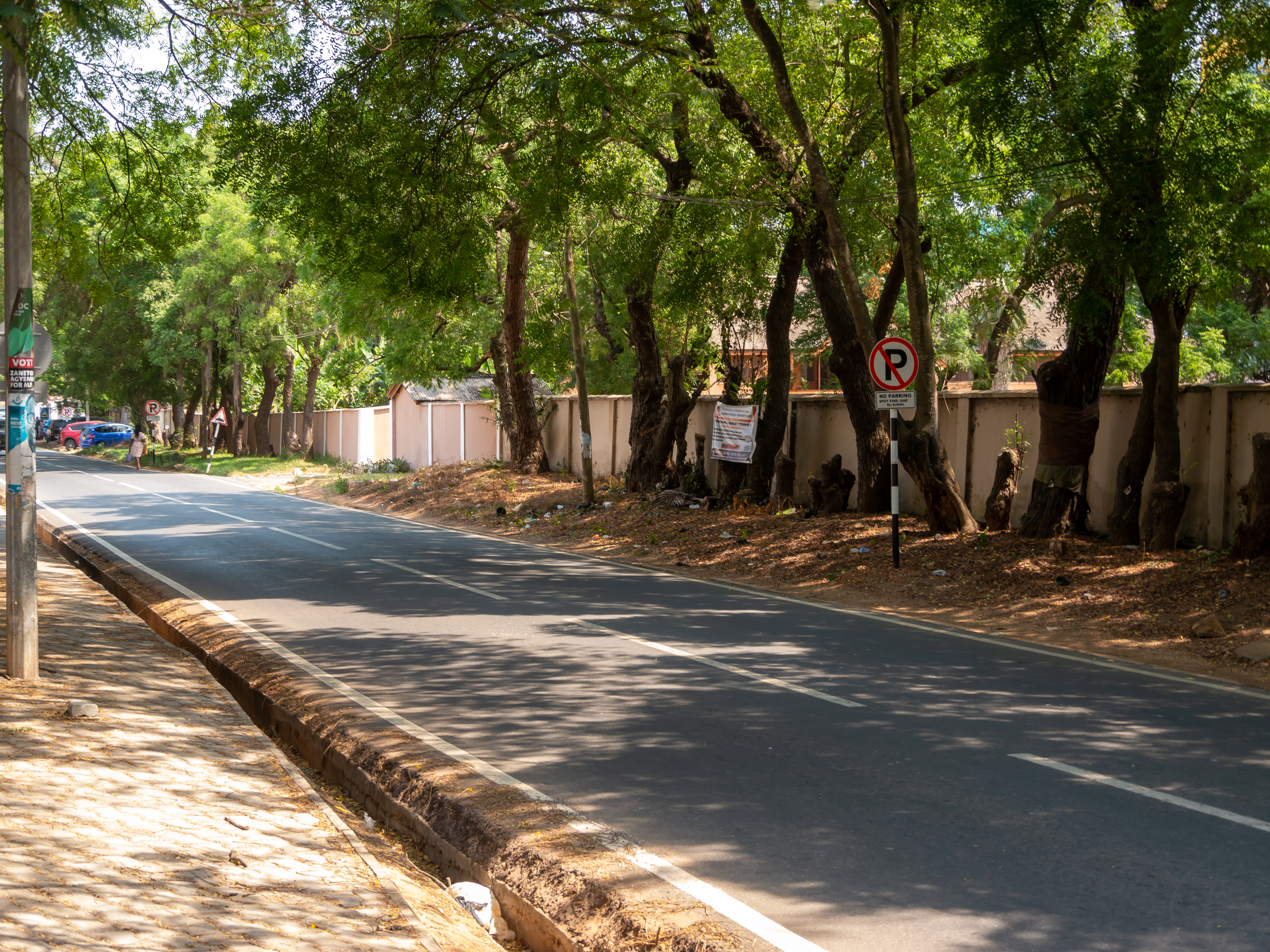
Sekou Touré Street in North Ridge

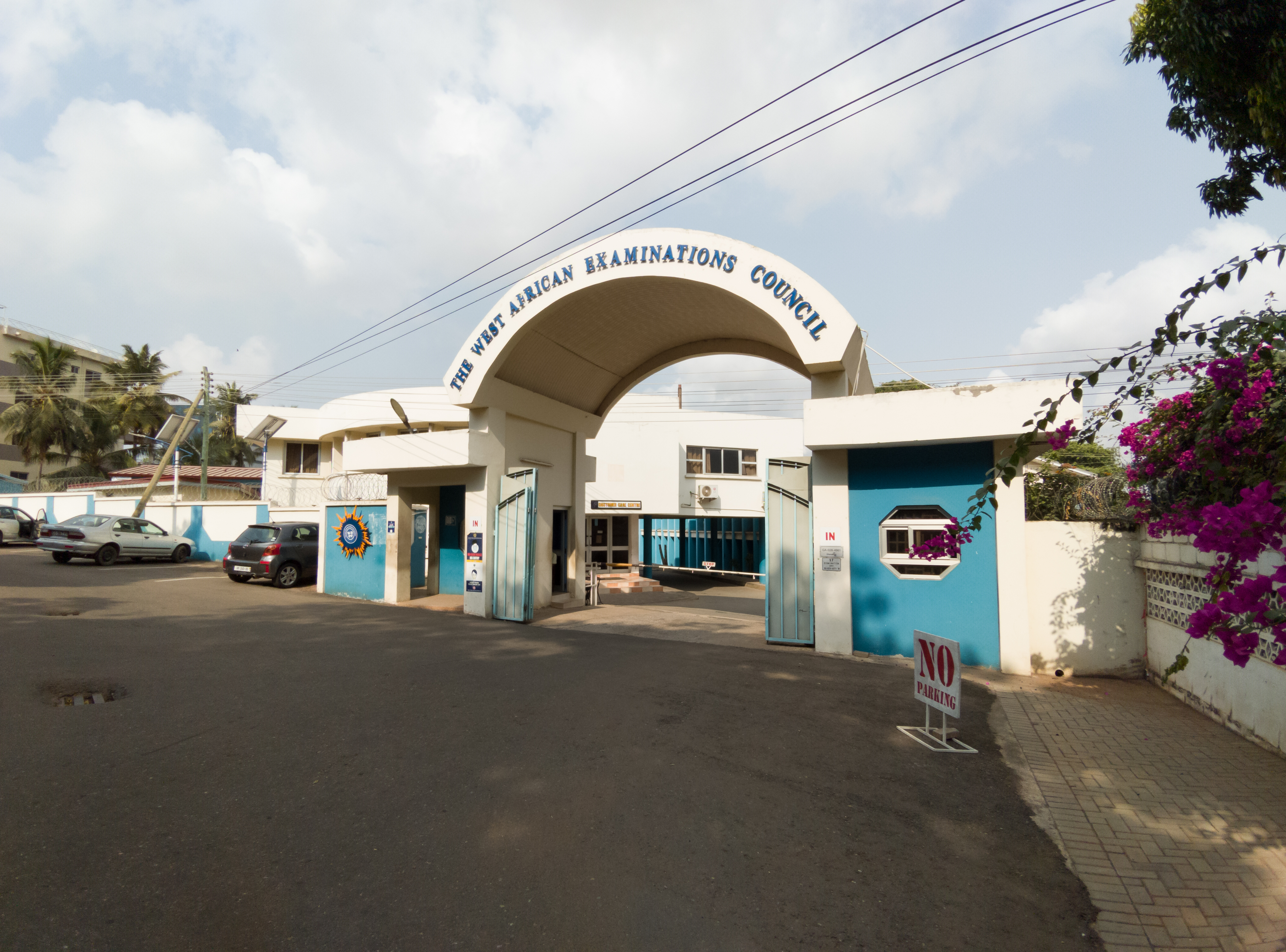

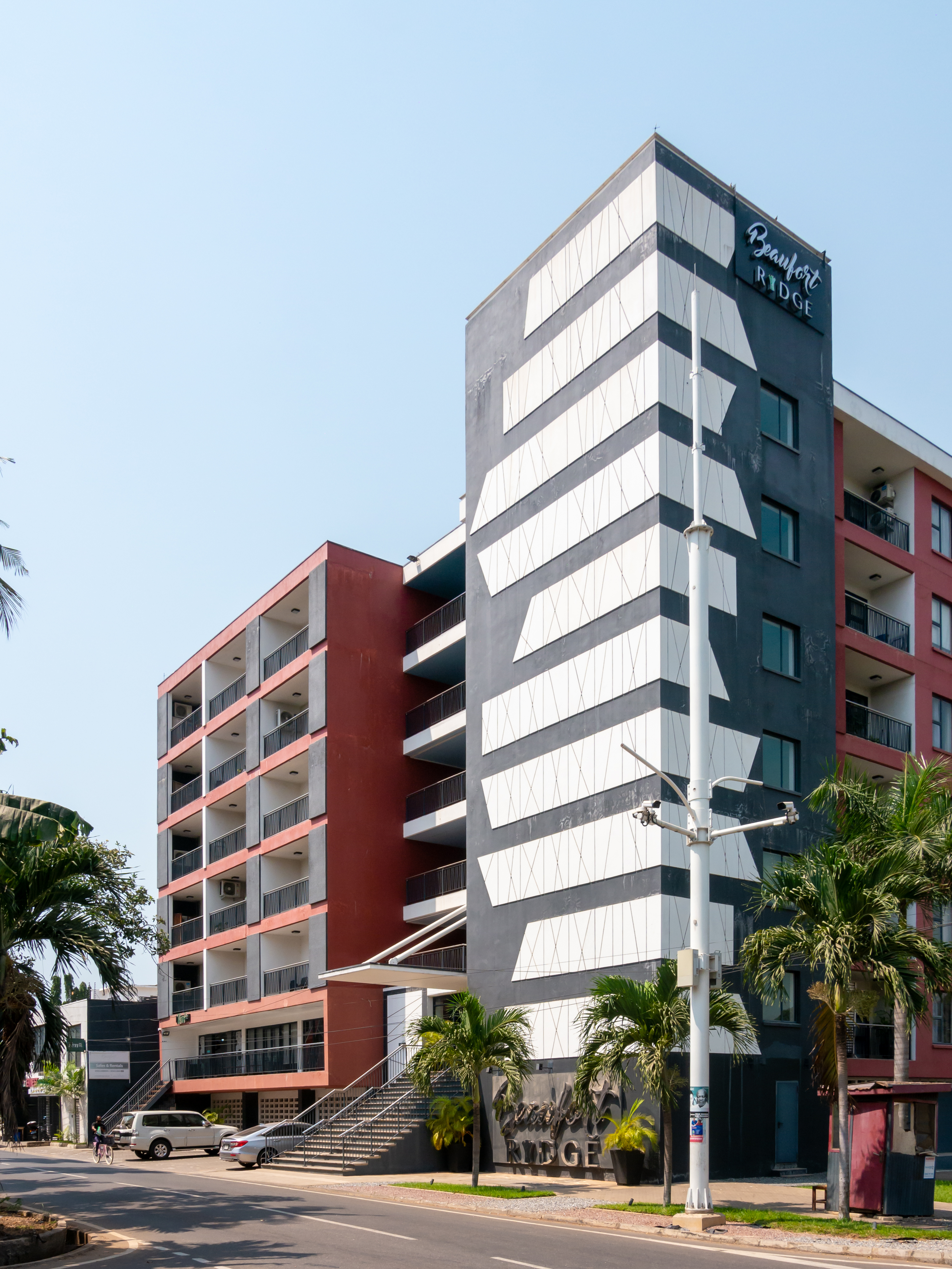
