= East Ridge High School =

East Ridge High School may refer to:

- East Ridge High School (Florida), Clermont, Florida
- East Ridge High School (Kentucky), Lick Creek, Kentucky
- East Ridge High School (Minnesota), Woodbury, Minnesota
- East Ridge High School (Tennessee), East Ridge, Tennessee
- Eastridge High School, Irondequoit, New York
