= Kisseman =

- Town
- Country: Ghana
- Region: Greater Accra Region
- District: Accra Metropolitan
- Time zone: GMT
  - Summer (DST): GMT

Kisseman is a town in the Accra Metropolis District, a district of the Greater Accra Region of Ghana. It is one of the populated towns in Ghana, with inadequate drainage systems. The people of Kisseman often face difficulty during the rainy seasons. Most homes are flooded, lives and properties are also lost as a result of heavy rains.
