= Lavender Hill (Accra) =

Venue in Jamestown, Ghana

Lavender Hill (Accra) is a venue located at Jamestown in the Greater Accra Region of Ghana where the Accra Metropolitan Assembly disposes liquid waste directly into the sea (Atlantic Ocean). The AMA tried shutting down the site in 2012 but failed.

== Environmental effects ==
The large amount of waste disposal has caused stench from the hill.
