= Abelemkpe =

- Suburb
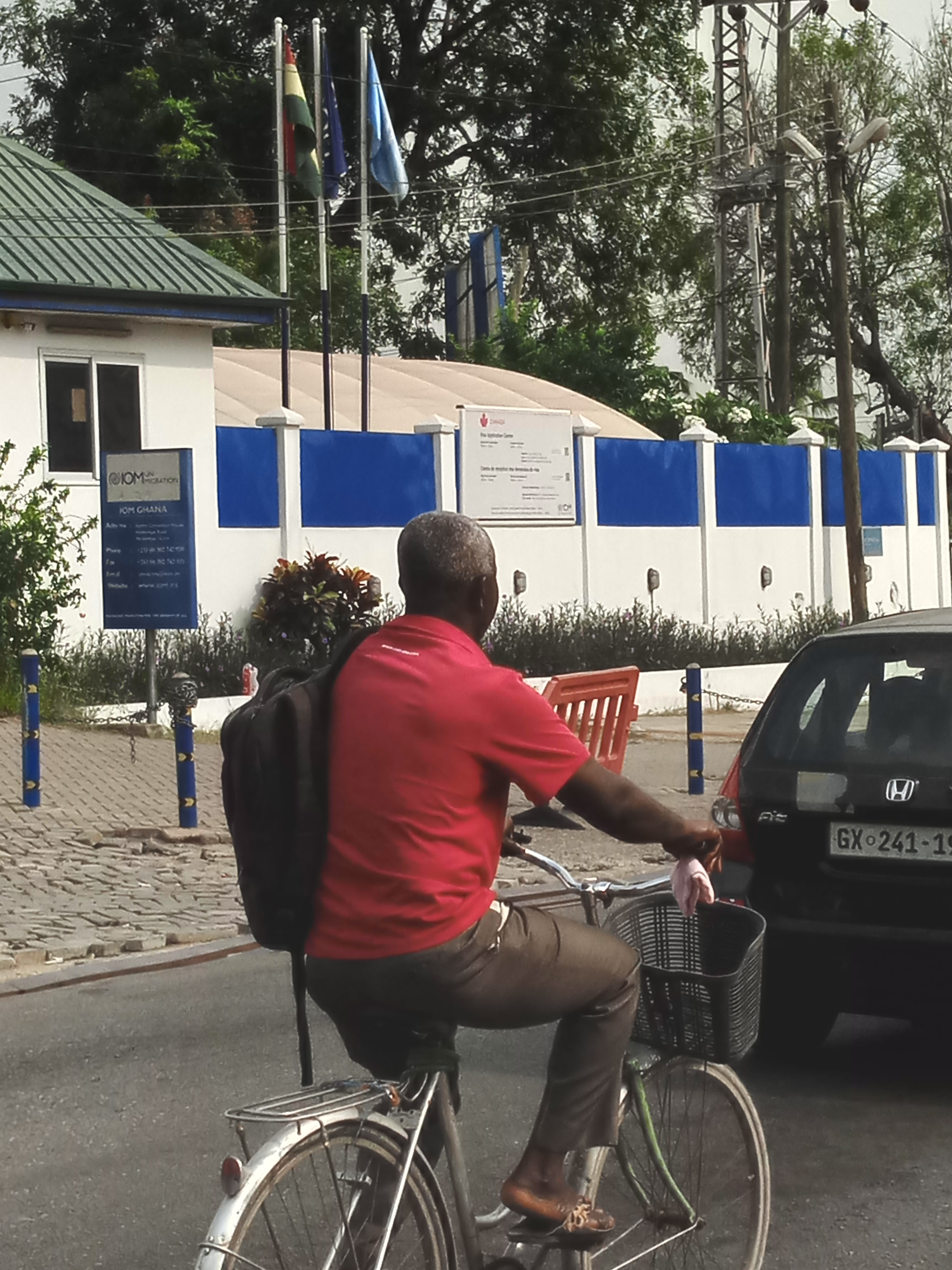

- Location within Ghana
- Coordinates: 5°37′N 0°13′W
- Country: Ghana
- Region: Greater Accra Region
- District: Accra Metropolitan
- Elevation: 174 ft (53 m)
- Time zone: GMT
  - Summer (DST): GMT

Abelenkpe is an urban area in the Accra Metropolitan district, a district of the Greater Accra Region of Ghana. Abelenkpe is located in the northern part of the Accra Metropolitan District in the Greater Accra Region.

Abelemkpe is located approximately 6 km north of the city centre and is divided into two main sections: Old Abelemkpe and New Abelemkpe. The area is also referred to as the “Abelemkpe Forest” due to its extensive tree cover.

== The New Abelempke ==
New Abelemkpe is predominantly inhabited by academics, affluent residents and expatriates. Housing in this section largely consists of modern low-rise apartment blocks accompanied by small outbuildings commonly known as “boys’ quarters” which typically feature two bedrooms but lack kitchen facilities. In addition, the area contains fully furnished executive houses, some of which rent for up to US$700 per month.

== The Old Abelempke ==
Old Abelemkpe, by contrast, is home to a predominantly middle- and lower-income population residing in compound houses large buildings divided into single- or two-room units occupied by multiple families. These homes generally lack internal kitchens, though small enclosed outdoor spaces are often used for cooking, and bathrooms are communal. Many of these older structures are undergoing gradual renovation to align with contemporary housing standards.

== Fire outbreak at Abelempke ==
A lot of wooden structures serving as warehouses have been destroyed by fierce fire that broke out on Wednesday, September 10, 2025, at Abelemkpe. According to 3news.com on September 11, 2025, the Ghana Fire Service reported that, three fire tenders were dispatched to the scene to prevent the blaze from spreading. They also stated that fire was under control.
