= Bubuashie =

Coordinates: 5°35′N 0°15′W

Bubiashie
- Town
- Location within Ghana
- Country: Ghana
- Region: Greater Accra Region
- District: Accra Metropolitan
- Time zone: GMT
  - Summer (DST): GMT

Bubiashie is a town in the Accra Metropolitan district, a district of the Greater Accra Region of Ghana.
