= Maamobi =

Coordinates: 5°35′N 0°12′W

- Interactive map of Maamobi
- Country: Ghana
- Region: Greater Accra Region

Maamobi is a town in the Greater Accra Region of Ghana. The town is known for the Accra Girls Secondary School. The school is a second cycle institution.
