= Victoriaborg, Accra =

Victoriaborg
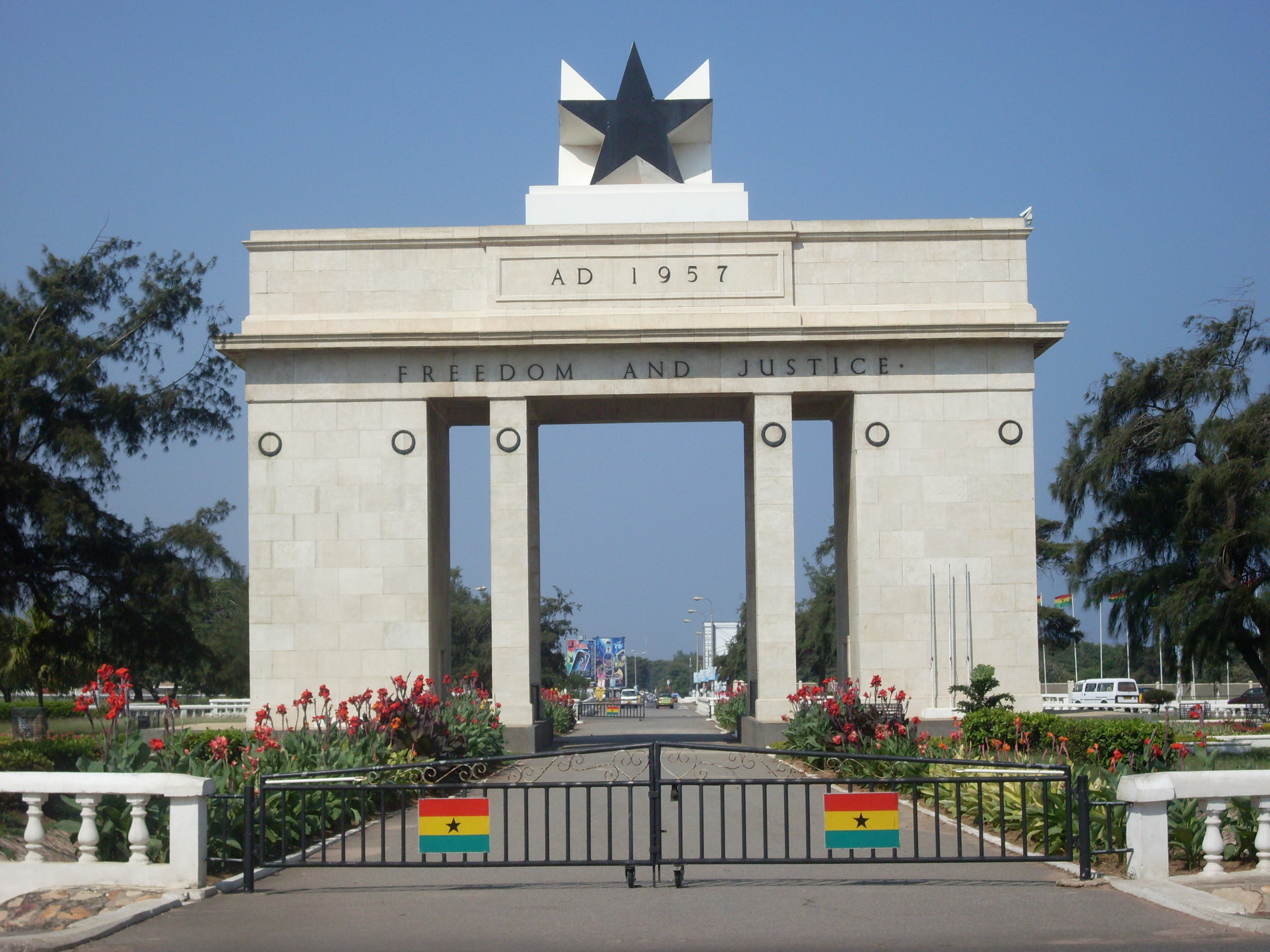
- Accra's Independence Arch
- Interactive map of Victoriaborg
- Location: Roughly: W: Kojo Thompson Road; N: Kinbu Road/Sir Charles Quist Street; S: Gulf of Guinea

Site notes
- Governing body: Accra Metropolitan Assembly

Victoriaborg is a neighbourhood of Accra, the capital of Ghana. Formed in the late nineteenth century as an exclusive European residential neighborhood, Victoriaborg was located to the east of Accra's city limits of the time, behind cliffs where there was reported to "always be a breeze". With its luxurious homes, race course, golf course, polo and cricket field, tennis courts, and racially segregated hospital, "Victoriaborg was like a piece of England grafted into the townscape of Accra."

As the city expanded, the suburban neighborhood of Victoriaborg was incorporated into the urban area. Following the independence of Ghana, the European CBD in Victoriaborg was nationalised in a symbolic sense with the siting of the Bank of Ghana, Ministries, Independence Square, and the headquarters of newly established national companies in the district.

Today, architecture in Victoriaborg ranges from elegant Georgian colonial buildings to glittering modern tower blocks reflecting its transition from a Victorian residential suburb to the modern business district it is today.

== Landmarks/Places of interest ==
- Supreme Court of Ghana
- Kwame Nkrumah Memorial Park
- Holy Trinity Cathedral
- Makola Shopping Mall
- National Hockey Pitch
- Independence Square
- Ohene Djan Stadium
- Bank of Ghana national headquarters
- State House
