= Odorkor =

- Town
- Location within Ghana
- Coordinates: 5.575°N 0.265°W
- Country: Ghana
- Region: Greater Accra Region
- District: Accra Metropolitan
- Time zone: GMT
  - Summer (DST): GMT

Odorkor is a town in the Accra Metropolitan district, a district of the Greater Accra Region of Ghana.
