= Efua Sutherland Children's Park =

Public children's park in Greater Accra Region of Ghana

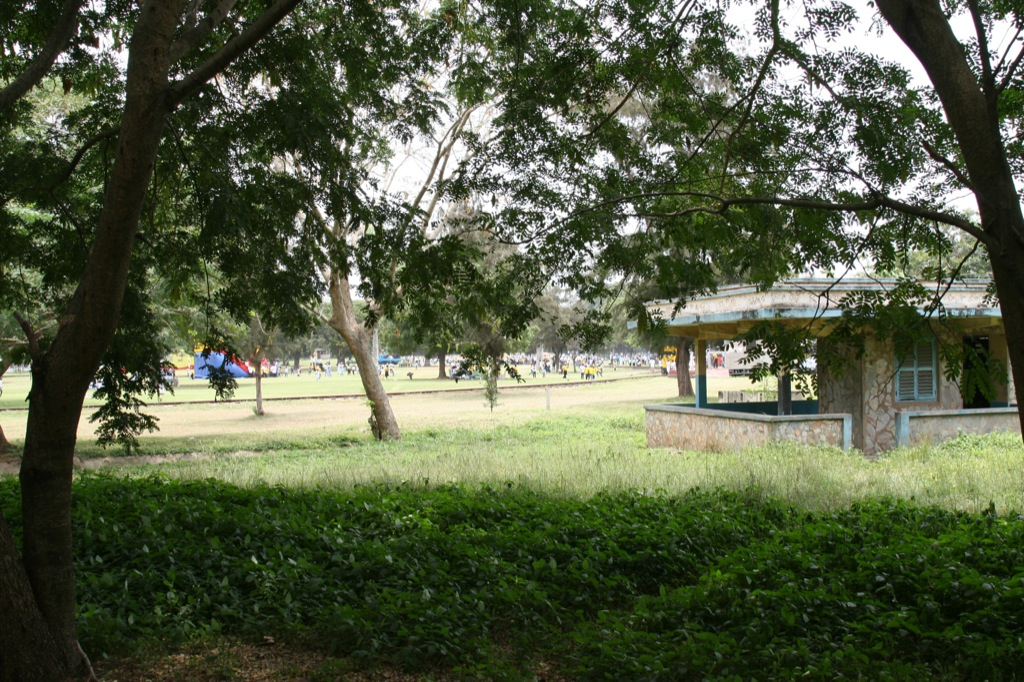
- Efua Sutherland Children's Park
- Interactive map of Efua Sutherland Children's Park
- Type: Children's park
- Location: Accra, Ghana
- Coordinates: 5.55565°N 0.19921°W
- Area: 14.83 acres (6.00 ha)
- Created: 1979; 47 years ago
- Operated by: Mmofra Foundation
- Status: Open all year

Efua Sutherland Children's Park (also known as Children's Park) is a 14.83-acre (0.0600 km^{2}) public park for children located opposite The National Theatre at West Ridge in the Greater Accra Region of Ghana. It was started in 1979, when it was known as "Accra Children's Park" or "Ridge Park", and it was later renamed after Ghanaian playwright and children's author, Efua Sutherland. As of 2019, the park has seen less development since its inception.
