= DBG =

DBG may refer to:

== Science and technology ==
- Dice before grind, an approach to wafer dicing in circuit manufacturing
- Dbg, a debugging function in the Windows Native API
- DBG, an internal command in the DR-DOS operating system
- DBG, an instruction in the ARM Cortex-M processor
- de Bruijn Graph, an approach to sequence assembly in computational biology
- Debug module, a type of background debug mode interface supported by certain microcontrollers, such as the HC08 or RS08
- Dynamic Backend Generator, a program written by Craig Dietrich

== Companies and organizations ==
=== Companies ===
- Deutsche Börse Group, an international exchange organization and market infrastructure provider for shares and other securities.
- Development Bank of Ghana, the government-owned development bank in Ghana
- Dalmia Group, an Indian conglomerate producing refractories, sugar, and cement
- Air Dabia, a defunct airline based in The Gambia from 1996 to 1998, by ICAO code
- Derichebourg, a French company providing environmental services
- Daybreak Game Company, an American videogame developer
- Digital Broadcasting Group, a company that syndicates the web series version of The LeBrons
- Digital Brand Group, a web-app development company bought by Australian marketing company Bastion Collective
- DBG Property Corporation, a company that in 1986 bought one of the Tudor City apartments in Manhattan, New York City, NY, US
- DBG Media, the publisher of the Our Time Press newspaper
- David Barton Gym, which Eric Owens (table tennis) had been on the sales team of

=== Other organizations ===
- Devon Bat Group, a bat conversation group based in Devon county, England, UK
- Bulgaria for Citizens Movement, a political party in Bulgaria
- German Soil Science Society, a German organization for soil scientists
- German Society for Plant Sciences, a German organization for plant scientists
- Dynamical Biomarkers Group, a team of biomedical scientists led by American physicist Chung-Kang Peng
- D-Block Boys, a drug ring in New Orleans, Louisiana, US
- German-Brazilian Society, which Carsten Schneider was a trustee of from 2013 to 2014
- Denver Botanic Gardens, a botanical garden in Denver, Colorado, US
- Deerwood Country Club, a gated community in Jacksonville, Florida, US
- Developmental Biology Group, a research group at the University of Georgia in Athens, Georgia, US; see Campuses of the University of Georgia#Paul D. Coverdell Center for Biomedical and Health Sciences

== Train stations or lines ==
- Dhoby Ghaut MRT station, a train station in the Museum Planning Area of Singapore
- Darbhanga Junction railway station, a train station in Darbhanga, Bihar, India
- Gütsch Funicular, a train line in Lucerne, Switzerland
- Mottisfont & Dunbridge railway station, a train station in Dunbridge, Hampshire county, England, UK

== Other uses ==
- Dogul Dogon, a language spoken in Mali, by ISO 639-3 code
- DBG, a supporting vocalist in the Seth Lakeman album Freedom Fields (2006)
