= Metro Mass Transit Company Limited =

Public transportation company in Ghana

Metro Mass Transit Limited

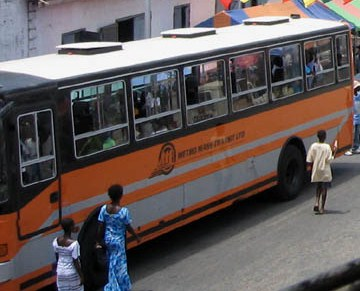
- Metro Mass Transit bus in Ghana
- Founded: 2003
- Headquarters: Ghana
- Service area: Ghana
- Service type: Bus rapid transit, public bus service and school bus service
- Alliance: Tata Starbus; Tata Motors
- Fuel type: Diesel, NGV (Trial)

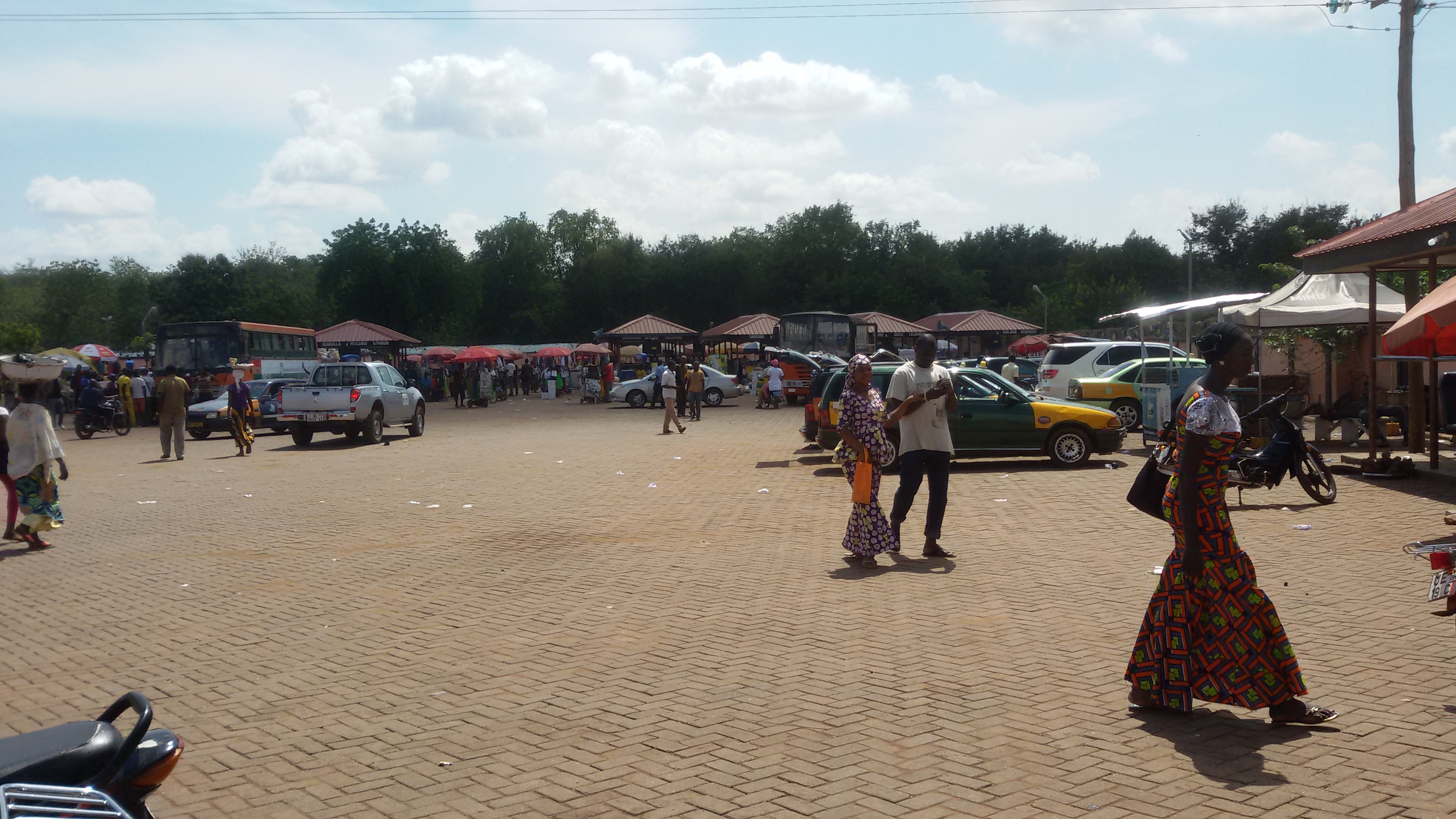
Metro Mass station in Tamale

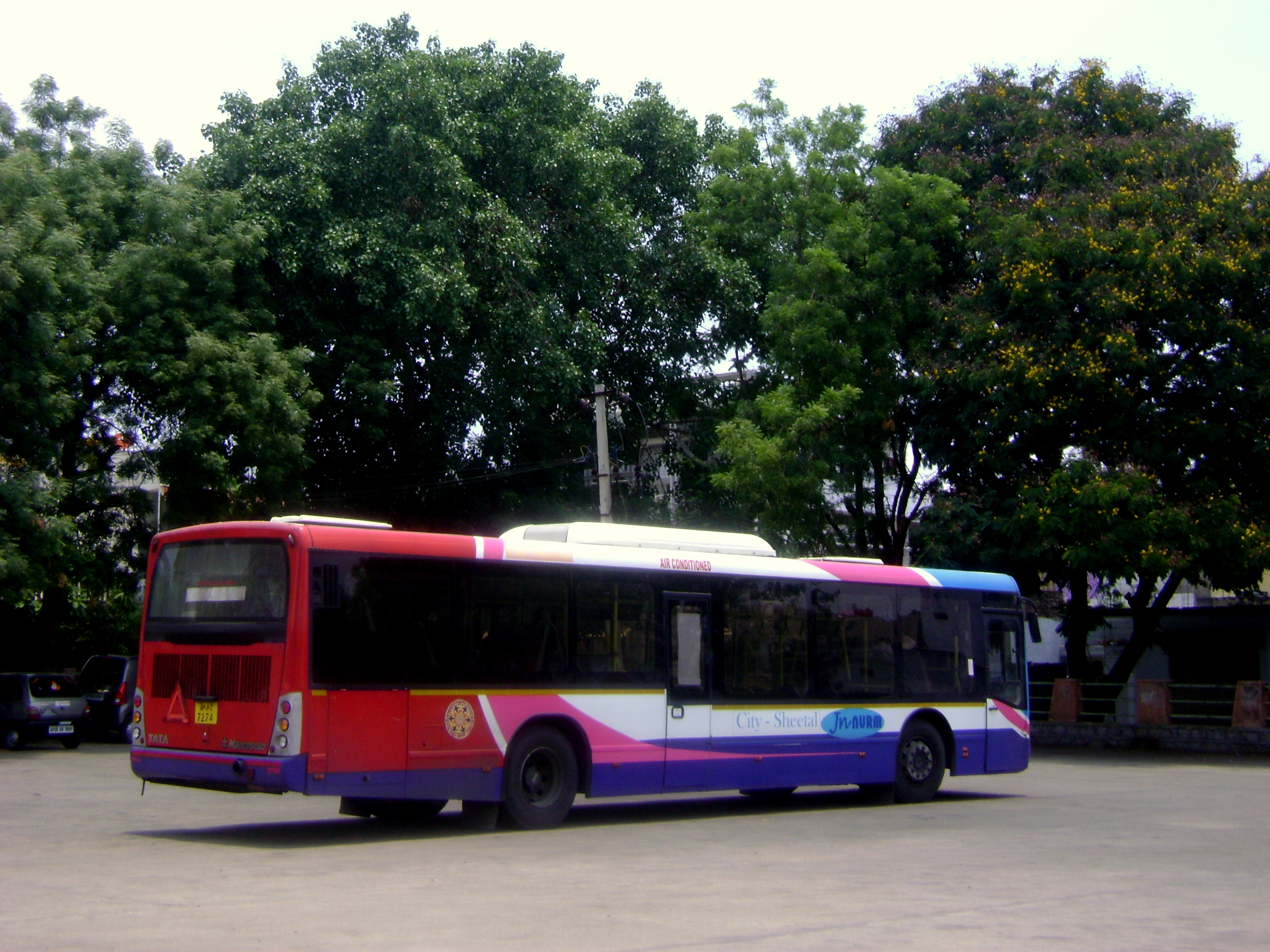
Metro Mass Transit Tata Starbus

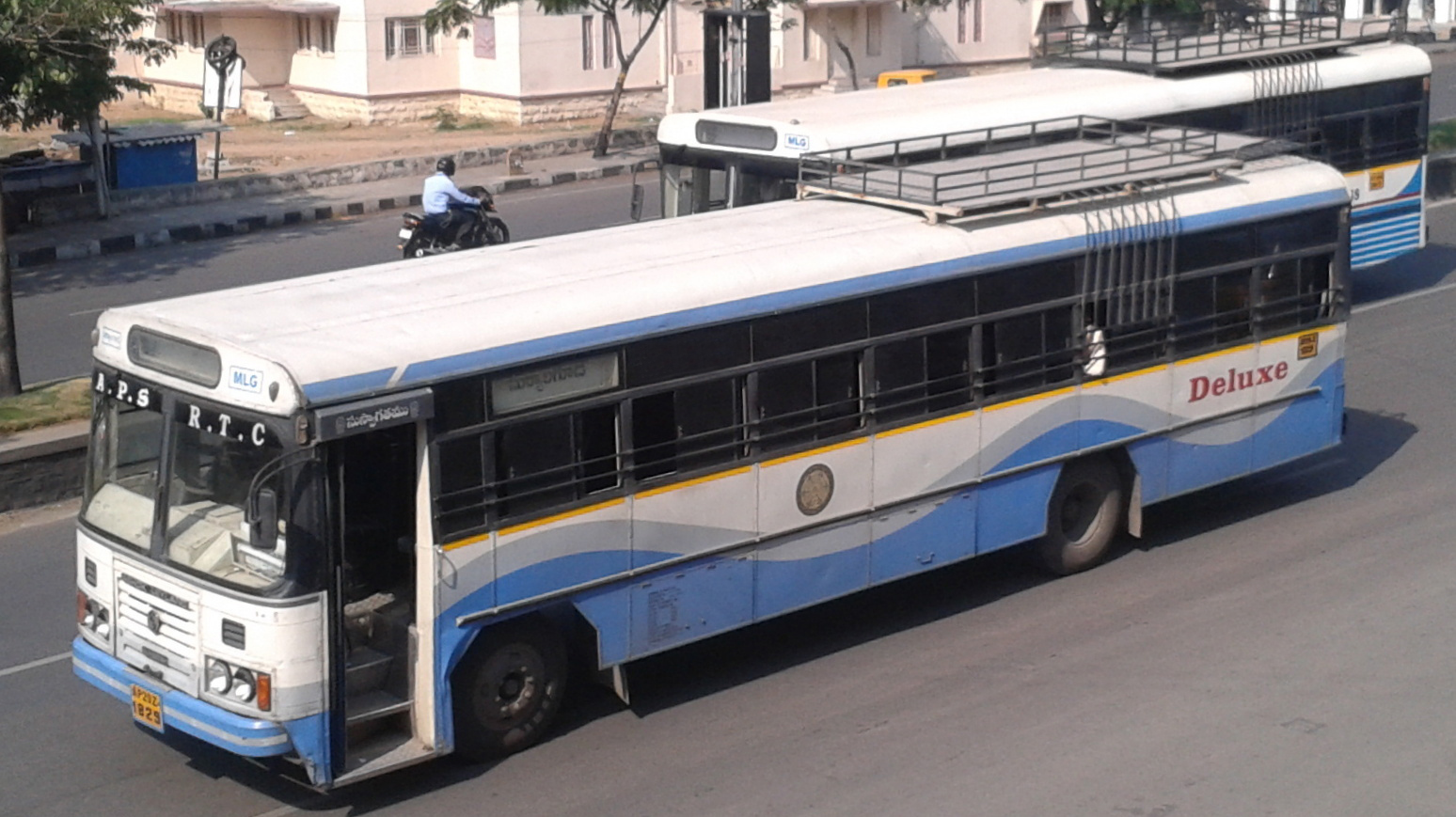
Metro Mass Transit Tata coach

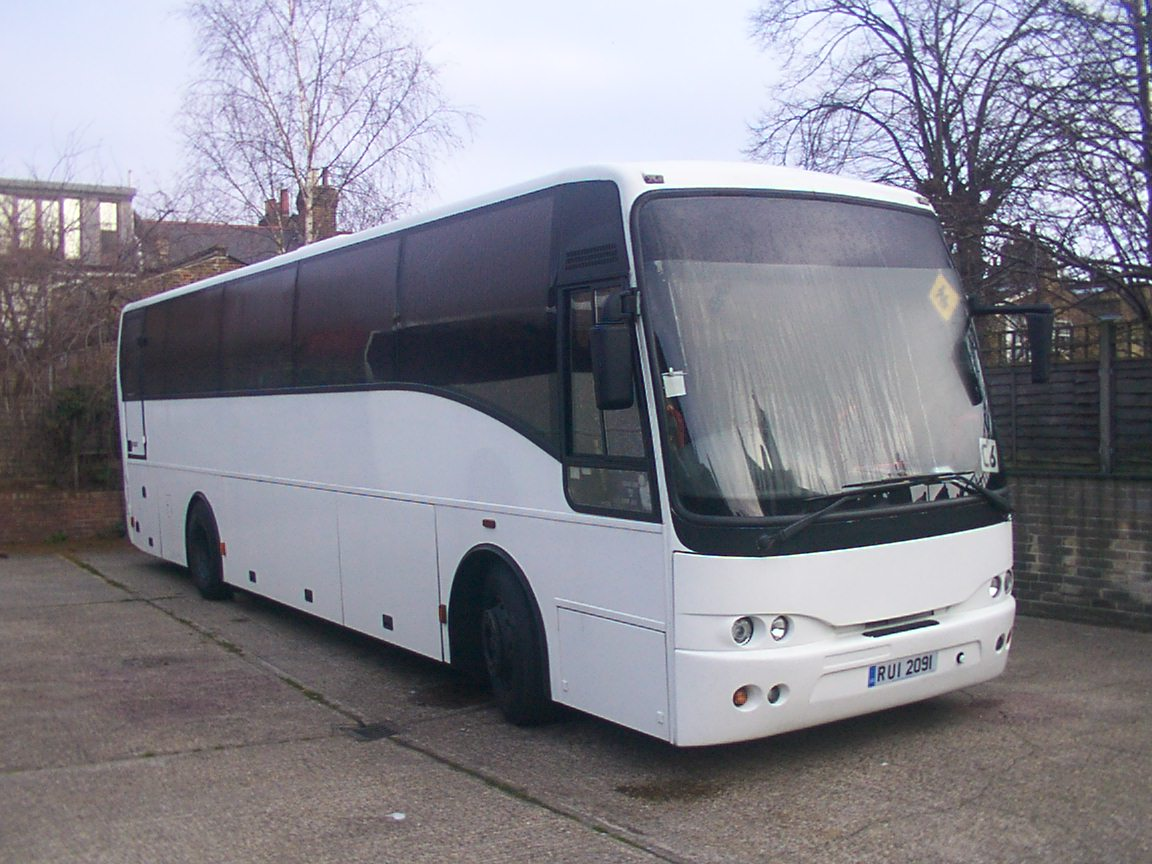
Metro Mass Transit Bus VDL Jonckheere

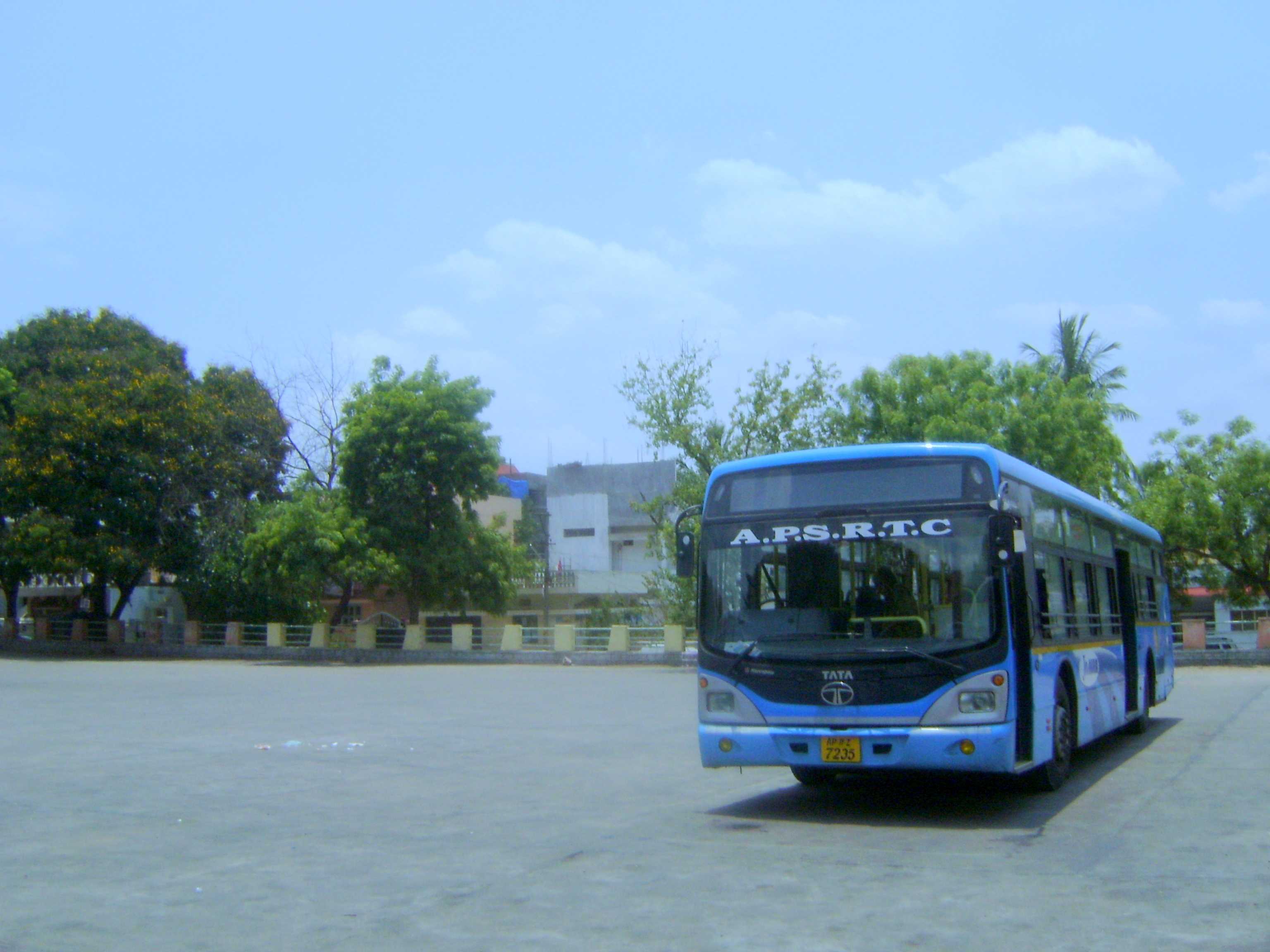
Metro Mass Transit Tata Marcopolo Bus

The Metro Mass Transit Limited is a public transportation company in Ghana. The company was set up to provide reliable and affordable means of transport for commuters within villages, towns, and cities as well as provide intercity movement.

== History ==
Public bus companies have operated in Ghana since the Omnibus Service Authority (OSA) started its operations in 1927. The OSA contributed a lot to the Ghanaian society in terms of public transport. However, OSA's assets were divested in 1995.

== Conception ==
Metro Mass Transit (MMT) arose from an idea from President John Kufuor who spoke of the need of introducing a mass transit bus system in the cities of Ghana at his inauguration speech on 7 January 2001. President Kufuor directed the re-introduction of public mass transport in the metropolitan and municipal areas to ensure the safe, affordable, efficient and reliable transport of commuters. Since then, the government has been actively promoting public mass transportation.

Metro Mass Transit Limited was officially incorporated in 2003. The shareholders include the SIC Insurance Company, National Investment Bank, Ghana Oil Company, Agriculture Development Bank, Prudential Bank Limited and Social Security and National Insurance Trust. These together have 55% shareholding. The Government of Ghana holds the remaining 45% shares.

== Alleged corruption cases ==
The managing director (MD) of Metro Mass Transit is alleged to have been caught in a secret audio recording, where he tried to bribe or pay off the whistle blower on how he the MD has sold vehicles that could be repaired as spoiled vehicles.

== Operational areas ==
Since the introduction of the Metro Mass Transit, the following areas have benefited from the service:

- Accra Metropolitan Area
- Tema Metropolitan Area
- Kumasi Metropolitan Area
- Sekondi-Takoradi Metropolitan Area
- Tamale Metropolitan Area
- New Juaben Municipal Area
- Sunyani Municipal Area
- Cape Coast Metropolitan Area
- Agona West Municipal Area
- Ho Municipal Area
- Wa Municipal Area
- Bolgatanga Municipal
- Birim Central Municipal Area

== Fleet ==
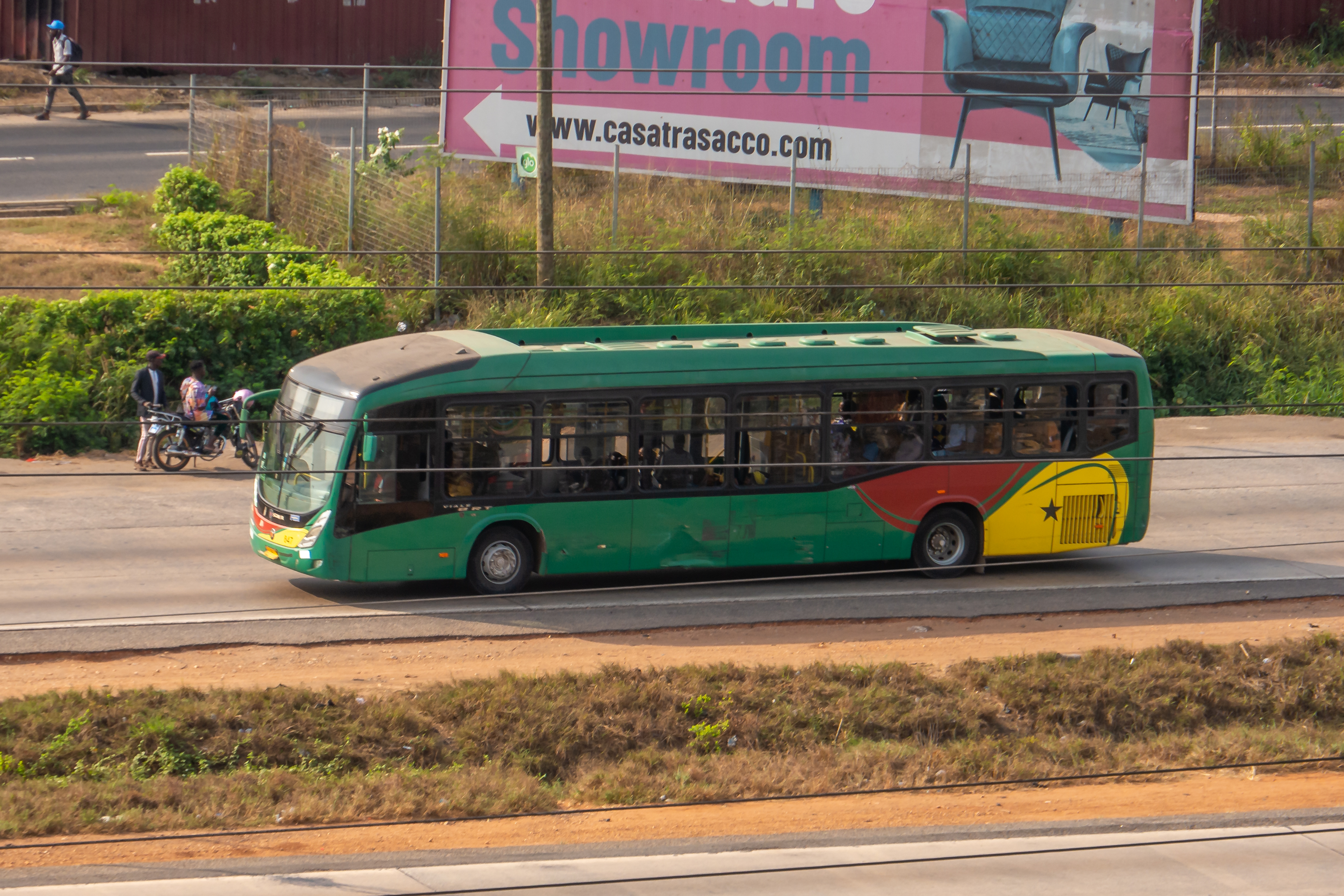
Metro Mass acquired 275 Marcopolo Viale BRT in 2016

MMT at the moment has a fleet of buses made up of Yaxing, DAF, Neoplan VDL, VDL Jonckheere, VDL Dutch, and Iveco buses. It is expected that the size of the fleet will reach 1,000 by the end of the year 2008.

MMT Fleets 2016
Young Man Coaches	Intracity (Accra / Tema)
Tata Tata Marcopolo	Intercity
DAF	Intercity
VDL Neoplan	Intercity
VDL Jonckheere	Intercity
Scania Marcopolo	Accra BRT

The Fiat-Iveco buses were donated by the Italian Government and helped a great deal during the pilot phase. These buses have played their part and are being phased out.

The Yaxing buses were manufactured in China and supported by the Ghana Government. On 13 April 2006, MMT received 150 Yaxing buses from the Ministry of Roads and Transport (MRT) to augment the MMT fleet. This brought the total number of Yaxing buses received to 400 and the total operational MMT fleet to over 600. As of early 2016 all Yaxing buses have been scrapped and are no longer in service.

All DAF & VDL buses have been financed through an ORET Grant agreement between the Dutch Government and Ghana. Thirty-five percent of the value is a gift of the Dutch Government whilst 65% has been provided as a loan. All DAF Neoplaan & VDL Neoplan buses are manufactured at the Neoplan factory in Kumasi.

== Ridership ==
MMT carried almost 40 million passengers nationwide from January to October 2007 over 12,000,000 kilometres (7,500,000 mi). MMT buses have carried 36,456,300 passengers nationwide and have given 3,724,644 school children free ride.

== Job creations ==
MMT has grown to be one of the major employers in Ghana. MMT's current staff strength of around 2,474 is expected to exceed 3000 by the end of 2008 with the arrival of about 258 buses. Janitorial services, security, bus washing and cleaning are outsourced to third parties providing employment for additional 500 persons. On account of the construction of the buses in Kumasi, several indirect jobs have been created in the manufacturing sector. In general productivity of the workforce in Ghana would increase, since MMT can offer fast and reliable transport from home to the workplace. Moreover, the operations of MMT would empower the Ghanaian community by making job, shop, school and healthcare better accessible.

== Operational issues ==
A pilot Bus Rapid Transit project in Accra, connecting Adenta with the Central Business District and the Kwame Nkrumah Circle, carrying over 20,000 passengers a day commenced in September 2005. The buses operate every 15 minutes and tickets are sold in advance.

== Awards ==
In the year 2013, MMT won the International Transport Awards. It also won the overall award in the National Road Safety awards scheme in October 2013 in the Eastern Region of Ghana.
