= Development Bank Ghana =

State-owned development finance institution in Ghana

- Type: State-owned enterprise
- Industry: Development finance
- Founded: 2020
- Headquarters: Accra Financial Centre, Liberia Road, Accra, Ghana
- Key people: Albert Kobina Essien (board chair); Randolph Nsor-Ambala (chief executive officer)
- Products: Wholesale loans, partial credit guarantees
- Net income: GH₵129.1 million (2025)
- Owner: Government of Ghana
- Website: www.dbg.com.gh

Development Bank Ghana (DBG), incorporated as Development Bank Ghana LTD, is a state-owned development finance institution in Ghana. It operates as a wholesale bank, providing long-term funding through eligible financial institutions, known as participating financial institutions (PFIs), which on-lend to micro, small and medium enterprises (MSMEs) and small corporates.

DBG is owned by the Government of Ghana and was established with funding support from development partners: a US$250 million International Development Association credit approved by the World Bank in October 2020, a €170 million loan facility agreed with the European Investment Bank in May 2021, a US$40 million African Development Fund grant approved by the African Development Bank Group in November 2021, and a €46.5 million subordinated loan from KfW. Its focus sectors include agribusiness value chains, manufacturing, information and communications technology, tourism and housing. Between its launch in June 2022 and mid-2026, the bank disbursed about GH₵2.5 billion to approximately 1,000 businesses across all sixteen regions of Ghana. As at 31 December 2025, the bank reported total assets of GH₵4.64 billion and total equity of GH₵1.76 billion.

== History ==
DBG was conceived in 2017 and incorporated in 2020 as part of the Government of Ghana's plan for a national development bank to complement two existing state-owned financial institutions, the Agricultural Development Bank and the National Investment Bank, which were considered not to provide sufficient long-term lending at affordable rates to small businesses in the agriculture value chain, manufacturing and high-value services. The bank received its licence from the Bank of Ghana in 2021 and was formally launched by President Nana Akufo-Addo on 14 June 2022.

At launch, the bank stated an aim of lending US$600 million to small businesses within its first one to two years of operation. Four commercial banks were accredited as participating financial institutions at launch: CalBank, Consolidated Bank Ghana, GCB Bank and Fidelity Bank Ghana.

By February 2023, the bank had disbursed about GH₵245 million to its participating financial institutions for on-lending to small and medium enterprises. During 2023, DBG disbursed GH₵623 million and expanded its network to ten participating financial institutions, including three microfinance institutions. By July 2026, cumulative disbursements had reached about GH₵2.5 billion to approximately 1,000 businesses across all sixteen regions of Ghana, with more than half of the beneficiary businesses being women-led enterprises.

In September 2025, following an independent audit commissioned by the Ministry of Finance, the government announced governance reforms at DBG, including the reconstitution of the board of directors.

== Operations ==
DBG does not lend directly to businesses. It operates a wholesale financing model, providing long to medium-term funding to eligible participating financial institutions, including commercial banks, rural and community banks, savings and loans companies and microfinance institutions, for on-lending to micro, small and medium enterprises in sectors including manufacturing, agribusiness, information and communications technology and high-value services. Its lending is directed at businesses with fewer than 100 employees. The bank also provides guarantee finance through participating financial institutions to de-risk lending to MSMEs, through its wholly owned subsidiary DBG Guarantee LTD, a credit guarantee development finance institution.

The bank's stated objectives include serving Ghana's industrial and export strategies, encouraging job creation and business expansion, and raising long-term funds from local and international capital markets and international financial institutions on the strength of its own balance sheet. Its focus sectors are off-farm agribusiness and farm value-chain activities, manufacturing, information and communications technology and software, tourism, and housing. At its launch, the bank set an objective of increasing the proportion of bank lending advanced to small businesses from 9 per cent in 2022 to 15 per cent by 2024.

== Finances ==
At its launch in June 2022, DBG reported total assets of approximately US$800 million and shareholders' equity of US$250 million. For the year ended 31 December 2025, the bank reported group total assets of GH₵4.64 billion, up from GH₵4.45 billion in 2024, and total equity of GH₵1.76 billion, including stated capital of GH₵1.40 billion. Group profit for the year was GH₵129.1 million, up from GH₵17.8 million in 2024, and the bank's capital adequacy ratio stood at 59.4 per cent. No dividend was recommended for 2025.

== Sustainability ==
DBG aligns its operations with the United Nations Sustainable Development Goals, in particular SDG 5 (gender equality), SDG 9 (industry, innovation and infrastructure), SDG 13 (climate action) and SDG 17 (partnerships for the goals). The bank has initiated programmes to support green projects as part of an environmental, social and governance focus, and a project supporting Ghana's nationally determined contributions under the Paris Agreement has been in preparation with KfW.

== Partnerships ==
DBG works with the Ghana Incentive-Based Risk-Sharing System for Agricultural Lending (GIRSAL) to support agricultural financing. The bank also runs training programmes in agricultural finance for staff of financial institutions, covering commercial banks, rural and community banks, savings and loans companies and microfinance institutions.

== Governance ==
=== Chief executive ===
Kwamina Bentsi Enchill Duker was appointed as DBG's first chief executive officer in January 2022 and also served as a member of the board of directors. Randolph Nsor-Ambala was appointed chief executive officer with effect from 21 January 2025, succeeding Duker.

=== Board of directors ===
The bank's inaugural seven-member board, appointed in January 2022, was chaired by Yaw Ansu and included Kwamina Duker as chief executive officer, with Stephan Leudesdorff, Charles Boamah, Rosemary Yeboah, Mary Boakye, Yaw Nsarkoh and Nora Bannerman-Abbott as non-executive directors. The board was reconstituted following the governance reforms announced in September 2025.

As of 2026, DBG's board of directors consisted of:

- Albert Kobina Essien (board chair)
- Nnenna Nwabufo (independent non-executive director)
- Felix Kwesi Duku (independent non-executive director)
- Kweku Bedu-Addo (independent non-executive director)
- Farida Bedwei (independent non-executive director)
- Razak A. Adam (independent non-executive director)
- Ato Brown (independent non-executive director)
- Randolph Nsor-Ambala (chief executive officer)

=== Executive management ===
As of 2026, DBG's executive management comprised:

- Randolph Nsor-Ambala, chief executive officer
- John Kwame Mensah Zigah, deputy chief executive officer, operations
- Michael Mensah-Baah, deputy chief executive officer, investment
- Pamela Obiri Ankoh, chief risk officer
- Eric Osei-Assibey, chief economist
- Kwasi Osei-Bobie, chief finance officer
- Jocelyn Emma Ackon, director, human capital and administration
- Frederick Ampomah-Amaning, chief internal auditor
- Frank Owusu Nsafoah Jr., chief compliance and ethics officer
- Peninnah Abena Agyakwaa Asah, company secretary

== See also ==
- List of banks in Ghana
- Economy of Ghana
- Bank of Ghana
