= Tweneboa Kodua Fokuo =

Ghanaian politician (born 1977)

Hon. Tweneboa Kodua Fokuo MP

Member of the Ghana Parliament for Manso Nkwanta
- Incumbent
- Assumed office 7 January 2025
- Preceded by: George Takyi
- President: John Dramani Mahama
- Vice President: Jane Naana Opoku-Agyemang

Personal details
- Born: 28 July 1976 (age 50) Pakyi No. 1, Ashanti Region, Ghana
- Party: New Patriotic Party
- Education: University of Wales (MBA); KNUST (BSc); IFS School of Finance UK
- Occupation: Politician
- Profession: Banker

Tweneboa Kodua Fokuo (born August 12, 1977) is a Ghanaian politician and entrepreneur who serves as the Member of Parliament for the Manso Nkwanta constituency in the Ashanti Region. He represents the New Patriotic Party in the Ninth Parliament of the Fourth Republic of Ghana.

== Early life and education ==
Fokuo was born in Pakyi No. 1, a town in the Amansie West District of the Ashanti Region, on July 28, 1976. He completed a Bachelor of Science in Natural Resources Management at Kwame Nkrumah University of Science and Technology (KNUST) in July 2001. He then earned an MBA in Finance from the University of Wales in May 2004, followed by an Advanced Commercial Credit Risk Management Certificate from the IFS School of Finance, UK, in July 2009.

== Career ==
Fokuo started his career in banking and risk management. He served as Assistant Vice President at Barclays Bank Ghana (now Absa Bank Ghana), and later became head of credit risk at First National Bank Ghana. In 2019, he joined the National Investment Bank (NIB) as deputy managing director, later becoming the managing director.

=== Politics ===
In the December 2024 general elections, Fokuo was elected MP for Manso Nkwanta on the ticket of the NPP, taking over from George Kwabena Obeng Takyi. He serves on Parliament's Employment, Labour Relations and Pensions Committee and the Economy and Development Committee.
