= Martin Gerzabek =

Austrian ecologist and soil scientist

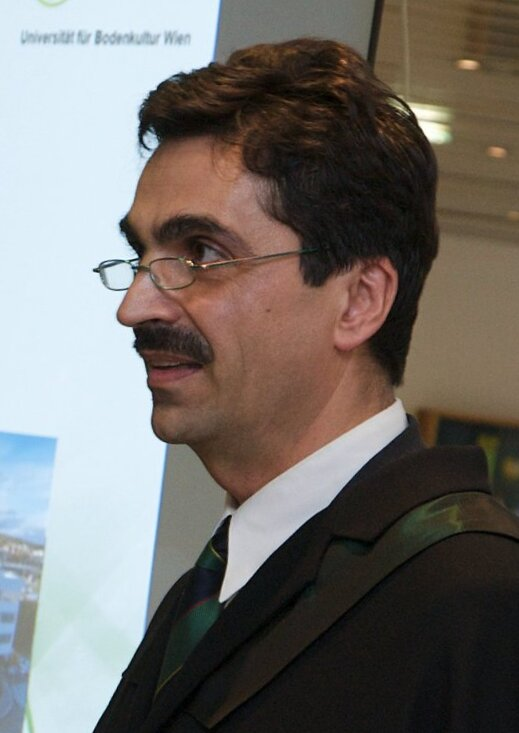
Martin Gerzabek, 2010.

Martin Hubert Gerzabek (born June 9, 1961 in Vienna, Austria) is an Austrian ecologist and soil scientist. He is a professor of ecotoxicology and isotope application and was rector of BOKU, the University of Natural Resources and Life Sciences, Vienna from 2010 to 2018.

== Life ==
Gerzabek studied agriculture and plant production at BOKU - University of Natural Resources and Life Sciences Vienna, and graduated as a “Diplom Ingenieur” in 1985. Two years later, having completed his dissertation work titled: Plant Availability of Magnesium (German: Die Pflanzenverfügbarkeit von Magnesium) he graduated as a “Dr. nat. Techn.”, a doctorate in natural and technological sciences, also at the University of Natural Resources and Life Sciences, Vienna. From 1984 to 1993, Gerzabek worked as a research assistant at the Research Center Seibersdorf (now AIT, Austrian Institute of Technology) at their Institute of Agriculture as head of the soil research work group. After completing his habilitation in the field of Soil Sciences based on his work about soil contaminants' behaviour, he was asked to head the agricultural research area at AIT. From 1997 to 2003, he then headed the environmental research department. In 2001, he was appointed to the newly created Chair for Environmental Toxicology and Isotope Application at the Institute for Soil Research, Department of Forest and Soil Science at the University of Natural Resources and Life Sciences, Vienna. From October 2003 to January 2010, Gerzabek served as Vice President for Research at the University of Natural Resources and Life Sciences, Vienna, from January 2009 to January 2010 as Managing Director, and from February 2010 to January 2018 he has been rector of the said university. He is the founding president of the Network of Life Sciences Universities of Central and South Eastern Europe (ICA-CASEE) since 2010 and from 2010 to 2016 he was vice-president of ICA, the European Association of Life Science Universities. In 2011, he was vice-president and in 2012 became president of the Danube Rectors' Conference.

== Societies ==
He was a member of the Board of the Euroleague for Life Sciences (ELLS), which he chaired from 2009 to 2010. In 2009, Gerzabek was appointed corresponding member and 2023 full member to the mathematics and natural sciences division in the Austrian Academy of Sciences. In addition, he has been vice president of the AAER (Austrian Association for Agricultural Research) from 2009 to 2018.

In June 2017 Hubert Hasenauer was elected next rector of the University of Natural Resources and Life Sciences; he succeeded Martin Gerzabek in February 2018. Today Gerzabek is president of the Christian Doppler Research Association since 2019 <https://www.cdg.ac.at/en/about-us/organisation/cdg-executive-board>. He followed Prof. Reinhard Kögerler in this function.

== Research and publication foci ==
- Radioecology: in particular, study of the mobility of radionuclides in the system “soil and plant”; modeling the transfer paths to humans;
- Organic soil composition and humus chemistry: Characterization of humic substance systems via physical and chemical methods. How soil development and climate change affects humus dynamics and soil functions;
- Behaviour of heavy metals, radionuclides and organic contaminants in soil; methods of remediation of contaminated sites.

== Publications ==
Martin Gerzabek is the author and co-author of about 555 scientific publications, approx. 286 are articles in peer-reviewed soil and environmental science journals, 61 book contributions, 5 books, and numerous conference proceedings.

Examples of recent publications:

- With I. Djukic, F. Zehetner und A. Mentler: Microbial community composition and activity in different Alpine vegetation zones. In: SOIL BIOL BIOCHEM. 42(2), 2010, S. 155–161.
- With F. Strebl, M. Tulipan und S. Schwarz: Quantification of organic carbon pools for Austria's agricultural soils using a soil information system. In: Canadian J Soil Science. 85, 2005, S. 491–498.
- With R. S. Antil, I. Kögel-Knabner, H. Knicker, H. Kirchmann und G. Haberhauer: How are soil use and management reflected by soil organic matter characteristics: a spectroscopic approach. In: European Journal of Soil Science. 57, 2006, S. 485–494.
- With M. Tatzber, M. Stemmer, H. Spiegel, C. Katzlberger, F. Zehetner, G. Haberhauer, K. Roth und E. Garcia-Garcia: Decomposition of Carbon-14-Labeled Organic Amendments and Humic Acids in a Long-Term Field Experiment. In: SOIL SCI SOC AMER J. 73(3), 2009, S. 744–750.
- With D. Tunega, G. Haberhauer und H. Lischka: Formation of 2,4-D complexes on montmorillonites - an ab initio molecular dynamics study. In: EUR J SOIL SCI. 58, 2007, S. 680–691.
- With D. Tunega, G. Haberhauer, K. U. Totsche und H. Lischka: Model study on sorption of polycyclic aromatic hydrocarbons to goethite. In: J COLLOID INTERFACE SCI. 330(1), 2009, S. 244–249.
- With F. Zehetner und G. J. Lair: Rapid carbon accretion and organic matter pool stabilization in riverine floodplain soils. In: GLOBAL BIOGEOCHEM CYCLE. 23, 2009, GB4004
- Global soil use in biomass production: opportunities and challenges of ecological and sustainable intensification in agriculture. In: Die Bodenkultur. 65, 2014, S. 5–15.
- With A. Sündermann, R. Solc, D. Tunega, G. Haberhauer und C. Oostenbrink: Vienna Soil-Organic-Matter Modeler - Generating condensed-phase models of humid substances. In: Journal of Molecular Graphics and Modeling. 62, 2015, S. 253–261.
- With Tatzber, M., Stemmer, M., Spiegel, H., Katzlberger, C., Landstetter, C., Haberhauer, G. (2012): 14C-labeled organic amendments: Characterization in different particle size fractions and humic acids in a long-term field experiment. Geoderma 177-178, 39-48
- With Waldner, G., Friesl-Hanl, W., Haberhauer, G. (2012): Differences in sorption behavior of the herbicide 4-chloro-2-methylphenoxyacetic acid on artificial soils as a function of soil pre-aging. Journal of Soils and Sediments 12(8), 1292-1298.
- With Djukic, I, Zehetner, F, Watzinger, A, Horacek, M. (2013): In situ carbon turnover dynamics and the role of soil microorganisms therein: a climate warming study in an Alpine ecosystem. FEMS MICROBIOLOGY ECOLOGY 83/1, 112-124.
- With Sündermann, A., Solc, R., Tunega, D., Haberhauer, G., Oostenbrink, C. (2015): Vienna Soil-Organic-Matter Modeler – Generating condensed-phase models of humic substances. Journal of Molecular Graphics and Modelling 62, 253-261
- With Schuhmann, A., Gans, O., Weiss, S., Tank, J., Klammler, G., Haberhauer, G. (2106): A long-term lysimeter experiment to investigate the environmental dispersion of the herbicide chloridazon and its metabolites—comparison of lysimeter types. J Soils and Sediments 16(3), 1032-1045.
- With Candra, I N., Ottner, F., Tintner, J., Wriessnig, K., Zehetner, F. (2019): Weathering and soil formation in rhyolitic tephra along a moisture gradient on Alcedo Volcano, Galápagos. Geoderma 343, 215–225
- With Galicia-Acdrés, E., Oostenbrink, C., Tunega, D. (2021): On the adsorption mechanism of humic substances on kaolinite and their microscopic structure. Minerals 11, 1138. https://doi.org/10.3390/min11101138
- With Aquino, A.J.A., Balboa, Y.I.E., Galicia-Andrés, E., Grancic, P., Oostenbrink, C., Petrov, D., Tunega, D. (2022): A contribution of molecular modeling to supramolecular structures in soil organic matter. J. Plant Nutr. Soil Sci. 185, 44-59.
- With Stoops, G., Ottner, F., Wang, S.-L., Huang, L.-S., Zehetner, F. (2023). The evolution of soil microstructure and micromineralogy along a soil age gradient on the Galápagos Islands (Ecuador). Geoderma Regional 32, e00609, 11p.
- With Poch, R.M.; Álvarez, D., Ploszczanski, L., Zehetner, F. (2025). Strong differences in pedogenesis on lava vs. scoria along a hydroclimatic gradient on Santa Cruz Island/Galápagos archipelago (Ecuador) – Insights from micromorphology. Spanish Journal of Soil Science 15:14219. doi: 10.3389/sjss.2025.14219

== Awards ==
In 2015, Gerzabek was awarded the Grand Decoration of Honor in Gold for Services to the Republic of Austria. In 2018, Gerzabek was awarded the Grand Decoration of Honor in Gold for Services to the Federal Republic of Lower Austria <https://de.wikipedia.org/wiki/Liste_von_Tr%C3%A4gern_des_Ehrenzeichens_f%C3%BCr_Verdienste_um_das_Bundesland_Nieder%C3%B6sterreich#Goldenes_Komturkreuz_des_Ehrenzeichens_f%C3%BCr_Verdienste_um_das_Bundesland_Nieder%C3%B6sterreich>.

Gerzabek has received several awards for his scientific work, for example, the "Pro Merito" badge of honour in gold for outstanding achievements regarding radiation protection in 2004. In 2006, he received the honorary membership of the Austrian Soil Science Association for outstanding achievements in soil science in Austria and in 2011, the Emil Ramann Medal of the German Soil Science Society. Furthermore, in 2011, Gerzabek received three honorary doctorates: from the Georgian State Agrarian University in Tbilisi, the Czech University of Life Sciences Prague and the University of Agricultural Sciences and Veterinary Medicine of Cluj-Napoca.

In 2012, he was awarded an honorary doctorate by the Ion Ionescu de la Brad University of Agricultural Sciences and Veterinary Medicine of Iași in Romania. In 2015, he was elected to the Academia Europaea and to the German Academy of Engineering (acatech) and was awarded the Decoration of Honour in Gold for Services to the Republic of Austria by the Federal Republic of Austria. Since 2016, Gerzabek is Honorary Member of the IUSS (International Union of Soil Sciences). In 2023 he received the award of Excellence for Lifetime Achievements of ICA (European Association of Life Science Universities). In 2024 he was elected as honory member of Academia Romana.
