= Joseph Albert Quarm =

Ghanaian politician (born 1975)

Hon. Prof. Joseph Albert Quarm

Member of Parliament for Manso Nkwanta Constituency
- In office 7 January 2017 – 6 January 2021

Personal details
- Born: Joseph Albert Quarm; 7 May 1975 (age 51) Manso Nsiana, Ghana
- Party: New Patriotic Party
- Occupation: Politician
- Profession: Land Advocate, Research Scientist and Mining Consultant

Joseph Albert Quarm popularly known as Prof. Quarm is a Ghanaian politician and member of the Seventh Parliament of the Fourth Republic of Ghana representing the Manso-Nkwanta Constituency in the Ashanti Region on the ticket of the New Patriotic Party.

== Early life and education ==
Quarm was born on 7 May 1975 and hails from Manso Nsiana in the Ashanti Region of Ghana. He holds BSc, MPhil and PhD degrees in Biological Sciences from the Kwame Nkrumah University of Science and Technology, KNUST.

== Personal life ==
Quarm is a Christian.

== Career ==
Quarm was a tutor in Vicande School from 1996 to 1998. He also worked at Central Gold African Ghana Limited as a part-time Environmental Officer in 2007. He was also the CEO of Prof Quarm Publications Limited from 1995 to 2016 as well as the CEO of Prof Quarm Hospital Complex from 2012 to 2016, CEO of Prof Quarm Football Club and CEO of Prof Quarm Construction Limited. He is a land reclamation expert, land advocate, research scientist and mining consultant.

On 7 July 2020, he was appointed as the new Chairman of the Kwame Nkrumah University of Science and Technology (KNUST) Foundation by the University Council for a tenure of 2 years.

== Philanthropy ==
On Tuesday, 1 December 2020, the President of the Republic of Ghana, H. E. Nana Addo Darkwa Akufo-Addo commissioned a 100-bed Prof. Quarm hospital facility in Manso Nsiana in the Amansie West District of the Ashanti region.

Educational materials worth ¢400,000 were donated to the Otumfour Osei Tutu II Foundation to improve quality education by Prof. Quarm Publications in June 2022.

== Politics ==
Quarm is a member of the New Patriotic Party and is the former member of parliament for Manso Nkwanta Constituency in the Ashanti Region. In June 2015, he won the NPP primaries against Grace Addo who was the Member of Parliament of Manso Nkwanta Constituency. In the 2016 Ghanaian general election, Quarm won the parliamentary seat with 32,140 votes making 83.26% of the total votes cast, whilst the NDC parliamentary aspirant Alex Kwame Bonsu had 5,503 votes making 14.26% of the total votes cast.

In June 2020 during the New Patriotic Party (NPP) parliamentary primaries, he lost the party ticket to retain his seat in the upcoming General elections in December 2020 despite being the incumbent Member of Parliament for Manso Nkwanta Constituency.

== Galamsey ==
When President Nana Addo Darkwa Akufo-Addo instituted a ban on illegal mining (galamsey) across the country, Quarm threw his support for the government initiative stating the need to protect water bodies and arable lands despite the President's action affecting residents of Amansie West District of the Manso Nkwanta Constituency in the Ashanti region. He further reiterated that, he lost his party primaries due to his fight against illegal mining (galamsey) in his constituency.

In a 36-page document by former Minister for Environment, Science and Technology on illegal small-scale mining in Ghana also known as galamsey, Quarm was named as being involved in illegal small-scale mining alongside other government officials. The office of the Presidency in a press statement has indicated that, the 36-page document is full of hearsay and there was no evidence submitted to prove the allegations. Therefore, they cannot investigate these claims and hearsay.

Agya Owusu accused Quarm of selling a mining concession to him which later proved to be illegal due to the mining site being close to a river. Military officers raided Agya Owusu's site and burnt his equipment despite having a mining concession. He was also accused by the Ashanti District of the Ghana National Association of Small Scale Miners for taking over an earmarked area for a community mining project by using his influence as a board member of the Minerals Commission. On 21 April 2023 in an interview on JoyFM's Midday news, Quarm refuted claims that he has mining concessions in his name and that, his image is being tarnished.

In June 2023, Quarm sued Prof. Frimpong-Boateng for defamation seeking an injunction restraining him from making further utterances about his allegations.

== Honor ==
In March 2022, Quarm was honored by the West Africa International Press Limited with the Heroes of Distinction Award.

== Controversy ==
In 2016, Quarm stated in his book ‘Natural Science for Primary Schools – Pupil’s Book 1,’ that the human head is used for carrying loads. He was criticized by Kofi Bentil, Vice President of IMANI Ghana and social media users who called for the withdrawal of the books from basic schools. The Ministry of Education released a statement for schools in Ghana not to patronize the book.
