= HFC Bank =

HFC Bank may refer to:

- HFC Bank, a brand of HSBC Finance, a financial services company
- HFC, a subsidiary of Republic Bank Ghana Limited
