= George Takyi =

Ghanaian politician (born 1965)

Hon. George Takyi MP
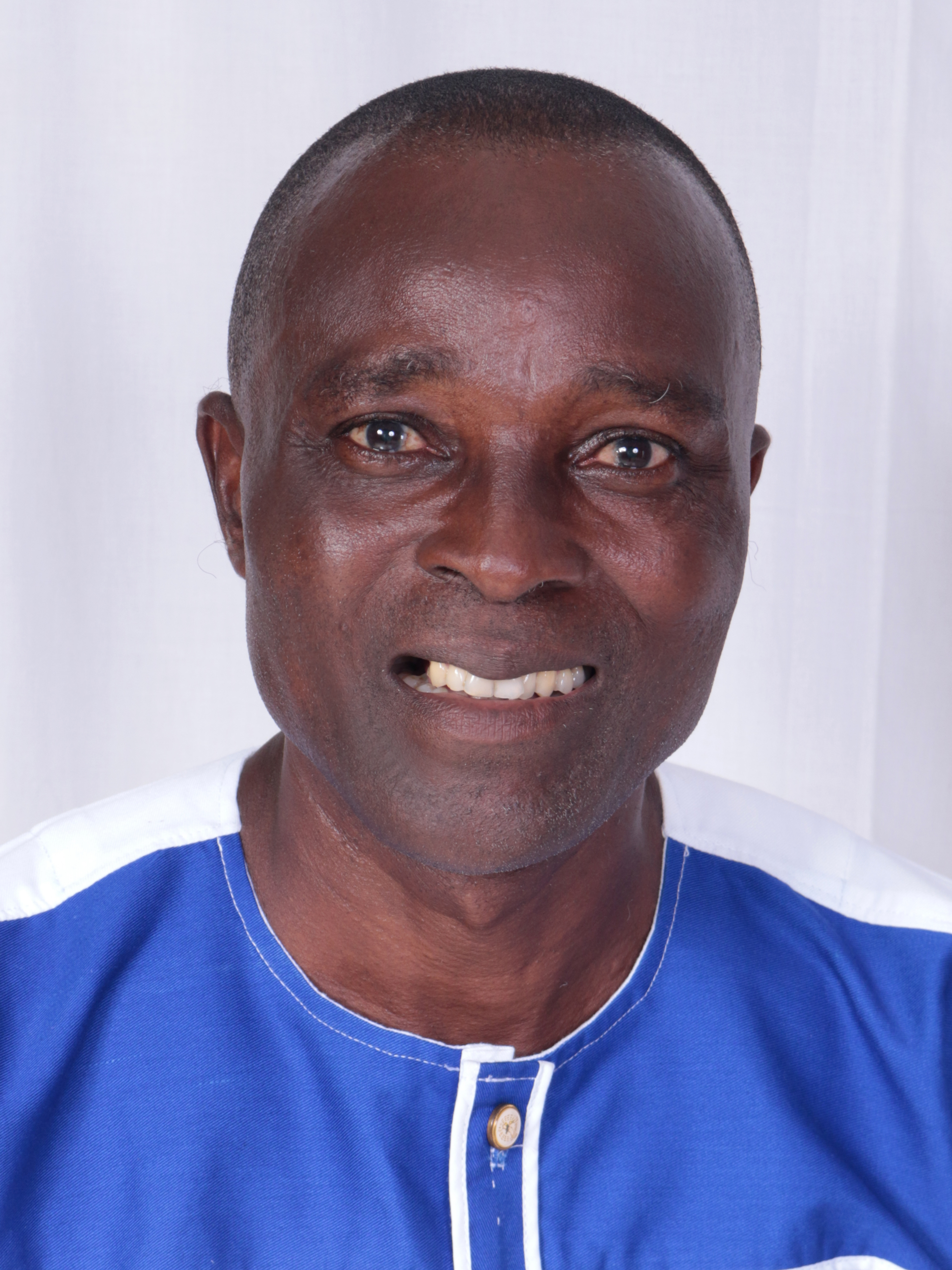

Member of Parliament for Manso Nkwanta Constituency
- In office 7 January 2021 – 6 January 2025
- Succeeded by: Tweneboa Kodua Fokuo

Personal details
- Born: George Kwabena Obeng Takyi; 29 March 1965 (age 61) Mpatuam, Ghana
- Party: New Patriotic Party
- Occupation: Politician
- Profession: Chartered Accountant
- Committees: Government Assurance Committee; Food, Agriculture and Cocoa Affairs Committee

George Kwabena Obeng Takyi (born 29 March 1965) is a chartered accountant and currently a member of the Eighth Parliament of the Fourth Republic of Ghana for Manso Nkwanta Constituency in the Ashanti Region.

== Early life and education ==
Takyi was born on 29 March 1965 at Mpatuam, in Amansie West District since 1988. He has an MBA in Chartered Accountancy, Business Communication. He also has a PhD candidate in the area of Accounting, Finance and Taxation.

== Career ==
Prior to entering politics, Takyi worked as a lecturer at the Kumasi campus of the University of Education, Winneba.

== Political Life ==
He is a member of the New Patriotic Party and currently the member of parliament for the Manso Nkwanta Constituency in the Ashanti Region. He won the NPP Parliamentary primaries for the Manso Nkwanta seat against Joseph Albert Quarm. He subsequently contested against Bance Musah Osmane, an NDC candidate in the December 2020 election. Takyi had 34,408 votes making 76.1% of the total votes cast to win the Manso Nkwanta Constituency seat on the ticket of the New Patriotic Party (NPP) whilst the NDC parliamentary aspirant had 10,798 votes making 23.9% of the total votes cast.

=== Committees ===
He is a member of the Government Assurance Committee and also a member of the Food, Agriculture and Cocoa Affairs Committee.

== Personal life ==
He is a Christian.

== Philanthropy ==
In February 2021, he presented some school uniforms and PPE to some schools in the Manso Nkwanta Constituency in the Ashanti Region.
