= Grace Addo =

Ghanaian politician (born 1960)

Member of the Ghana Parliament for Manso-Nkwanta
- In office 7 January 2013 – 6 January 2017

Personal details
- Born: December 24, 1960 (age 65)
- Party: New Patriotic Party
- Education: University of Education, Winneba

Grace Addo (born 24 December 1960) is a Ghanaian politician. She was a member of the Sixth Parliament of the Fourth Republic of Ghana, 2013 -2017. She represented the Manso-Nkwanta constituency and is a member of the New Patriotic Party.

== Early years and education ==
Addo was born on 24 December 1960 at Asarekrom in the Ashanti Region. She holds a Bachelor of Education degree (BEd) in mathematics from the University of Education, Winneba.

== Career ==
Prior to becoming a member of the Parliament of Ghana in 2012. She worked as a tutor at Ejuraman Anglican Secondary School.

== Politics ==
Addo was the former New Patriotic Party (NPP) member of parliament representative for Manso-Nkwanta constituency. In 2012, she contested in the General Elections and won. She garnered 29, 500 votes which represents 77.03% of the total votes cast and hence defeated the other contestants including Alex Kwame Bonsu, Seth Amakye and Rita Fosuah. In 2016, she lost in the New Patriotic Party parliamentary elections and hence did not get the chance to represent the party in the 2016 Ghanaian General Elections. In 2020, she again lost in the New Patriotic Party parliamentary elections.

== Personal life ==
Addo is a Christian. She is married with three children.
