= Karmzah =

Ghanaian comic series

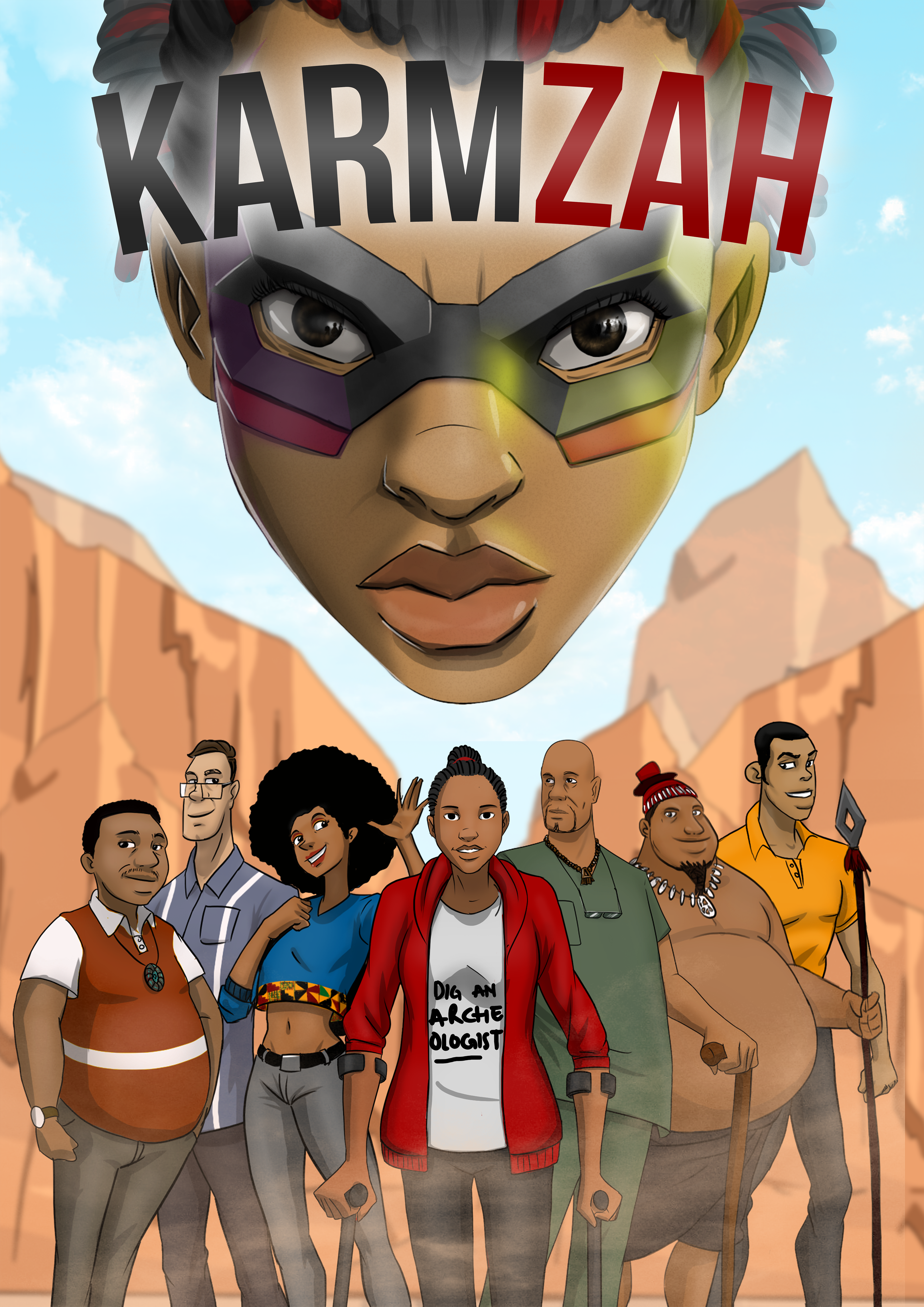
- Karmzah and her team of African heroes

Publication information
- Publisher: Afrocomix
- First appearance: 30 October,2018
- Created by: Leti Arts

Karmzah is a physically challenged super heroine with cerebral palsy whose quest is to fight bad guys in Africa and beyond. The animation or comic character was created by Farida Bedwei and the Leti Arts team from Ghana. The comic series is found on Afrocomic app on the Google Play Store. The comic character was created in other to celebrate World Cerebral Palsy Day.

== Plot ==
Morowa Adjei is a young archeologist woman with cerebral palsy, she gains superpower with her walking crutches, the power she has was given to her by a juju man she accidentally frees when she was excavating a cave in Mali. She fights bad guys who wants to destroy her local community and the African society at large. In her quest to fight evil in Africa and beyond she partners with Africa's greatest superheroes to save the day.
