= Fergus Watts =

Australian rules footballer, born 1985

Personal information
- Born: 21 September 1985 (age 41); Whipps Cross, London
- Original team: Wesley College, Melbourne/Sandringham Dragons
- Debut: Round 17, 20 June 2004, Adelaide vs. Western Bulldogs, at AAMI Stadium

Playing career^{1}
Years	Club	Games (Goals)
2004–2005	Adelaide	5 (2)
2006	St Kilda	1 (1)
Total		6 (3)
- ^{1} Playing statistics correct to the end of 2006.

Fergus Watts (born 21 September 1985) is a former professional Australian rules footballer who played for the Adelaide Football Club and the St Kilda Football Club in the Australian Football League (AFL). Watts was a forward line player. He later went on to form Bastion Collective. Watts serves as the company's executive chairman.

== Playing career ==
Originally from England, Watts was educated at Wesley College, Melbourne and was a 1st round draft selection (14th overall) for the Adelaide Crows at the 2003 AFL draft. Watts made his senior AFL debut for Adelaide in Round 17 2004, against the Western Bulldogs at AAMI Stadium. Watts played five games in 2004, kicking two goals, and a good future for Watts seemed assured. However, Watts was unable to break into Adelaide's side throughout the 2005 AFL season, instead playing with the Crows's South Australian National Football League (SANFL) affiliate Woodville-West Torrens Football Club, for whom he kicked 10 goals in the 2005 SANFL semi-final.

Watts requested to be traded to St Kilda at the end of the 2005 season, citing limited playing opportunities at Adelaide. Watts's father Jim Watts was the then CEO of St Kilda, later leaving the club in June 2006. A deal was made with Adelaide, in which St Kilda traded their first round selection (number 17 overall) at the 2005 AFL draft in return for Watts.

Watts made his debut for St Kilda in the 2006 AFL season opener against West Coast, where he kicked one goal. Dropped to St Kilda's Victorian Football League (VFL) affiliate Casey Scorpions, Watts broke his ankle two weeks later. His recovery was prolonged, punctuated by five surgeries on his leg and ankle and a struggle with osteitis pubis. Although returning to the VFL in the latter half of 2007, Watts was unable to break back into the AFL and at the end of the season he was delisted by St Kilda.

== Business career ==
In 2009, after his football career ended, the 23 year Watts founded advertising agency Bastion Group. He had been working in an advertising agency, and then decided to form his own company.

In October 2015, the company changed its name to Bastion Collective. As of 2018, it was reportedly the largest independent marketing and communications group in Australia.
