= Tata Starbus =

Range of buses manufactured by Tata Motors

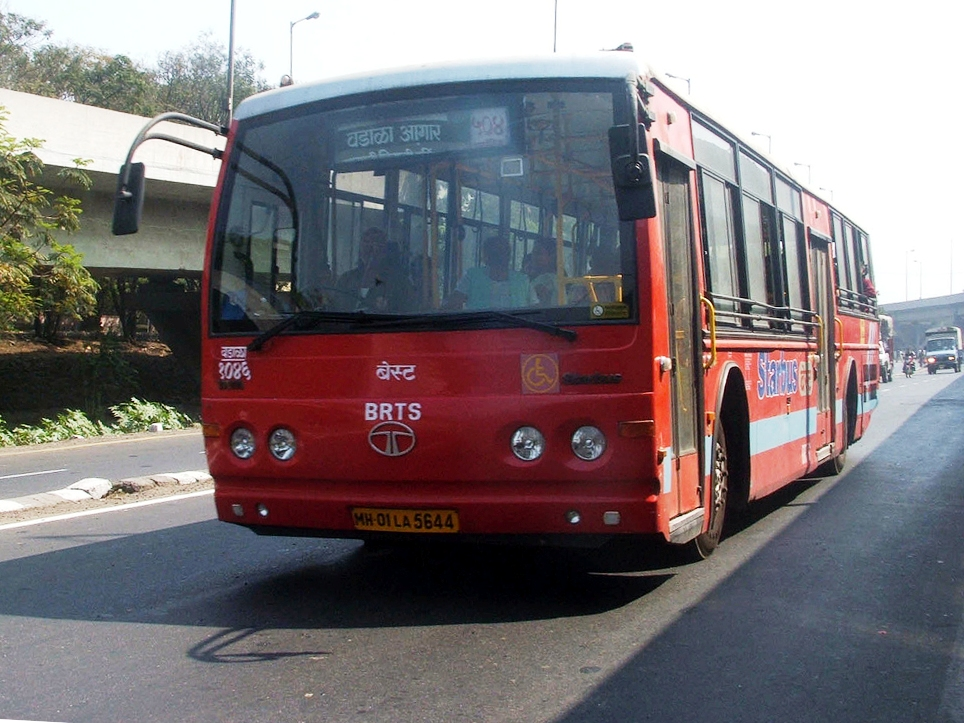

Overview
- Manufacturer: Tata Motors
- Assembly: ACGL- Goa, HMM- Haryana and Maharashtra

Body and chassis
- Class: Bus

Powertrain
- Engine: various options

The Tata Starbus is a range of buses manufactured by Tata Motors. It is available in various variants, including low-floor and standard-floor options, with seating capacity ranging from 16 to 67 passengers. The buses offer multiple powertrain choices, such as diesel, CNG, and electric.

== Variants ==
Starbus Skool

BS6 Diesel

- Starbus Prime 20+A+D LP 410/29
- Starbus Prime 25+A+D LP 410/33
- Starbus Prime 30+A+D LP 412/36
- Starbus Prime 34+A+D LP 412/36
- Starbus Prime 34+A+D AC 412/36
- Starbus Prime 38+A+D LP 412/36
- Starbus Prime 38+A+D AC 412/36
- Starbus Prime 46+A+D LP 712/45
- Starbus Prime 46+A+D AC 712/45
- Starbus Prime 46+A+D AC 716/45
- Starbus Prime 51+A+D LP 812/52
- Starbus Prime 51+A+D LP 916/52
- Starbus Prime 51+A+D AC 916/52
- Starbus Prime 53+A+D LP 712/45
- Ultra Prime 58+A+D LPO 11.6/54
- Starbus Prime 59+A+D LP 812/52
- Ultra SKL 48+A+D LPO 8.6/44
- Ultra SKL 58+A+D LPO 11.6/54

BSVI CNG

- Starbus Prime 34+A+D LP 410/36G
- Starbus Prime 34+A+D AC 410/36G
- Starbus Prime 38+A+D LP 410/36G
- Starbus Prime 38+A+D AC 410/36G
- Starbus Prime 51+A+D LP 910/52G

Starbus Standard/Staff bus

Available in 16, 18, 20, 32, 54, and 67-seater configurations, Starbus Standard is built to handle varying road conditions without compromising passenger safety.

1. Starbus 16 - Chassis Platform - SFC 407/27
2. Starbus 18 CNG - Chassis Platform - LP 407/31 CNG
3. Starbus 20 - Chassis Platform - SFC 407/31
4. Starbus 32 - Chassis Platform - LP 709/38
5. Starbus 54 - Chassis Platform - LP 1510/53
6. Starbus 67 - Chassis Platform - LPO 1610/62
7. Starbus Ultra 34+D LPO 7.5/44
8. Starbus Ultra 34+D AC LPO 7.5/44
9. Starbus Ultra 40+D HBR AC LPO 10.2/54
10. Starbus Ultra 44+D LPO 10.2/54
11. Starbus Ultra 44+D AC LPO 10.2/54
12. Starbus Ultra 50+D LPO 10.2/54
- Starbus Deluxe

Designed to allow inter-city travellers to commute quickly, comfortably and affordably between destinations. Starbus Deluxe variants are available in 18, 20, 28 and 35-seater configurations.

1. Starbus Dlx 18 - Chassis Platform - SFC 713/38
2. Starbus Dlx 20 - Chassis Platform - LP 407/31
3. Starbus Dlx 28 - Chassis Platform - LP 709/38
4. Starbus Dlx 35 - Chassis Platform - LPO 916/42
- Starbus Urban

With an ultra-modern, low floor design have a floor height of 650 mm and broad doors allow passengers to board and alight quickly and easily. You can also opt for Ultra Low Floor City Buses, with a floor height of only 380mm. Also available are high floor chassis models adding with an additional door for transit use

Low Floor range

1. Starbus EV 4/12m Low entry AC electric bus
2. Starbus EV 4/12m Low entry non AC electric bus
3. Starbus EV 4/12m Low floor AC electric bus
4. Starbus EV 4/12m Low floor non AC electric bus

High Floor range

1. Starbus 24+D LP 410/36
2. Starbus 24+D AC LP 410/36
3. Starbus 32+D LP 710/45
4. Starbus 32+D AC LP 712/45
5. Starbus 40+D LP 912/52
6. Starbus 40+D LP 810/52
7. Starbus 40+D AC LP 912/52
8. Starbus 67 - Chassis Platform - LPO 1610/62
9. Starbus Ultra 34+D LPO 7.5/44
10. Starbus Ultra 34+D AC LPO 7.5/44
11. Starbus Ultra 40+D HBR AC LPO 10.2/54
12. Starbus Ultra 44+D LPO 10.2/54
13. Starbus Ultra 44+D AC LPO 10.2/54
14. Starbus Ultra 50+D LPO 10.2/54
15. Tata Ultra 9/9m AC Electric Bus
16. Tata Ultra 9/9m Non AC Electric Bus
17. Tata Urban 9/12m AC Electric Bus
18. Tata Urban 9/12m Non AC Electric Bus
19. Ultra EV 7M

== Public transport ==
The Tata Starbus has been in use by the Brihanmumbai Electricity Supply and Transport (BEST) in Mumbai since 2005.
