= Bastion (agency) =

Global marketing and advisory company

- Industry: Advertising, Marketing
- Founded: 2009
- Founder: Fergus Watts
- Headquarters: Cremorne, Victoria Waterloo, New South Wales, Australia
- Number of locations: Worldwide
- Key people: Fergus Watts, Chairman; Jack Watts, Australia CEO; Dax Cornelius, US CEO
- Services: Marketing and advisory services
- Website: bastionagency.com

Bastion is a global marketing and advisory company headquartered in the Melbourne, Australia suburb of Cremorne, Victoria. It is reportedly the largest independent marketing and communications group in Australia and New Zealand, and was founded in 2009 by former professional Australian rules footballer Fergus Watts. Watts serves as the company's executive chairman.

== History ==
Bastion was founded in 2009 as Bastion Group by 23 year old Fergus Watts, who briefly played for the Adelaide Football Club and the St Kilda Football Club in the Australian Football League (AFL). After his football career ended due to an injury, he started working in an advertising agency, and then decided to form his own company.

In 2010, the company acquired PR Agency Undertow Media.

In October 2015, the company changed its name to Bastion Collective.

In January 2016, the company acquired Melbourne and Sydney-based research agency Latitude Insights, renaming it Bastion Latitude.

In March 2017, the company received media coverage for its policy of unlimited leave for its staff. In October, the company hired former US Air Force fighter pilot Dax Cornelius to launch its expansion in the United States. It opened an office in Irvine, California, and in 2018 formed its U.S. footprint with the acquisitions of digital marketing firm Rare Branding and web-app development firm Digital Brand Group (DBG), followed by LFPR, a social media and public relations company. Rare Branding and DBG were merged to form Bastion Rare, and LFPR was rebranded as Bastion Elevate.

In May 2018, the company launched Bastion China, an advisory firm for companies doing business with China, and Bastion Engage, a community and government engagement agency. In July, the company launched creative agency Bastion State. In October, the company announced it was buying a stake in Sydney, Australia-based agency Banjo. In November, the company acquired social research company Stable Research, and Melbourne-based production house Bengar Films. Bengar Films was merged with Bastion's production business Bastion Stadium to form Bastion Films which rebranded into Bastion Make in September 2022

In November 2019, Bastion acquired a Highland Park, California-based consumer insights and strategy agency db5. In 2020, Peter Harris was appointed as the CEO of Bastion Insights, coming from his CEO position at Potentiate.

In October 2020, the company renamed its Bastion China operations as Bastion Asia.

In October 2021, the company changed its name to Bastion.

In November 2021, Bastion acquired NZ Agency Shine, renaming it to Bastion Shine Later, in August 2022 Bastion Shine launched four new specialty business units to broaden their service offering - Bastion Creative, Bastion Digital, Bastion Amplify and Bastion Transform. They then expanded into Wellington in November 2022

In December 2022, Bastion Reputation, who previously solely operated out of Melbourne, expanded into Sydney Later, in November 2023, they opened a Canberra office

Continuing this growth pattern, Bastion has also expanded into Queensland with the acquisition of top public relations firm, Promedia, in November 2022 to be a part of their communications arm - Bastion Amplify. Additionally, Bastion Experience opened a new office in southeast Queensland.

== Operations ==
Founder Fergus Watts serves as Bastion's non-executive chairman, his brother Jack serves as Global CEO, and Dax Cornelius is the United States CEO. Former AFL CEO Andrew Demetriou and sports broadcaster Hamish McLachlan sit on the company's board.

The company's global headquarters is in the Melbourne, Australia suburb of Richmond Cremorne, Victoria, and the company lists additional offices in Sydney, Gold Coast, Canberra, Brisbane, Auckland, Wellington, Los Angeles, Orange County, CA, and New York City.

The company operates several sub-divisions in Australia:

- Bastion Amplify, formerly Bastion Effect, specialises in media relations, influencer marketing and social media
- Bastion Creative, formerly Bastion Banjo, specializes in supporting brand strategy for clients.
- Bastion Digital focuses on helping clients with brand experience, customer experience (CX), and technology transformation.
- Bastion Experience, formerly Bastion EBA, specialises in sponsorship, events and experiential marketing
- Bastion Insights, formerly Bastion db5, is a market research company
- Bastion Make, formerly Bastion Films, is Bastion's in-house video production studio
- Bastion Reputation manages strategic corporate affairs for clients
- Bastion Transform is a digital advisory, strategy and organisation renewal consultancy.

As part of Bastion's 2021 acquisition of New Zealand's Shine, the company operates four sub-divisions in New Zealand, with similar focus as their Australian counterparts: Bastion Amplify, Bastion Creative, Bastion Digital, and Bastion Transform.

In the United States, the company operates two businesses as part of Bastion USA:

- Bastion Insights, formerly Bastion db5, a consumer insights and strategy agency.
- Bastion Amplify, formerly Bastion Effect, a social media and public relations company.
