= Devon Bat Group =

English bat conservation organisation

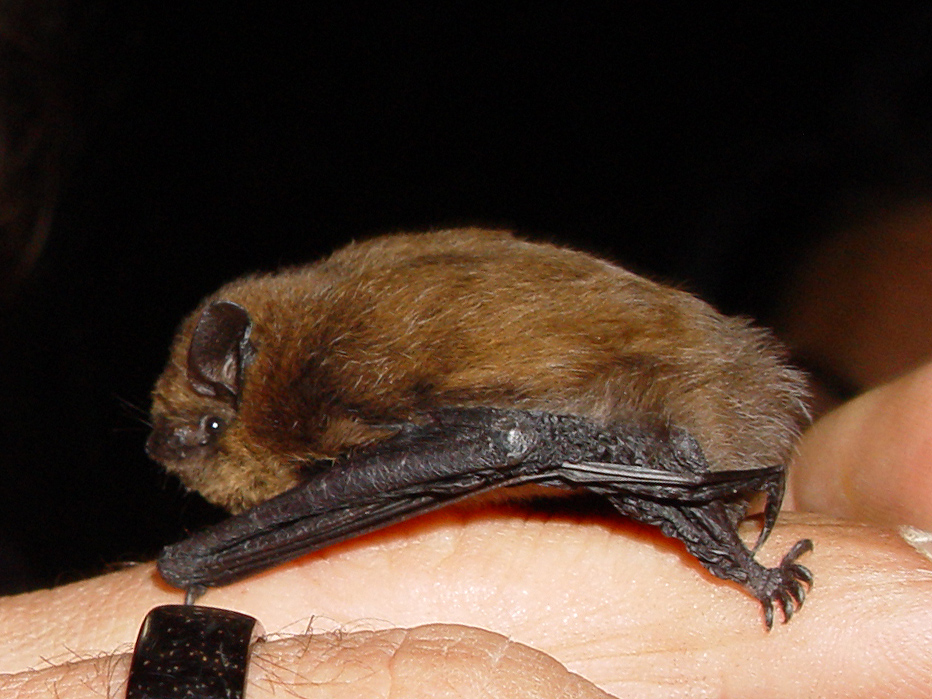
Common Pipistrelle

The Devon Bat Group (DBG) was founded in 1984 to help protect bats and their habitats, to look after injured bats and to advise and educate people about bats.

== History ==
The Devon Bat Group was formed in the English county of Devon in 1984 by people concerned about the decline of British bats. Devon, in the South West of England, is of special importance as it supports most of the British bat species and DBG members work to maintain this diversity and increase our knowledge about bats. It is one of a network of bat groups in the UK which are members of The Bat Conservation Trust. The Bat Conservation Trust was formed in 1991 as an umbrella organisation for the network of bat groups in the UK.

== Group members and activities ==
The Group members range from people who are interested in learning more about bats and those wanting to join in group activities to professional ecologists. Activities include roost visits, organising bat box schemes, with regular box checks, and bat surveys. Educational talks, arranging bat walks and caring for sick and injured bats are also organised by DBG members. Members with bat licences carry out Bat Roost Visitor work for Natural England. General Group meetings are held every three months and the DBG also has local sections in Exeter, Plymouth and North Devon to organise more local activities.

The group works in partnership with many other organisations across Devon. At several reservoirs across Devon, they have worked with the South West Lakes Trust to monitor bat populations at Roadford Lake and other reservoirs. They participate in the Devon Greater Horseshoe Bat Project alongside Devon Wildlife Trust, Clinton Devon Estates, Devon County Council and others. In 2014 and 2015 they helped to run a citizen science project called The Big Exeter Bat Survey to find out about where (and which) bats live in Exeter. As part of the work to re-open Hemerdon Mine, survey data from the group were used as evidence to draw up a plan to mitigate the impact of mining on the bats.

== Bat species found in Devon ==
16 out of 18 UK resident species of bat have been found in Devon. The exceptions are Myotis myotis, the Greater Mouse-Eared bat and Myotis alcathoe the Alcathoe bat.

=== Barbastelle ===
- Barbastella barbastellus: barbastelle

=== Serotine ===
- Eptesicus serotinus: serotine bat

=== Myotis ===
- Myotis bechsteinii: Bechstein's bat
- Myotis brandtii: Brandt's bat;
- Myotis daubentonii: Daubenton's bat
- Myotis mystacinus: whiskered bat
- Myotis nattereri: Natterer's bat;

=== Noctules ===
- Nyctalus leisleri: Leisler's bat
- Nyctalus noctula: noctule bat

=== Pipistrelles ===
- Pipistrellus nathusii: Nathusius' pipistrelle
- Pipistrellus pipistrellus: common pipistrelle
- Pipistrellus pygmaeus: soprano pipistrelle

=== Long-eared bats ===
- Plecotus auritus: brown long-eared bat
- Plecotus austriacus: grey long-eared bat

=== Horseshoe bats ===
- Rhinolophus ferrumequinum: greater horseshoe bat;
- Rhinolophus hipposideros: lesser horseshoe bat;

== See also ==
- List of bat roosts
