= Republic Bank Ghana Limited =

Commercial bank in Ghana

Coordinates: 05°34′09″N 00°11′40″W

Republic Bank (Ghana) PLC
- Type: Public: subsidiary of Republic Bank Group
- Traded as: GSE: RBGH
- Industry: Financial services
- Founded: 7 May 1990; 36 years ago
- Headquarters: Accra, Ghana
- Key people: Jonathan Prince Cann, board chairman Benjamin Dzoboku, managing director & CEO
- Products: Loana, checking, savings, investments, debit cards
- Revenue: ▲Aftertax:GHS:18,006,000 (US$3.13 million) (Q1:2020)
- Total assets: GHS:3.377 billion (US$586.5 million) (Q1:2020)
- Website: Homepage

Republic Bank (Ghana) PLC is a commercial bank in Ghana. It is one of the commercial banks licensed by the Bank of Ghana, the central bank and national banking regulator.

== Location ==
The headquarters of the bank are located at 48A, Sixth Avenue, North Ridge, Accra, Ghana. The geographical coordinates of the bank's headquarters are: 05°34'09.0"N, 0°11'40.0"W (Latitude:5.569167; Longitude:-0.194444).

== Overview ==
As of March 2020, Republic Bank (Ghana) PLC was a medium-sized financial services provider in Ghana, with total assets valued at GHS:3.377 billion (US$586.5 million) and shareholders' equity valued at GHS:574,616,000 (approximately US$99.8 million).

== Republic Bank (Ghana) PLC ==
Republic Bank (Ghana) PLC is a component and subsidiary of the Republic Bank Group, with headquarters in Trinidad and Tobago, with banking subsidiaries in Barbados, Cayman Islands, Ghana, Grenada, Guyana, Suriname and Trinidad and Tobago. As of 31 January, the group's holding company, Republic Financial Holdings Limited, had total assets of US$98.4 billion.

== History ==
The bank was incorporated on 7 May 1990 as a private limited liability company. It was first licensed as a mortgage financing institution. It commenced business on 2 December 1991. On 1 August 1994, Bank of Ghana licensed the company, then called Housing Finance Company Ghana Limited, as a non-bank financial institution. Universal banking status was received on 17 November 2003, from Bank of Ghana.

The institution was listed on the Ghana Stock Exchange on 17 March 1995. On 13 May 2015, the bank, then HFC Bank, received regulatory approval to become a subsidiary of Republic Financial Holdings Limited and become a member of the Republic Bank Group.

== Ownership ==
As of September 2020, the bank's stock is owned by the following corporate entities and individuals:

Republic Bank Ghana stock ownership
Rank	Name of owner	Percentage ownership
1	Republic Financial Holdings Limited	66.54
2	Social Security and National Insurance Trust	25.87
3	Ghana Union Assurance Company Limited	4.97
4	SCGN/Ghana International Bank Plc	1.08
5	Other investors	1.54
	Total	100.00

== Branch network ==
Republic Bank has its headquarters in Accra, the capital city of Ghana. The branches of the bank and its subsidiary companies include the following locations:

- Head office - Sixth Avenue, North Ridge, Accra
- Ebankese Branch - Sixth Avenue, North Ridge, Accra
- Accra Central Branch - Kwame Nkrumah Avenue, Accra
- Ridge Branch - 6 Sixth Avenue, West Ridge, Accra
- Tema Branch - Asafoatse Kotei Commercial Complex, Tema
- Legon Branch - Noguchi Road, University of Ghana, Legon
- Kumasi Branch - 571 Asomfo Road, Kumasi
- HFC Investment Services Limited - 6 Sixth Avenue, West Ridge, Accra
- Tudu Branch - St. Francis Building, Kinbu Road, Tudu
- Abossey Okai Branch
- Techiman Branch
- HFC Realty Limited
- Agbogbloshie Branch - Old Fadama Road
- Tamale Branch - 8 Daboya Street, Tamale
- KNUST Kumasi Branch - KNUST Commercial Area, Kumasi
- Koforidua Branch
- Baatsona Branch - Spintex Road
- Ashaiman Branch
- Takoradi Branch - Market Circle
- Kasoa Branch
- Post Office Square Branch
- Adabraka Branch
- Suame Branch - Suame Magazine
- Swedru Branch
- Cape Coast Branch - Tantri
- Winneba Branch
- Asamankese Branch
- Dansoman Branch

== See also ==
- List of financial institutions in Ghana
