= Prudential Bank Limited =

Private commercial bank in Ghana

Prudential Bank Ltd.
- Type: Private
- Industry: Financial services
- Founded: 1996; 30 years ago
- Headquarters: 8 John Harmond Street (formerly 8 Nima Avenue), Ring Road Central, Accra, Ghana
- Key people: Muriel Susan Edusei, chairman Ebow Quayson, acting managing director
- Products: Loans, checking, savings, investments, debit cards
- Revenue: ▲(Aftertax) GHS:9.62 million (2012)
- Total assets: GHS:676.61 million (2012)
- Website: Homepage

Prudential Bank Ltd. (PBL), commonly known as Prudential Bank, is a private commercial bank in Ghana. It is licensed by the Bank of Ghana, the central bank and national banking regulator.

== Location ==
The headquarters of the bank is located at 8 John Hammond Street, Ring Road Central, Kanda, Accra, Ghana's capital and largest city. The coordinates of the bank's headquarters are 5°34'24.0"N, 0°11'31.0"W (Latitude:5.573335; Longitude:-0.191949).

== Overview ==
The bank was incorporated in 1993, and opened on 15 August 1996 with the first branch in Accra.

PBL is a medium-sized bank specializing in meeting the banking needs of small and medium-sized businesses and individuals.

As of 31 December 2012, the bank's total assets were GHS:676.61 million, with shareholders' equity of GHS:85.1 million.

== Subsidiary ==
As of July 2023, PBL maintained one wholly owned subsidiary, Prudential Securities Limited, which is engaged in funds management, pension fund management, corporate finance, business advisory services, and equity and economic research.

== Ownership ==
The bank's stock was owned by the following corporate entities and individuals as of 30 June 2023:

Prudential Bank Limited stock ownership
Rank	Name of owner	Percentage ownership
1	Ghana Amalgamated Trust	47.00
2	Frank Owusu	17.10
3	J. S. Addo Consultants Limited	8.63
4	Trustees of PBL Staff Provident Fund	6.47
5	Akwasi Aboagye Atuah	4.33
6	Ghana Union Assurance Company Limited	4.25
7	Stephen Sekyere-Abankwa	3.66
8	Nortey K. Omaboe	3.63
9	Kofi O. Esson	2.09
10	NTHC Brokerage Services Limited	1.65
11	John K. Addo	0.82
12	Nana Agyei Duku	0.38
	Total	100.0%

== Branch network ==
As of July 2023, PBL had 39 branches and two agencies at the following locations:

- Abeka Branch - Accra
- Aboabo Branch - Kumasi
- Abossey Okai Branch - Accra
- Accra Branch - Accra
- Adentan Branch - Accra
- Afful Nkwanta Branch - Kumasi
- Airport City Branch - Accra
- Atonsu Branch - Kumasi
- Cantonments Branch - Accra
- Cape Coast Branch - Cape Coast
- East Legon Branch - East Legon, Accra
- Gicel Branch - Accra
- Haatso Branch - Accra
- Koforidua Branch - Koforidua
- Kumasi Adum Branch - Kumasi
- Kumasi Main Branch - Kumasi
- Madina Branch - Accra
- Makola Branch - Accra
- Mataheko Branch - Accra
- Methodist University Agency Branch - Accra
- Nungua Branch - Accra
- Odorkor Branch - Accra
- Okaishie Branch - Accra
- Ring Road Central Branch - Accra
- Santasi Roundabout Branch - Kumasi
- Spintex Road Branch - Accra
- Suame Maakro Branch - Kumasi
- Sunyani Branch - Sunyani
- Taifa Branch - Accra
- Takoradi Harbour Branch - Takoradi
- Takoradi Market Circle Branch - Takoradi
- Tamale Branch - Tamale
- Techiman Branch - Techiman
- Tema Community 1 Branch - Tema
- Tema Fishing Harbour Branch - Tema
- Tesano Branch - Accra
- University of Cape Coast Branch - Cape Coast
- University of Cape Coast Agency Branch - Cape Coast
- University of Ghana Branch - Accra
- Valley View Agency Branch - Accra
- Weija Branch - Accra

== See also ==
- List of banks in Ghana
- Economy of Ghana
