= First National Bank Ghana =

Commercial bank in Ghana

Coordinates: 05°33′19″N 00°12′05″W

- Type: Subsidiary
- Industry: Financial services
- Founded: 2015; 11 years ago
- Headquarters: Accra, Ghana
- Key people: Stephan Claassen (Chairman); Warren Adams (CEO)
- Products: Commercial banking Loans; Investments
- Parent: FirstRand
- Website: firstnationalbank.com.gh

First National Bank Ghana Limited (FNBGL), commonly referred to as First National Bank Ghana, is a commercial bank in Ghana. It is licensed by the Bank of Ghana, the central bank and national banking regulator. FNB Ghana is a subsidiary of major South African financial services corporation FirstRand.

== Location ==
The bank's headquarters are located on the 6th Floor of Accra Financial Centre, at the corner of Independence Avenue and Liberia Avenue, in the neighborhood called West Ridge, in Accra, Ghana's capital city. The geographic coordinates of the bank's headquarters are:05°33'19.0"N, 0°12'05.0"W (Latitude:5.555278; Longitude:-0.201389).

== Overview ==
First National Bank Ghana received a Universal banking license from the Bank of Ghana during the second half of 2015. It opened its first branch in Accra that same year. Beginning as a new greenfield operation, the bank plans to grow organically, with emphasis on digital applications, but mindful of the Ghanaian customers' desire for personal contact.

First National Bank Ghana is a subsidiary of First National Bank South Africa, which is the retail banking arm of FirstRand Group, a large financial services conglomerate, headquartered in South Africa and whose shares are listed on the JSE Limited, where they trade under the symbol FSR.

== Merger with Ghana Home Loan Bank ==
In September 2017, the Bank of Ghana directed all universal banks in Ghana to raise their minimum capital reserves from GHS:120 million (US$22.8 million) to GHS:400 million (US$73.4 million). First National Bank Ghana, with the support of its South African parent was able to meet the new minimums. However, Ghana Home Loan Bank (GHLB), an indigenous Ghanaian enterprise, had challenges raising new capital. GHLB turned to FNB Ghana to discuss a merger or a buyout.

In May 2020, after regulatory approval from the Reserve Bank of South Africa and the Bank of Ghana, as well as consent from the shareholders of both banks, FNB Ghana acquired 100 percent of the shares of Ghana Home Loan Bank. As of 15 May 2020, the process to merge the operations of the two banks were underway. The merger was completed during the second quarter of 2020.

== Governance ==
As of May 2020, the chairman of the seven-person board of directors is Stephan Claassen. Dominic Adu serves as the chief executive officer and leads a team of 11 senior managers in running the day-to-day affairs of the bank.

== Awards and recognition ==
First National Bank received seven awards at the 2023 World's Best Consumer Digital Banks in Africa by Global Finance. The recognition highlights the bank's leadership in user experience, digital interfaces, information security, and fraud prevention.

- Best Consumer Mobile Banking App in Africa
- Best Consumer Digital Bank for User Experience design in Africa
- Best Consumer Digital Bank in South Africa
- Best Consumer Mobile Banking App - country winner in South Africa
- Best Consumer Digital Bank for User Experience design in South Africa
- Best Consumer Digital Bank for Information Security and Fraud Management in Africa
- Best Consumer Digital Bank for Information Security and Fraud Management in South Africa

== Services ==
=== Home insurance ===
This insurance covers:

- Glass and sanitary ware
- Compensation for damage to the property of guests and domestic employees

=== Motor insurance ===
The insurance coverage encompasses services such as post-repair delivery, replacement of stolen or severely damaged vehicles with new ones, coverage for lost or damaged keys, locks, and remote-control units, and the option for car rental.

=== Travel insurance ===
These insurance protect against losses or incidents occurring overseas.

== See also ==
- List of banks in Ghana
