= Farida Bedwei =

Ghanaian software engineer

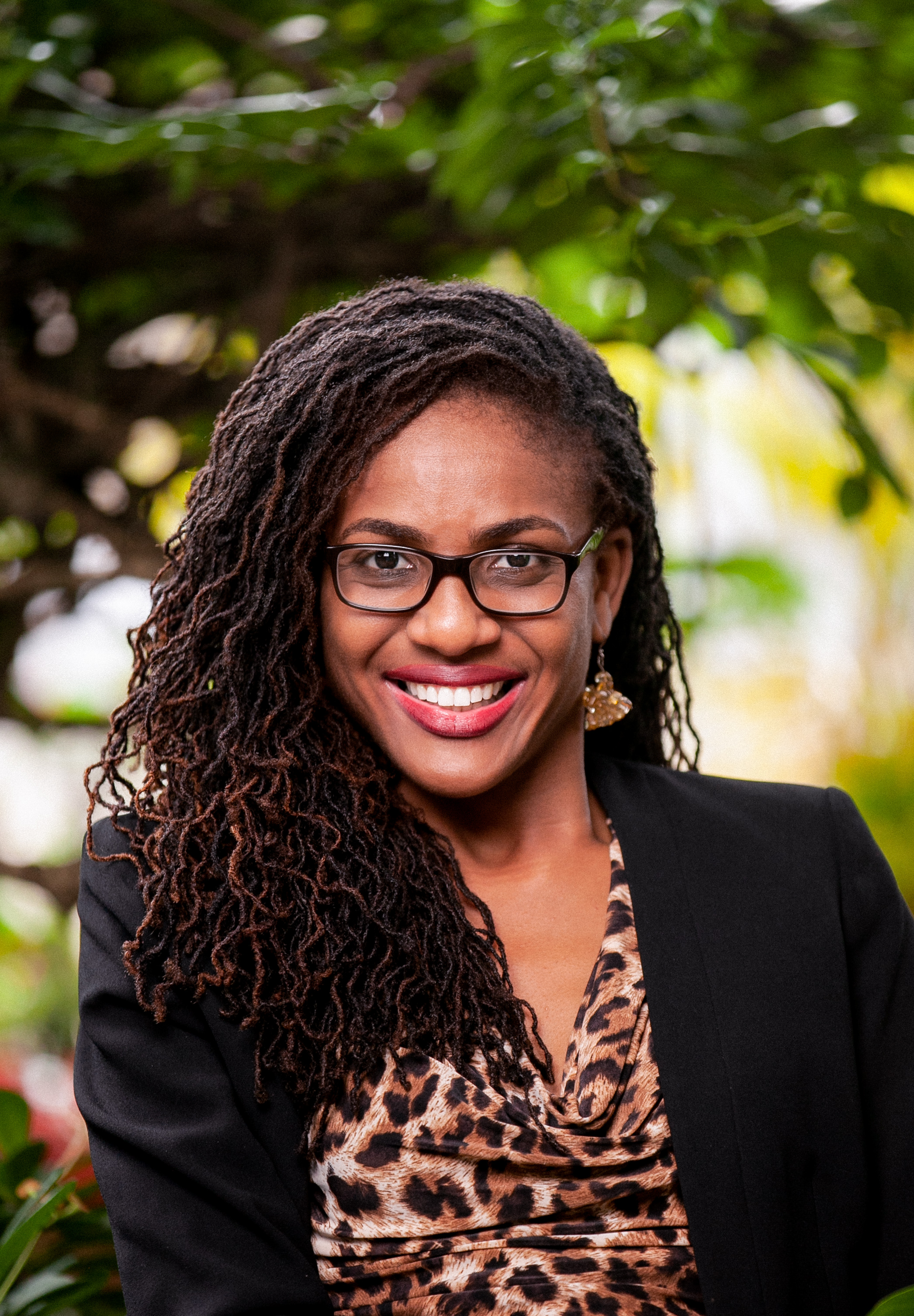
- Born: Farida Nana Efua Bedwei; 6 April 1979 (age 47); Lagos, Nigeria
- Citizenship: Ghana
- Occupation: Software engineer

Farida Nana Efua Bedwei (born 6 April 1979) is a Ghanaian software engineer and co-founder of Logiciel, a fin-tech company in Ghana. Farida Bedwei has built mobile and enterprise applications, and is also known for her knowledge of software architecture, and deploying mobile services, particularly for banking applications.

== Early life ==
Farida was born in Lagos, Nigeria and spent her early childhood living in three different countries (Dominica, Grenada and UK) due to the nature of her fathers job with the United Nations Development Programme. She was diagnosed with cerebral palsy at the age of one. Her family moved to Ghana when she was 9 years old and was home schooled until 12 years.

== Education ==
She was home schooled until the age of 12 when she was first sent to a government school in Ghana. When she was 15, Farida's parents noticed her passion for computers and decided to enroll her in a one-year computer course at the St. Michael information technology centre, making her one of the youngest in the class and also enabled her to skip high school. She later obtained a one-year degree in Computer Science from the University of Hertfordshire in the United Kingdom (from 2004 to 2005) and further acquired a certificate in Project Management in 2009 from the Ghana Institute of Management and Public Administration (GIMPA).

== Career ==
Farida Bedwei began her career as a software developer at Soft Company Ltd (now known as the Softtribe), and moved from there to Rancard Solutions Ltd, where she progressed from the position of solutions analyst to Senior Software Architect from 2001 to 2010.

At Rancard Solutions, she was responsible for the development and maintenance of mobility platforms. One of her achievements at Rancard Solutions include the development of a content management system for the Commission for Human Rights and Administrative Justice and PayBureau, an enterprise web-based payroll application for KPMG Accra to facilitate simultaneous management of payroll services for different companies.

In 2010, Bedwei moved to G-Life Microfinance, where she was responsible for designing and implementing new products and services. In April 2011, she left to set up her own company, Logiciel Ltd., Accra, Ghana, where she is the co-founder and chief technology officer. At Logiciel Ltd., she led the creation and successful implementation of gKudi, a web-based (cloud) banking software suite for the micro-finance industry, used by 130 micro-finance institutions nationwide.

In 2015, she authored her first book, a mini-autobiography titled The Definition of a Miracle. She has since received several awards and appointments including her appointment to the Board of Ghana's National Communication Authority.

Farida also created a cerebral palsy superhero. Her comic character called Karmzah gets her power from her crutches that she has to use for her cerebral palsy.

As of April 2022, Farida Bedwei holds the position of Principal Software Engineer at Microsoft, where she is involved in the development of Metaverse technologies.

== Achievements and awards ==
- 2018 – Special Award by President Abdel Fattah El SISI.
- 2013 – Winner of Most Influential Women in Business and Government Award Financial Sector.
- 2012 – Special Award by President John Mahama.
- 2011 – Legacy and Legacy Ideas Award – Winner of the Maiden Award.
