= List of commercial banks in Ghana =

Below is a list of commercial banks in Ghana, as updated by the Bank of Ghana in late 2024.

== List of commercial banks ==
- Absa Bank Ghana Limited, part of Absa Group
- Access Bank (Ghana) PLC, part of Access Bank Group
- Agricultural Development Bank PLC, state-owned
- Bank of Africa Ghana Limited, part of Bank of Africa Group
- CalBank PLC
- Consolidated Bank Ghana Limited, state-owned
- Ecobank Ghana PLC, part of Ecobank Group
- FBNBank (Ghana) Limited, part of First Bank of Nigeria Group
- Fidelity Bank Ghana Limited
- First Atlantic Bank Limited
- First National Bank (Ghana) Limited, part of FirstRand Group
- GCB Bank PLC, majority state-owned
- Guaranty Trust Bank (Ghana) Limited, part of GTCO Group
- National Investment Bank Limited, state-owned
- OmniBSIC Bank Ghana Limited
- Prudential Bank Limited
- Republic Bank (Ghana) PLC, part of Republic Bank Group
- Societe Generale Ghana PLC, part of Société Générale
- Stanbic Bank Ghana Limited, part of Standard Bank Group
- Standard Chartered Bank Ghana PLC, part of Standard Chartered Group
- United Bank for Africa (Ghana) Limited, part of UBA Group
- Universal Merchant Bank Limited
- Zenith Bank (Ghana) Limited, part of Zenith Bank Group

== See also ==
- Economy of Ghana
- List of banks in Africa
