= German Soil Science Society =

German nonprofit organization

- Deutsche Bodenkundliche Gesellschaft
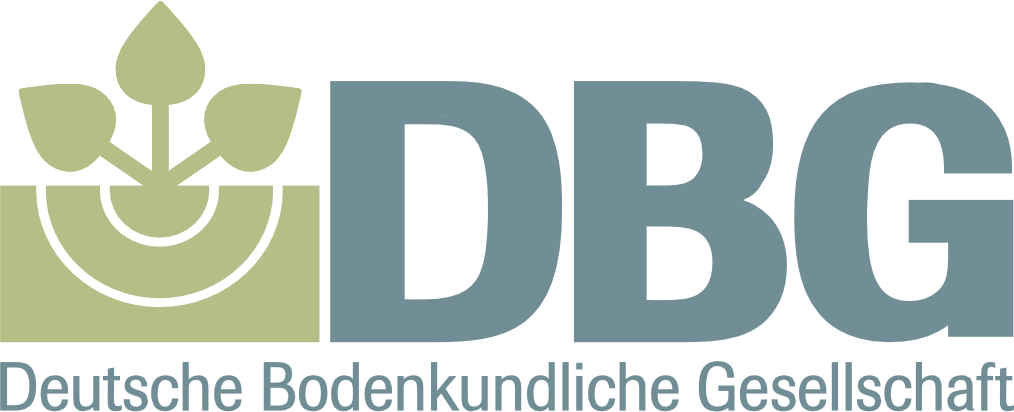
- Abbreviation: DBG
- Formation: 1926
- Type: Scientific
- Purpose: Research
- Headquarters: Leipzig
- Location: Germany
- Members: ca. 2100
- Official language: German / English
- President / CEO: Daniela Sauer
- Website: http://www.dbges.de

The German Soil Science Society (Deutsche Bodenkundliche Gesellschaft, DBG) is a non-profit organisation of soil science experts and others interested in this area.

== Mission and aims ==
Founded in 1926 in Berlin as a section of the International Soil Science Society (Internationalen Bodenkundlichen Gesellschaft IBG). After the Second World War the society was formed in Wiesbaden. Today there are around 2000 members, and its headquarters have been in Göttingen since 2012 (before that in Oldenburg). The bi-annual meeting of the DBG is the most important platform of German-speaking areas for the exchange of new findings in soil science. The 2013 meeting was in Rostock, that of 2015 in Munich. In 2017 it will be held in Göttingen. Board members are: Georg Guggenberger, Ute Wollschläger, Jens Utermann, Friederike Lang and GF Christian Ahl. Honorary members are: Hans-Peter Blume, Hendrik de Bakker, Hans-Joachim Fiedler, Immo Lieberoth, Monika Frielinghaus, Dietrich Rau († 2015), Othmar Nestroy, Peter Hugenroth, Günter Roeschmann, Hans Sticher, Udo Schwertmann († 2016), Bernhard Ulrich († 2016), Botho Wohlrab, Wolfgang Zech.

The DBG includes the following disciplines (committees) whose chairmen are members of the extended executive board.

- Soil physics and soil hydrology
- Soil chemistry
- Soil biology and ecology
- Soil fertility and plant nutrition
- Soil genetics, soil systematics and soil information
- Soil protection and soil technology
- Soil mineralogy
- Soil in education and society

The society's journal is the Journal of Plant Nutrition and Soil Science (formerly: Zeitschrift für Pflanzenernährung und Bodenkunde) which is published together with the Deutschen Gesellschaft für Pflanzenernährung (German Society of Plant Nutrition). In addition there is the Mitteilungen der Deutschen Bodenkundlichen Gesellschaft (Communications of the German Pedological Society) in which the Excursion Guide and annual meeting reports also appear. The Green Pages (Grünen Blätter) include last-minute communications about meetings and developments in soil science institutes. There is also an on-line publication, Berichte der DBG (DBG Reports).

- The society awards the Emil-Ramann-Medal,
- Fritz-Scheffer-Prize and the
- Ulrich-Babel-Prize.

== International network ==
- Bodenkundliche Gesellschaft der Schweiz (Swiss Soil Science Society)
- International Union of Soil Science
- Österreichische Bodenkundliche Gesellschaft (Austrian Soil Science Society)
- World Congress of Soil Science

== Literature ==
- Hans-Peter Blume: 1926–2001. 75 Jahre Bodenkundliche Gesellschaft. (75 Years of the German Soil Science Society) in Mitteilungen der Deutschen Bodenkundlichen Gesellschaft Vol. 97, 2001.
