= Manso Nkwanta (Ghana parliament constituency) =

Constituency in the Ashanti Region of Ghana

- constituency for the Parliament of Ghana
- District: Amansie West District
- Region: Ashanti Region of Ghana

Current constituency
- Party: New Patriotic Party
- MP: Tweneboa Kodua Fokuo

Manso Nkwanta is one of the constituencies represented in the Parliament of Ghana. It elects one Member of Parliament (MP) by the first past the post system of election. Tweneboa Kodua Fokuo is the member of parliament for the constituency. Manso Nkwanta is located in the Amansie West District of the Ashanti Region of Ghana.

== Boundaries ==
The seat is located within the Amansie West District of the Ashanti Region of Ghana.

== Members of Parliament ==
Year	Election	Party	Ref
2020	George Takyi	NPP	

== Elections ==
Ghanaian parliamentary election, 2016: Manso Nkwanta Source: Peacefmonline
Party	Candidate	Votes	%
Npp	Joseph Albert Quarm	32,140	82.63
Ndc	Alex Kwame Bonsu	5,503	14.26
Ind	Afranie Michael	560	1.45
Ufp	Osei Michael	162	0.42
Ppp	Osei Coffie Isaac	123	0.32
Pnc	Nyarko Veronica	68	0.18
Gcpp	Fosuah Rita	44	0.11

== See also ==
- List of Ghana Parliament constituencies
- List of political parties in Ghana
