= Agricultural Development Bank of Ghana =

Ghanaian bank

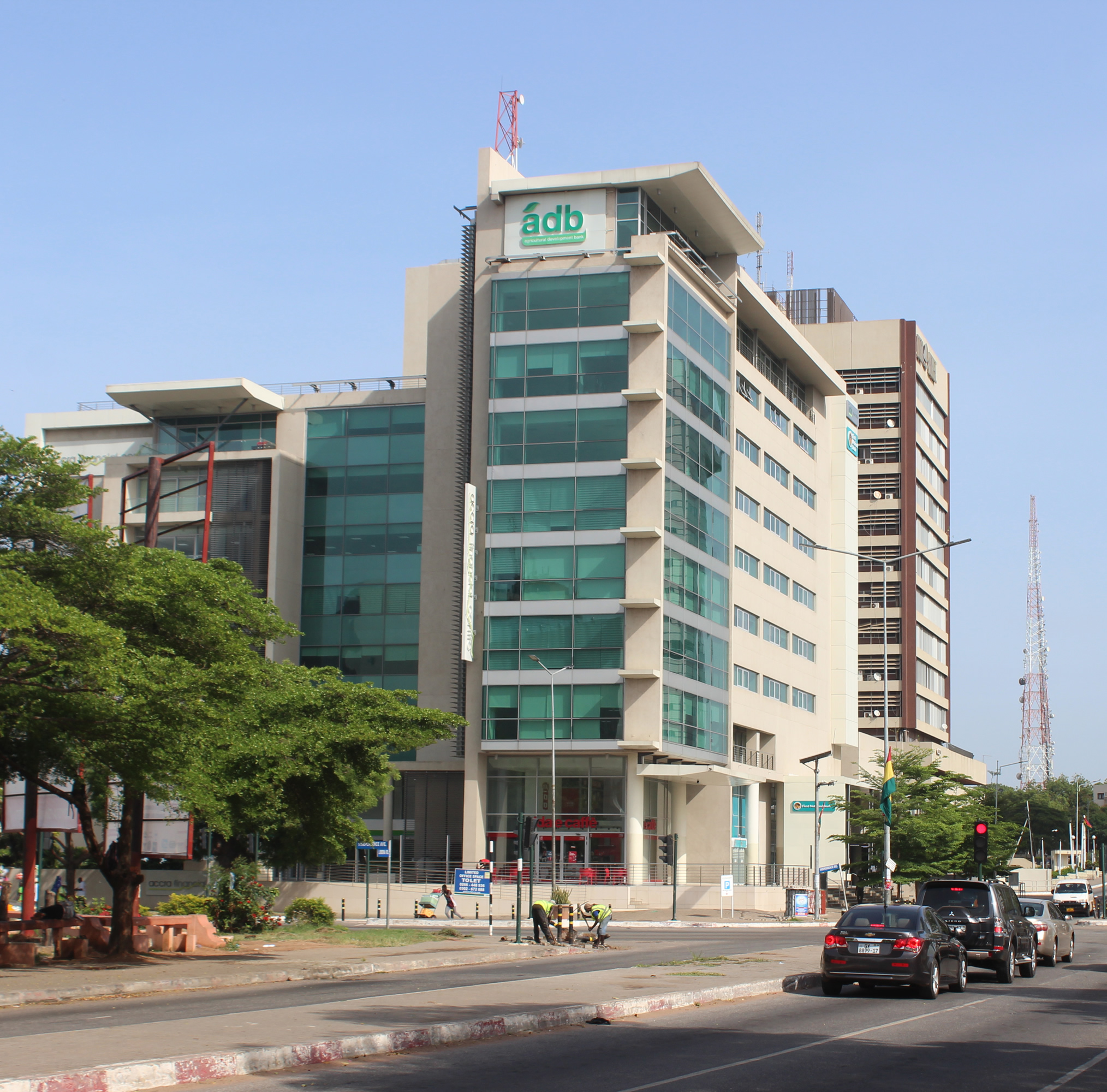
- Type: Parastatal
- Industry: Finance
- Founded: 1965; 61 years ago
- Headquarters: Independence Avenue, Accra, Ghana
- Key people: Alex Bernasko, chairman Alhassan Yakubu-Tali, managing director
- Products: Loans, agricultural credit, corporate banking, international banking, commercial banking
- Revenue: ▲Pretax: US$28.8 million (GHS: 51.1 million) (2011)
- Total assets: US$683.6 million (GHS: 1.21 billion) (2011)
- Owner: Government of Ghana
- Website: agricbank.com

Agricultural Development Bank of Ghana, commonly known as Agricultural Development Bank or ADB, is a government-owned development and commercial bank in Ghana. The bank is the first development finance institution established by the Government of Ghana. It is the developmental finance institution that provides technical and financial services to agribusiness, farmers, and other enterprises at the rural communities. It is one of the commercial banks licensed by the Bank of Ghana, the national banking regulator.

The main objective of the bank is promoting and financing of agribusiness in the country.

== History ==
ADB was established in 1965, by the Act of Parliament (Act 286) as the Agricultural Credit and Cooperative Bank. This is to meet the banking needs of the Ghanaian agricultural sector in a profitable manner. The bank started operations from a building on Tunisia Road, West Ridge - Accra. The bank changed its name in 1970 when the parliamentary statute was amended to grant the institution full commercial banking powers.

In 1967, the National Liberation Council (NLC Decree 182) renamed it from the Agricultural Credit and Cooperative Bank to the Agricultural Development Bank, and amended key sections of the Establishing Act, Act 286.

By 1990, the bank became more diversified and added international banking and trade services to its growing product portfolio. The bank obtained the Universal Banking license and broadened its services in 2004.

In 2011 the branch network of the bank expanded from 55 to 78 branches across the country, with fully networked branches running on an ICT platform. Around the same time, the bank introduced the ADB Visa Classic Card, allowing cardholders to transact business anywhere in the world.

== Overview ==
The bank is a large development and commercial bank. As of April 2010, ADB was the leading financial institution in agricultural financing in Ghana, responsible for 35% of the total bank industry financing of agriculture. In September 2010, the bank was recognized as Bank of the Year at the Africa Investor Agribusiness Awards, in Durban, South Africa, the first institution so recognized by this annual event. The total assets of the institution at the end of December 2011 were valued at approximately US$683.6 million (GHS: 1.21 billion).

The bank is currently looking to list on the Ghana Stock Exchange, and is awaiting government approval to be listed.

== Ownership ==
The bank's stock is owned by the following entities:

Agricultural Development Bank of Ghana stock ownership

| Rank | Name of owner | Percentage ownership |
|---|---|---|
| 1 | Government of Ghana | 51.83 |
| 2 | Bank of Ghana | 48.17 |
| | Total | 100.00 |

== Products and services ==
The bank engages in other types of banking in addition to making agricultural loans. The range of services offered include development banking, corporate banking, personal banking, international banking, diaspora banking services, treasury management services, and money transfer services, in partnership with Western Union.

== Branch network ==
The bank maintains a network of 85 branches located in all areas of Ghana.

== Awards and recognition ==
- 2020 Ghana Cocoa Awards - Best Cocoa Financing Institution

== See also ==
- Economy of Ghana
- List of banks in Ghana
- List of national development banks
