= National Investment Bank =

Ghanaian bank

National Investment Bank Ghana Limited

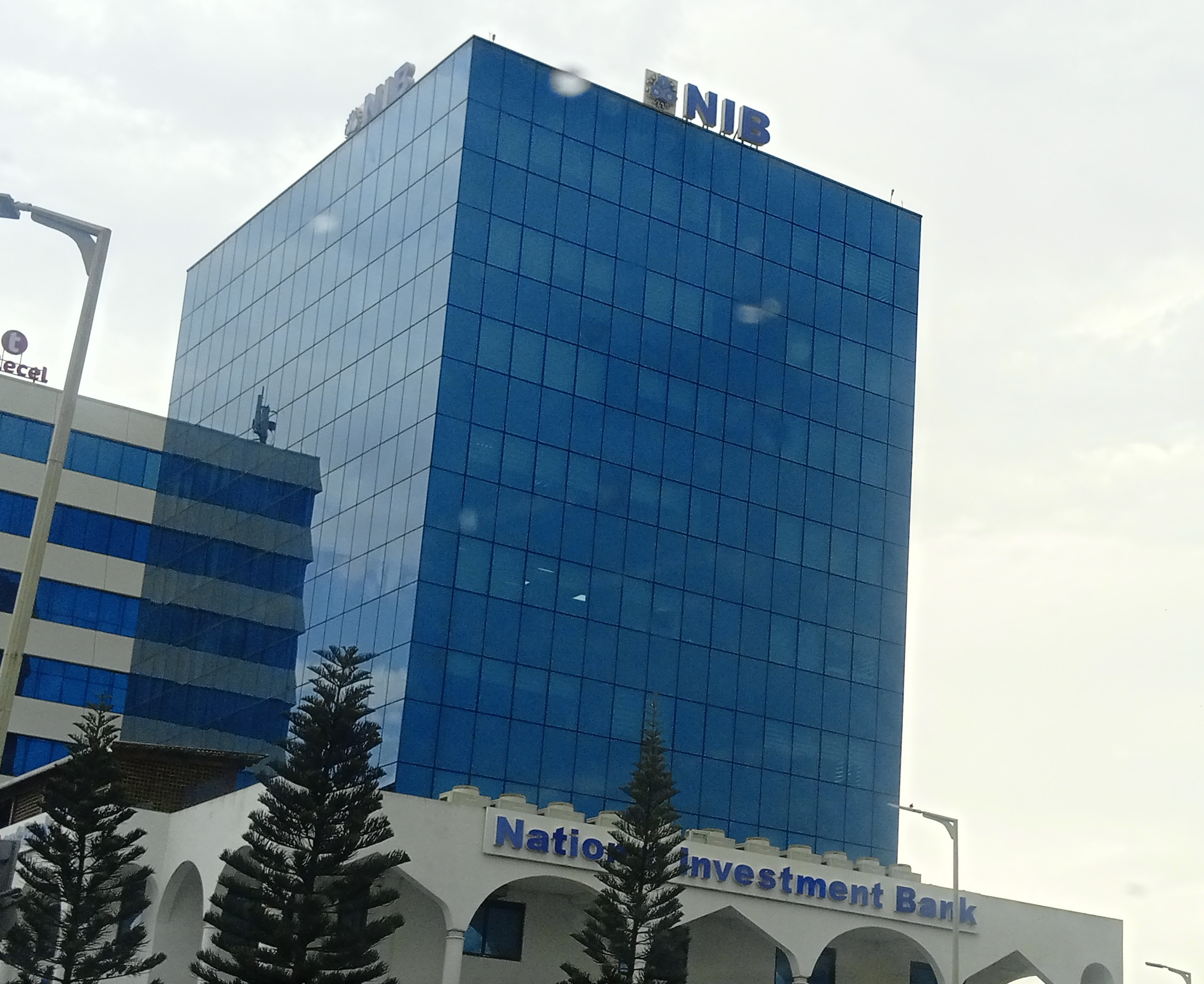
- Type: Private company, Parastatal
- Industry: Financial services
- Founded: 1963; 63 years ago
- Headquarters: Accra, Ghana
- Number of locations: 52 branches
- Key people: Mr. Frank Brako Adu Jr. Chief Dr. Doli-Wura Awushi Abdul-Malik Seidu Zakaria; Managing Director
- Products: Loans, Savings, Checking, Investments, Debit Cards, Credit Cards, Mortgages
- Revenue: ▲:Aftertax:US$4 million (GHS:7.5 million) (2011)
- Total assets: US$468.5+ million (GHS:878.9 million) (2011)
- Website: www.nib.com.gh

National Investment Bank, normally abbreviated to NIB, is a state owned commercial bank in Ghana. It is one of the commercial banks licensed by the Bank of Ghana, the national banking regulator. NIB was form to promote industrialization of all sectors in the country. It has undergone management and financial restructure to help it attain higher financial levels across the world.

NIB is a medium-sized financial services provider in Ghana. As of December 2011, the total valuation of the bank's assets was approximately US$468.5 million (GHS:878.9 million), with shareholders' equity of approximately US$47 million (GHS:88.1 million).

== History ==
The bank was established by the Government of Ghana in 1963, as a national development bank. Later, the bank was granted a commercial banking license by the Bank of Ghana, the national banking regulator.

In 2021, the government entrusted NIB Bank with a vital mission: to establish Ghana as the industrial hub of Africa. Hon Ken Ofori-Atta, in a statement to the NIB, encouraged the bank's Board of Directors to put in the effort needed to transform the bank into a profitable national asset. In 2020, the bank received a significant infusion of GHC 800 million to bolster its capital position. However, NIB could not meet its objective.

In July 2023, the bank underwent a comprehensive review to evaluate its sustainability as a state-owned financial institution. Dr. Ernest Addison highlighted that the bank, along with several other financial institutions, grappled with the challenge of being under-capitalized. This issue was part of the broader financial sector cleanup carried out in 2022.

The Government of Ghana contemplated a strategic move, suggesting that ADB might assume control of NIB to initiate a restructuring process. This decision arose from NIB's ongoing struggle to achieve profitability, leading to the realization that the government couldn't sustainably fund the bank any longer.

The decision has faced criticism from the minority group in parliament. They argue that since the Government already holds a majority stake of over 60% in ADB, the move to have ADB take over NIB raises concerns and questions about the practicality of the decision.

== Branch network ==
As of September 2017, the bank maintains a network of 53 branches and 3 Agencies.

== Products ==
1. Retail banking 2. SME banking 3. Corporate banking 4. Digital banking 5. Treasury service and investments 6. International trade and payments.

== See also ==
- List of banks in Ghana
- Economy of Ghana
