= List of alumni of the Accra Academy =

An alumnus of the Accra Academy is referred to as a Bleoobi.

== Academia ==
=== Natural and Applied Sciences ===
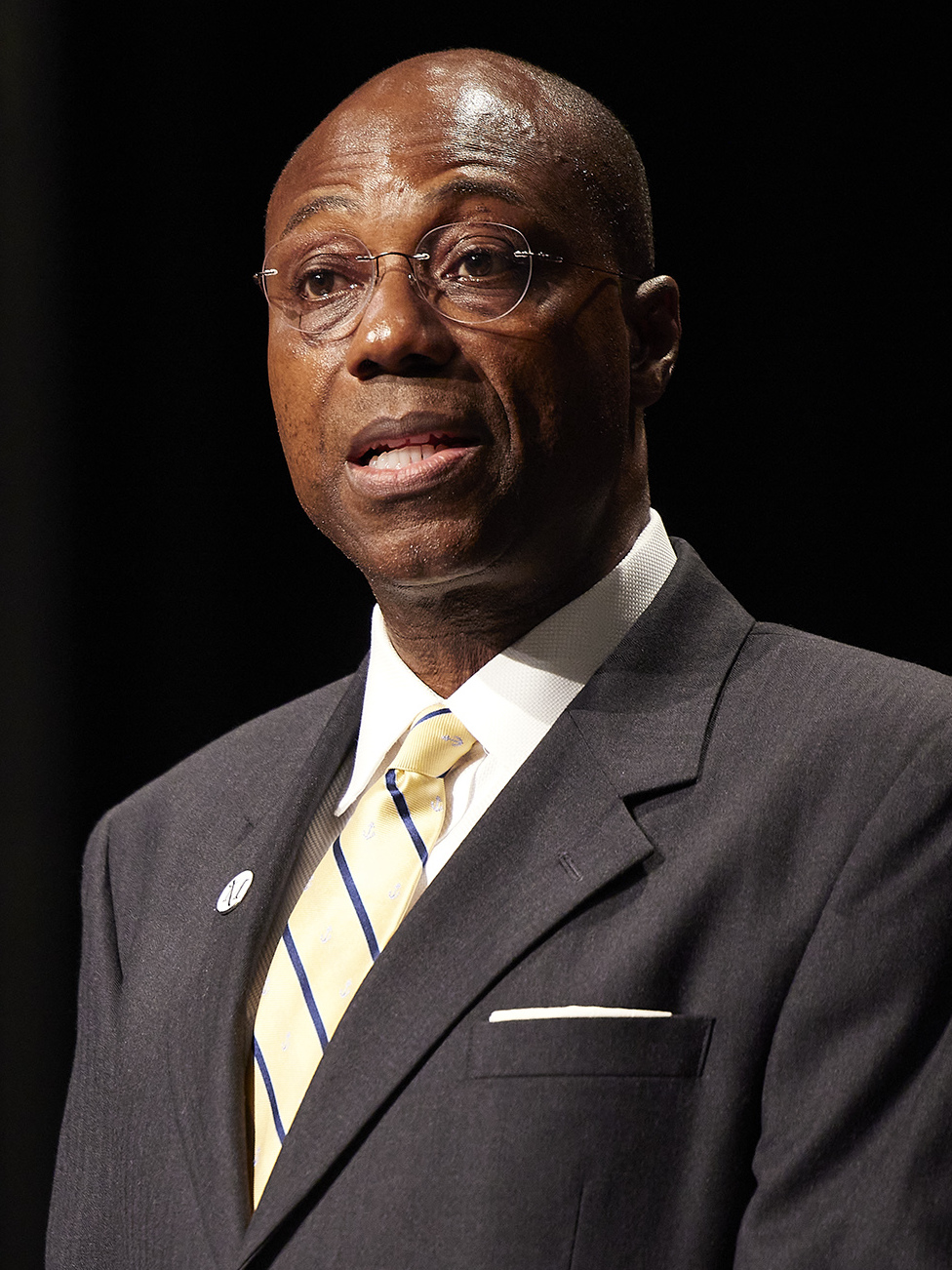
Daniel Asua Wubah, president of Millersville University of Pennsylvania

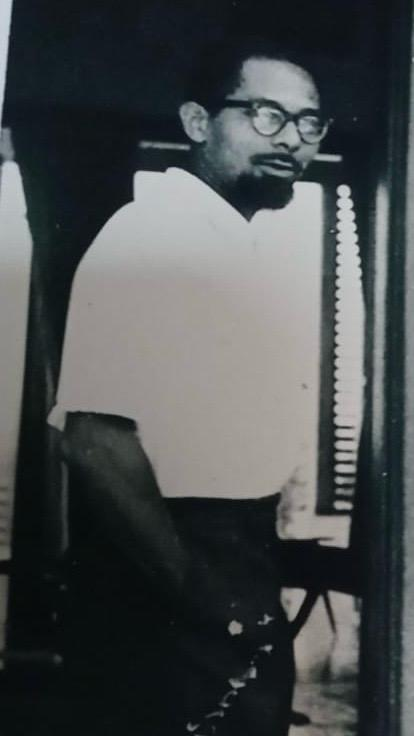
Frank Gibbs Torto, foundation member and later president of the Ghana Academy of Arts and Sciences

- David Acquaye FGA (Bleoo '48), soil scientist, former dean of faculty of agriculture at University of Ghana
- James Adjaye (Bleoo ‘78), genetic scientist, research scientist at Max Planck Institute for Molecular Genetics
- T. Q. Armar (Bleoo '36), Ghanaian educationist and publisher
- Richmond Aryeetey FGA (Bleoo '93), nutritionist
- Edwin Asomaning FGA (Bleoo '50), plant pathologist; former director of the Cocoa Research Institute of Ghana
- Michael McClelland (Bleoo '72), Professor of Microbiology and Genetics at the University of California, Irvine
- Richard Damoah (Bleoo '96), physicist and research scientist at NASA Goddard Space Flight Center
- George Odamtten FGA (Bleoo '67), mycologist, former dean of faculty of science at University of Ghana
- J. K. Okine (Bleoo ‘45), mathematician, headmaster of Accra Academy (1967-1986)
- Richard Orraca-Tetteh (Bleoo '51), nutritionist
- Frank Gibbs Torto FGA (Bleoo '36) (foundation student), chemist, first Ghanaian lecturer of the University of Ghana foundation member and later president of the Ghana Academy of Arts and Sciences
- Daniel A. Wubah (Bleoo '77), Microbiologist, Current president of Millersville University of Pennsylvania
- Abdul-Aziz Yakubu, (Bleoo '77), mathematician

=== Humanities and Social sciences ===
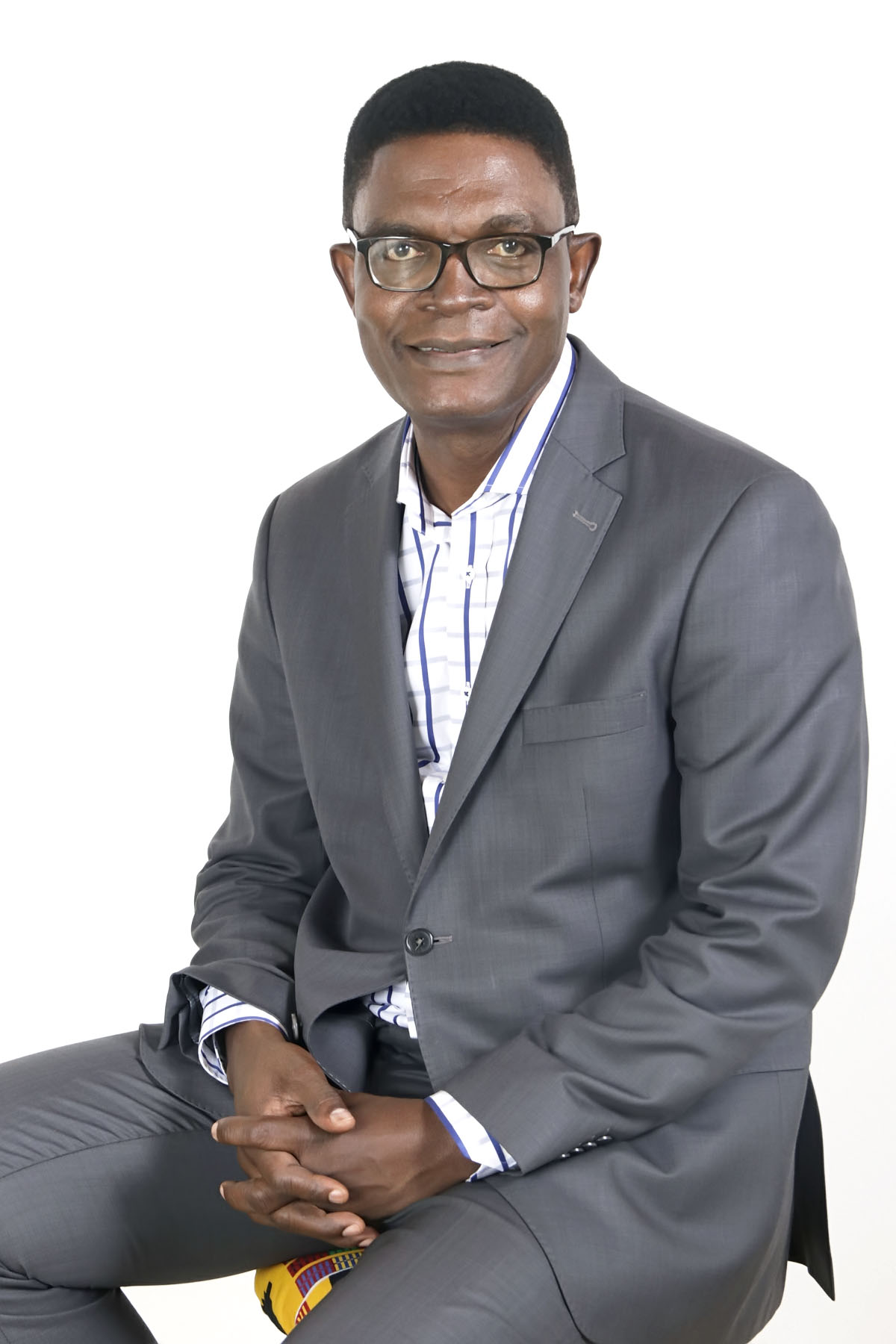
Emmanuel Akwetey, political & governance analyst

- Robert Addo-Fening (Bleoo '53), historian
- Emmanuel Akwetey, political & governance analyst, executive director of the Institute for Democratic Governance (IDEG)
- Frank Baffoe (Bleoo ‘52), economist
- H. C. Ayikwei Bulley (Bleoo '44), social scientist; pioneer of the study of psychology in Ghana
- V.C.R.A.C. Crabbe FGA (Bleoo '43), Legal scholar and law professor
- Vincent Birch Freeman (Bleoo ‘56), headmaster of Accra Academy (1986-1996)
- Peter Quartey FGA (Bleoo '87), economist
- Kwadzo Senanu (Bleoo '51) Professor of English, Pro-Vice Chancellor (1981-1983) & acting Vice Chancellor of University of Ghana (1983-1985)

=== Medical and Health Sciences ===
- Joseph Kpakpo Acquaye (Bleoo '57), Professor of Haematology, former Medical Administrator of Korle-Bu Teaching Hospital, president of the West African College of Physicians (2003–2004)
- Hutton Ayikwei Addy (Bleoo '50), Professor of Public Health, first Dean of the Medical School of the University for Development Studies, founding academic staff of the Kwame Nkrumah University of Science and Technology School of Medical Sciences
- Rexford S. Ahima (Bleoo ‘76;'78), Bloomberg Distinguished Professor and Director of the Division of Endocrinology, Diabetes and Metabolism, Johns Hopkins University School of Medicine
- Reginald Ansa-Asamoah, Professor of Pharmacology; Pro-Vice Chancellor of the Kwame Nkrumah University of Science and Technology
- Emmanuel Quaye Archampong FGA (Bleoo '51), Emeritus Professor at the Department of Surgery and former Dean of the University of Ghana Medical School, president of the West African College of Surgeons (1997–1999)
- Jacob Amekor Blukoo-Allotey (Bleoo '48), physician; pioneer in pharmacology studies at the University of Ghana Medical School
- Alex Dodoo (Bleoo '83), professor at the Centre for Tropical Clinical Pharmacology, University of Ghana Medical School
- J. F. O. Mustaffah (Bleoo '50), first Ghanaian neurosurgeon
- Nii Otu Nartey (Bleoo '73), Professor of Oral Pathology, first Dean of the University of Ghana Dental School, Chief Administrator of the Korle-Bu Teaching Hospital (2009-2013)
- Isaac Odame (Bleoo '74), Professor of Haematology, Medical Director of the Global Sickle Cell Disease Network
- Jacob Plange-Rhule (Bleoo '76;’78), formerly Rector of the Ghana College of Physicians and Surgeons, and president of the Ghana Medical Association
- Cornelius Odarquaye Quarcoopome (Bleoo '43), Professor of ophthalmology, first Ghanaian eye specialist, president of the Ghana Medical Association (1978-1980) and first director of the Noguchi Memorial Institute for Medical Research

== The Arts ==
=== Actors ===
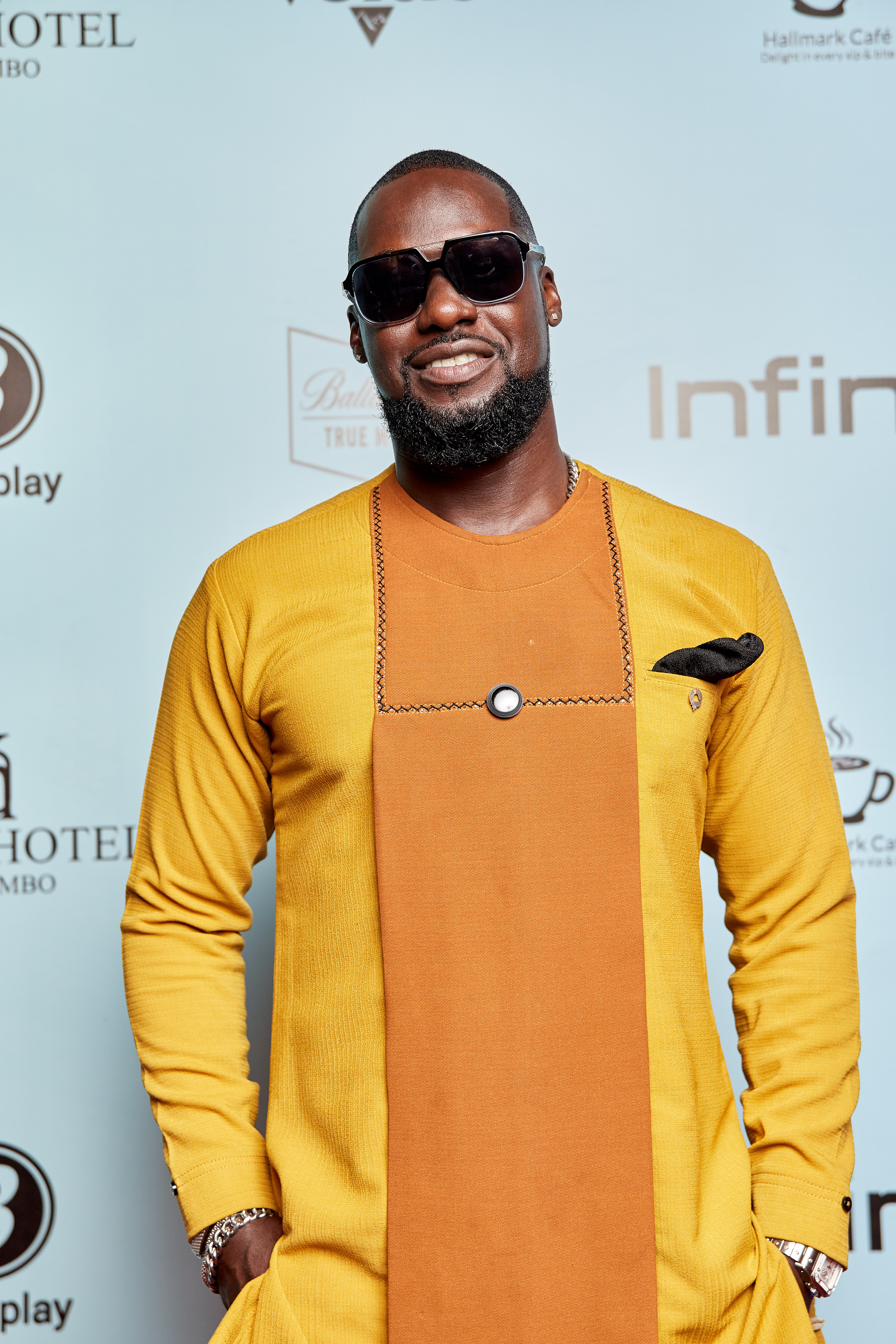
Chris Attoh, Actor and TV personality

- Chris Attoh (Bleoo '96), actor, television presenter, producer and model

=== Artists ===
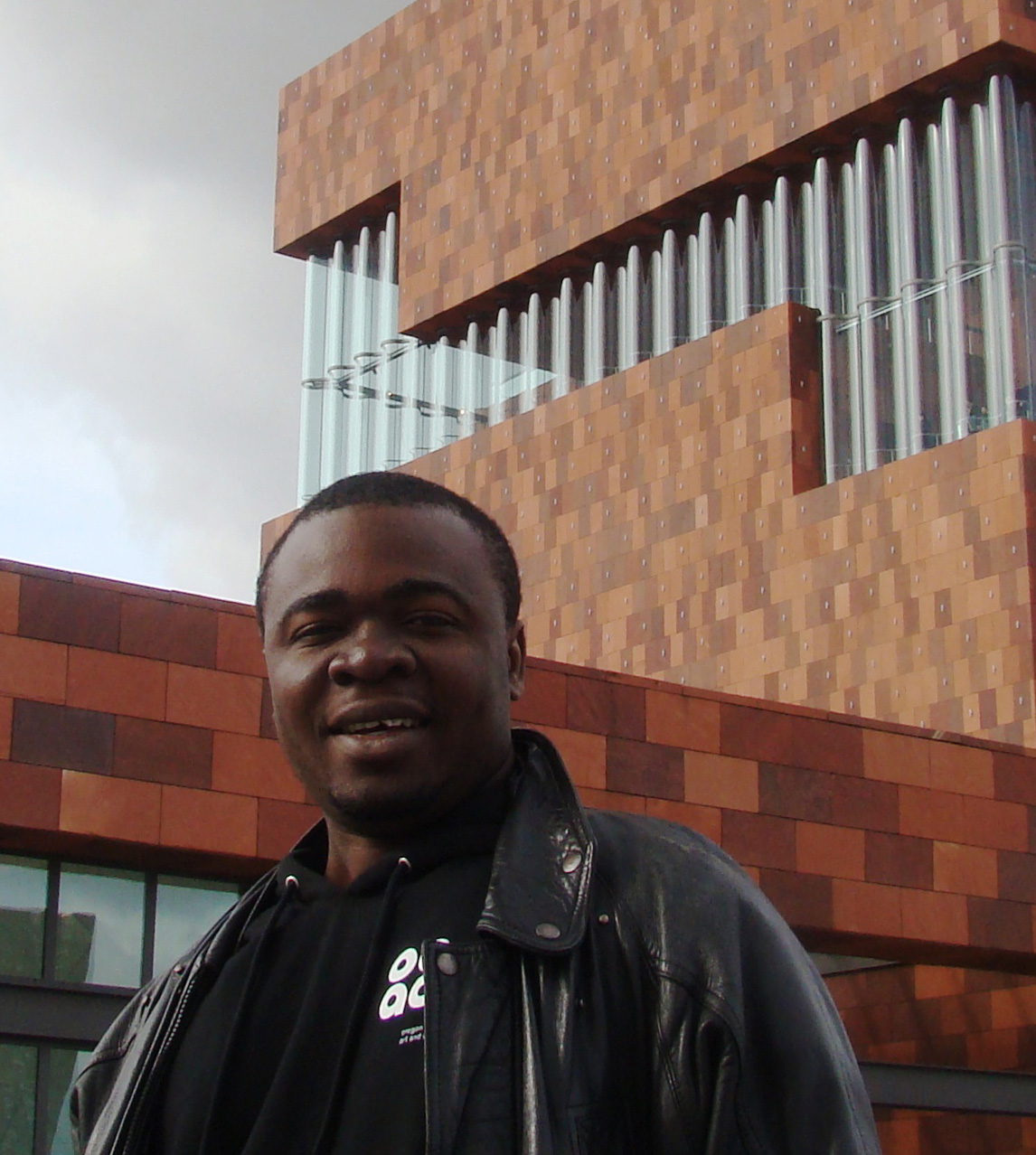
Eric Adjetey Anang, Sculptor

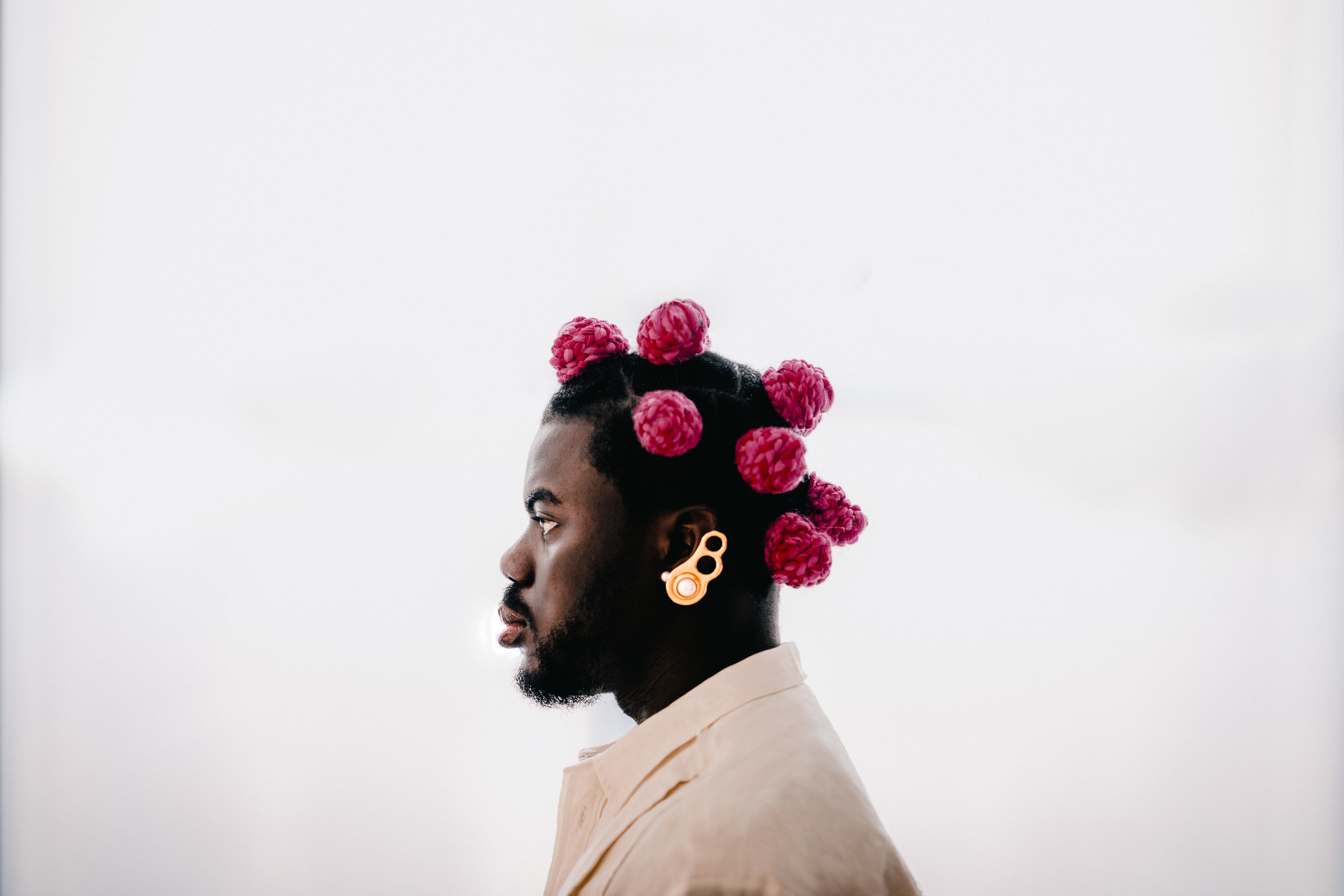
Prince Gyasi, Visual Artist

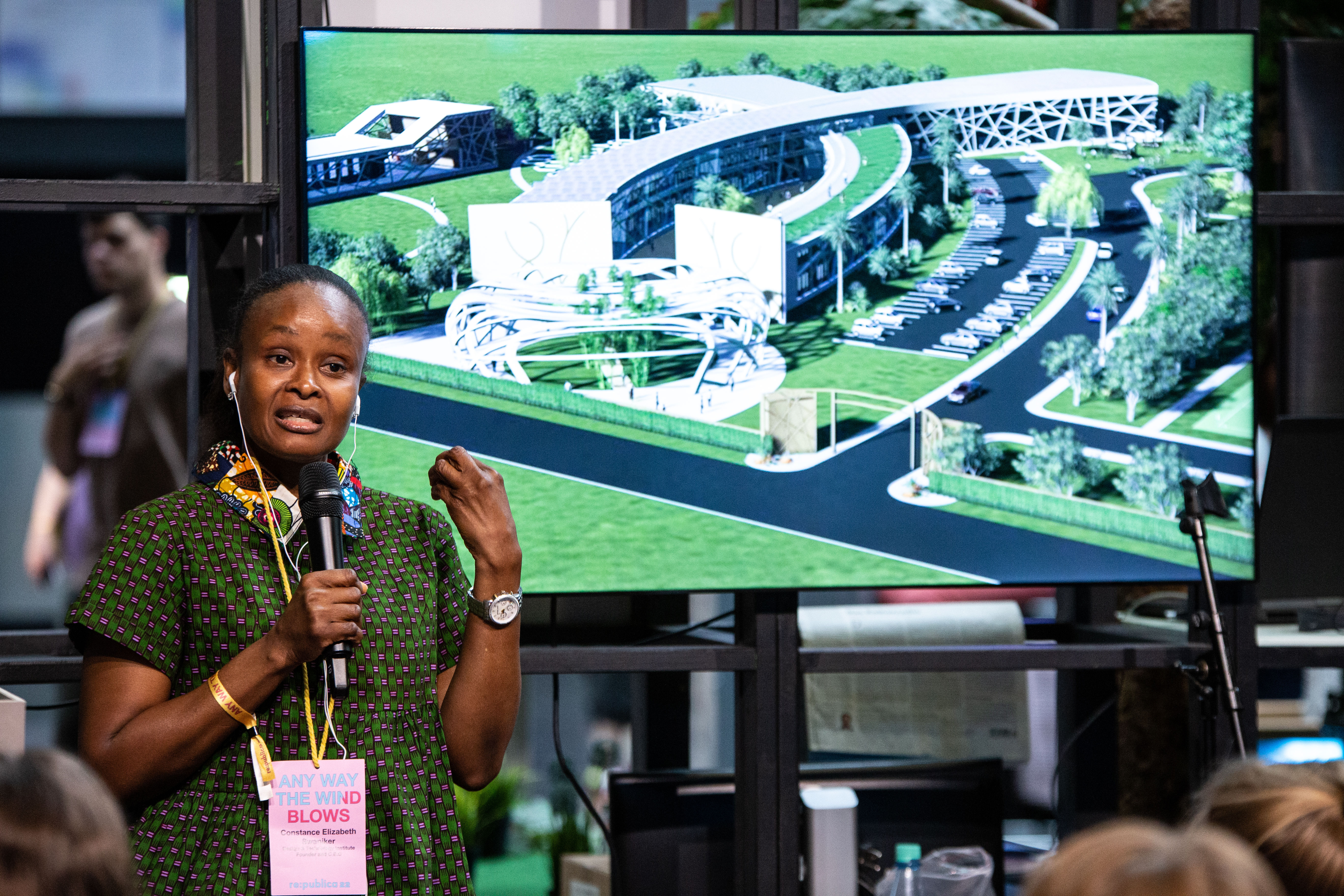
Constance Swaniker, Sculptor

- Bright Tetteh Ackwerh (Bleoo '06), Satirical Artist
- Eric Adjetey Anang (Bleoo '05), Sculptor
- Prince Gyasi (Bleoo '13), Visual Artist
- Ray Styles (Bleoo '06), Pencil artist
- Constance Swaniker (Bleoo '93), Sculptor

=== Literature ===
- Amu Djoleto, author of The Strange Man (1967), Money Galore (1975), and Hurricane of Dust (1987), among many other novels, short stories, and poems
- Ellis Ayitey Komey, Ghanaian writer and poet
- Kwei Quartey (Bleoo '73), Ghanaian American novelist and surgeon
- Rex Quartey (Bleoo '63), Ghanaian writer and poet

=== Music ===
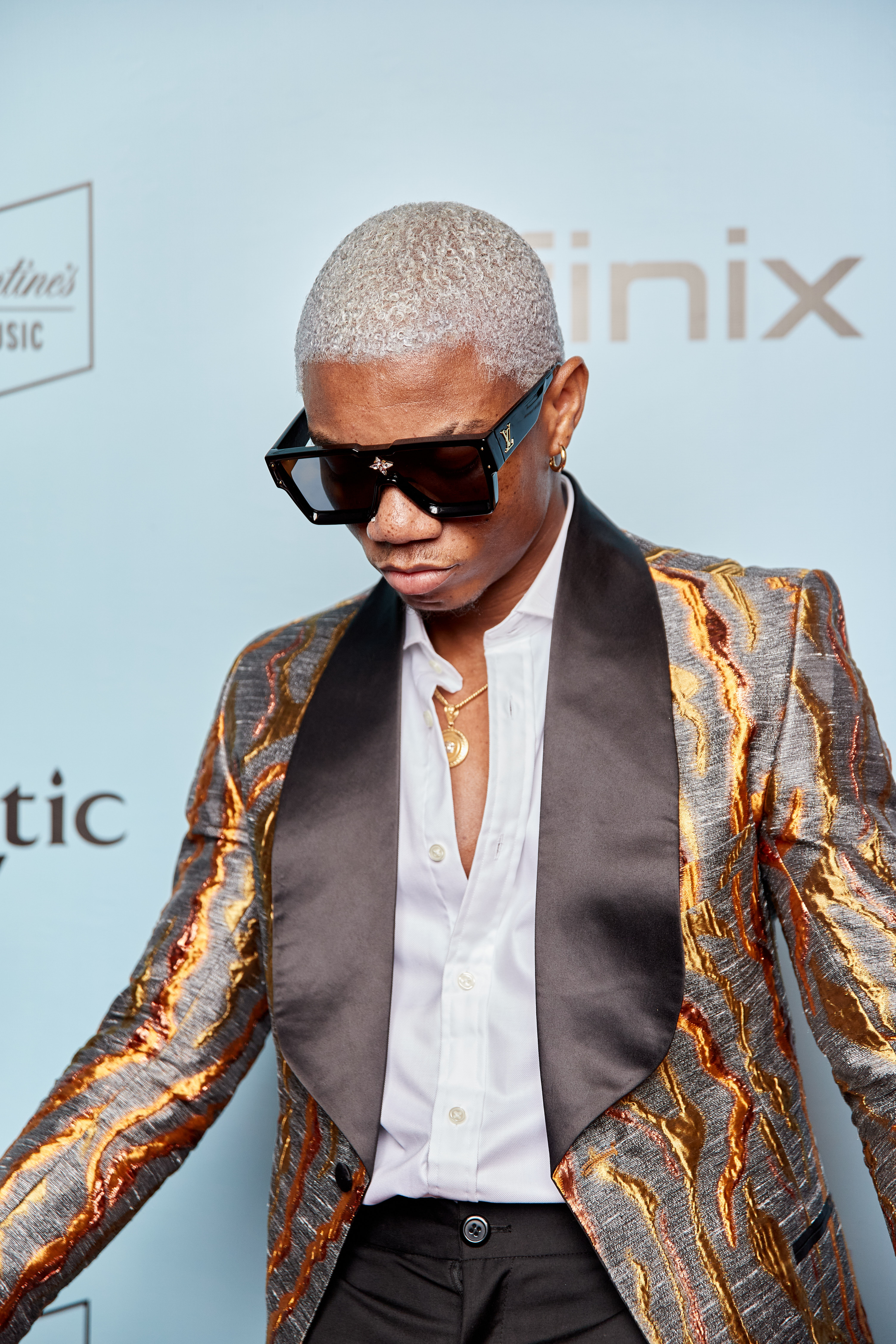
KiDi, musician

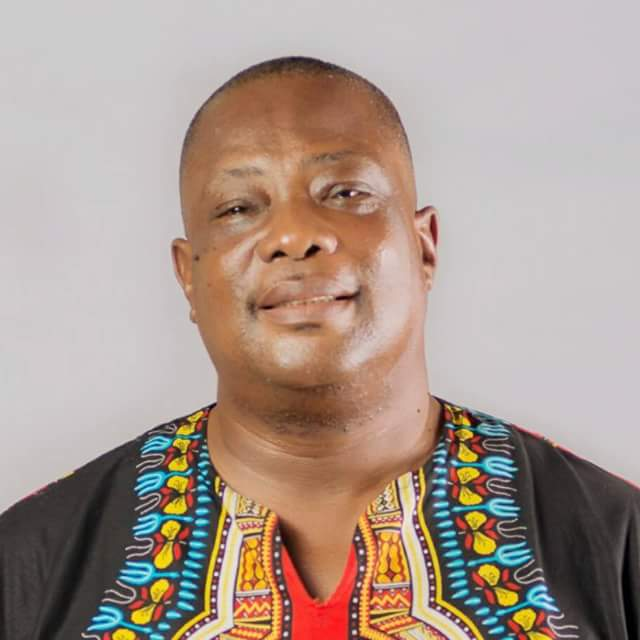
Zapp Mallet, Sound Engineer

- Nana Kofi Asihene, Music video director
- Gafacci (Bleoo '06), sound engineer
- Jerry Hansen (Bleoo '47), musician, founder of the Ramblers International Band, first president of the Musicians Union of Ghana (MUSIGA)
- KiDi (Bleoo '12), musician
- King of Accra (Bleoo '05), sound engineer
- Zapp Mallet (Bleoo '82), sound engineer
- Danny Nettey (Bleoo '88), musician
- Scientific, musician
- Reggie Zippy (Bleoo '03), musician

== Entrepreneurs and business leaders ==
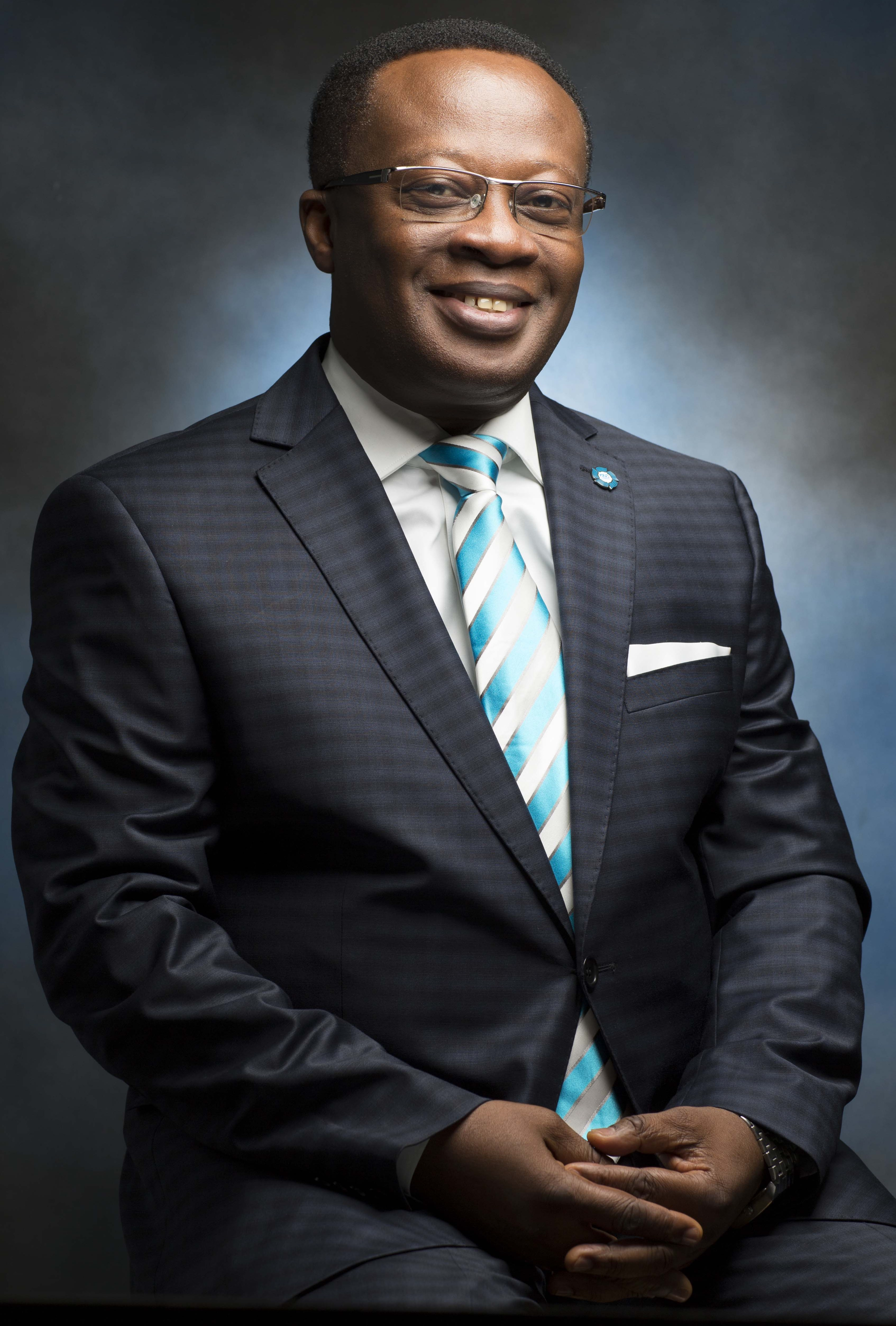
Felix Nyarko-Pong, Banker

- Felix E. Addo (Bleoo '73), chairman of Guinness Ghana Breweries, former Country Senior Partner of PwC Ghana
- Daniel Wilson Addo (Bleoo '85) banker; managing director of CBG
- Nathan Kwabena Adisi (aka Bola Ray) (Bleoo '96), entertainment and media entrepreneur; CEO of EIB Network Group
- Nana Awuah Darko Ampem I (Bleoo '51), founder of Vanguard Assurance,co-founder of CALbank
- T. E. Anin (Bleoo '51), managing director and chairman of the board of directors of the Ghana Commercial Bank (1972–1980)
- Hilary Denise Arko-Dadzie (Bleoo '90), business executive at ARIPO
- Nana Kwame Bediako, real-estate entrepreneur
- Sulemanu Koney, CEO of the Ghana Chamber of Mines and the executive director of the ECOWAS Federation of Chambers of Mines.[1][2][3]
- Solomon Lartey (Bleoo '93), former CEO of Activa International Insurance
- Tei Mante (Bleoo '66), former director and vice-chairman of Ecobank Transnational
- Felix Nyarko-Pong (Bleoo '78), former CEO of uniBank
- Emmanuel Noi Omaboe (Bleoo '50), former chairman & managing director of E.N. Omaboe & Associates
- Julian Opuni (Bleoo '90), banker; managing director of Fidelity Bank
- John Kobina Richardson (Bleoo '55), former chairman & managing director of Pioneer Tobacco
- Godfrey Gaoseb Former Director(executive) of the world bank

== Journalists and media personalities ==
=== News agencies & Newspapers ===
- Goodwin Tutum Anim (Bleoo '50), first African General Manager of the Ghana News Agency
- Ben Ephson (Bleoo '75), founder and Managing Editor of the Daily Dispatch (1997–)
- Eric Kwame Heymann, (Bleoo '47), first Editor-in-chief of the Accra Evening News

=== Radio & Television ===
- Francis Abban, journalist, host of Starr FM's Morning Show and host of State of Affairs on GHOne TV.
- Randy Abbey (Bleoo '92), host of Good Morning Ghana on Metro TV
- Dela Ahiawor, sports journalist, editor-at-large at Sports24ghana.com
- Earl Ankrah (Bleoo '88), broadcast journalist and former host of GTV's Breakfast Show
- Brown Berry, Host of Weekend Rush on YFM
- Solomon Joojo Cobbinah, investigative journalist
- Manuel Koranteng (Bleoo '15), journalist at the British Broadcasting Corporation (BBC)
- Joe Lartey Snr. a.k.a. 'Over To You' Joe Lartey, formerly of GBC Sports and Federal Radio Corporation of Nigeria (FRCN), Ranked amongst the top five African football commentators by Goal.
- Israel Laryea (Bleoo '94), broadcast journalist, news editor and anchor, programme host at Multimedia Group Limited.
- Bola Ray (Bleoo '96), host of Starr Chat on Starr FM, host of Revealed With Bola Ray

== Law ==
=== Attorneys-General ===
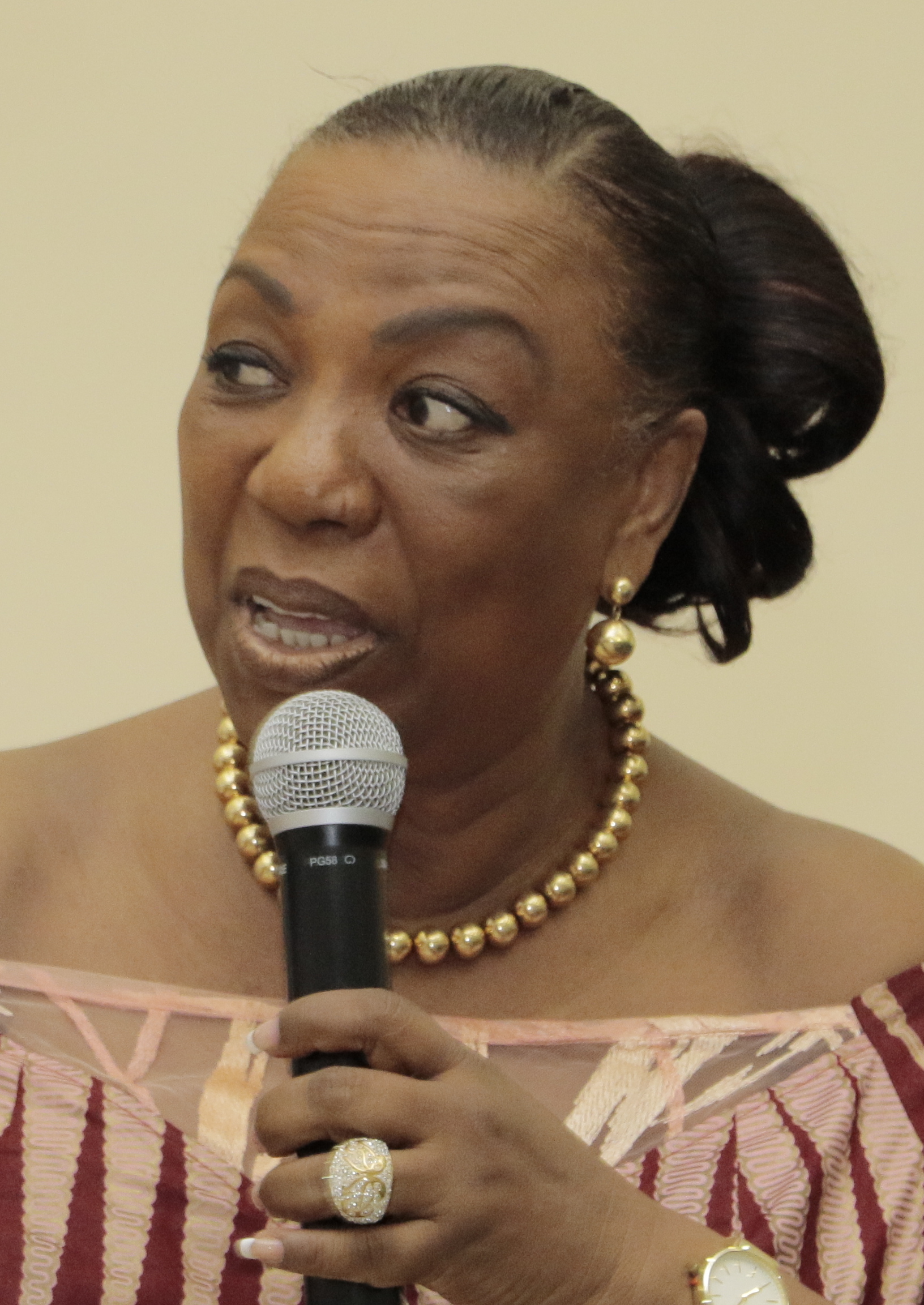
Betty Mould-Iddrisu, first female Attorney General of Ghana

- Nicholas Yaw Boafo Adade (Bleoo '46), Attorney General of Ghana in the NLC and the Busia government (1969–1971)
- Gustav Koranteng-Addow (Bleoo '39), former appeal court judge and former Attorney General of Ghana in the SMC government (1975–1979)
- George Commey Mills-Odoi (Bleoo '37), first Ghanaian Attorney General of the Republic of Ghana (1960–1961)
- Betty Mould-Iddrisu (Bleoo '73), first female Attorney General of Ghana (2009–2011)

=== Supreme Court Judges ===
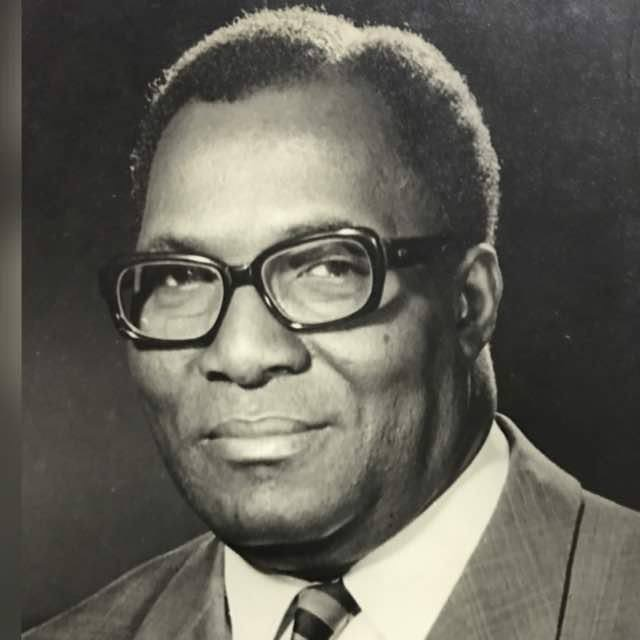
Samuel Azu Crabbe, 5th Chief Justice of Ghana

- Nicholas Yaw Boafo Adade (Bleoo '46), Justice of the Supreme Court of Ghana (1989–1996) and Acting Chief Justice of Ghana (1990–1991)
- Fred Kwasi Apaloo (Bleoo '42), 6th Chief Justice of Ghana (1977–1986) and 8th Chief Justice of Kenya (1993–1995)
- Samuel Kwame Adibu Asiedu (Bleoo '83), Active Justice of the Supreme Court of Ghana (2022–date)
- Samuel Azu Crabbe (Bleoo '39), Justice of the East African Court of Appeal (1963–1965) and 5th Chief Justice of Ghana (1973–1977)
- V.C.R.A.C. Crabbe (Bleoo '43), Justice of the Supreme Court of Ghana (1970–1972) and (1979–1981)
- Jones Victor Mawulorm Dotse (Bleoo '72), Justice of the Supreme Court of Ghana (2008–2003)
- George Lamptey (Bleoo '51), Justice of the Supreme Court of Ghana (2000–2002)
- George Commey Mills-Odoi (Bleoo '37), Justice of the Supreme Court of Ghana (1964–1966) and Acting Chief Justice of Ghana (July 1965)
- Walter Samuel Nkanu Onnoghen (Bleoo '72), 15th Chief Justice of Nigeria (2017–2019)

==== Other legal figures ====
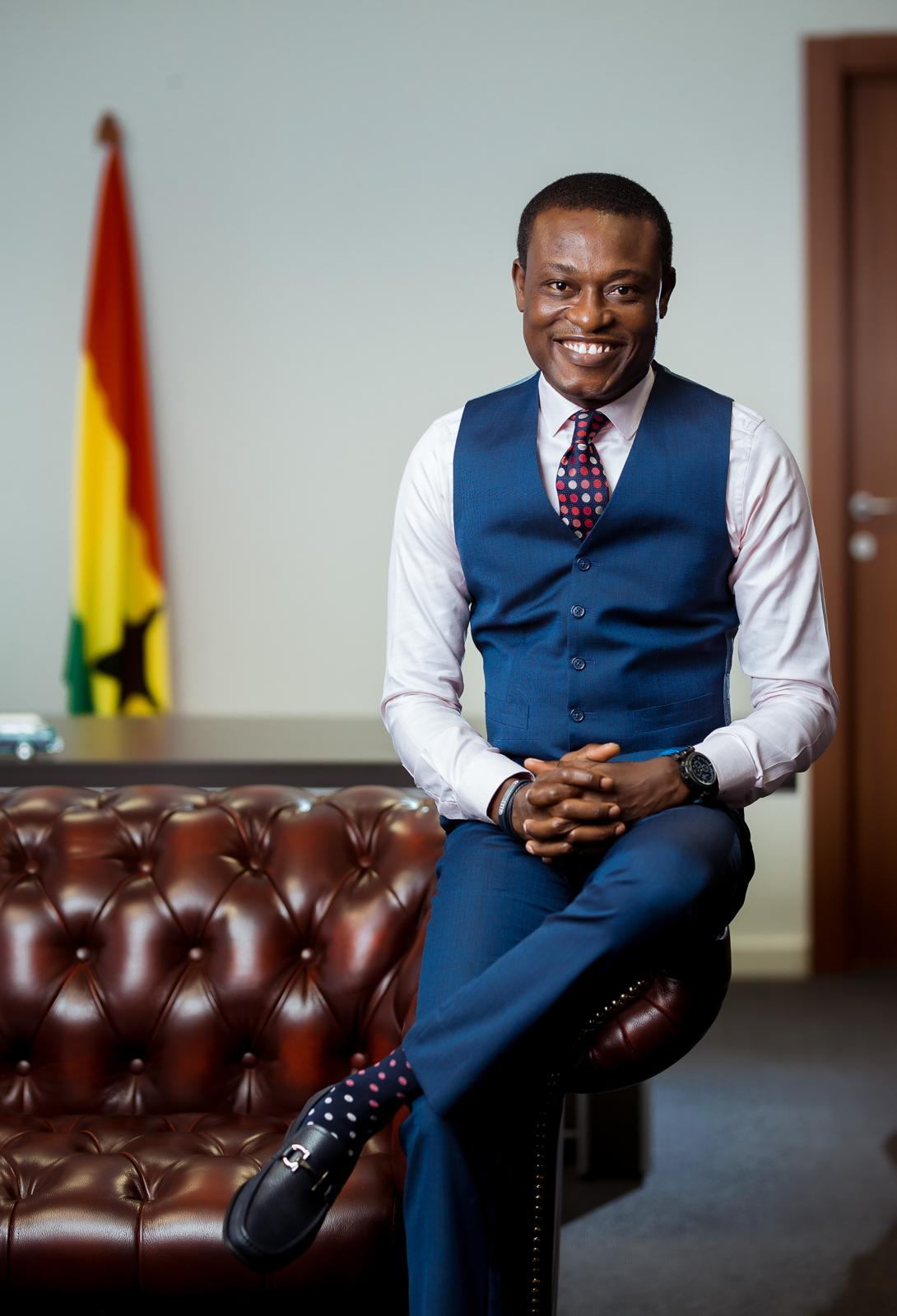
Kissi Agyebeng, Special Prosecutor

- Kofi Acquah-Dadzie (Bleoo '64), Former Justice of the High Court of Botswana (Assistant Registrar and Master)
- Emmanuel Akwei Addo (Bleoo '62), Justice of the Court of Appeal (2002–2007); Solicitor-General (1998-2002); and member of the International Law Commission (1997–2006)
- Kissi Agyebeng (Bleoo '96), Special Prosecutor (2021–)
- Frederick Bruce-Lyle (Bleoo '72), High Court Judge of the Eastern Caribbean Supreme Court (1999-2016)
- Lebrecht James Chinery-Hesse, Chief Parliamentary Draftsman, and former Solicitor-General

== Military ==
=== Army ===
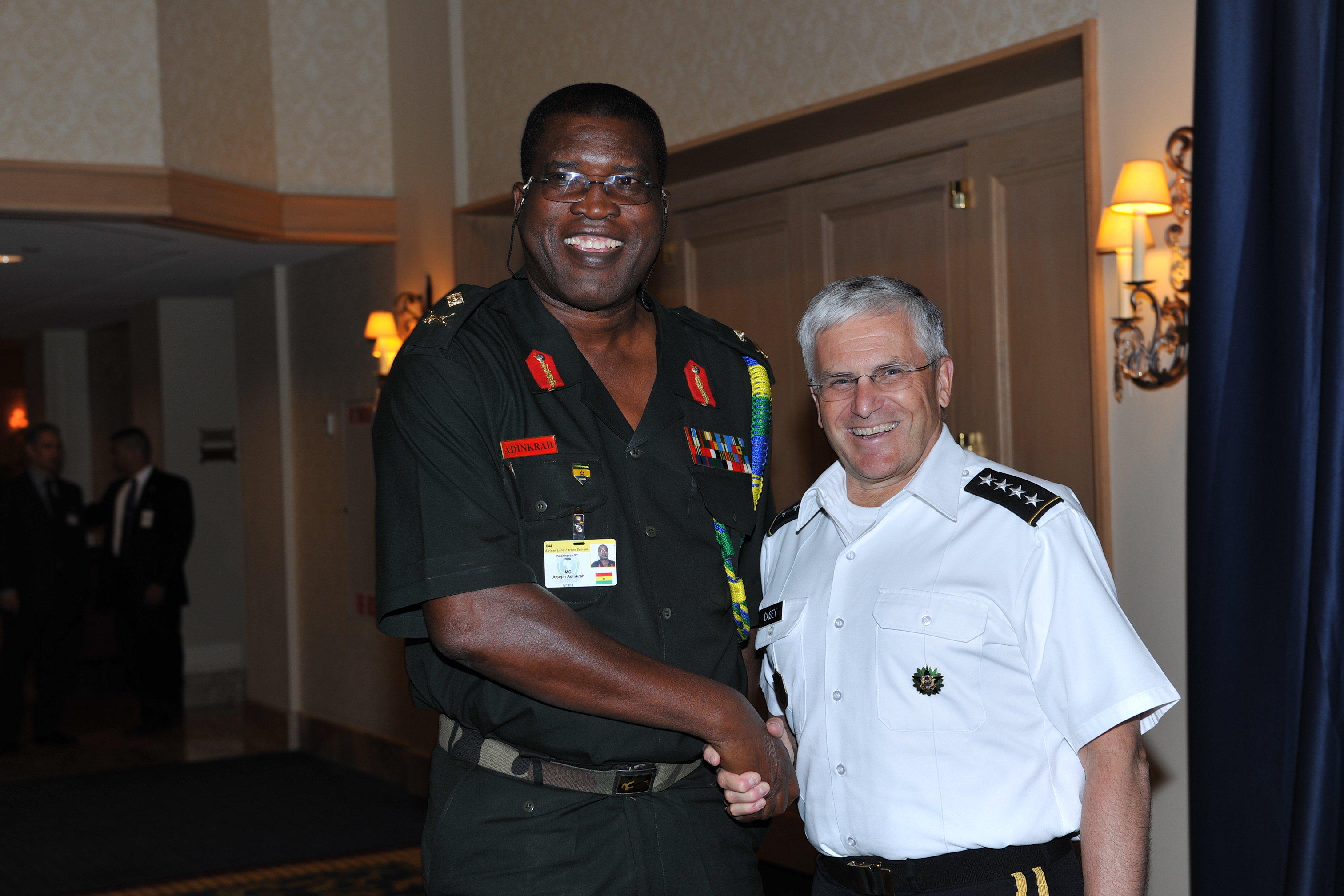
Joseph Narh Adinkra; Chief of the Army Staff, 2009–2013

- Joseph Narh Adinkrah (Bleoo '70), Chief of the Army Staff, 2009–2013
- Joseph Arthur Ankrah (Bleoo '37), first Commander of the Ghana Army (First Ghanaian Chief of the Army Staff) (1961–1962), Chief of the Defence Staff (1967–1968)
- Neville Alexander Odartey-Wellington (Bleoo '54), Chief of the Army Staff, 1978–1979

=== Navy ===
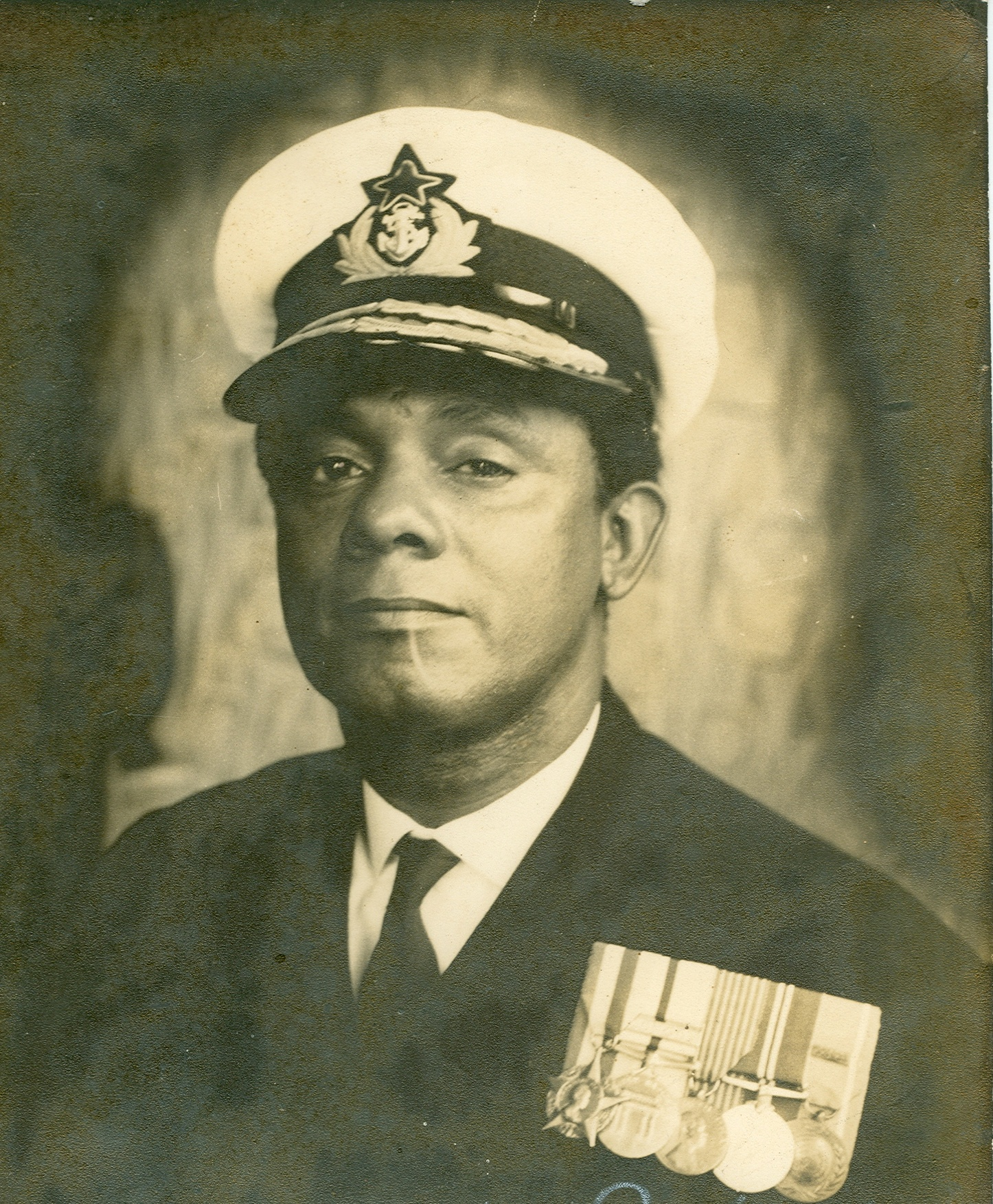
David Animle Hansen– first Ghanaian Chief of Naval Staff

- David Animle Hansen (Bleoo '42), first Commander of the Ghana Navy (first Ghanaian Chief of the Naval Staff), instrumental in establishing and expanding the Ghana Navy

=== Air Force ===
- Frederick Asare Kwasi Bekoe (Bleoo '85), Chief of Air Staff (2023–2025)
- Samuel Gyabaah (Bleoo '61), Chief of Air Staff (June 1979–July 1979)
- Joshua Lartei Mensah-Larkai (Bleoo '86), Chief of Staff of the General Headquarters of the Ghana Armed Forces (2025–present)

=== Border Guards ===
- Edward Kwaku Utuka (Bleoo '57), former Border Guards Commander and member of the Supreme Military Council I&II

== Politics, Royalty and Government ==
=== Head of State ===
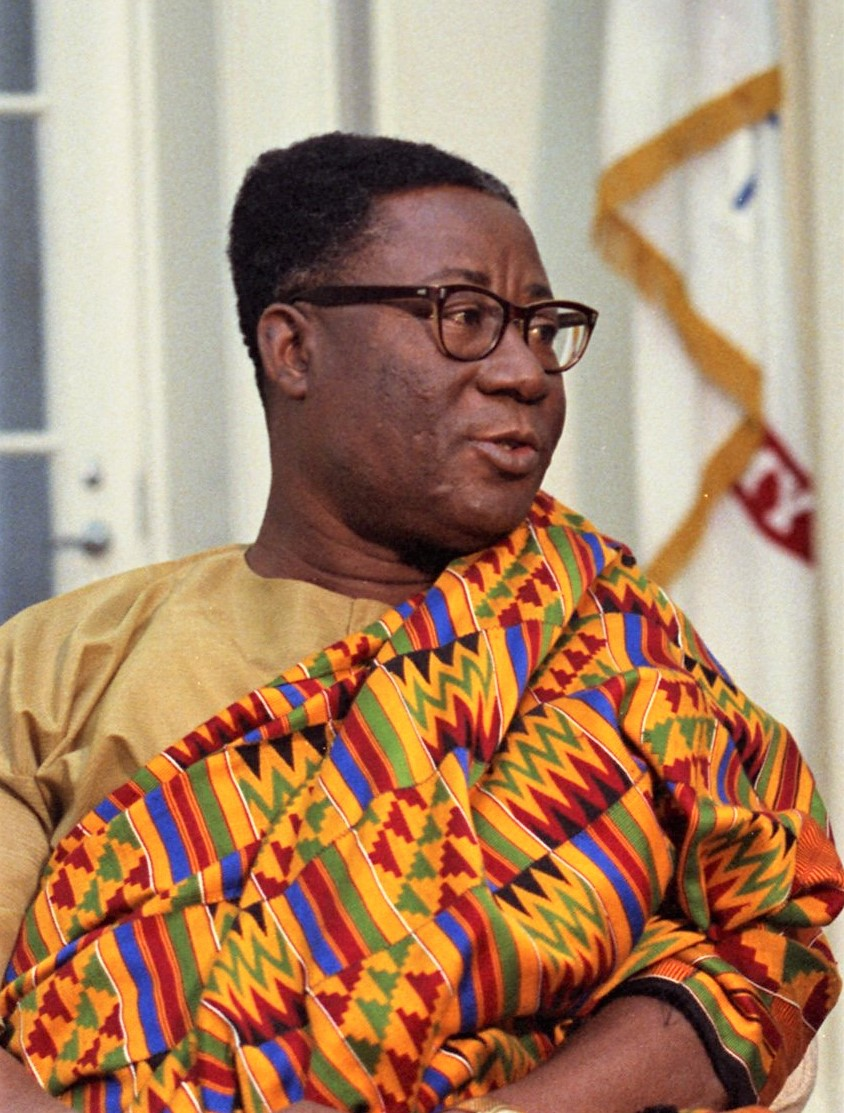
Joseph Arthur Ankrah, Second Head of State of Ghana

- Joseph Arthur Ankrah (Bleoo '37), Second Head of State of Ghana and 4th Chairperson of the Organisation of African Unity (now African Union)

=== Speakers of Parliament ===
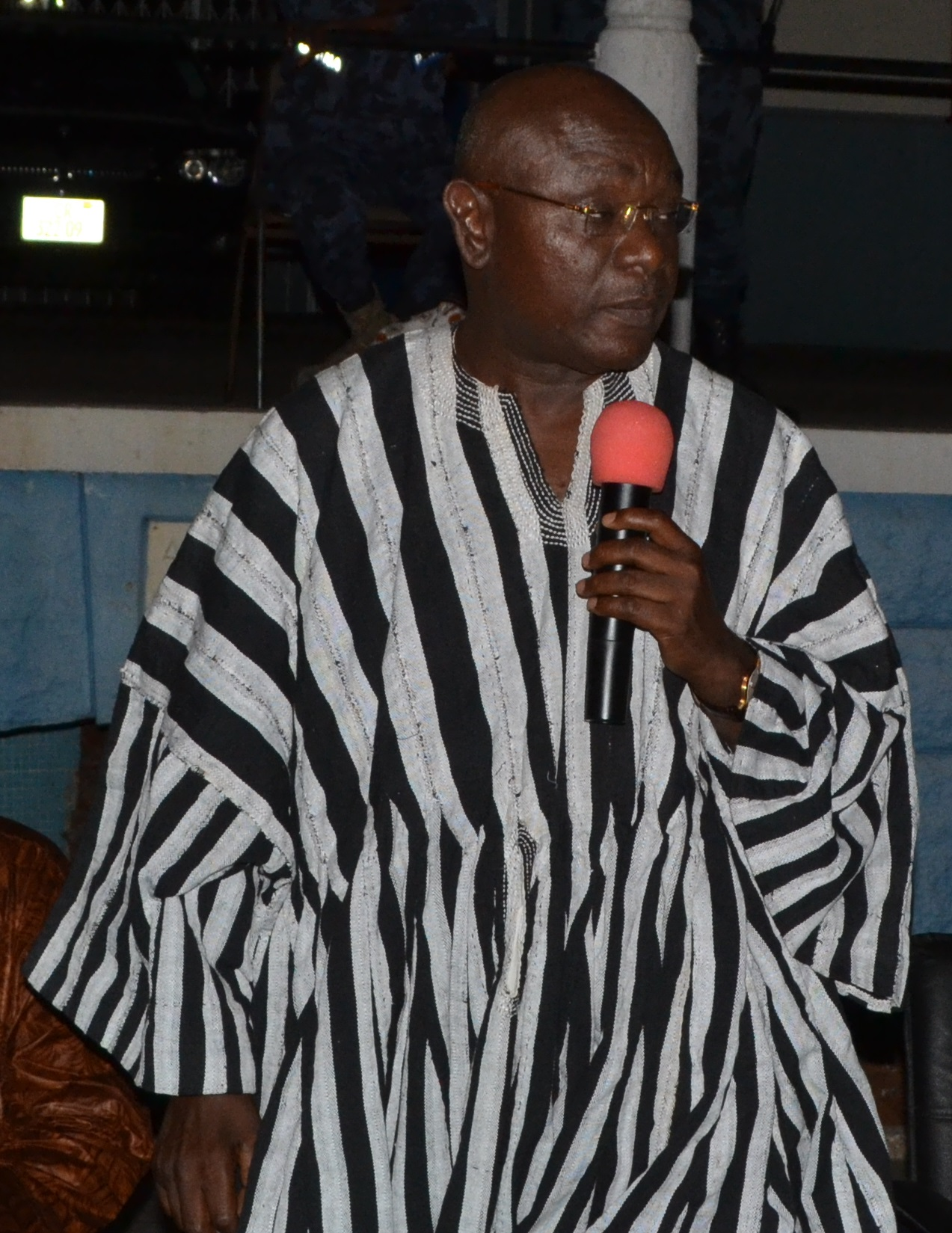
Edward Doe Adjaho, Chairman of the Council of State (2025 to present) & Speaker of the Parliament of Ghana (2013 to 2017)

- Edward Doe Adjaho (Bleoo '77), 11th Speaker of the Parliament of Ghana
- Peter Ala Adjetey (Bleoo '51), 8th Speaker of the Parliament of Ghana
- Daniel Francis Annan (Bleoo '45), 7th Speaker of the Parliament of Ghana and former appeal court judge

=== Ministers ===
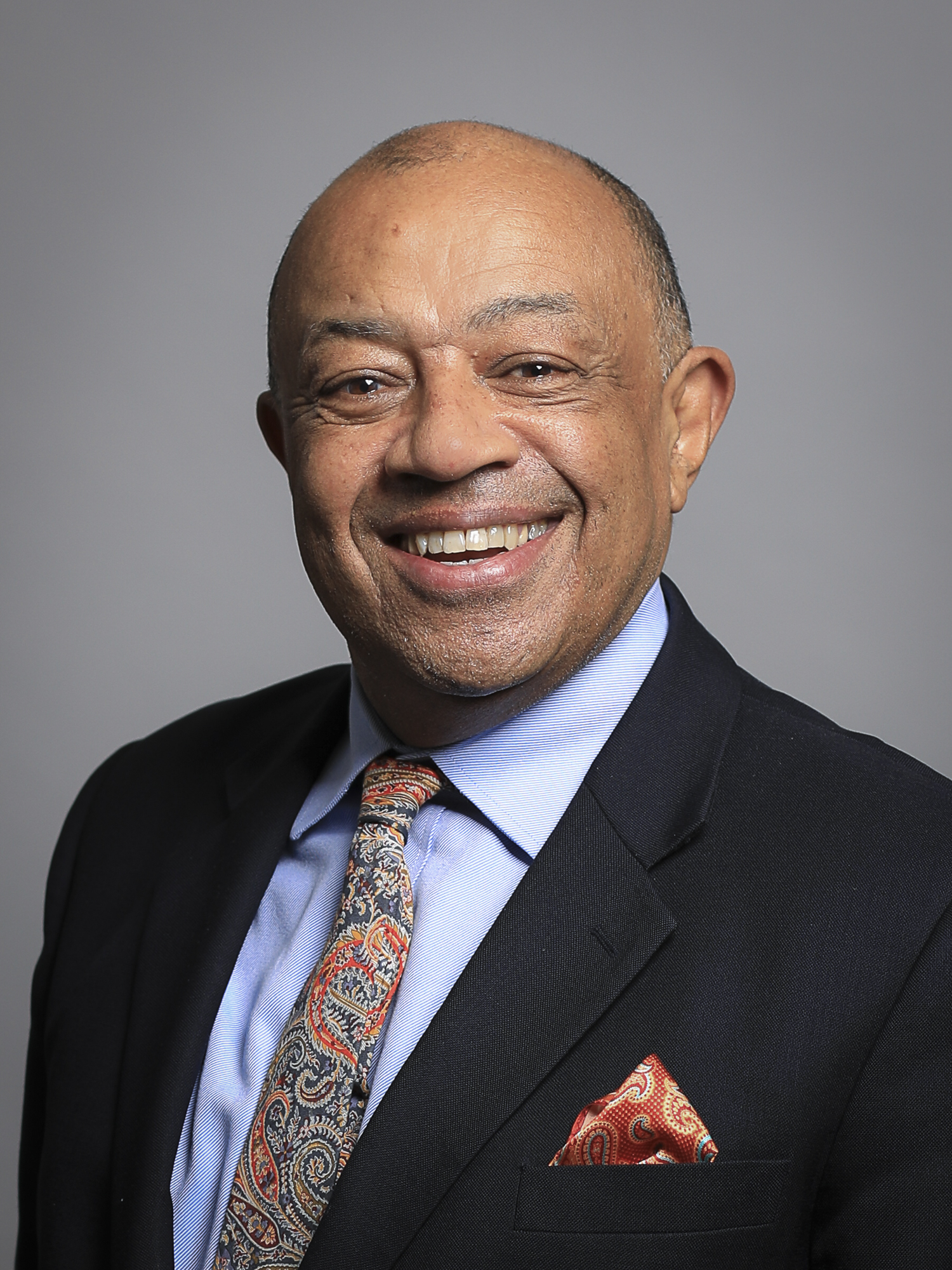
Paul Boateng– UK's first mixed-race Cabinet Minister

- William Codjoe Omaboe Acquaye-Nortey (Bleoo '48), Greater Accra Regional Commissioner (1972–1973), Upper Regional (now Upper East and Upper West regions) Commissioner (1973–1975), Western Regional Commissioner (September 1975–October 1975)
- Nicholas Yaw Boafo Adade (Bleoo '46), Minister for Interior (1971–1972)
- John Tetteh Doi Addy ( Bleoo '45), Western Regional Commissioner (1966–1967), Ashanti Regional Commissioner (1967–1968)
- Ako Adjei (Bleoo '36), member of the "Big Six", Minister for Interior; Minister of Trade and Minister of Foreign Affairs in Nkrumah's government
- Kwaku Ofori Asiamah (Bleoo '90), Minister for Transport (2017–2021) (2021–2025)
- Paul Boateng (Bleoo '68), the UK's first black Cabinet Minister, Chief Secretary to the Treasury (UK) (2002–2005), current member of the House of Lords (UK) (2010–)
- Ebenezer Ato Ayirebi-Acquah, Deputy Minister for Defence (1996–1997)
- William Godson Bruce-Konuah (Bleoo '51), Minister for Works and Housing (1969–1971) and Minister for labour and Cooperatives (1971–1972)
- Ohene Djan (Bleoo '43), Ministerial Secretary to the Ministry of Finance (1951–1954)
- Alfred Jonas Dowuona-Hammond, Minister for Education (1960–1964) and Minister for Communications (1964–1966)
- Samuel Kofi Dzamesi (Bleoo '78), Volta Regional Minister (2005–2009) and Minister for Chieftaincy and Religious Affairs (2017–2021)
- Harona Esseku (Bleoo '53), Minister of Transport and Communications (1969–1971) (youngest minister in the Busia government) and Chairman of the New Patriotic Party (2001–2005)
- Samuel Gyabaah (Bleoo '61), Upper Regional Commissioner (1978–1979)
- David Animle Hansen (Bleoo '42), Greater Accra Regional Commissioner (1966–1967)
- John Willie Kofi Harlley (Bleoo '39), Deputy Head of State of Ghana (1966–1969), Commissioner for Foreign Affairs (1967–1968) and Commissioner for Interior (March 1969–August 1969)
- Horace Walter Kofi-Sackey (Bleoo '50), Ministerial Secretary to the Ministry of Works (1969–1972)
- Chris Kpodo (Bleoo '65), Deputy Minister for Foreign Affairs and Regional Integration (2009-2012)
- Betty Mould-Iddrisu (Bleoo '73 ), Minister for Education (2011–2012)
- Emmanuel Noi Omaboe (Bleoo '50), Commissioner for Economic Affairs (1966–1969)
- Nathan Quao (Bleoo '34), Secretary at the Office of the PNDC (1984–1992)
- Gideon Quarcoo (Bleoo '69), Deputy Minister for Communications (2009-2012)
- Nana Akuoko Sarpong (Bleoo '57), Secretary for Health (1988–1991) and Secretary for Interior (1991–1992)
- Harry Sawyerr (Bleoo '46), Minister of Transport and Communications (1979–81) and Minister for Education (1993–1997)
- Paul Tagoe, Greater Accra Regional Commissioner (1964–1965) and First Parliamentary Secretary (1965–1966)
- William Adjei Thompson (Bleoo '58), Greater Accra Regional Commissioner (1975-1977) & Secretary (1985-1986) (1988-1991), Brong Ahafo Regional Commissioner (1977-1978), Central Regional Commissioner (1978-1979), Western Regional Secretary (1986-1988)
- Neville Alexander Odartey-Wellington (Bleoo '54), Commissioner for Health (1975–1978) and Commissioner for Agriculture (January 1979–June 1979)
- Aquinas Tawiah Quansah (Bleoo '85) deputy Central Regional Minister (2009-2013)

==== Other political figures ====
- Hugh Horatio Cofie-Crabbe (Bleoo '36), Executive Secretary of the Convention People's Party (1961–1962)
- Godfrey Gaoseb, Special Advisor on Economics in the Namibian governments of Sam Nujoma and Hifikepunye Pohamba (2001-2012)
- Mohammed Frimpong (Bleoo '77), Candidate for President in the 2024 Ghanaian general election, former General Secretary of the National Democratic Party
- Mahoma Mwakipunda Mwaungulu (Bleoo '58), Malawian freedom fighter and member of Hastings Banda's first cabinet as Economic Advisor.

=== Diplomats ===
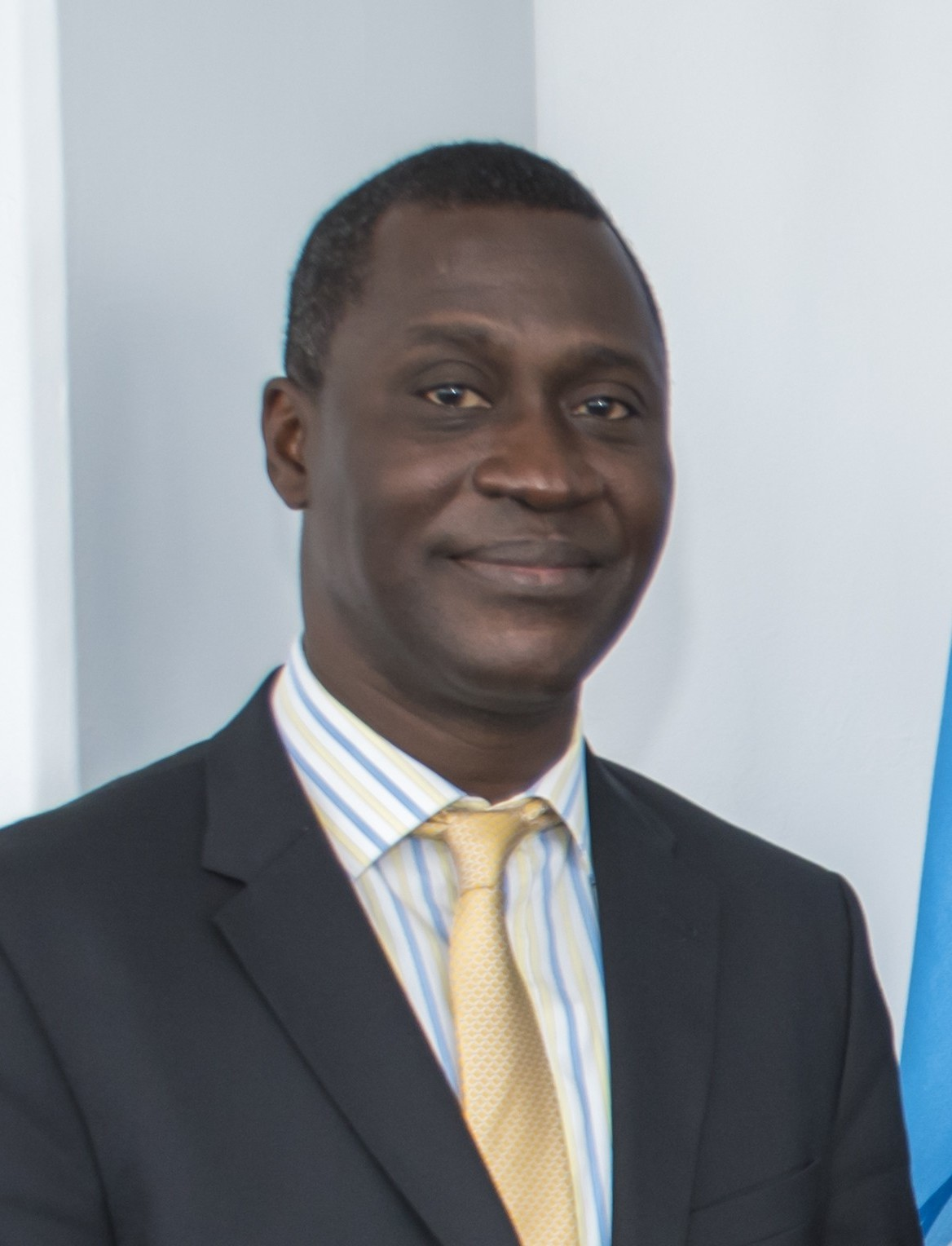
Ramses Cleland, Diplomat

- Edwin Nii Adjei (Bleoo '72), Ghana's High Commissioner to Australia (2017 - 2022), former Chief Director of the Ministry of Foreign Affairs
- Ebenezer Akuete (Bleoo ‘55), Chargé d'affaires of the Ghana Embassy in the United States (January 1982 - December 1982)
- Ebenezer Ate Allotey (Bleoo ‘53), Ghana’s Ambassador to Ivory Coast (1987 - 1989)
- Oscar Ameyedowo (Bleoo '67), Ghana's Ambassador to China (1997–2001)
- Patrick Amoah-Ntim, Ghana's ambassador to Serbia and Montenegro (2001–2005)
- Paul Boateng (Bleoo '68), British High Commissioner to South Africa (2005–2009)
- Frank Baffoe (Bleoo '52), Ghanaian academic, and honorary consul to Lesotho
- Morgan Brown (Bleoo '78), Ghana's Ambassador to Belgium, the Grand Duchy of Luxembourg and the European Union (2012–2016) and Ghana High Commissioner to Zambia (2016–2017)
- W. W. Bruce-Konuah, military attache to Ghana's High Commission in Pakistan, and Minister Consular at the Ghana Embassy in the United States
- Ramses Cleland (Bleoo ‘80), Ghana’s Ambassador to Switzerland & Permanent Representative of Ghana to the United Nations Office in Geneva (2017–2021); former Chief Director of the Ministry of Foreign Affairs
- Ben C. Eghan (Bleoo '66), Ghana's High Commissioner to Malaysia (2014–2017)
- Joe-Fio N. Meyer (Bleoo '40), Ghana Ambassador to Tanzania (1961–1963) and Ghana Ambassador to China (1964–1966)
- Clifford Amon Kotey (Bleoo '71), Ghana's Ambassador to Morocco (2009–2013)
- Chris Kpodo (Bleoo '65), Ghana's Acting High Commissioner to the United Kingdom (March 2001 - October 2001) and Ghana's ambassador to Congo (2002–2004), former Chief Director of the Ministry of Foreign Affairs
- Joseph Boye Lomotey (Bleoo '39), Ghana's Ambassador to Yugoslavia (1969–1970), Deputy High Commissioner to the United Kingdom (1966-1969), Deputy High Commissioner to India (1962-1966)
- Samuel Odoi-Sykes (Bleoo '48), Ghana's High Commissioner to Canada (2001–2006), Chairman of the New Patriotic Party (1998–2001), Deputy High Commissioner to the United Kingdom (1970 -1972)
- George Adjei Osekre (Bleoo '53), Ghana Ambassador to Egypt (1979–1981)
- Richard Oblitei Solomon (Bleoo '76), Ghana's ambassador to Equatorial Guinea (2006-2009)
- Theodosius Okan Sowa (Bleoo '41), Ghana's first Consul-General to the United Nations; Ghana Ambassador to Mali (1977–1983)
- Nathan Quao (Bleoo ‘35), former Counsellor to Ghana's Permanent Mission to the United Nations, former Principal Secretary to the Ministry of Foreign Affairs
- Kwame Asamoah Tenkorang (Bleoo '70), Ghana ambassador to Libya (2008–2009), Ghana ambassador to Japan (2009–2011) and Ghana High Commissioner to Kenya (2016–2017)
- Aquinas Tawiah Quansah (Bleoo '85) Deputy High commissioner to the United Kingdom (2025-present)

=== Members of Parliament ===
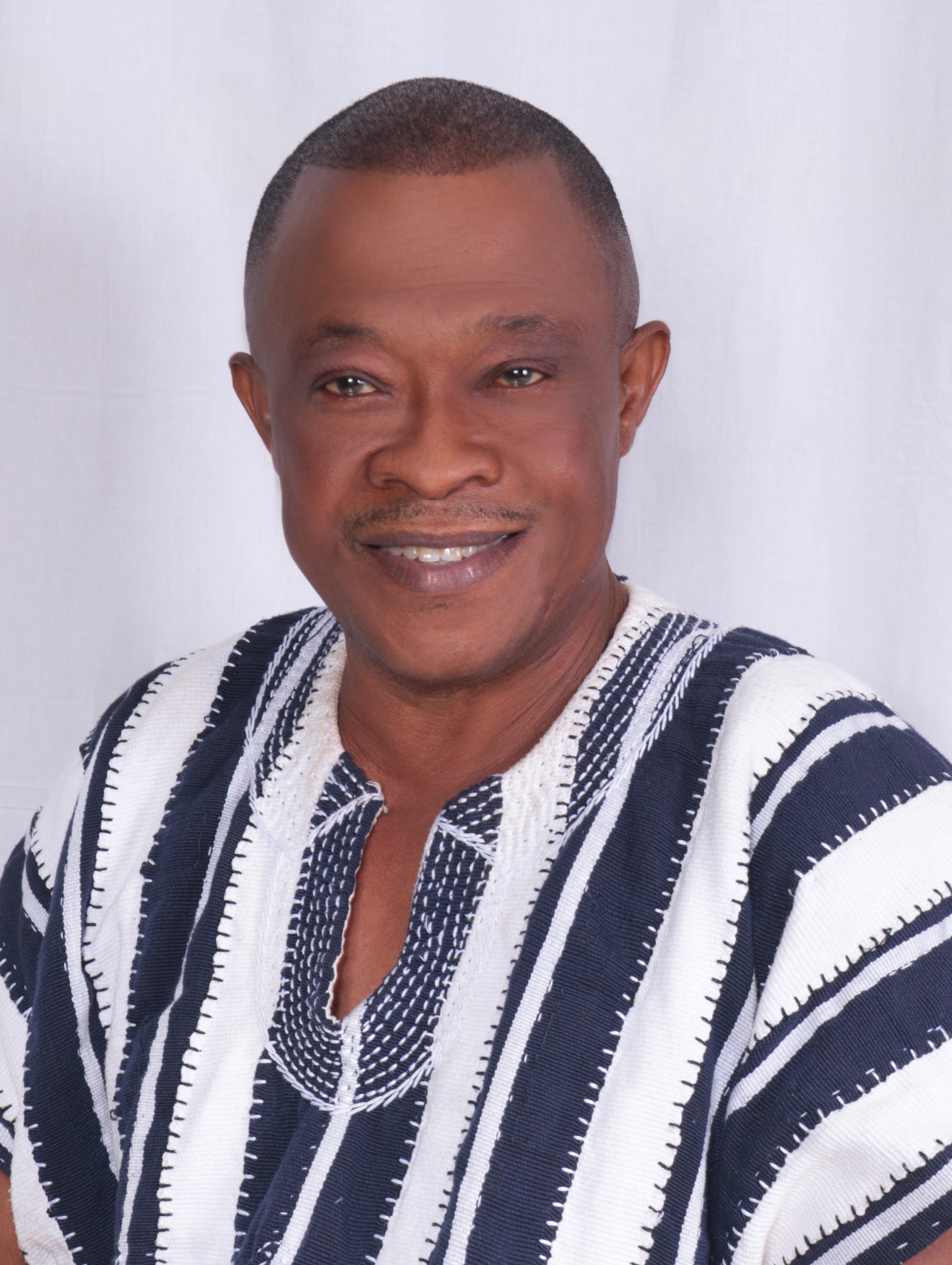
Wisdom Gidisu, Politician

- Kwadwo Agyei-Addo, MP for Fanteakwa (2005-2009)
- Richie Agyemfra-Kumi, MP for Akropong (1992–1996)
- Oscar Ameyedowo (Bleoo '67), MP for South Tongu (1992–1996)
- Eddie Ampah (Bleoo '45), MP for Asebu (1965–1966)
- Ahmed Arthur (Bleoo '89), MP for Okaikwei South (2013–2021)
- Reginald Nii Bi Ayibonte (Bleoo '82), MP for Odododiodio(2001–2005)
- Ebenezer Ato Ayirebi-Acquah, MP for Effutu (1992–1996)
- Kodzo Ayeke (Bleoo ‘46), MP for Ho West (1954–1960)
- Bernard Baidoo (Bleoo ‘03), MP for Akwatia (2025 to present)
- Ohene Djan (Bleoo '43), MLA for Akuapem/New Juaben (1951–1954)
- Wisdom Gidisu (Bleoo '86), MP for Krachi East (2005–2017) and (2021–)
- Eric Kwame Heymann (Bleoo '47), MP for Buem (1965–1966)
- Emmanuel Welbeck Nortey, MP for Korle Klottey (1992–1996)
- Samuel Odoi-Sykes (Bleoo ‘48), MP for Ashiedu Keteke (1979–1981); Minority Leader of Parliament (1980–1981)
- Paul Edward Okwabi (Bleoo '40), MP for Guan (1965–1966)
- George Adjei Osekre (Bleoo '53), MP for Kpeshie (1969–1972)
- Aquinas Tawiah Quansah (Bleoo '85) MP for Mfantseman West ( 2009–2013), Mfantseman (2013-2017)

=== Monarchs ===
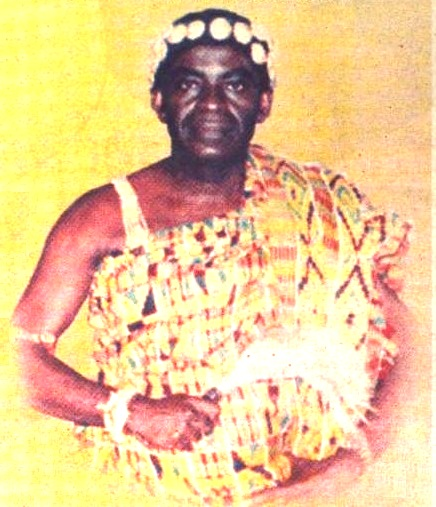
Nana Awuah Darko Ampem I, Nkosuohene (progress chief) of Asante Juaben

- Nana Akuoko Sarpong (Bleoo '57), Omanhene of Agogo Traditional Area (1976–2026)
- Nana Awuah Darko Ampem I (Bleoo '51), Nkosuohene (progress chief) of Asante Juaben (1985–2005)
- Nana Wereko Ampem II (Bleoo '50), Gyaasehene of Akuapem and Ohene of Amanokrom (1975–2005), chancellor of the University of Ghana (1999–2005)
- Osagyefo Kuntunkununku II (Bleoo '62), 34th Okyenhene (1976–1999); President of the National House of Chiefs (1998–1999)
- Nana Kwabena Wiafe, Omanhene of Offinso Traditional Area (1935 -1945) (1959 -1966)
- Neenyi Ghartey VII (Bleoo '75), Omanhene of Winneba, Effutu traditional area (1996–) , Chancellor of university of education, Winneba (2023-)
- Nana Ansah Kwao IV, Ohene of Adumasa (2011–)
- Nana Nkuah Okomdom II, Omanhene of Sefwi Wiawso Traditional Area (1997–2011)
- Nana Ofosu Peko III (Bleoo '77, '79), Safohene of Breman Traditional Area (2017- )

== Public Servants ==
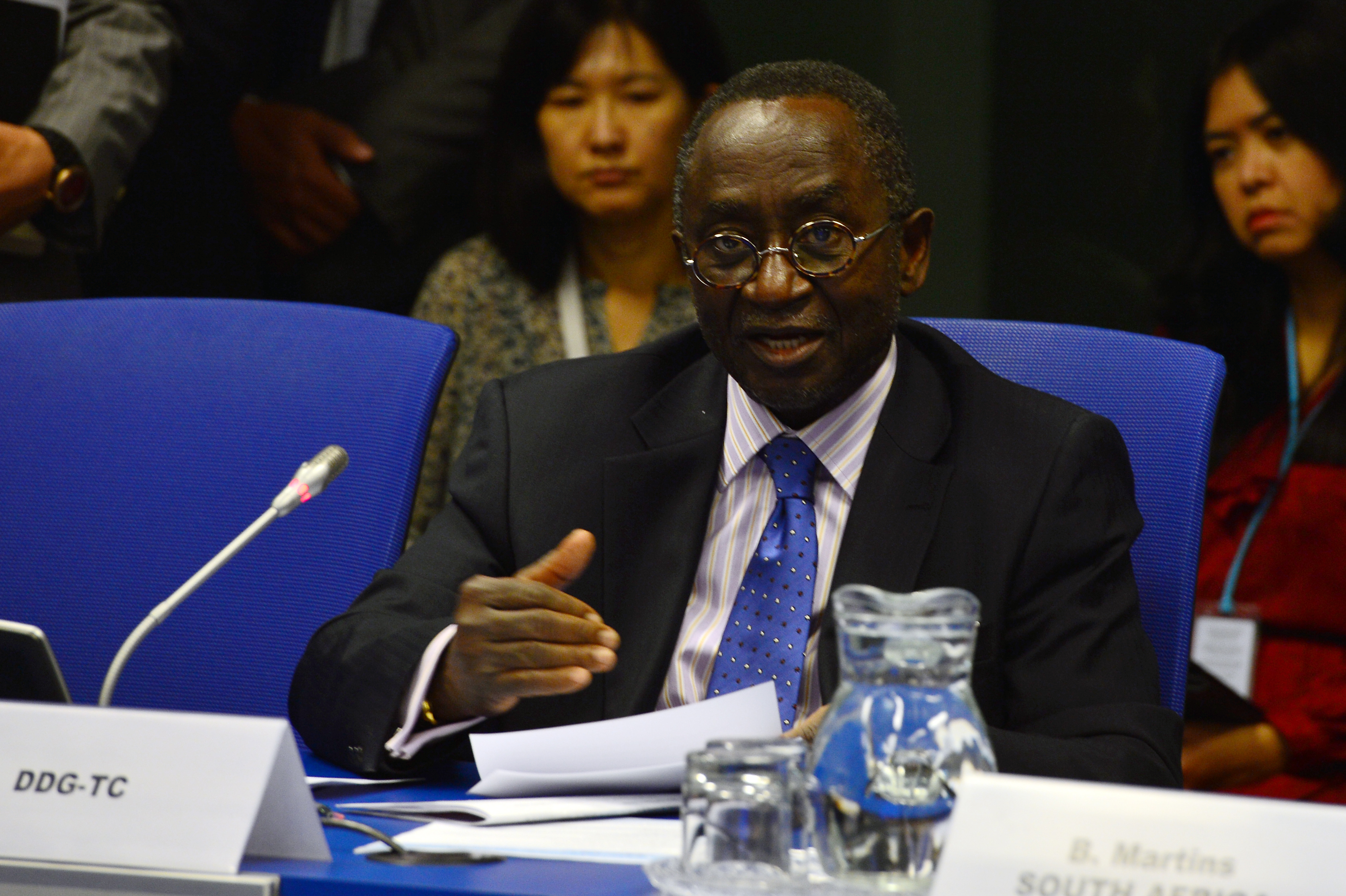
Kwaku Aning, former Deputy Director-General of the International Atomic Energy Agency

- Jacob Blukoo-Allotey, (Bleoo '48), former chairman and managing director of the State Pharmaceutical Corporation
- Kwaku Aning (Bleoo '60), Deputy Director-General of the International Atomic Energy Agency (2010–2015)
- Gilbert Boafo Boahene (Bleoo '46), Cabinet Secretary
- Alex Dodoo (Bleoo '83), Director-General of Ghana Standards Authority (2017–2025)
- Harry Dodoo (Bleoo '38), former chairman and managing director of Ghana Cocoa Board (first Ghanaian chartered accountant)
- Robert Dodoo (Bleoo '54), Head of the Civil Service (1993–2001)
- Ben C. Eghan (Bleoo '66), Cabinet Secretary (2009-2013)
- Godfrey Gaoseb, first Permanent Secretary at the Ministry of Finance of Namibia
- John Willie Kofi Harlley (Bleoo '39), 2nd Ghanaian Commissioner of Police (1965 – 1966) and 1st Inspector General of Police (IGP) of the Ghana Police Service (1966 – 1969)
- Archie Hesse (Bleoo '81), CEO of Ghana Interbank Payment and Settlement Systems (2012 - 2025)
- Lebrecht Wilhelm Fifi Hesse (Bleoo '54), former Principal Secretary at the Office of the PNDC Coordinating Secretary and Director-General of the Ghana Broadcasting Corporation (1972–1975) and (1984–1990) (first Black African Rhodes Scholar)
- Alex Mould (Bleoo '78), CEO of the National Petroleum Authority (NPA) (2009–2013) and CEO of the Ghana National Petroleum Corporation (GNPC) (2013–2017)
- Henry Plange Nyemitei (Bleoo '38), pioneering executive and former general manager of State Insurance Company
- Joseph Bennet Odunton (Bleoo '39), former Director of Information Services; Assistant Press Secretary to Queen Elizabeth II (1959–1960) (first black African to hold an appointment at the Buckingham Palace)
- Emmanuel Noi Omaboe (Bleoo '50), Government Statistician (1960-1966)
- Adjebu Osah-Mills (Bleoo '38), Establishment Secretary (1961–1967)
- Nathan Quao (Bleoo '35), Cabinet Secretary and former Head of the Civil Service
- I. B. Quartey (Bleoo '71), Chief Executive of the Metro Mass Transit Company Limited (2015-2017)
- Edward Quist-Arcton (Bleoo '42), first Ghanaian Chief Conservator of Forests
- Amadu Sulley (Bleoo '75), Deputy Commissioner of the Electoral Commission of Ghana (2012–2018)
- Randy Abbey (Bleoo '92), Chief Executive Officer (CEO) of Ghana Cocoa Board.

== Religion ==
- Isaac Ababio (Bleoo '60), first Ghanaian radio evangelist
- Kofi Adonteng Boateng (Bleoo ‘91), founder of Divine Word International Ministries
- Francis William Banahene Thompson (Bleoo '49), Anglican Bishop Emeritus of the Anglican Diocese of Accra (1983–1996)
- Hilliard Dogbe (Bleoo '85), President of the Board of Bishops of the African Methodist Episcopal Zion Church (2024 - 2025)

== Sports ==
=== Athletes ===
- John Myles-Mills (Bleoo '86), former national athlete; African 200m silver medallist
- Leo Myles-Mills (Bleoo '92), former national athlete, Ghana 100m record holder of 9.99s; African 4X100m gold medallist

=== Footballers ===
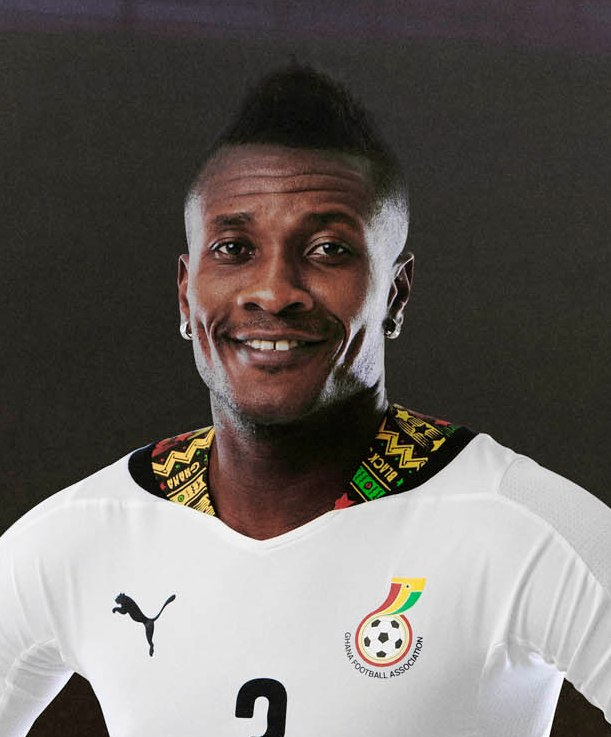
Asamoah Gyan, top goal scorer of the Ghana national football team

- Lee Addy, Ghana national football team (Blackstars) (2009–2012)
- Godfried Aduobe (Bleoo '92), Ghana national football team (Blackstars) (2003) and former KSC professional player
- Owusu Afriyie (Bayie) (Bleoo '95), footballer
- Prince Koranteng Amoako (Bleoo '91), Ghana national football team (Blackstars) (1995–2002)
- Denny Antwi, footballer
- Asamoah Gyan (Bleoo '02), Ghana national football team (Blackstars) (2003–date), most capped player for the Ghana National team and Ghana's top goal scorer
- Princeton Owusu-Ansah (Bleoo '92), Ghana national football team (Blackstars) (1997–2002)

=== Sports Administrators ===
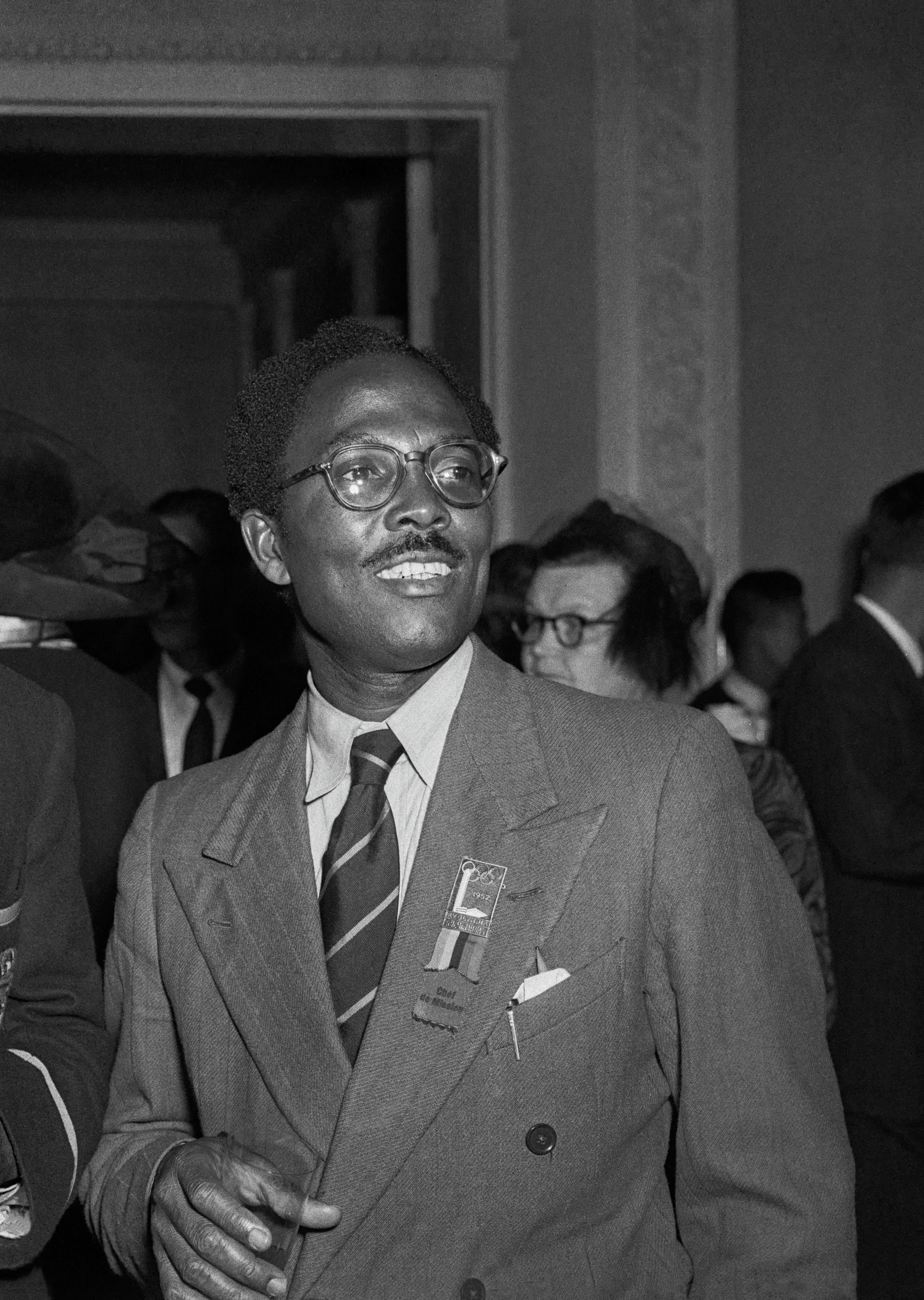
A.K. Konuah, Secretary and founding member of the Ghana Amateur Athletics Association

- Randy Abbey (Bleoo '92), owner and president of Heart of Lions Football Club; Executive Council Committee Member of the Ghana Football Association
- Anim Addo (Bleoo '94), football agent; Executive Council Committee Member of the Ghana Football Association
- Prosper Harrison Addo (Bleoo '94), General Secretary of the Ghana Football Association
- N.A. Adjin-Tettey (Bleoo '51), former national athletics coach; former chair of the Ghana Amateur Athletics Association
- Ohene Djan (Bleoo '43), Director of Sports at the Central Organization of Sports(COS) during the first republic; founder of the Ghana national football team (Black stars), the Ghana Premier League and the Ghanaian FA Cup; first president of the Ghana Football Association. Former vice president of CAF. Ghana's national stadium was named in his honour.
- A.K. Konuah (Bleoo '33), Secretary and founding member of the Ghana Amateur Athletics Association
- Henry Plange Nyemitei (Bleoo '38), former president and first executive chairman of Accra Hearts of Oak football club; former chairman of the Ghana Football Association and former president of the West Africa Sports Federation

=== Others ===
- Alhassan Brimah (Bleoo '56), Professional Boxer, 1962 Africa Middleweight Champion
- Daniel Nii Laryea (Bleoo '06), FIFA and CAF referee

== Notable faculty ==
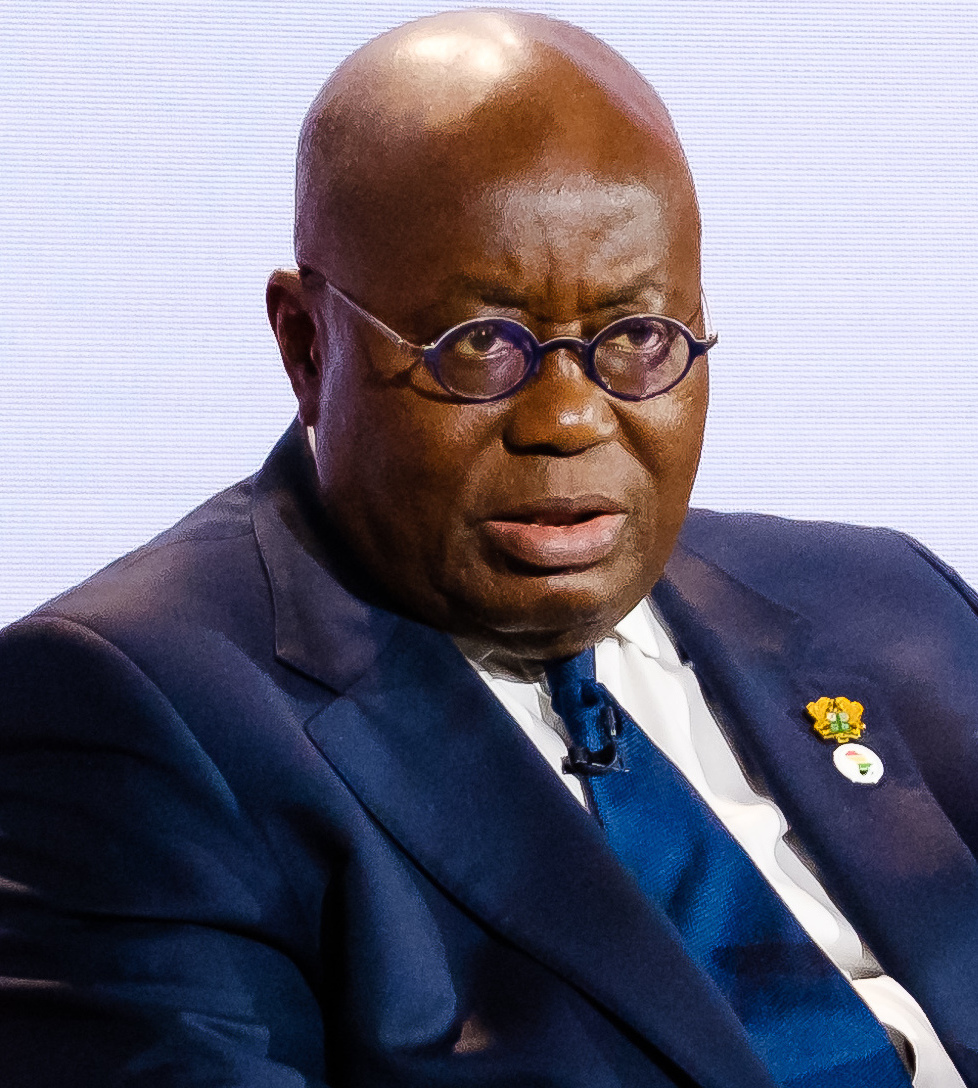
Nana Akufo-Addo, Incumbent President of the republic of Ghana

- Nana Akufo-Addo, President of Ghana (2017-2025)
- Ken Ofori-Atta, co-founder of Databank Group and current Minister for Finance
- Prince Kofi Amoabeng, co-founder of defunct UT Bank
- Komla Agbeli Gbedemah, Minister for Finance (1954–1961), Minister for Health (1961–1963), and founder and leader of the National Alliance of Liberals
- E. R. T. Madjitey, First Ghanaian Commissioner of the Ghana Police, minority leader of the second republic and leader of the Justice Party
- M.F. Dei-Anang, Head of African Affairs Secretariat in the office of the President in the first republic
- Kwadwo Agyei Agyapong, one of the three High Court judges that were abducted and murdered on 30 June 1982.
- Peter Nortsu-Kotoe, MP for Akatsi-North, Ranking member on Parliament’s Education Committee
