= Eghan =

Eghan is a surname occurring in Ghana. Notable people with the surname include:

- Benjamin Clement Eghan, Ghanaian civil servant
- Mike Eghan (1936–2025), Ghanaian broadcaster, and author
- Shadrach Eghan (born 1994), Ghanaian footballer
