= Kofi Adonteng Boateng =

Ghanaian clergy member

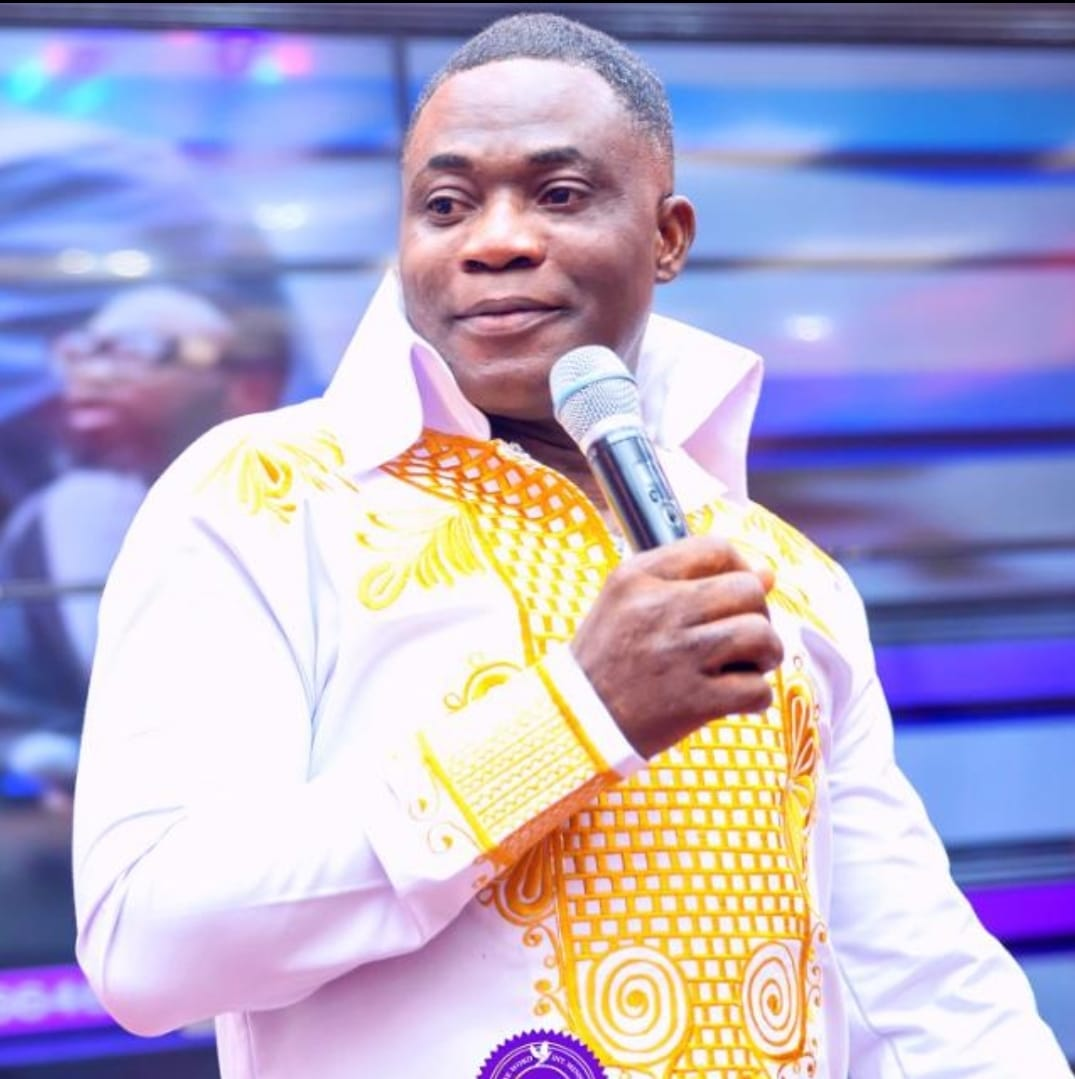
- Portrait of Bishop Kofi Adonteng Boateng
- Religion: Christianity
- Church: Divine Word International Ministries
- Title: Founder, Divine Word International Ministries

Kofi Adonteng Boateng is a Ghanaian American-based theologian, preacher, Bishop, and philanthropist. He is the founder of the Divine Word International Ministries.

== Early life and education ==
Kofi was born in July 21, studied Biblical Counseling and Theology at Collins University of Ohio, United States of America, and later received an Honorary Ph.D. of Divinity in 2011 at same University.

== Career ==
In 2009, Kofi Adonteng Boateng founded the Divine Word International Ministries (DWIM) from Worcester Massachusetts, United States of America (USA) which he started as a prayer network known as Divine Prayer Line. He was later ordained as Bishop of the church.

=== Philanthropy ===
Kofi has been involved in philanthropic works both in Ghana and in the United States of America. He donated to the bereaved parents of students of the Wenchi Methodist Senior High School who died in the Kintampo Waterfalls disaster on March 19, 2017.

Adonteng Boateng also instituted the Faithful Servants Awards to honour civilians, first responders and police officers of the State Police of Franconia Police Department and Fairfax County Police Department for their dedicated service to communities in Northern Virginia.
