= Felix Nyarko-Pong =

Ghanaian banker

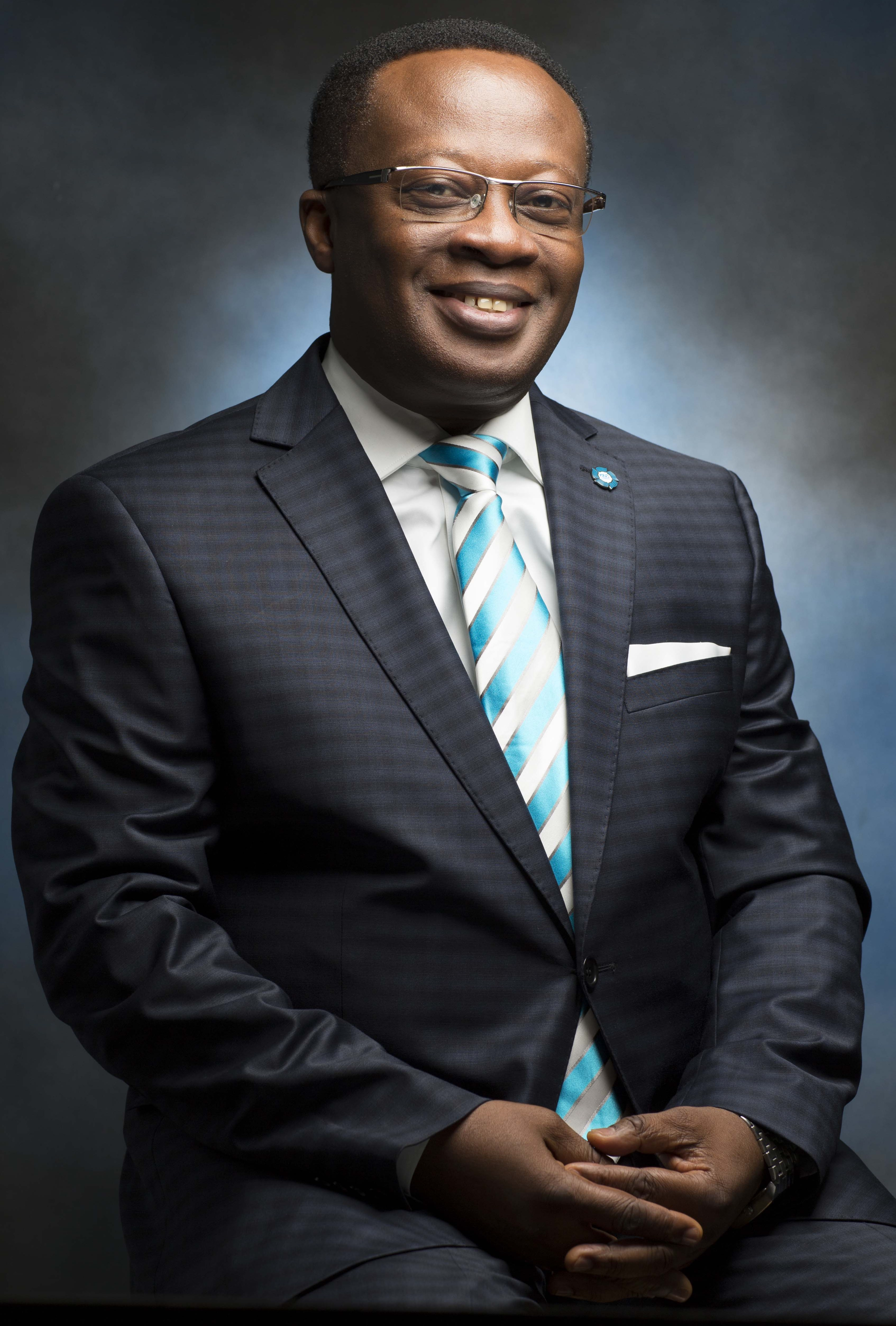
- Felix Nyarko-Pong
- Education: University of Ghana; University of Glasgow
- Occupation: banker

Felix Nyarko-Pong is a Ghanaian banker who was CEO of uniBank from June 2011 to May 2017.

== Education ==
Nyarko-Pong was educated at Presbyterian Secondary School, Abetifi and Accra Academy for his secondary education. He continued to the University of Ghana, Legon where he graduated with a bachelor's degree in Banking & Finance. He went on to the University of Glasgow Scotland and graduated with an MBA in International Business. He studied at the Said Business School, Oxford and obtained a Certificate in Strategic Leadership.

== Career ==
In 1996, Nyarko-Pong became an assistant principal consultant of the National Banking College, Accra and also joined Barclays Bank Ghana. He first served as executive director of retail banking and then executive head of treasury. In 2007, he left for Tanzania and was appointed chief operating officer at NMB Bank in Dar Es Salaam (on secondment from Rabobank International Nlg).

In 2011, he was named chief executive officer of uniBank. He was replaced as CEO of unibank by Kwabena Duffuor II in 2017.

Nyarko-Pong has been involved with corporate units of the Presbyterian Church of Ghana. In 2008 he became chairman of Andreas Riis Company, the printing press arm of the church and held the role until 2016. Nyarko-Pong was a member of the 4th and 5th university councils of the Presbyterian University College within the period began in 2011.

In 2015, Nyarko-Pong was made chairman of the advisory council of University of Ghana's College of Education and was a member of the management committee of the School of Biomedical and Allied Health Sciences at the same university.

== Membership and honours ==
Nyarko-Pong is an honorary Fellow of the Chartered Institute of Bankers Ghana (FCIB) and also holds an honorary doctorate in banking and finance. He has been awarded by The Global Leadership Training USA(Exceptional Corporate Leadership, 2012); Global Centre for Transformational Leadership (Africa Prize for Transformational Leadership and Most Outstanding CEO 2013) and also has the West African Nobles Award. Felix Nyarko-Pong was on Saturday, April 30, 2017 presented with the Banking and Financial CEO of the Year 2016 award at the 7th Ghana Entrepreneurs and Corporate Awards held at the Banquet Hall, State House, Accra.
