= Ebenezer Ato Ayirebi-Acquah =

Ghanaian politician

R. Ebenezer Ato Ayirebi-Acquah

MP for Effutu Constituency
- In office 7 January 1993 – 6 January 1997
- President: Jerry John Rawlings

Personal details
- Born: Central region, Ghana
- Party: National Democratic Congress
- Occupation: Politician

R. Ebenezer Ato Ayirebi-Acquah is a Ghanaian politician and a member of the first Parliament of the fourth Republic representing the Effutu constituency in the Central Region of Ghana.

== Early life and education ==
R. Ebenezer Ato Ayirebi-Acquah was born at Effutu in the Central Region of Ghana. He studied General Surgery and Medicine.

== Politics ==
R. Ebenezer Ato Ayirebi-Acquah was first elected into Parliament on the ticket of the National Democratic Congress during the 1992 Ghanaian parliamentary election for the Effutu constituency in the Central Region of Ghana. He was defeated Mike Allen Hammah who polled 11,398 votes out of the 100% valid votes cast representing 42.80% over Joseph Nunoo-Mensah who polled 9,144 votes representing 34.30%.

== Career ==
R. Ebenezer Ato Ayirebi-Acquah is a medical doctor by profession and a former member of parliament for the Effutu constituency in the Central Region of Ghana.

== Personal life ==
He is a Christian.
