= Richard Orraca-Tetteh =

Ghanaian academic

- Born: Richard Orraca-Tetteh; 5 March 1932
- Died: 23 February 2002 (aged 69)
- Occupation: Academic

Academic background
- Education: University of Ghana; University of London

Academic work
- Institutions: University of Ghana; University of California; University of Maryland
- Main interests: Nutrition; Food Science

Richard Orraca-Tetteh (5 March 1932 - 23 February 2002) was a Ghanaian professor of food science and nutrition at the University of Ghana, Legon. He was a pioneer for the study of nutrition and food science as an academic discipline in Africa.

== Early life ==
Orraca-Tetteh was born on 5 March 1932 in Accra. He was educated at Accra Academy from 1948 to 1951 and took a bachelor's degree at the University of Ghana, Legon in 1959. In 1960, he enrolled at the University of London and earned a Ph.D. in nutrition.

== Career ==
Orraca-Tetteh worked briefly as a nutrition officer at the Ministry of Health in Accra. After his postgraduate training, he transferred to the University of Ghana, Legon where he spent his professional life in teaching and research. He was a senior lecturer of the university from 1967 to 1971, and an associate professor from 1971.

He held visiting professorship roles at the University of California, Berkeley in 1973, and at the University of Maryland, College Park from 1990 to 1992. He was a consultant to the Food and Agriculture Organization and also to the United Nations University (UNU) and was the first coordinator for UNU-affiliated institutions in Africa.

He was a member of the British Nutrition Society, the Ghana Institute of Nutrition and Food Technology and a member of the International Union of Nutritional Sciences, of which he represented the African Region for 12 consecutive years on the Executive Council, a position he relinquished only in August 2001.
