= Richmond Aryeetey =

Ghanaian academic

Richmond Aryeetey FGA
- Born: Richmond Nii Okai Aryeetey
- Education: University of Ghana; Iowa State University
- Scientific career
- Fields: Public health
- Workplaces: University of Ghana

Richmond Aryeetey is a Ghanaian academic. He is a professor of Public Health Nutrition at the University of Ghana and Head of the Department of Population, Family, and Reproductive Health.

Aryeetey is a fellow of the African Nutrition Leadership Programme, the Yale University Global Health Leadership Institute, and the Brown University International Advanced Research Institute. He is a visiting professor at the University of Sheffield’s Centre for Health and Related Research and was elected as a fellow of the Ghana Academy of Arts and Sciences in 2022.

== Education ==
Richmond Aryeetey completed his secondary education at the Accra Academy and graduated from the University of Ghana with a bachelor's degree in Nutrition and Food Science in 1999. He then earned a Master of Public Health degree from the University of Ghana in 2003, followed by a Ph.D. in Human Nutritional Sciences from Iowa State University of Science and Technology, Ames, Iowa, US, in 2007.

== Career ==
Following his undergraduate study at the University of Ghana, Aryeetey worked as a Research Assistant with the WHO Multicentre Growth Reference Study at the University of Ghana between 1999 and 2001. After pursuing his master's degree at the University of Ghana, he worked as a Research Officer with the Dangbe West District Health Directorate. While studying at Iowa State University, he was appointed as a Research Assistant in the Department of Food Science and Nutrition from 2003 to 2007.

Upon his return to Ghana, Aryeetey joined the School of Public Health as a Lecturer, and from 2010 to 2013, he served as the Head of the Department of Biostatistics. In 2012, he was appointed senior lecturer and served in this capacity until 2017 when he was made associate professor. In 2020 he was appointed Professor of the Population, Family, and Reproductive Health Department of the school of Public Health.

Aryeetey is a Fellow of the Ghana Academy of Arts and Sciences and co-chair of the Task Team for Ghana's first Food-Based Dietary Guidelines. Additionally, he is an executive committee member of the Scaling Up Nutrition (SUN) movement, and serves as co-chair of the WHO Guidelines Development Committee for the upcoming Global Guidelines on Complementary Feeding.

In addition to his teaching roles, Aryeetey has held other positions. In 2014, he was the Project Manager for a University of Ghana Research Project titled "Building Capacity for Sustainable Livelihoods and Health through Public-Private Linkages in Agriculture and Health Systems."

== Research interests ==
Aryeetey's research focuses on ecological and household-level support for enhancing infant and young child feeding practices. He is involved in community-based interventions aimed at improving food and nutrition security. His work also explores the ecological determinants of overweight and nutrition-related non-communicable diseases (NCDs). Additionally, he conducts assessments of physical activity and nutritional status across different stages of the life cycle. His scholarly contributions include over 130 peer-reviewed journal articles and book chapters.
