= Dela Ahiawor =

Ghanaian journalist

- Education: Accra Academy

Dela Ahiawor is a Ghanaian sports journalist and editor-at-large at Sports24ghana.com. He is an official at OSJU.
