= Archie Hesse =

Ghanaian banking executive

- Education: Physics and Computing; PGCE; MBA (Finance)
- Alma mater: University of Ghana (assumed for MBA)
- Occupation: Chief Executive Officer
- Years active: 2007–2025
- Employer: Ghana Interbank Payment and Settlement Systems
- Known for: Leading GhIPSS
- Title: Past CEO of GhIPSS
- Awards: Man of the Year – Technology (EMY Africa 2018); Lifetime Achievement Award (Ghana Fintech Awards 2023); Best Leadership in Payment Regulation – Arab Afro Summit (2024)

Archie Hesse is a Ghanaian technology and payment systems executive, who served as the Chief executive officer of Ghana Interbank Payment and Settlement Systems Limited (GhIPSS, a subsidiary of the Bank of Ghana, from 2012 to July,2025.

== Early life and education ==
Hesse holds a Bachelor's degree in Physics and Computing, a Postgraduate certificate in Education (PGCE), and a Master's degree in Business administration (Finance). He also earned professional certifications in Project management and IT Infrastructure Library (ITIL).

== Career ==
Hesse joined the BMW Group, where he spent over a decade working across Germany, the United Kingdom, South Africa, and the United States.

In 2007, he joined the newly formed GhIPSS as the General manager responsible for Projects and business development. In 2012, Hesse was appointed CEO of GhIPSS.

== Awards and recognition ==
Archie Hesse was named Man of the Year – Technology at the EMY Africa Awards in 2019. He was awarded Payment Systems Personality of the Year by the Ghana Information Technology & Telecom Awards (GITTA) in 2018, 2019, and 2020. In 2023, he received the Most Inspirational Payments Leader in West Africa award at the Africa Bank 4.0 Summit in Lagos and a Lifetime Achievement Award at the Ghana Fintech Awards.
