= Kwaku Aning =

Ghanaian technologist and administrator

Dr. Kwaku Aning
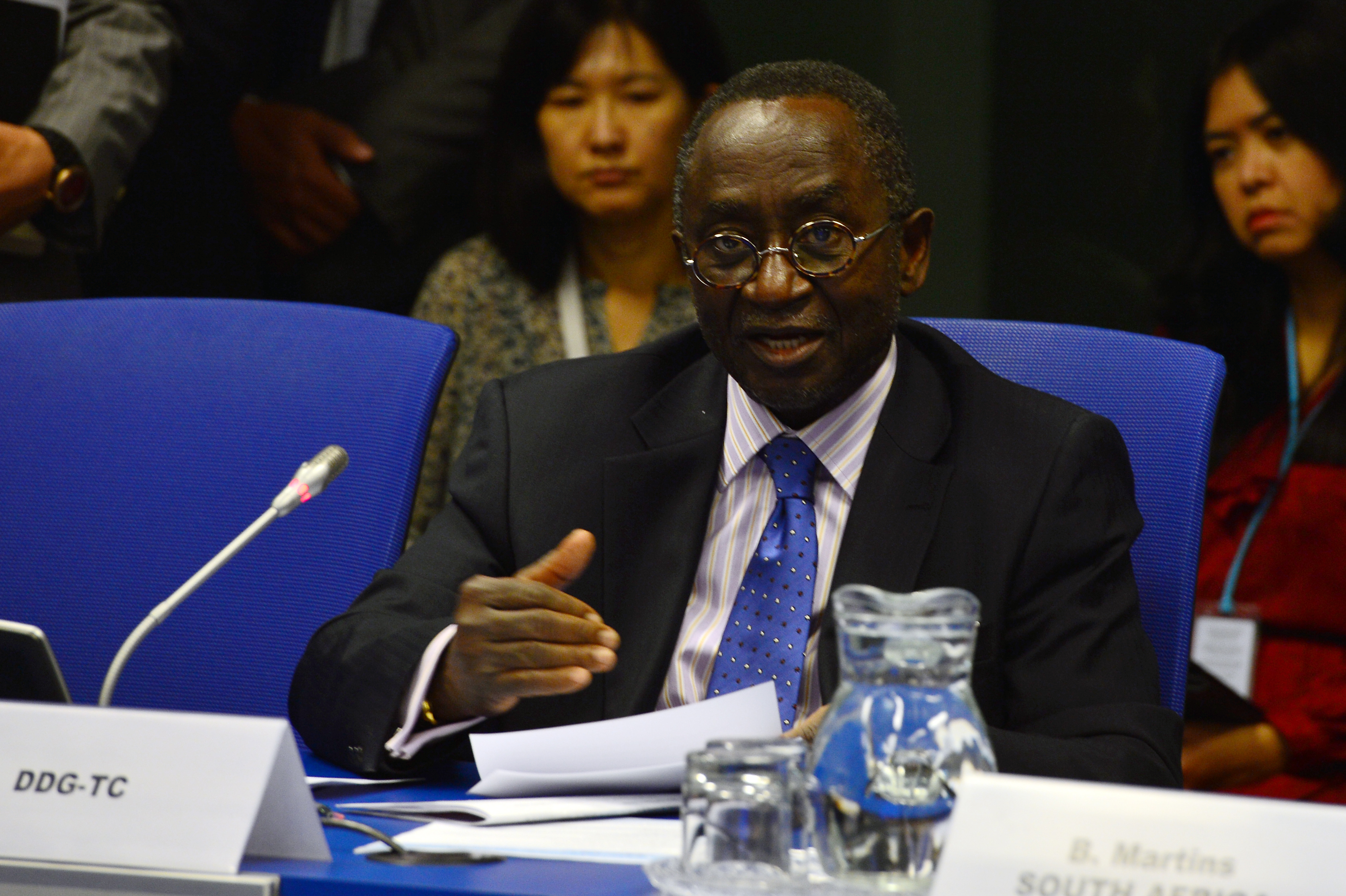
- Aning delivering opening remarks at an event in Austria in 2013

Former Chairman of the Ghana Atomic Energy Commission
- In office 2017–2024

Personal details
- Born: 1946 (age 79–80)
- Spouse: Arafua Apaloo-Aning
- Education: Accra Academy; Mfantsipim Secondary School; University of Science and Technology; Princeton University; Columbia University

Kwaku Aning (born in 1946) is a Ghanaian diplomat,scientist, engineer, international civil servant and technologist who was Chairman of the governing board of the Ghana Atomic Energy Commission, having been appointed in July 2017. Aning is a former Deputy Director-General of the International Atomic Energy Agency. and prior to that the Secretary of the Policy Making Organs of the IAEA 2000-2010

As Deputy Director General, he was head of the Department of Technical Cooperation at the International Atomic Energy Agency, an international agency under the auspices of the United Nations. He took up his position on January 1, 2010, and ended in June, 2015.

Prior to his appointment as Deputy Director-General, he served as the Director and Secretary of the Policy Making Organs of the IAEA. He has also been the Representative of the IAEA Director General to the United Nations. He is a member of the board of trustees of Kuwait's Al-Sumait Prize for African Development.

In September 2015, Aning became a Governor of IAEA Board of Governors and still serves in this position.

== Early life and education ==
Aning was born in 1946 in Ghana. He was educated at Accra Academy and Mfantsipim Secondary School. Aning completed a bachelor's degree in mechanical engineering in 1968 from the University of Science and Technology, graduating with first class honours, as one of the first four persons to obtain first class honours in the Engineering Sciences from the university. That same year, he entered Princeton University receiving a master's degree in Solid State Physics in 1971. Aning obtained a doctoral degree in metallurgical engineering from Columbia University in 1976.

== Career ==
Aning started his working career as a Technical Advisor to the UN Conference on Science and Technology for Development. In January 1980, Aning became a Senior Scientific Affairs Officer of the UN Centre for Science and Technology, remaining in this position for the next twelve years. He worked in this role which had a special focus on science and technology development of developing countries. Aning moved on to the UN Peacekeeping Department, working as a Regional Election Officer for the period between March 1992 to June 1994 . Aning was made a Senior Officer, Office of the Secretary-General later on within August 1998 and January 2000.

In February 2000, Kwaku Aning joined the International Atomic Energy Agency as the Representative of the Director General of the agency to the United Nations in New York.

Aning was the Chairman of the Nuclear Power Institute, GAEC. Aning was also Chairman of the Governing Board, Ghana Atomic Energy Commission.

== Family and personal life ==
Aning married Arafua Apaloo-Aning, a political activist and keen gardener
