= Edwin Nii Adjei =

Ghanaian diplomat

Edwin Nii Adjei is a Ghanaian diplomat who was Ghana's High Commissioner to the Commonwealth of Australia from 2017 to 2022. Prior to this appointment, he was the Acting Chief Director of the Ministry of Foreign Affairs and Regional Integration from July 2016.

== Career ==
As a foreign service officer, Adjei has served in various bureaus in the Ghanaian Ministry of Foreign Affairs and Regional Integration, they include the Information and Culture Bureau, the Personnel and Training Bureau, the Estates and General Service Bureau, and the Africa and Regional Integration Bureau.

He has also held other positions including acting director of the Finance and Accounts Bureau, Director of the International Organisations and Conferences Bureau, Director of the Americas Bureau, and Director of the Policy Planning Monitoring and Evaluation Bureau.

Adjei has also served in various Ghana Missions abroad, including Windhoek, Prague, Beijing, Riyadh, and London. Prior to his appointment as High Commissioner, he served as the Acting Chief Director of the Ministry of Foreign Affairs and Regional Integration from July 2016.

Adjei was appointed as Ghana's High Commissioner to the Commonwealth of Australia with accreditation to New Zealand, Fiji, Papua New Guinea, Solomon Islands, Samoa, Kiribati, Vanuatu, and Tonga by Nana Addo Dankwa Akufo-Addo, the President of Ghana, on 13 September 2017. He presented his credentials to His Excellency General the Honourable Sir Peter Cosgrove (Rtd.) on 23 November 2017. He later presented his credentials to his excellency Jioji Konusi Konrote, and Governor-General Sir Bob Dadae on 29 May 2018 and 16 April 2019 respectively.

== Personal life ==
Adjei is married to Matilda Naa Ayikailey Adjei and is the father of three children.
