= Hilary Denise Arko-Dadzie =

Ghanaian IT specialist and business strategist

- Education: MBA (General Management), BSC (Computer Science)
- Occupations: IT specialist, business strategist

Hilary Denise Arko-Dadzie is a Ghanaian IT specialist and business strategist. She is the first woman to be appointed as the corporate services executive of the African Regional Intellectual Property Organisation (ARIPO) based in Harare, Zimbabwe. She is also the first woman to have been appointed to the five member executive committee role of ARIPO.

== Education ==
Arko-Dadzie attended the Kwame Nkrumah University of Science and Technology, where she acquired a bachelor's degree in Computer Science. She holds an MBA in General Management from the University of East London in UK, as well as IT and Project management certifications from Cisco, and George Washington University.

== Career ==
Arko-Dadzie is currently the first woman to become the corporate services executive of the African Regional Intellectual Property Organisation and the first woman to be appointed to the five member executive committee role of ARIPO. Before her appointment, she worked with Airtel, serving as director of TowerCo for Airtel Ghana now Airtel Tigo and acting head for Airtel Sierra Leone. When she joined Airtel Ghana in 2009 as project manager, she was in charge of strategic projects such as the introduction of Airtel Ghana's 3.75 G offering, Mobile Number Portability and the creation and launch of Airtel Premier.

== Awards ==
- She received an award for her work from the Woman Excel Organisation in Zimbabwe
