= Richard Oblitei Solomon =

Ghanaian lawyer, diplomat and football executive

Ghana Ambassador to Equatorial Guinea
- In office 2006–2009
- Appointed by: John Kufuor
- Preceded by: Dominic Aboagye

Personal details
- Born: Richard Oblitei Solomon; 1956 (age 69–70) Accra, Gold Coast
- Party: New Patriotic Party
- Education: Accra Academy
- Alma mater: University of Ghana; Ghana School of Law; Robert Gordon University; University of Law
- Occupation: lawyer; diplomat

Richard Oblitei Solomon is a Ghanaian lawyer, diplomat and football executive. He was Ghana's ambassador to Equatorial Guinea from 2006 to 2009.

== Early life ==
Solomon had his secondary education at the Accra Academy, where he graduated in 1976. He then proceeded to the University of Ghana to pursue a bachelor's degree in law. He then continued to the Ghana School of Law, where he qualified as a barrister-at-law in 1986. He holds a postgraduate diploma in Oil and Gas Law from the Robert Gordon University, and an LLM from the University of Law in the United Kingdom.

== Career ==
Solomon begun as the Greater Accra second Vice Regional Chairman and later first Vice Regional Chairman of the New Patriotic Party in the early 2000s. In 2006, he was appointed Ghana's ambassador to Equatorial Guinea. He replaced Dominic Aboagye who as consular-general acted in the position. He served in this capacity until 2009.

As a sports fanatic, Solomon was the head of the management board of the Accra Great Olympics F. C. in 2002, and later chairman of the club prior to his ambassadorial appointment. He was made a member of the club's board once more in 2020 when the board of the club was reconstituted.

Solomon has been Vice Chairman of the board of governors of Accra Academy.

Solomon also serves on the board of the Coastal Development Authority (CODA), and the principal of R. O. Solomon Consulting, a law firm in Accra.
