= Samuel Anim Addo =

Ghanaian football manager (born 1976)

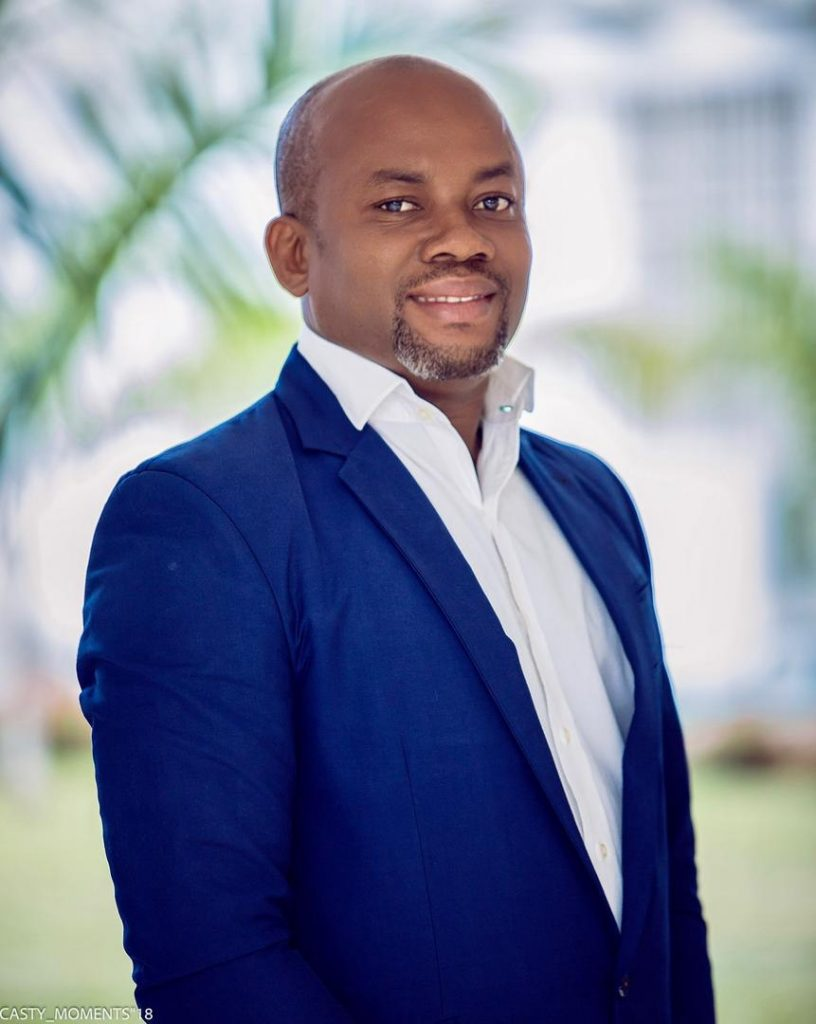
- Born: Samuel Anim Addo; July 31, 1976 (age 49); Accra, Ghana
- Occupation: Business Man
- Known for: Manager of Ghanaian Footballer Asamoah Gyan, Current Board Chairman of Okwawu United S.C.

Samuel Anim Addo (born July 31, 1976) is a Ghanaian football agent and chairman of Okwawu United S.C. He was elected an executive committee member of the Ghana Football Association in 2019.

At the Ghana Football Association, Anim Addo is the Chairman of the Ghana National U-15 Team, and the Vice Chairman of the Ghana Olympic Team (National U-23), the Black Meteors.
