= Manuel Koranteng =

Ghanaian journalist

Manuel Koranteng (born Emmanuel Kojo Koranteng) is a Ghanaian journalist who currently works for the BBC World Service. Until his move to the BBC, Koranteng worked as a Multimedia Journalist and News Anchor with Joy News and Joy FM in Ghana.

== Early life and education ==
Manuel Koranteng attended Accra Academy. He holds a BA in political science and philosophy from the University of Ghana and is currently pursuing a Master of Arts Degree at the University of Sussex in the United Kingdom.

== Career ==
He started his career during his university days at Radio Universe as a Morning Show host then moved to the Multimedia Group of companies where he worked at Joy News TV and Joy FM radio as a news anchor.

=== Advocacy ===
Koranteng has also been involved in advocacy related to workplace wellness and mental health. Through the initiative MentaPulse Africa, he helped organize the Ghana Health & Labour Summit in 2025, an event that sought to promote dialogue on employee well-being and workplace health policies. The summit received support from the Ministry of Labour, Jobs and Employment and contributed to discussions around developing a Workplace Health and Well-Being Declaration in Ghana.

== Awards ==
Year	Nominee / work	Award	Result
2023	Manuel Koranteng	Exclusive Men of the Year (EMY) Africa Awards	Nominated
2022	Manuel Koranteng	26th Ghana Journalists Association (GJA) Awards, Komla Dumor Most Promising Journalist of the Year	Won
2019	Manuel Koranteng	National Union of Ghana Students (NUGS), Best Student Journalist of the Year,	Won
