= Randy Abbey =

Ghanaian journalist

- Born: Ransford Annetey Abbey; 6 January 1974 (age 52); Accra, Ghana
- Education: Accra Academy; Ghana Institute of Management and Public Administration; Ghana Institute of Journalism; Australian Institute of Business; Swiss Business School
- Occupations: Broadcast journalist Sports administrator
- Years active: 2001–, 2006–
- Employers: Metro TV (2001–2025); Ghana Football Association (2006–2014, 2021-); Ghana Cocoa Board (2025 - currently)
- Notable credit(s): Good Morning Ghana, Metro TV (Ghana)

Ransford Annetey Abbey also known as Randy Abbey OV, GM (born 6 January 1974) is a Ghanaian media personality and sports administrator and currently the Chief Executive Officer of Ghana Cocoa Board. He was the previous host of Metro TV morning show Good Morning Ghana, an Executive Council member of the Ghana Football Association, and president of the Kpando Hearts of Lions Football Club.

== Early life and education ==
Abbey was born on 6 January 1974. He had his secondary education at the Accra Academy. Abbey studied for a certificate in Human Resource Management and Public Administration from the Ghana Institute of Management and Public Administration (GIMPA), and an advanced certificate in Public Relations, Advertising, And Marketing from Ghana Institute of Journalism. Abbey received his MBA in General Management from the Australian Institute of Business, Australia, and was awarded his doctorate degree by the SBS Swiss Business School in Zürich, Switzerland.

== Career ==
As a media personality, Abbey has been the host of the morning show; Good Morning Ghana since 2002 until recently where he hosted his last show early January 2025 and resigned . In 2006, he doubled as the spokesperson of the Ghana Football Association, serving in this position for 8 years. In 2014 he completed the takeover of the Kpando Hearts of Lions Football Club, owning over 70% of the shares. In 2019, Abbey was voted member of the Ghana Football Association Executive Committee. He also serves as the Chairman of the Black Satellites management committee. Following the Black Satellites success in the 2021 Africa U-20 Cup of Nations, he was retained as the chairman of the committee for a second term. Abbey has also chaired the Referees Appointment Committee and the Black Meteors Management Committee. He is a member of the Ghana Journalists Association.

In January 2025, Abbey was appointed as acting Chief Executive Officer of Ghana Cocoa Board. Prior to this role, he was the managing director of Ignite Media Group (IMG). He resigned from this position at the end of 2024 as well as from the board of IMG.

== Honours ==
Abbey received the Order of the Volta award in 2006 in recognition of his contribution the growth and development of media in Ghana. That same year, he was awarded a Grand Medal for his role in Ghana's qualification and performance at the World Cup hosted by Germany in 2006.

== Personal life ==
Abbey is married with four children; two sons and two daughters.
