= Chris Kpodo =

Ghanaian diplomat

Chris Kpodo, OV is a Ghanaian diplomat. He was acting Ghana's High Commissioner to the United Kingdom from March 2001 to October 2001, Ghana's ambassador to Congo from 2002 to 2004, and also served as the deputy Minister for Foreign Affairs from 2009 to 2012.

In 2015, the national honour of the Officer of the Order of the Volta was conferred upon him by the then president John Mahama for his service to the nation.
