= Emmanuel Akwetey =

Ghanaian businessman

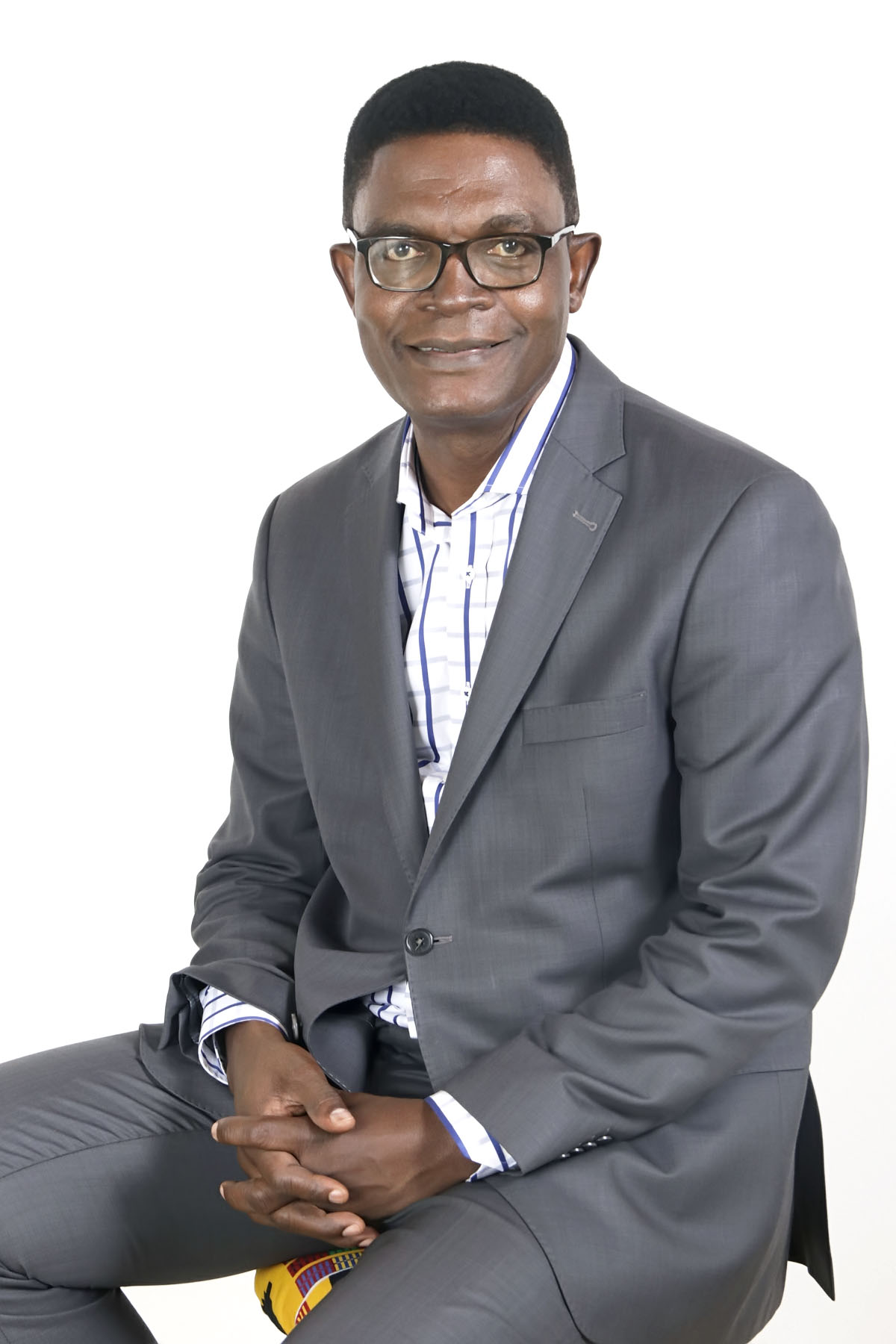
- Born: Accra, Ghana.
- Education: University of Ghana
- Occupations: Political and governance analyst
- Awards: US Embassy Martin Luther King Jr. Award for Peace and Social Justice.

Emmanuel Akwetey is a Ghanaian political and governance analyst. He is the Executive Director for the Institute for Democratic Governance (IDEG).

Akwetey is one of the 13 Advisory Board members of the Ministry of Foreign Affairs and Regional Integration.

== Early life and education ==
Akwetey was born in Accra, Ghana. He started his secondary education at Labone Senior High School but completed in Accra Academy. In 1979, he gained admission into the University of Ghana, Legon, where he earned a Bachelor of Arts in Philosophy and Literature. He obtained a doctorate degree in International Politics and Development at the University of Stockholm, Sweden.

== Career ==
Akwetey was a lecturer at the University of Stockholm, Sweden. He founded the Institute of Democratic Governance (IDEG) in 2000 and he is the Executive Director.

In February 2015, Akwetey received the US Embassy Martin Luther King Jr. Award for Peace and Social Justice.
