= Benjamin Clement Eghan =

Ghanaian civil servant (died 2026)

Benjamin Clement Eghan (died 24 March 2026) was a Ghanaian civil servant. He was Ghana's High Commissioner to Malaysia from 2013 to 2017, and served as Secretary to the Cabinet from 2009 to 2013 in the John Atta-Mills administration.

From 1993 to 2002, Eghan served in the rank of chief director in Ghanaian governmental ministries which include the Ministry of Environment, Science and Technology and the Ministry of Manpower and Employment. He was a Senior Lecturer and Dean of the GIMPA Public Services School before his recall into government service by president John Atta-Mills.

Eghan died on 22nd March 2026. His burial service was held on Thursday 18th June at the Forecourt of the State House.

He had Four children: Benjamin Kwesi Eghan, Sabina Ekua Eghan-Williams, Alexina Paula Akosua Karimanzira, Peter George Ekow Eghan.

Widow: Dr. Akosua Dzifa Eghan
