= Accra Academy =

Male secondary school in the Greater Accra Region, Ghana

- Accra Academy Crest

Location
- P. O. Box GP 501; Bubuashie; Accra, Greater Accra Region; Ghana; 5°34′18″N 0°14′38″W

Information
- Type: day and boarding high school
- Motto: Esse Quam Videri
- Established: 20 July 1931 (95 years ago)
- School district: Accra Metropolitan District.
- Chairman of the Board of Governors: Jones Victor Dotse
- Headmaster: Eric Ebo Sey
- Staff: 45 (non-teaching)
- Faculty: 75
- Grades: Forms' (1–3)
- Gender: Boys
- Enrollment: 5,460
- Campus size: 37 acres
- Campus type: Urban
- Colors: Yellow and blue
- Slogan: Bleoo
- Athletics: Track and field
- Athletics conference: Greater Accra super-zonal athletics
- Mascot: Lion
- Nickname: Little Legon
- Alumni: Bleoobii
- Website: accraacademy.edu.gh

Accra Academy is a boys' high school located at Bubuashie near Kaneshie in the Greater Accra Region, Ghana. It admits both boarding and day students. Founded as a private school in 1931, it gained the status of a Government-Assisted School in 1950.

The academy runs courses in business, general science, general arts, agricultural science and visual arts, leading to the award of a West African Senior School Certificate.

The academy's founders provided tuition to students who wanted a secondary-grade education but who did not have financial support to enable them do so. The first principal and co-founder, Kofi Konuah periodically travelled to some of the major towns in each region of the country to organize entrance examinations for students, so as to offer the brilliant but needy among them the opportunity of education in the Accra Academy. The academy no longer offers special admission to brilliant but needy students but, as per a 2005 general directive from the Ghana Education Service, admits its students through a school selection placement system.

Accra Academy was ranked 8th out of the top 100 high schools in Africa by Africa Almanac in 2003, based upon quality of education, student engagement, strength and activities of alumni, school profile, internet and news visibility. Amongst its achievements include; being the first school to have produced successive Chief Justices of Ghana, and the only school to have produced successive Ghanaian Speakers of Parliament. It is also the first school to have produced a head of government and a deputy head of government in the same Ghanaian government.

== History ==
=== Start in Ellen House (1931–1961) ===
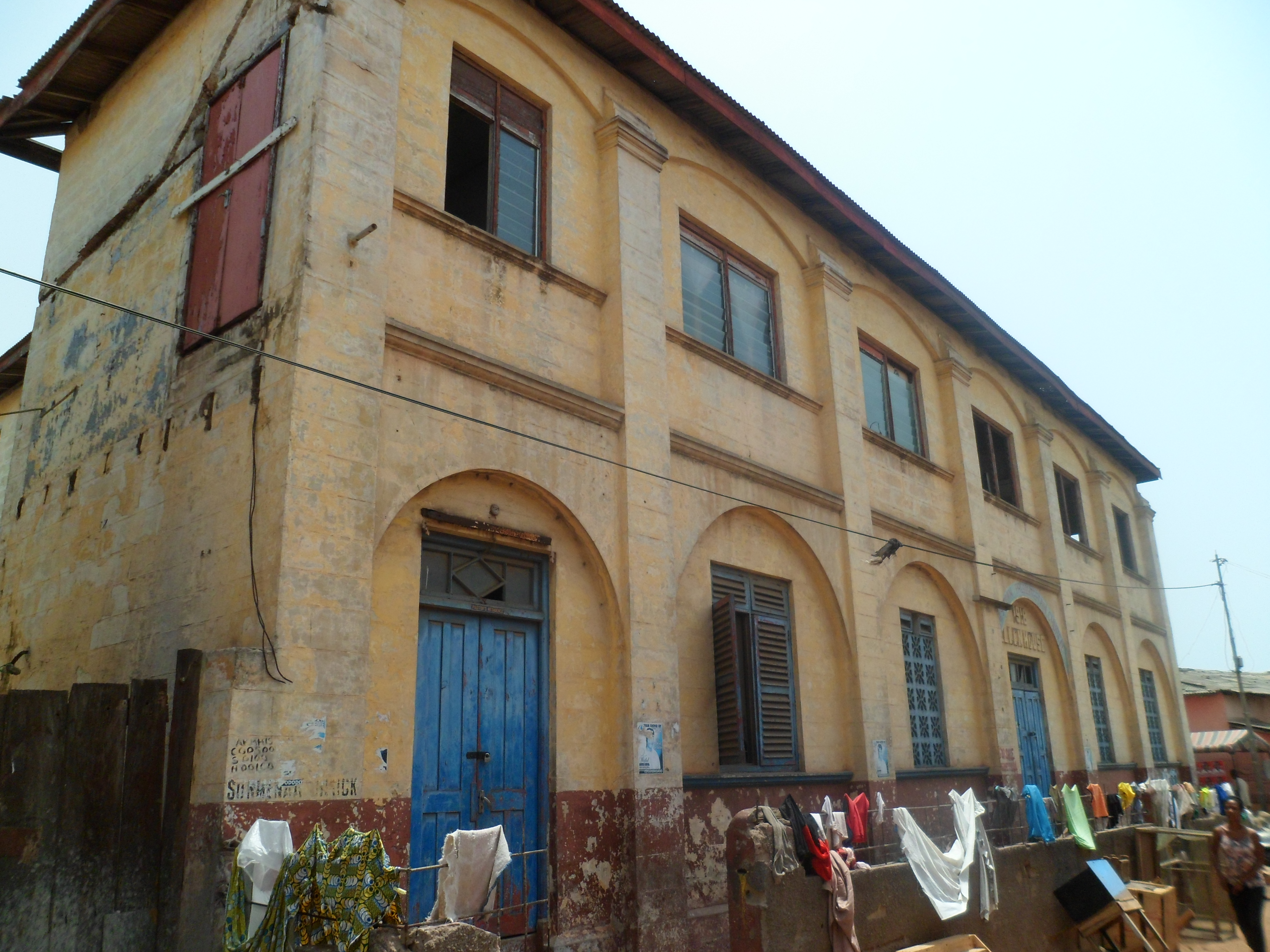
Ellen House

Accra Academy was founded by Messrs. Kofi George Konuah, Samuel Neils Awuletey, Gottfried Narku Alema and James Akwei Halm-Addo on 20 July 1931, at Mantse Agbonaa, a suburb of James Town in Accra. They founded the academy with an initial capital pooled from their individual contributions. Their aim of founding the academy was to provide access to education for students who could not enroll at the limited existing schools due to financial constraints. For this reason, the founders instituted a fee installment policy to encourage and support these disadvantaged students to enroll at the academy.

The academy's founders operated the school from a one-storey house that provided classrooms for the students. The facility was named Ellen House after its leaser, Ellen Buckle. Ellen was the widow of Vidal J. Buckle, a lawyer and Gold Coast elite, who built the property. The academy began work with a student enrolment of 19. The founders of the academy along with two others; M. F. Dei-Anang and S.S. Sackey, comprised the pioneer teaching staff of the school. The academy operated as a day-school till it began accommodating students in Claremont House in 1935, a single-storey building adjoining Ellen House, also a property leased out by Ellen Buckle.

In December 1932, the academy presented its first batch of ten students for the Junior Cambridge School Certificate Examination, seven out of whom passed the examination. In the annual report for the academic year 1938–39, Accra Academy received positive recognition. The report described it as a well-funded institution that is effectively administered, with a student body of 469 boys. In 1939, the academy presented 45 students for the Senior Cambridge School Certificate Examination, out of whom 42 students passed, with 10 students obtaining exemption from the London Matriculation Examination.

In 1947, a recommendation was made to the director of education to grant the academy the status of a Government Assisted School. The recommendation was approved, and the academy begun operating as a Government Assisted school from 1 January 1950. In 1950, the academy also won the prestigious Aggrey Shield at its first Inter-Collegiate Sports Meeting.

=== Relocation to Bubiashie in 1961 ===
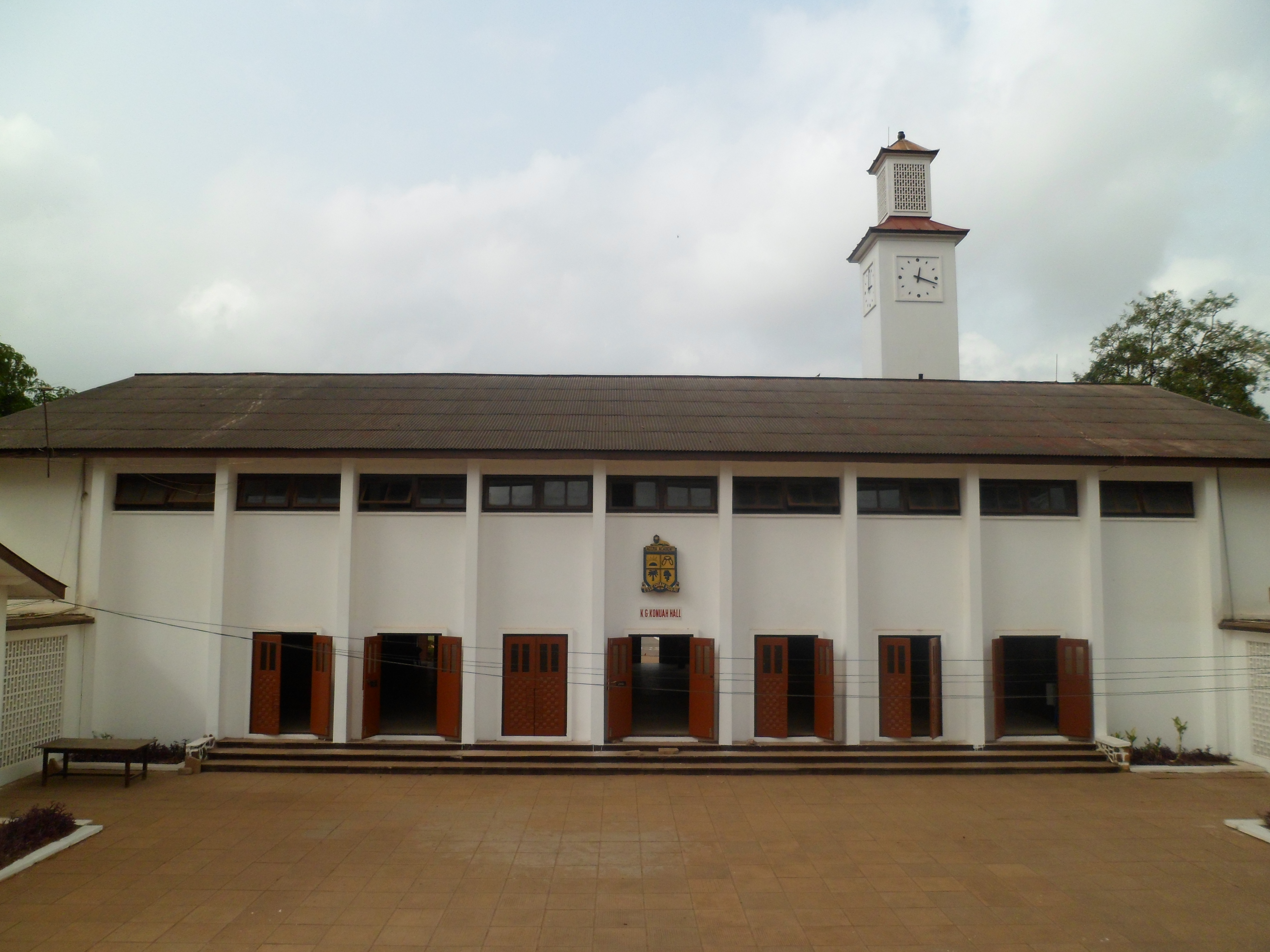
K. G. Konuah hall

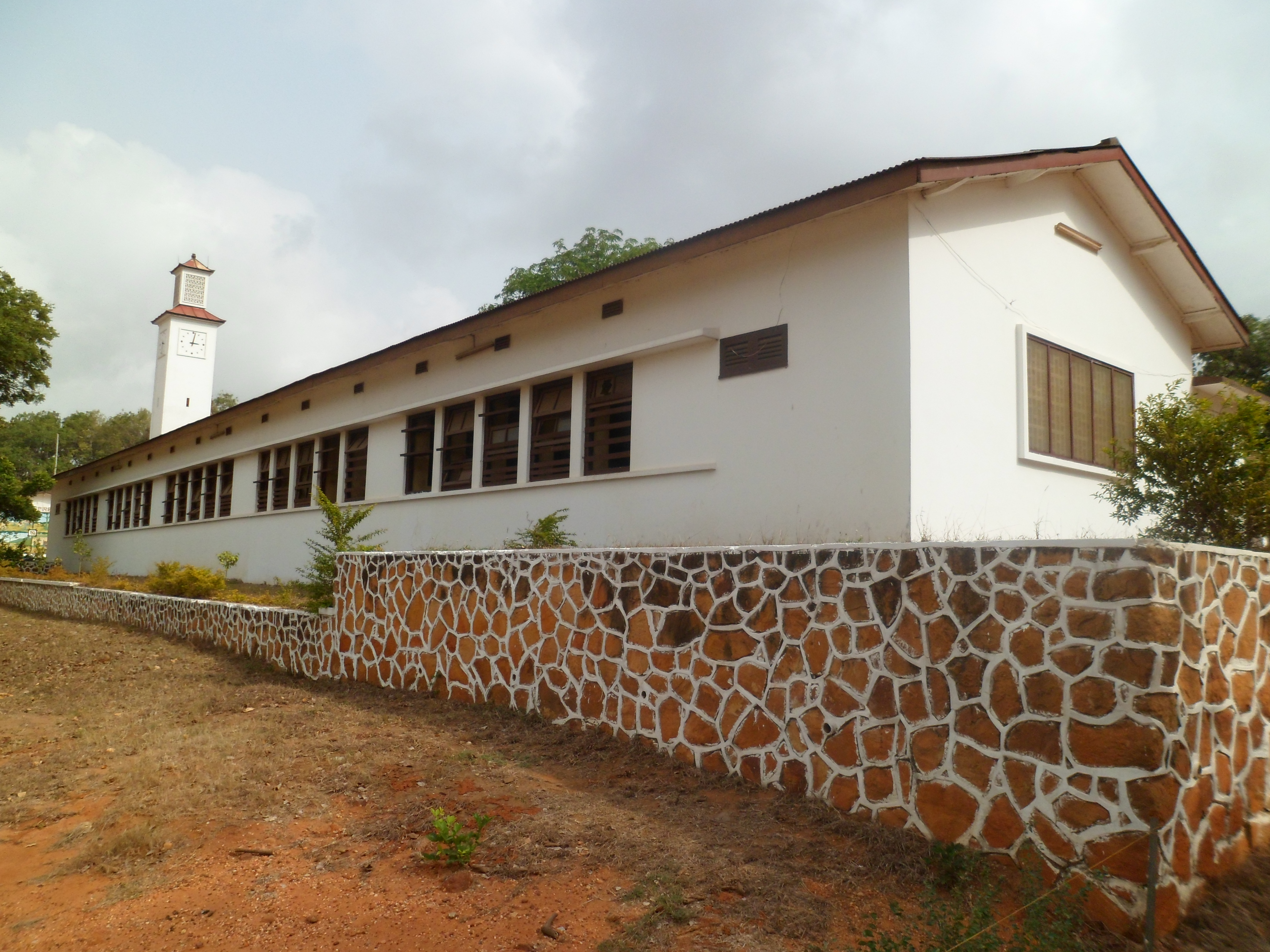
S.S Sackey Block

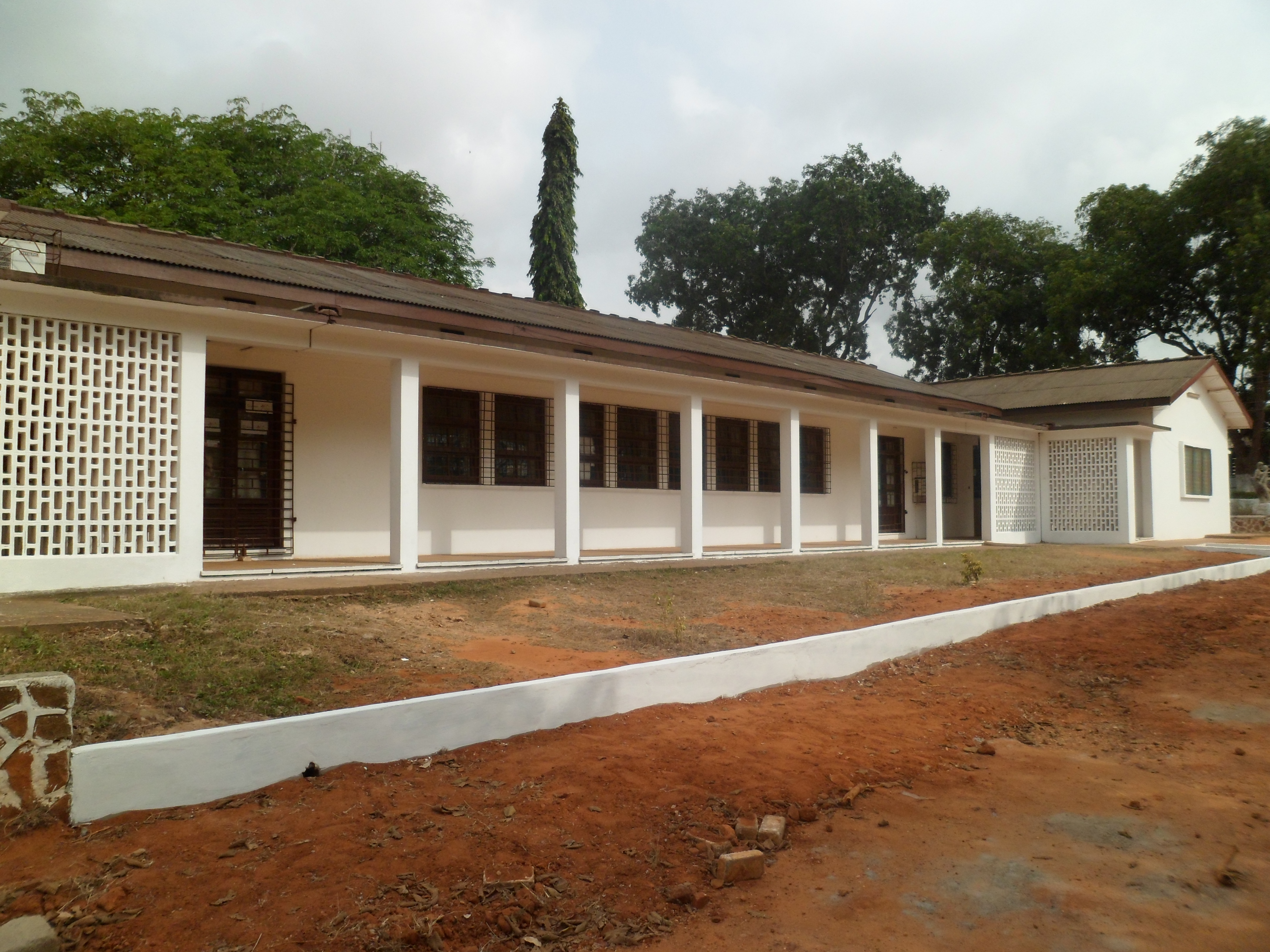
Aglionby library

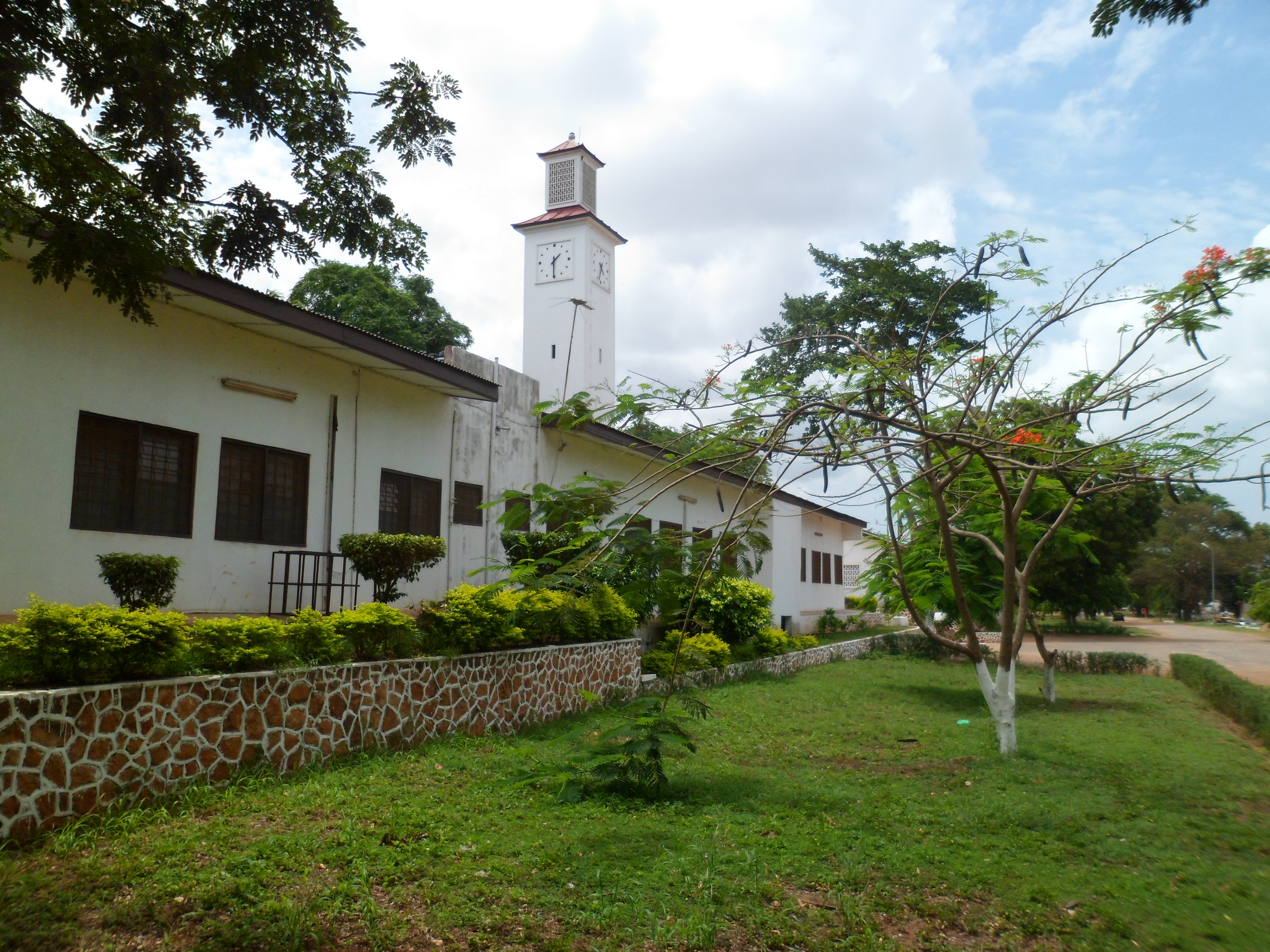
Administration Block

Due to a steady increase in the number of applicants applying for enrolment in the academy, the academy's administrators began preparations to relocate the academy to a larger and permanent site. The initial site acquired to relocate the school was situated at Kokomlemle; however, this site had to be abandoned as a result of a prolonged litigation concerning the ownership of the land. A second site, which was located at Korle Gonno, was also given up because of its remote location. The search for a new school site ended in 1956 when J. A. Halm-Addo succeeded in lobbying the Convention People's Party government to relocate and expand the academy as part of its accelerated development plan. Owing to his efforts, Accra Academy was offered a 37-acre plot of land at Bubuashie, off the Winneba Road.

Barnes, Hubbard & Arundel were the architects and planners of the first buildings on the new campus. J. Monta & Sons was awarded the contract to develop the new school site in October 1959, and by July 1961, presented the newly developed site with new buildings to the school administrators.

In September 1961, the academy relocated from Ellen House to the present site at Bubuashie, funded by the CPP government. A ceremony to officially open up the new buildings was held on 3 February 1962 and A. J. Dowuona-Hammond, Minister for Education and incidentally an old boy, unveiled a commemorative plaque. The first dormitory block for students was completed later in 1966.

The academy acquired the nickname Little Legon shortly after the new school site was commissioned, when some students from the Western Region who had gained admission into the University of Ghana, reported at the academy instead of the University of Ghana, apparently confused by the close similarity between the infrastructure of both educational institutions.

In 1981, the academy celebrated its golden jubilee with a student enrolment of 900 and a teaching staff of 52. This anniversary birthed the school song and school anthem. In that year, historian Robert Addo-Fening documented the early history of the Accra Academy for publishing as a Golden Jubilee Brochure. This source was to serve as a reference point for the first history book on the school published in 2021 titled Accra Aca Bleoo: The History of the Accra Academy from Jamestown to Bubuashie authored by Simon Ontoyin.

In 2001, Accra Academy celebrated its 70th Anniversary. This milestone was marked by a series of events including the first homecoming reunion of the 21st century, a float to Ellen House, a Founders’ Day durbar, and a grand Speech and Prize-Giving Day graced by President John Agyekum Kufuor. The anniversary also saw the introduction of the school's Hall of Fame and the establishment of the K. G. Konuah and J. A. Halm-Addo Awards to honour alumni for their contributions to the school's development.

== Overview ==
=== Insignia ===
Object	Significance
Lion	King of Beasts. Represents the Lion of Justice exemplifying poise and controlled power.
Sun	Represents the brilliance of knowledge, banishing ignorance and superstition.
Three chains	The union of three chains stands for the Pauline virtues of Faith, Hope and Love.
Palm tree	The palm tree thrives where other trees can hardly stand. Here it represents triumph over environmental handicaps.
Cocoa tree	Symbol of Ghana's wealth. Here it symbolizes the proper use of wealth to sweeten the cares of life.
Esse Quam Videri	written in Latin, translates as "To be, rather than to seem"

=== Governance ===
Headmaster	Tenure of office
K. G. Konuah, C.B.E, G.M	1931 to 1952
A. K. Konuah	1953 to 1967
J. K. Okine	1967 to 1986
Vincent Birch Freeman	1986 to 1996
Beatrice Lokko	1997 to 2005
Samuel Ofori-Adjei	2005 to 2017
William Foli Garr	2017 to 2020
Emmanuel Ofoe Fiemawhle	2020 to 2025
Eric Ebo Sey	As of 2025

== Academics ==
=== Admission ===
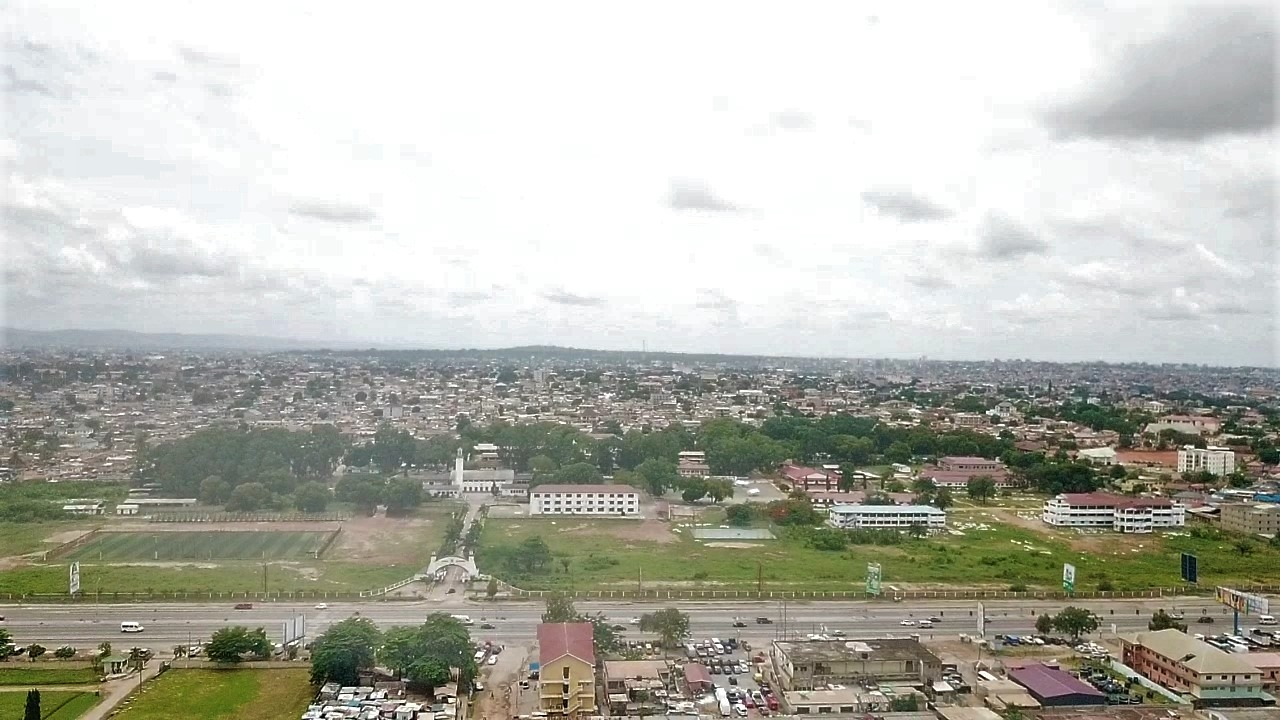
Aerial View of Accra Academy

Being a senior high school for boys, the academy offers admission to boys only. Gaining entry into the academy is competitive, and open to students who have completed Junior high school. Prior to writing their Basic Education Certificate Examination (BECE), final year Junior High School students, register for senior high school through a computerized school selection and placement system (CSSPS) which was introduced by the Ghana Education Service in 2005.

Unlike in the previous grading system in which a candidate's overall academic performance in the Basic Education Certificate Examination was obtained by computing the aggregate on the candidate's best six subject scores, the raw scores obtained by a candidate in the Basic Education Certificate Examination determines the candidates overall academic performance in the exam under the computerized school selection and placement system. Because the computerized school selection and placement system uses a deferred-acceptance algorithm which ensures that Junior high school applicants are admitted strictly based on academic merit, administrators of the academy use raw scores obtained in the Basic Education Certificate Examination to admit applicants from Junior High School.

=== Curriculum ===
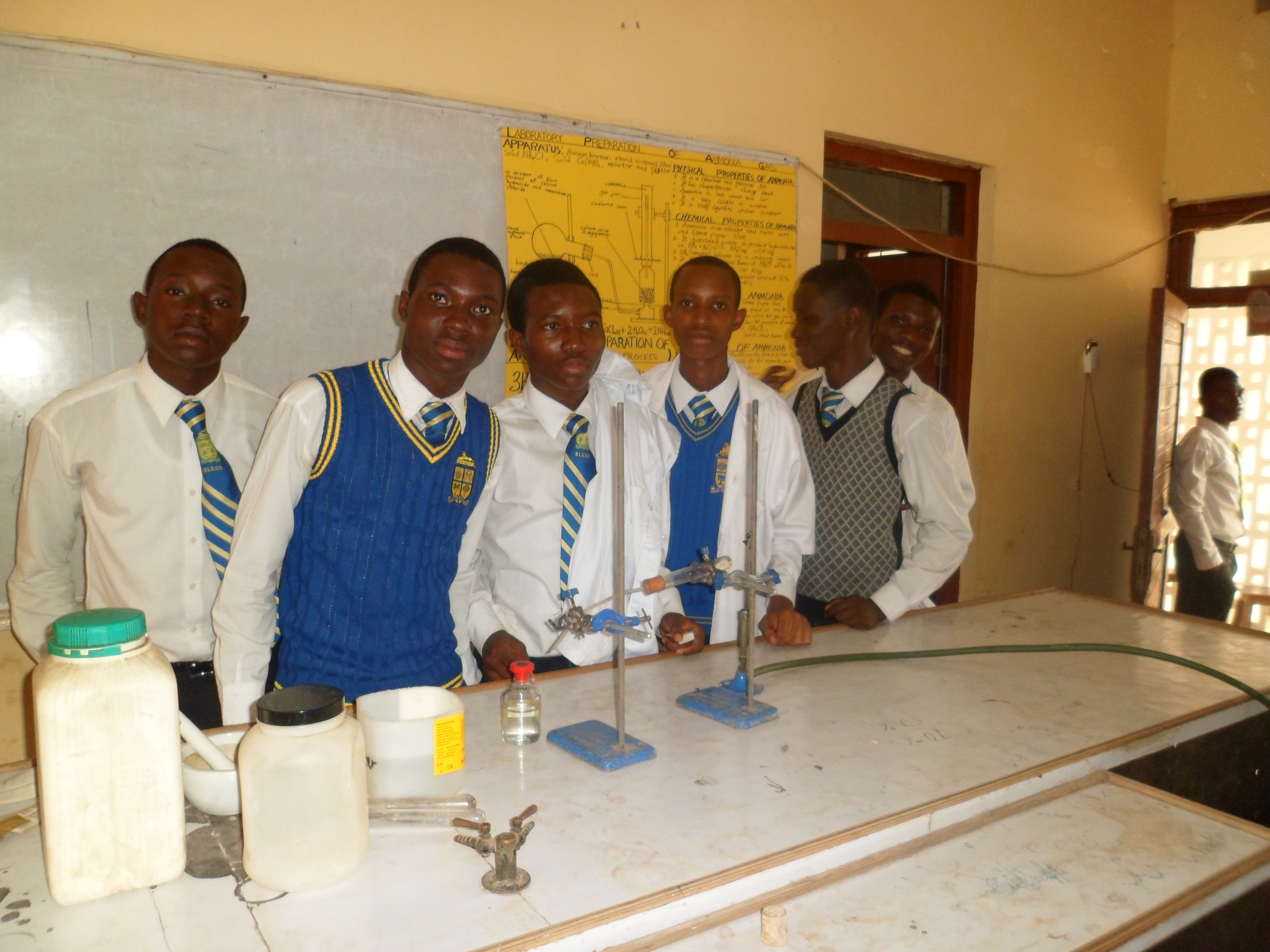
81st Anniversary Science Exhibition

The programmes run in the academy are: general arts, general science, agriculture, business and visual arts. As part of their computerized school selection and placement system registration, final year junior high school applicants select four elective courses. Unlike elective courses, core courses are offered to all students, irrespective of their programme of study. The academy's core courses are: English language, core mathematics, social studies, integrated science, ICT (core) and physical education, however, students are only examined both internally and externally as well, in the first five aforementioned courses.

The academy's curriculum like that of other senior high schools in Ghana, operates in a three-year academic cycle, from form one to form three. The beginning of the first academic year marks the enrolment of the student in the academy, while the ending of the third academic year marks the graduation of the student.

=== Academic performance ===
The academy has over the years been ranked among the best performing senior high schools in Ghana. In 2009, the academy was listed among six other schools in the Greater Accra Region, which had 60% or more of its candidates qualifying for tertiary education. In a survey, the academy was listed among secondary schools in Ghana that contribute 50% or more of its students to universities.

In 2012, a former student was adjudged by WAEC as the best candidate in Business at the previous year WASSCE. In 2017, a former student was adjudged as the second overall best candidate and the second best candidate in General Science for the previous year WASSCE in Ghana.

In 2018, 676 students of the school sat the WASSCE. 640 students of this number passed in all 8 courses taken (i.e. obtained grades between A1 to C6). This represented a percentage pass of 94.7% and percentage of students of qualified academic enrolment status into a university programme in Ghana. In 2020, 672 students of the school sat the WASSCE. 633 students of this number had passes in 6 courses (i.e. 4 core courses and 2 elective courses). This represented a percentage pass of 94.2% in relation to passes in 6 courses.

== Student life ==
=== Facilities ===
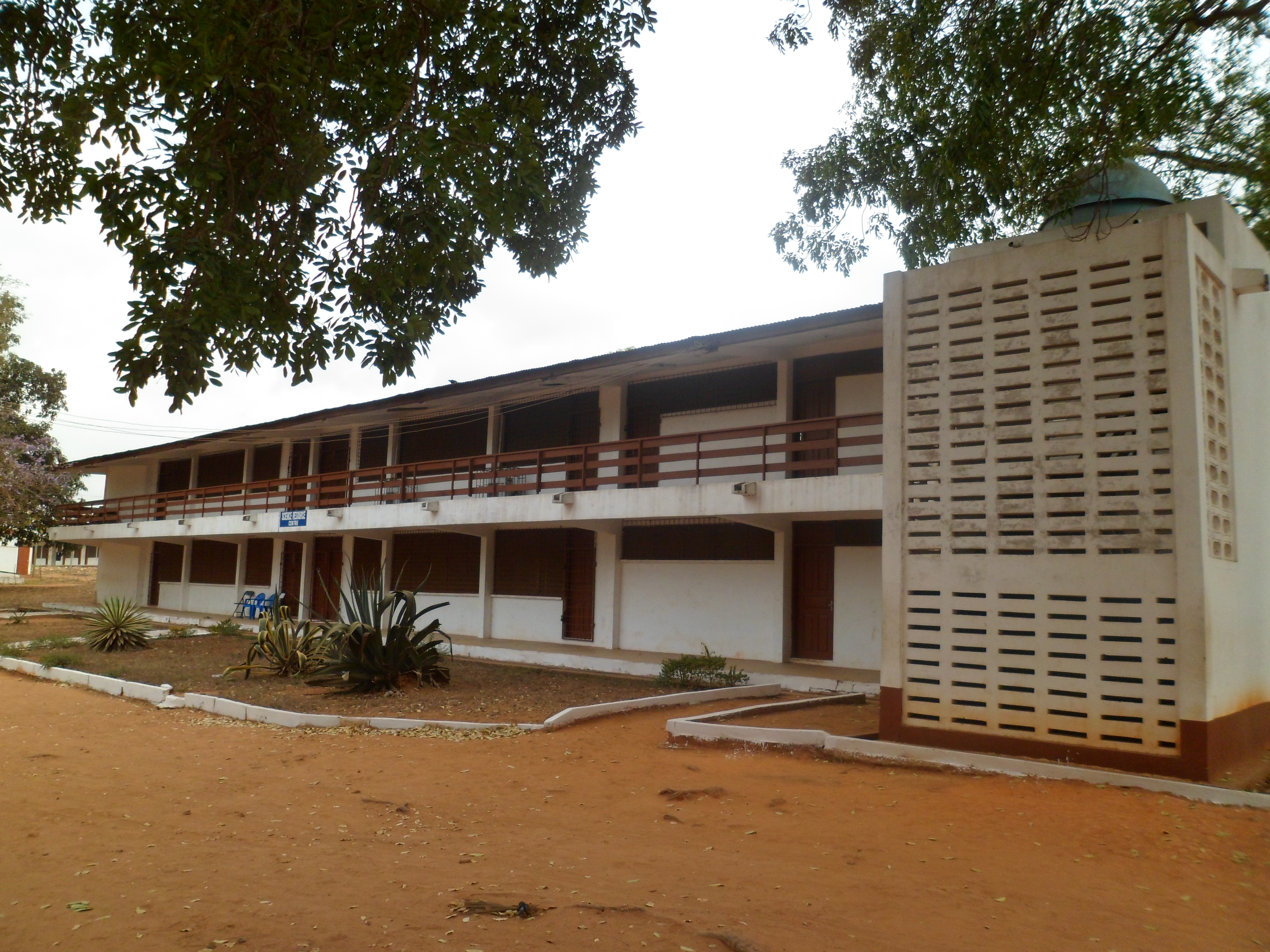
Science Resource Centre

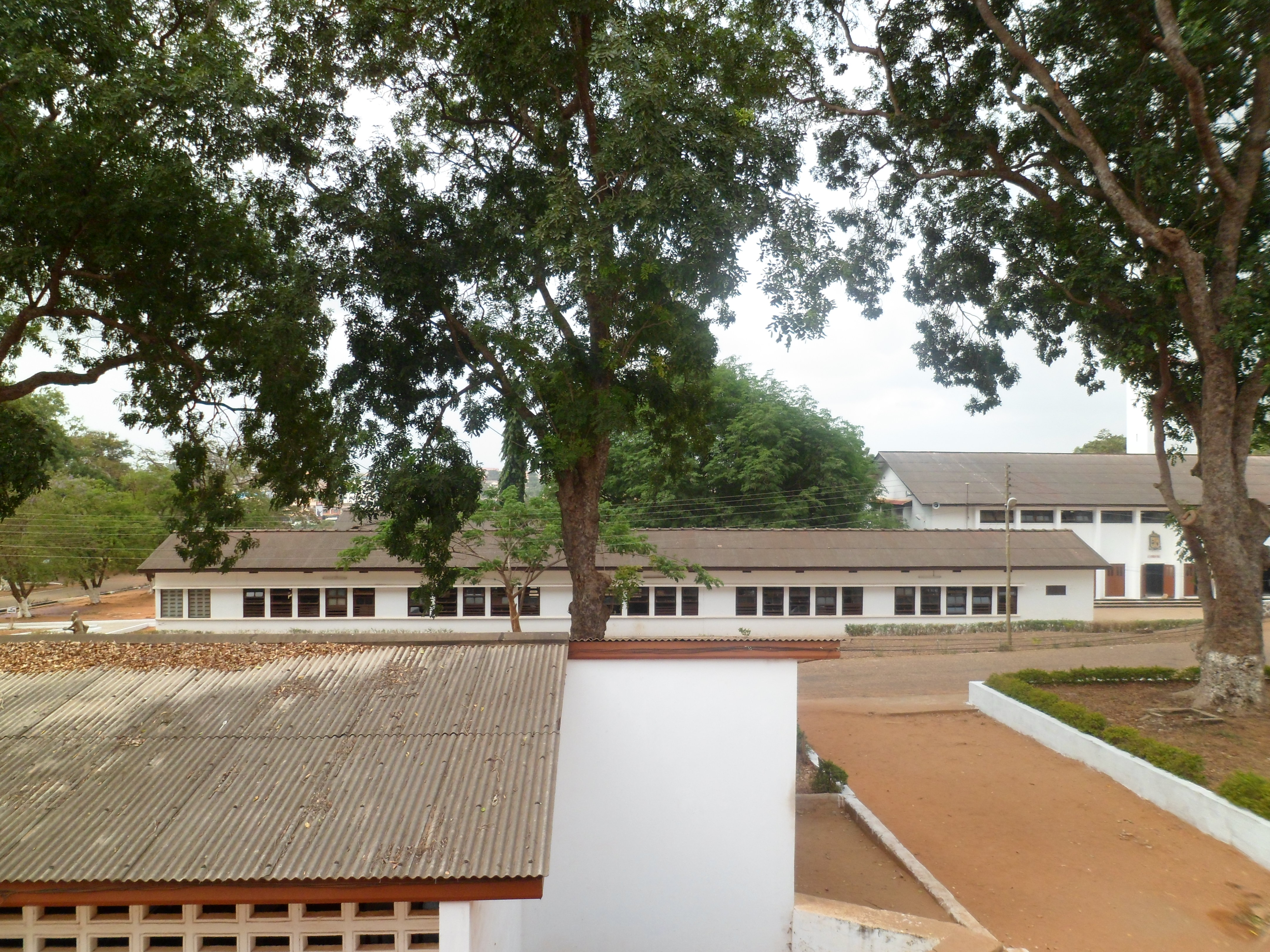
Accra Academy campus

In 2015, Asamoah Gyan, an alumnus and captain of the senior side of the male national football team, announced he will be funding an astro-turf football pitch for the school. At its completion in 2017, the facility became the first football astro-turf pitch in a Ghanaian school. In 2019, the class of 1982 built a multipurpose court for the games of basketball and lawn tennis.

In 2017, Tullow Ghana completed a refurbishment of the school's science laboratory block. During the refurbishment, the class of 1990 provided and fitted interactive projectors and smartboards to laboratories within the refurbished block. In 2023, the class of 1986 opened up an edifice for an ICT laboratory in fulfillment of a promise the group had made in 2017 at the school's speech and prize-giving day.

=== Halls of residence ===
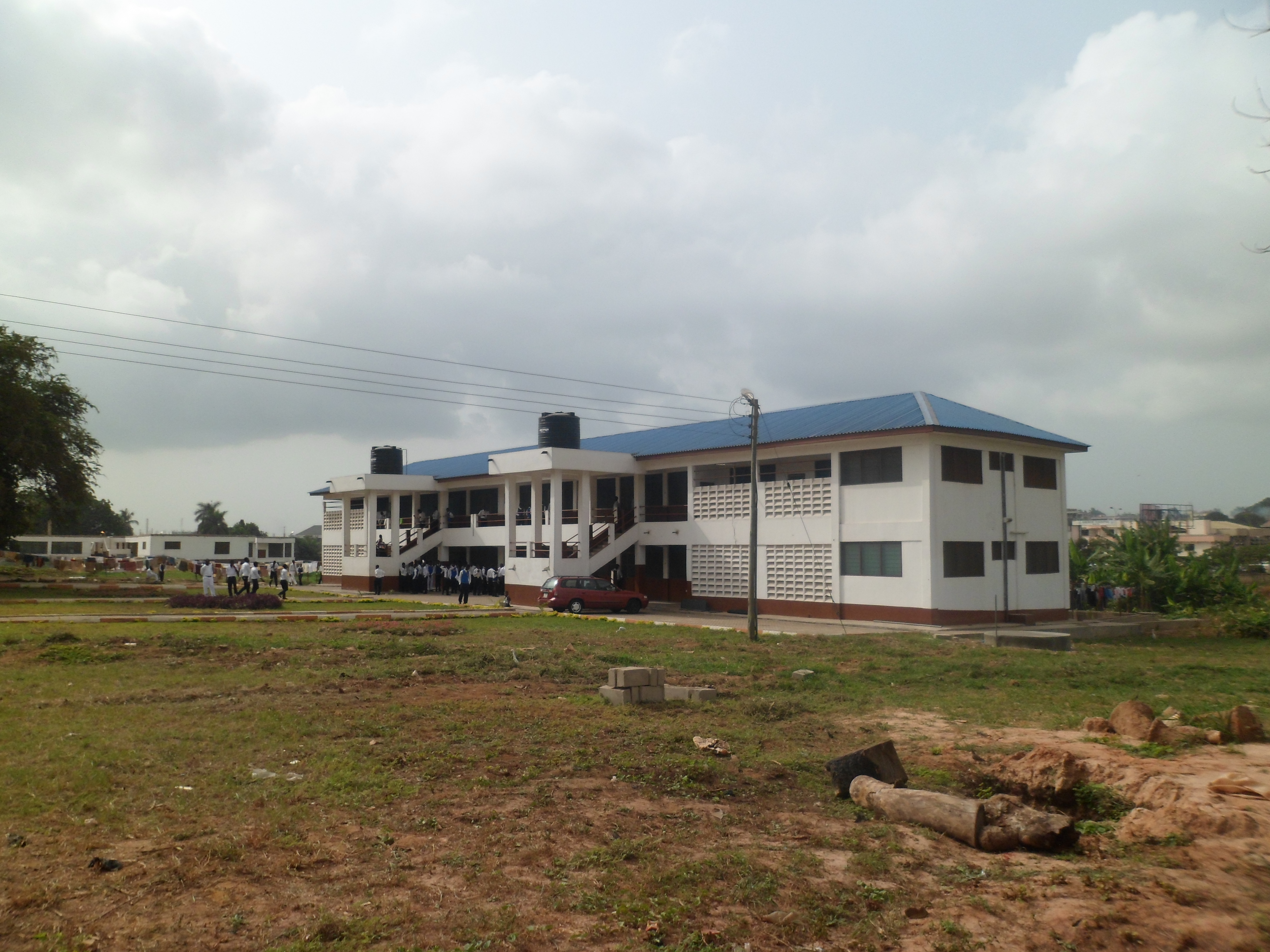
Nana Akuoko Sarpong hall

The academy has eight halls of residence. The first four of these halls were inaugurated as part of the school's 1967 Annual Speech and Prize Giving Day activities. Among the four, three were later renamed after founding fathers of the school, with the exception of Kofi Konuah, while the fourth is named after Mrs. Ellen Buckle. The remaining four halls were inaugurated as part of the school's 83rd Founders' Day Celebration in 2014. They are named after alumni; Nana Akuoko Sarpong, Peter Ala Adjetey, Nana Wereko Ampem and Nana Awuah Darko Ampem.

=== Regulations and sanctions ===
The Accra Academy maintains strict rules on discipline. A student undertaking a mild punishment is asked to carry out cleaning, scrubbing, sweeping, weeding or disposing of refuse. A student who commits a grievous school offence is made to proceed on an indefinite suspension or is dismissed from the academy, a notable example of which is the dismissal of Chuckie Taylor, the son of the former president of Liberia, Charles Taylor, on grounds of possessing drugs and weapons.

=== Associations and clubs ===
Academy students are involved in Extracurricular activities through their membership in school associations and clubs, some of which include:

- Alzheimer's Foundation of America (Youth wing),
- Cadet Corp,
- Campus Ministry,
- Debaters Club,
- Drama Club,
- Geography Club,
- German Club,
- Ghana United Nations Students and Youth Association (GUNSA).,
- Global Teenager Project (Ghana),
- Head of State Award Scheme,
- HIV/AIDS Kickers Youth club.,
- Investment Club,
- Junior Achievement Club,
- Pan-African Club,
- Robotics Club,
- Rotaract Club,
- Science Club,
- Scrabble Club,
- Scripture Union,
- Students Representation Council – S R C,
- Students World Assembly
- The Earth and Wildlife Club

=== Sports ===
As early as 1934, the academy's administrators hired a sports-master to organize the sporting activities of the academy. Students were trained in athletics, soccer, and hockey. The academy won the Aggrey Shield together with seven other trophies in the annual inter-college athletics competition held in 1950, and through which the academy became recognized in Ghanaian inter-college sports, while the words "Accra Aca, Bleoo" came to also serve as a slogan for the school.

== Annual events ==
The academy's administrators and alumni association organize annual events for the students and alumni of the school, including a speech and prize-giving day ceremony, a memorial lecture and a Home-coming Reunion. The annual speech and prize-giving day ceremony award the school's best performing students. Occasionally retired as well as active teachers and staff of the academy are awarded for their contributions to the school. The Konuah-Halm-Addo-Awuletey-Alema Memorial Lectures (formerly Accra Academy Foundation Lectures) was instituted in 1991 by Vincent Freeman, then academy headmaster, as part of the school's 60th anniversary celebrations. Home-coming reunions are usually organised as part of the academy's anniversary celebrations. They are usually characterized by bonding activities that include the singing of popular school songs called Jamas and the playing of table tennis, football and snooker.

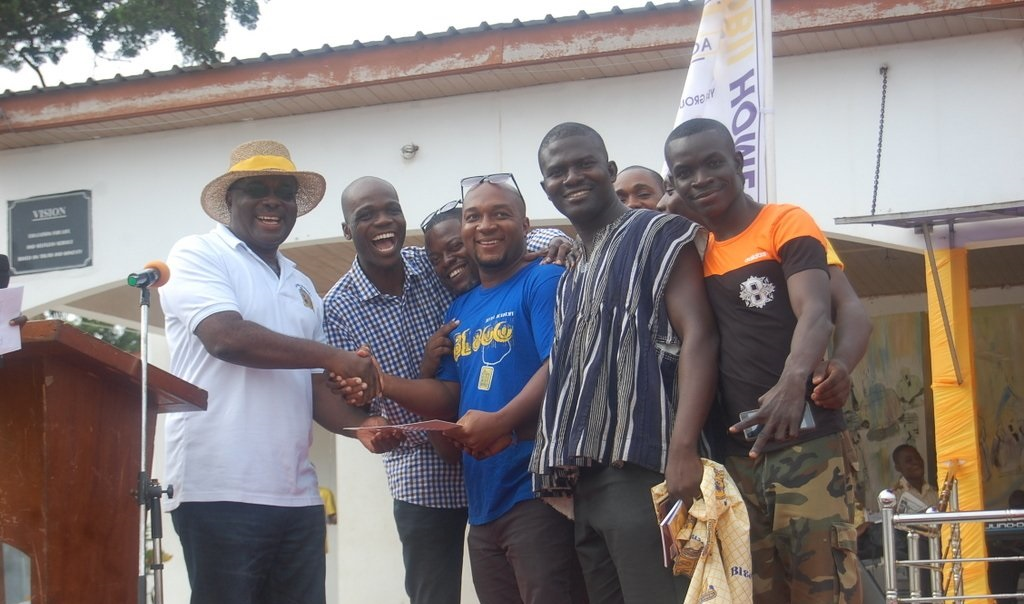
A Year Group receiving a citation

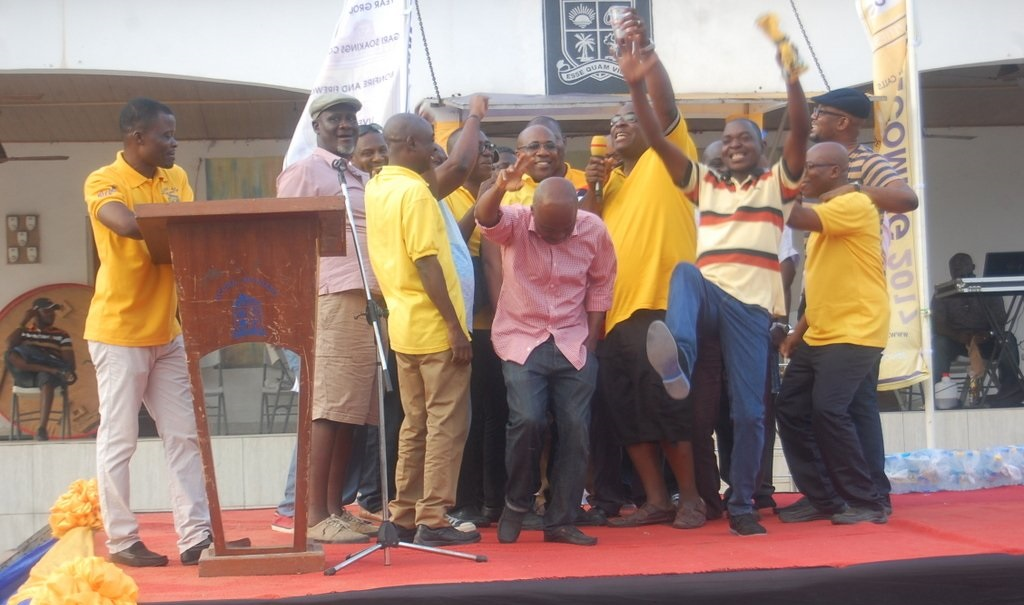
Bleoo '85 having fun on Stage

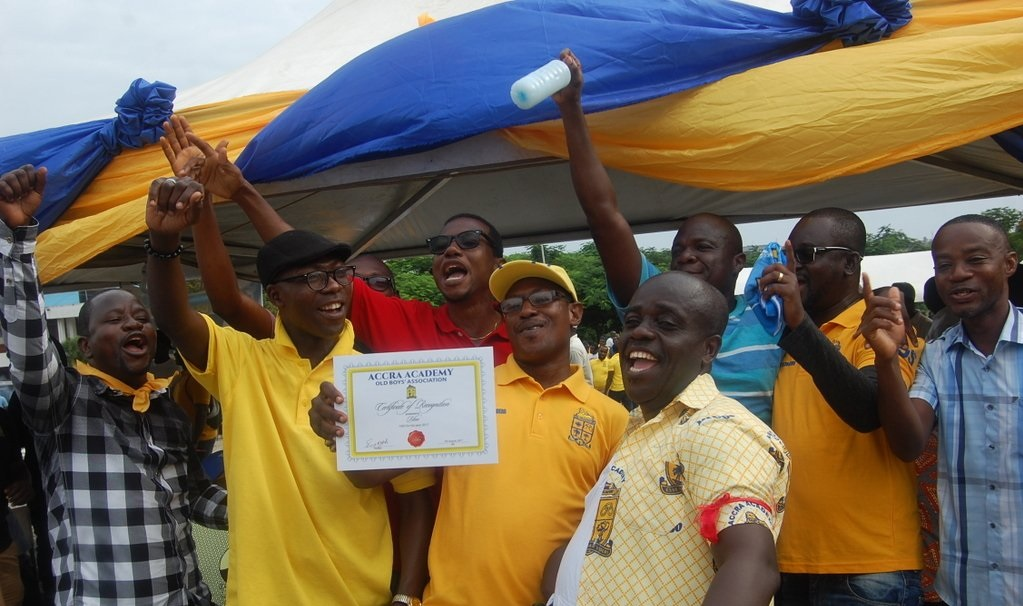
A Year Group poses for a photo

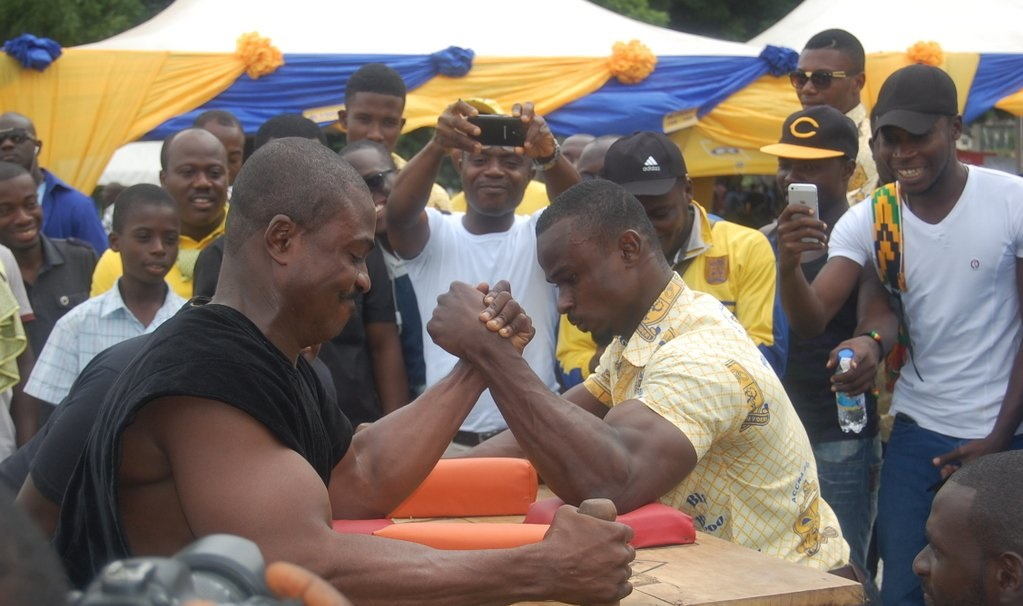
Two alumni engage in an arm wrestling contest

== Old Boys Association ==
The association functions as an old boys network which is opened to any person who has been enrolled in the academy for more than one year.

The association has a governing body consisting of: a president, secretary, treasurer and a public relations officer elected at an annual general meeting for a fixed tenure of office. They form the executive committee of the association and have the responsibility of planning and executing all programmes or events that are organised by the association. The association is operated from a national secretariat, which doubles as the association's headquarters in Accra. It is located on the premises of the school and is responsible for coordinating the activities of all year groups and regional secretariats of the association. It also serves as a liaison between alumni and the school.

== Notable alumni ==
The school has educated many notable alumni, including a member of the big six, a Ghanaian head of state, a deputy head of state and cabinet ministers in all four Ghanaian republics. 3 speakers of parliament attended the school, as well as 2 chief justices of Ghana, 1 chief justice of Nigeria, and 1 chief justice of Kenya. Thus, all three arms of government (executive, legislature and judiciary) have been led by the school's alumni. The national assemblies which deliberated over and presented the draft constitutions of Ghana's Third Republic and Fourth Republic were both chaired by alumni. All three service branches of the Ghana Armed Forces (army, navy and air force) have also been led by alumni, with two of these service branches having its pioneering Ghanaian heads having attended the school.

=== Politics ===
In the field of politics, Ghana's second head of government, J. A. Ankrah, and his deputy, J. W. K. Harlley were old boys. The school has educated three speakers of parliament: Daniel Francis Annan, Peter Ala Adjetey, and Edward Doe Adjaho.

Ako Adjei, named amongst the big six, attended the school. Henry P. Nyemitei was general secretary of the Convention People's Party (CPP) during the first general election held in 1951. A decade after, in 1961, H. H. Cofie Crabbe run the erstwhile CPP's headquarters as executive secretary.

Three successive national chairmen of the New Patriotic Party have been old boys (Peter Ala Adjetey, Samuel Odoi-Sykes, Harona Esseku). Harry Sawyerr, a founding executive of the National Democratic Congress and the only minister of the Third Republic to have again served as a minister in the Fourth Republic, is an alumnus.

Paul Boateng, the first person of colour to be appointed a cabinet minister in a UK government, is also an alumnus. At the 2024 Ghanaian general election, two old boys Nana Kwame Bediako and Mohammed Frimpong stood to be voted as president of Ghana.

=== Law ===
In law, Accra Academy alumni include Ghanaian Chief Justices Samuel Azu Crabbe, and Fred Apaloo, and acting Chief Justices; G. C. Mills-Odoi, N. Y. B. Adade, and Jones Dotse. In all, nine Supreme Court Justices have been educated at the school, including Justice Samuel Adibu Asiedu, an active justice of the Supreme Court of Ghana.

Internationally, Walter Onnoghen was Chief Justice of Nigeria, Apaloo served as Chief Justice of Kenya, Azu Crabbe was Justice of the East African Court of Appeal and Frederick Bruce-Lyle was the longest serving judge of the Eastern Caribbean Supreme Court.

Four Attorneys-General attended the school including the first Ghanaian Attorney General of Ghana, George Mills-Odoi; the first woman to hold the office, Betty Mould-Iddrisu; Nicholas Yaw Boafo Adade; and Gustav Koranteng-Addow. Prior to the merger of the office of Minister of Justice with that of Attorney-General, Ako Adjei was Ghana's first Minister of Justice.

Peter Ala Adjetey is a former president of the Ghana Bar Association. The current Special Prosecutor of Ghana, Kissi Agyebeng, is an old boy.

=== Public Service ===
Nathan Quao, Gilbert Boahene and Ben Eghan have been Secretary to the Cabinet. Robert Dodoo, a former Head of the Civil Service, attended the school.

Joseph Odunton was the first black African to hold an appointment at Buckingham Palace. Edward Quist-Arcton was the first Ghanaian forestry head; Harry Dodoo was the first Ghanaian to lead the Ghana Cocoa Board; E. N. Omaboe was the first Ghanaian to be Government Statistician.

V. C. R. A. C. Crabbe established the first Electoral Commission, and J. W. K. Harlley became the first Inspector General of Police since the title was officially used in 1966.

Three alumni have served as Chief of Army Staff of the Ghana Army, including the first Ghanaian to hold the office, Joseph Arthur Ankrah, who later served as Chief of the Defence Staff. The others are Neville Alexander Odartey-Wellington and Joseph Narh Adinkrah. The first Ghanaian appointed Chief of Naval Staff, David Hansen, was also an alumnus, while former Chief of Air Staff Frederick Asare Bekoe is also an alumnus.

=== Royalty ===
Monarchs who attended the school include Osagyefo Kuntunkununku II, 34th Okyenhene and 7th president of the National House of Chiefs; Oyeeman Wereko Ampem II, Ohene of Amanokrom; Nana Akuoko Sarpong, Omanhene of Agogo Traditional Area; and Neenyi Ghartey VII, the Omanhene of Winneba, Effutu Traditional Area.

=== Academia ===
Frank Gibbs Torto FGA, a chemist, was the first Ghanaian academic staff member of University of Ghana (the oldest university in Ghana). The first black African Rhodes Scholar, Lebrecht Wilhem Fifi Hesse, was educated at the school.

Kwadzo Senanu was pro vice-chancellor and later acting vice-chancellor of University of Ghana; and Reginald Ansa-Asamoah was pro vice-chancellor of Kwame Nkrumah University of Science and Technology. Daniel Wubah is the first African president of Millersville University of Pennsylvania.

Scholars educated include plant pathologist Edwin Asomaning FGA, surgeon Emmanuel Archampong FGA, soil scientist David Acquaye FGA, jurist Fred Apaloo FGA, jurist V.C.R.A.C. Crabbe FGA, mycologist George Odamtten FGA, economist Peter Quartey FGA, historian Robert Addo-Fening, microbiologist Michael McClelland, mathematician Abdul–Aziz Yakubu, physician Rexford Ahima, and geneticist James Adjaye.

=== Medicine ===
In medicine, alumni include the first Ghanaian neurosurgeon, J. F. O. Mustaffah; the first Ghanaian eye specialist, Cornelius Odarquaye Quarcoopome; and Jacob Amekor Blukoo-Allotey, who is known for his pioneering role in the study of pharmacology in Ghana. Cornelius Odarquaye Quarcoopome and Jacob Plange-Rhule were both once presidents of the Ghana Medical Association. Emmanuel Quaye Archampong was president of the West African College of Surgeons, and Joseph Kpakpo Acquaye was president of the West African College of Physicians.

=== Arts ===
In the arts, Jerry Hansen founded and became the first president of the Musicians Union of Ghana (MUSIGA). Veteran music producer Zapp Mallet coined the term “hip life," and KiDi is the 2022 VGMA artist of the year. Actor Chris Attoh and writer Amu Djoleto also attended the school.

Others in the fine arts include visual artists; Prince Gyasi, Bright Tetteh Ackwerh, and Ray Styles, and sculptors; Eric Adjetey Anang and Constance Swaniker. One of Ghana's top entertainment channel 4stye TV happens to have its CEO and founder in the name of Ignace Hego as an old boy of the school.

=== Business ===
Nana Awuah Darko Ampem I founded Ghana's first private indigenous insurance company; Vanguard Assurance, and was a founding director of CalBank. E. N. Omaboe (also Nana Wereko Ampem II) and John Kobina Richardson served on a committee to initiate the Ghana Stock Exchange. T. E. Anin & Archibald Tannor have been managing directors of GCB Bank. Tei Mante was vice-chairman of Ecobank Transnational Incorporated. Godfrey Gaoseb was an executive director of the World Bank. Felix E. Addo was country senior partner of PwC, and Felix Nyarko-Pong was CEO of uniBank.

As at 2024, old boys who were serving as CEOs of banks include Daniel Addo of CBG, Julian Opuni of Fidelity Bank, Bernard Gyebi of Prudential Bank, who also happens to be the current CEO and Managing director of UBA as at 2026 and Edward Botchway of Absa Bank Ghana. Mr.Kojo Addae-Mensah is also serving as Databank group's CEO with full capacity. The 2025 and 2026 calendar years were climaxed with Philip Tieku and John Osei-wusu as CEOs and founders of some major power players in the Oil and gas industry namely Star Oil Ghana and JP Oil Ghana. The hospitality industry also has its own share of our gallant men with Mr David Eduaful serving as the head and managing director of Labadi beach hotel and the director of Hotel invesntments(Ghana) Ltd.

=== Journalism ===
In the media, Joe Lartey considered one of Africa's greatest football commentators, studied at the school. Eric Heymann was Editor of the Evening News and Goodwin Tutum Anim was the first African to head the Ghana News Agency; Earl Ankrah is known to have pioneered breakfast shows in Ghana; Ben Ephson is founder and chief editor of the Daily Dispatch; and Nathan Adisi (Bola Ray) is CEO of EIB Network Group. Others are African Journalist of the Year Award winner Israel Laryea; Randy Abbey of Good Morning Ghana; Akwasi Sarpong of BBC's Focus on Africa, Bright Nana Amfoh, Seniors News Editor at Metro TV; Francis Abban, current affairs presenter at GHOne TV and Alfred Akrofi Ocansey, current affairs programme host at TV 3.

=== Sports ===
In sports, old boys include Ohene Djan, Ghana's iconic sports administrator and first chairman of the Ghana Football Association, and his successor; H. P. Nyemitei. Asamoah Gyan, the Black Stars' former captain and all-time top scorer, and his teaammate Lee Addy attended the school. Prosper Harrison Addo is currently General Secretary of the Ghana Football Association. Daniel Nii Laryea is the highest Ghanaian ranked football match official by CAF rankings.

In athletics, Allotei Konuah managed Ghana's first appearances at both the Olympics and Commonwealth games; and N. A. Adjin-Tettey is a pioneer national athletics coach. John Myles-Mills and brother Leo Myles-Mills each competed on the track at two Olympic events.

In boxing, Alhassan Brimah competed in the sport at the Olympics and was the 1962 African Middleweight champion.

== Ties ==
=== ACASMA (Accra Academy and St. Mary's Alliance) ===
ACASMA is the joint association of the old boys and girls of Accra Academy and the St. Mary's Senior Secondary School, now St. Mary's Senior High School.

There was a nationwide teachers strike in the 1970s and some Accra Academy students who were capable of learning the school curricula on their own offered lessons free of charge to their colleagues in Accra Academy and St. Mary's Senior Secondary School. The goodwill demonstrated by these students from the Accra Academy won the admiration of staff and students of the St. Mary's Senior Secondary School and resulted in the formation of the alliance to foster stronger ties between both secondary educational institutions.

=== Lodge Accra Academy ===
The Accra Academy Lodge is a Masonic lodge managed by alumni who are Freemasons in the Grand Lodge of Ghana or the Grand Lodge of Scotland. The lodge is not part of the school's administration and as such has its own management and premises. Membership in the lodge is open only to alumni. Members occasionally support the school with financial assistance.

Chartered by	Status of Lodge Accra Academy	Lodge number	Date of foundation
Grand Lodge of Ghana	Provincial Grand Lodge	63.	
Grand Lodge of Scotland	District Grand Lodge of Ghana	1699.	7 August 1975

== See also ==
- Education in Ghana
- List of senior secondary schools in Ghana
- In the News
  - Accra Academy 1980 Old Students Rehabilitate School's North Gate. Retrieved from modernghana.com.
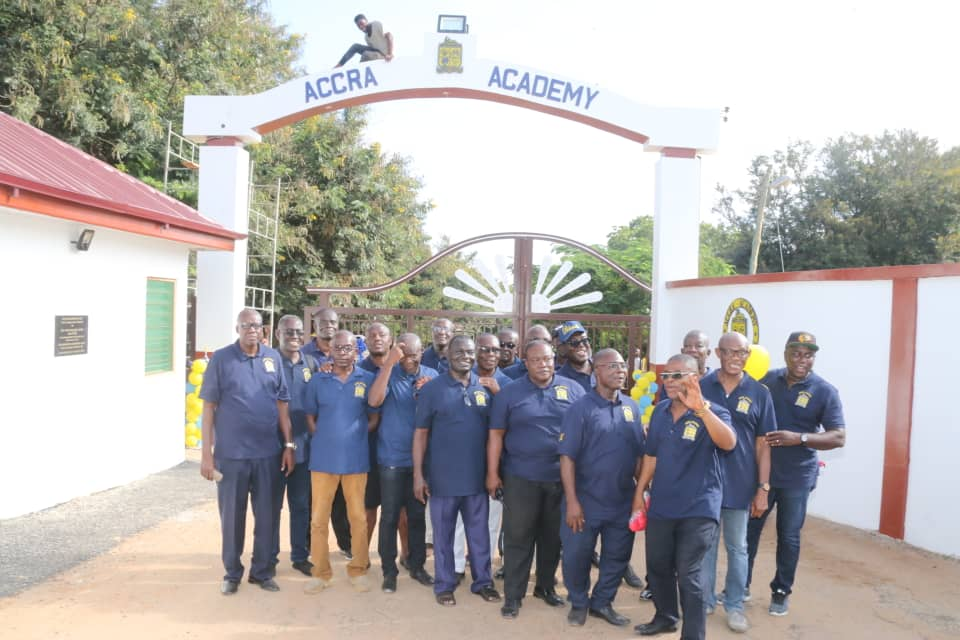
  - Bleoo '80 opens new north gate.
