= Gilbert Boafo Boahene =

Ghanaian civil servant and Supreme Military Council Secretary

Secretary to the Supreme Military Council & Head of the Civil Service
- In office 1979–1979
- President: F.W.K. Akuffo
- Preceded by: E.K. Minta

Deputy Secretary to the Supreme Military Council
- In office 9 December 1976 – 1979

Principal Secretary to the Ministry of Defense
- In office 1974–1976
- President: I. Kutu Acheampong
- Minister: I. Kutu Acheampong

Greater Accra Regional Administrative Officer
- In office 1972–1974
- President: I. Kutu Acheampong

Secretary to the Public Services Commission
- In office 1963–1967
- President: Kwame Nkrumah; J.A. Ankrah
- In office 1969–1972
- Prime Minister: Kofi Busia

Principal Secretary, Higher Education Division, Ministry of Education
- In office 1967–1968

Personal details
- Born: Gilbert Boafo Boahene; 18 December 1924 Amanokrom, Gold Coast
- Died: November 2016 (aged 91)
- Education: Accra Academy
- Alma mater: University College of the Gold Coast
- Occupation: public servant
- Known for: Secretary to the Supreme Military Council Cabinet

Gilbert Boafo Boahene (18 December 1924 – November 2016) was a Ghanaian civil servant who was Secretary to the Supreme Military Council, and also was Secretary to the Public Services Commission on two occasions; first in the First Republic and then in the Second Republic. He was the cabinet secretary of the S.M.C. government in Ghana at the time of its overthrow in the 1979 June 4th revolution.

== Early life and education ==
Gilbert Boahene was born on 18 December 1924 in Amanokrom. He started his primary education at Amanokrom Presbyterian Junior School and continued at Akropong Presbyterian Middle School popularly known as the Akropong Salem. Boahene had his secondary education at the Accra Academy from 1941 to 1946. He studied at the University College of the Gold Coast for a B. A. in History degree from 1949 to 1954. Boahene began studies at the Ghana School of Law in 1994. He was called to the Ghanaian bar in 1998 at the age of 74.

== Career ==
Boahene entered the administrative service as an Assistant Government Agent to the Kete-Krachi (Buem-Krachi) district in 1954, and was transferred to Keta in 1955. In 1955, he was put on appointment as Secretary to the Regional Officer in Ho and became the most ranking Gold Coast citizen in Trans-Volta Togoland. He performed the duties of persuading people in the Buem-Krachi, Kpandu and Ho districts of British Togoland to be integrated into Ghana at the 1956 British Togoland status plebiscite, together with his administrative colleagues. After which, in 1956, he became government agent to Jasikan and was sent again to Kete-Krachi in the same role after Ghana's Independence.

After this period, he was attached to the High Commission of Ghana, London, and served as assistant director of Recruitment (Overseas) in the Ghana Civil Service.

In 1963, he returned to the Establishment Secretariat in Ghana and was moved to the Ministry of Education as Principal Assistant Secretary. That same year in 1963, Boahene was posted on appointment as Secretary to the Public Services Commission chaired by K.G. Konuah, his former school principal. In 1967, he returned to the Higher Education Division of the Ministry of Education. He became principal secretary of the division in June 1968. He served on various committees and boards. Some of which are the councils of all three institutions of higher learning in Ghana which were; University of Ghana, Kwame Nkrumah University of Science and Technology and University of Cape Coast.

In 1970 he was re-appointed Secretary to the Public Services Commission, and in 1972 sent to the Greater Accra Regional Office as Regional Administrative Officer. In 1974 Boahene was appointed Principal Secretary at the Ministry of Defense whose ministerial oversight was retained by the military head of state, General Ignatius Acheampong. In 1976 he was promoted to the grade of Senior Principal Secretary. That same year in July 1976, he was posted to the seat of government as Deputy Secretary to the Supreme Military Council in direct succession to the Secretary. He was subsequently made Secretary of the Supreme Military Council cabinet, a position he briefly held prior to the June 1979 revolutionary coup d'état that overthrew the Supreme Military Council government. He retired from the Civil Service in October 1979, prior to the coming into office of the Limann civilian administration. In 1979, Boahene was appointed a director on the board of directors at the Ghana Italy Petroleum company (GHAIP) now Tema Oil Refinery.

In October 1998 he went into private law at Oboyang Chambers.

== Personal life ==
He married Christine Joyce Ayisi in 1958. Together, they had 3 children. He was the father-in-law of Okyehene Amoatia Ofori-Panyin II, Paramount chief of Akyem Abuakwa. He died in November 2016.
