= Henry Plange Nyemitei =

Ghanaian football administrator

President of Ghana Football Association
- In office 1968–1971
- Preceded by: Nana Fredua Mensah
- Succeeded by: Henry Djaba
- In office 1966–1967
- Preceded by: Ohene Djan
- Succeeded by: Nana Fredua Mensah

Personal details
- Born: Henry Plange Nyemitei; 3 April 1919 Accra, Ghana
- Education: Accra Academy
- Occupation: football administrator, insurance executive

Henry Plange Nyemitei (1919 - 1993) was a Ghanaian insurance executive and football administrator. As president and chairman of Accra Hearts of Oak Football Club, he headed the club for over four decades. During his stewardship, Hearts of Oak competed in the first edition of the Ghana Premier League in 1956 and became the first football club in Ghana to be elevated from amateur status to professional status in 1980. Nyemitei was chairman of the Ghana Football Association from 1966 to 1967 and 1968 to 1971. He was a founding member and deputy managing director of SIC Insurance Company.

He also held the roles of: Chief Patron of Sports Writers Association of Ghana (SWAG); Chairman of Accra Hearts of Oak Agency; Deputy Managing Director of SIC Due to his commitment to the sport, the SIC Nyemitei-SWAG Cup was created in honor of the 20th anniversary of the death. He was described as "the grey-haired 'Soccer Philosopher'" in 2015 by SWAG, which was sponsored by the SIC Insurance Company where he worked.

== Early life and political career ==
Nyemitei was born on 3 April 1919 at Christianborg in Accra. He was educated at the Accra Academy.

His early career begun as a staff of the Meteorological Department in Accra. At the department, he worked as a meteorological observer from 1941 to 1949. He also served as first president of the Meteorological Workers Union. Nyemitei led the Meteorological Workers Union to launch a strike in the Gold Coast. On 6 January 1950, the strike was joined by the Trade Union Congress (TUC) which declared a general strike and which supported by Kwame Nkrumah became the Positive Action campaign.

Nyemitei was secretary of the Youth Study Group from 1948 to 1949. He was the assistant general secretary of the Convention People's Party in 1949. He served as the acting general secretary of the Convention People's Party from 1950 to 1952, during which the first general election in the Gold Coast took place. In April 1952, he and party journalist, Saki Scheck, were expelled from the eight-member central committee of the Convention People's Party. On 4 May 1952, together with some expelled and dissatisfied former CPP members including J. Kwesi Lamptey, Saki Scheck, Ashie Nikoi and Dzenkle Dzewu, Nyemitei gave support to Kofi Abrefa Busia and J.B. Danquah in the formation of the Ghana Congress Party.

== Insurance career ==
In 1955, Nyemitei involved himself in the preparatory work for the establishment of the Gold Coast Insurance Company. He became agency director of the privately held company. In 1957, he was promoted as general manager and the company became known as the Ghana Insurance Company.

In November 1962, he became general manager of the State Insurance Corporation, when the Ghanaian government incorporated the Ghana Insurance Company to start the State Insurance Corporation.

== Accra Hearts of Oak ==
In 1956, as president of Accra Hearts of Oak S.C., he led the club to take part in the first ever Ghana Premier League.

In September 1974, as chairman of the board of directors of the club, he announced the formation of a caretaker committee to manage the club at the end of the George Osekre administration of the club.

In 1976, on the appointment of Tommy Thompson as executive chairman of the club, Nyemitei served as president of the board of trustees, whose members served as directors of the club.

== Personal life ==
His hobbies were football and athletics.
