= A. K. Konuah =

Ghanaian educationist

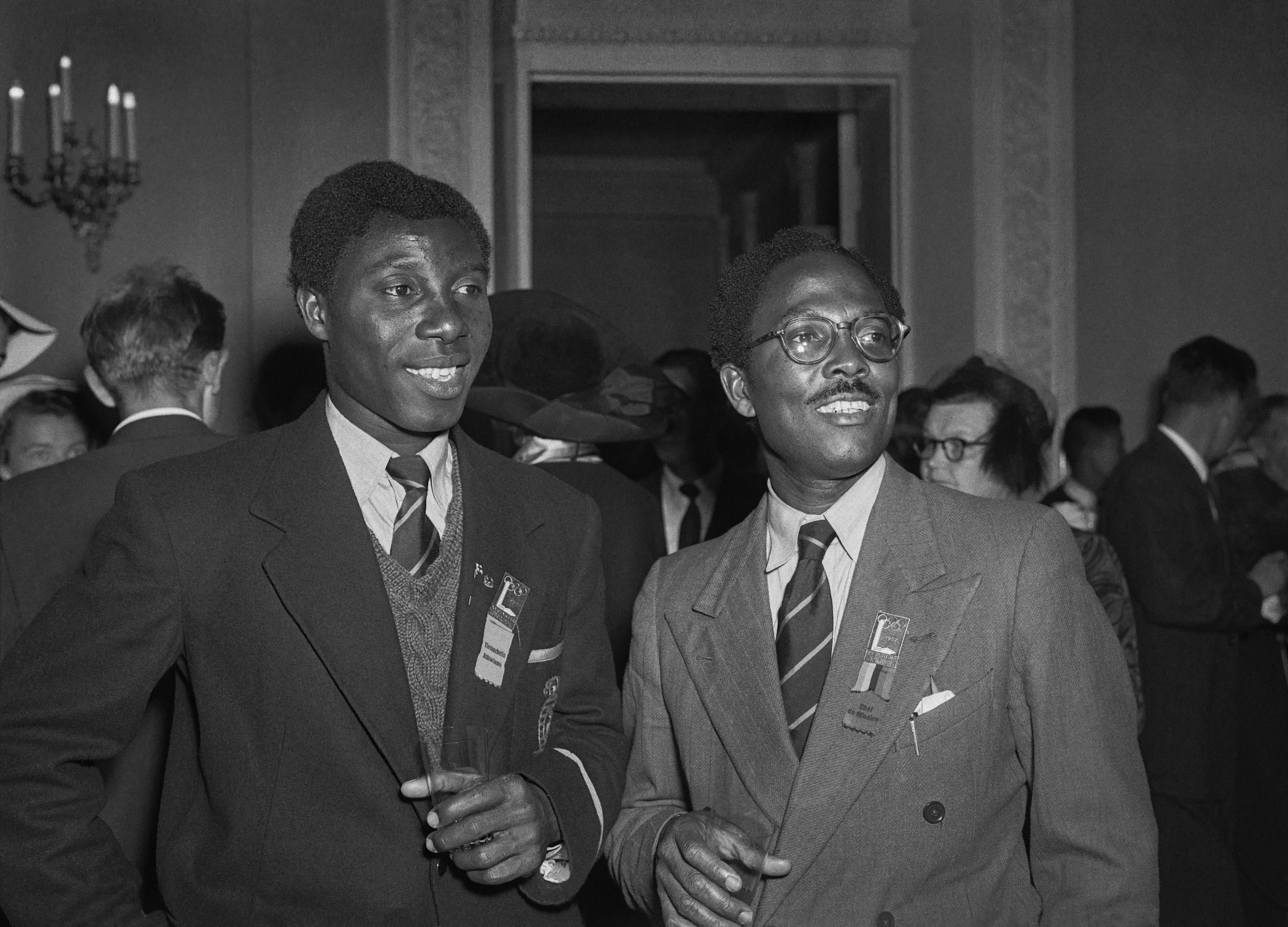
- A. K. Konuah (in glasses) and George Acquaah at 1952 Helsinki Olympics

Executive Chairman of the Accra City Council
- In office February 1979 – October 1979
- Preceded by: Major J.S.K. Okai

Personal details
- Born: Allotei Kobina Konuah; 1915 Gold Coast
- Died: 9 October 1979 (aged 63–64)
- Spouse: Rosina Konuah (m. 1950)
- Education: Accra Academy; Achimota College; University of London
- Occupation: Educationist; sports manager; city administrator

Allotei Kobina Konuah (1915 - 1979) was a Ghanaian city administrator, educationist, and sports manager. He was executive chairman of Accra City Council from February 1979 until his death in October 1979. Before this, he was headmaster of Accra Academy from 1953 to 1967. He was team manager for Ghana at the 1952 Summer Olympics and the 1954 Commonwealth Games, which marked the first appearances at both competitions for Ghana and the only appearances as a British colony.

== Early life ==
Allotei Kobina Konuah was born in Accra in 1915 to Alexander Konuah and Yaba Aye, both were natives of the Gold Coast. He was a younger half brother to the statesman Kofi Konuah.

In January 1929, Konuah was enrolled in Achimota School as a pioneer student of the secondary school department. In June 1931, he was enrolled in the Accra Academy as one of nineteen foundation students of the school. He became the first head prefect of the school the following year. He passed the Senior Cambridge School Certificate in 1933 and went on to teach in the school. He studied at Achimota College from May 1936 to July 1938 for his Inter B.A. degree. Through correspondence with Wolsey Hall, Oxford, he received a B. A. degree from the University of London in 1943. Konuah had further education at Rutgers University in the United States in 1957.

== Career ==
In 1934, he became a member of the teaching staff of the Accra Academy. Two year after this, he underwent a study-leave and returned to the teaching staff in 1938. In addition to his teaching duties, he served as sports master and, in 1947, he was instrumental in the admission of the Accra Academy to the fold of Aggrey Shield competing schools. He trained the school's athletes who won the Aggrey Shield in 1950 and 1951.

On 31 December 1952, K. G. Konuah retired from heading the Accra Academy and handed over to A. K. Konuah as his successor. In 1959, Konuah became a founding member of the National Symphony Orchestra. He also received Gold Coast Governor-General Lord Listowell on his visit to the Accra Academy as headmaster. Konuah also served on the Ghana Museum and Monuments Board. He was a member of the board of the Central Organization of Sports which replaced the Ghana Amateur Sports Council in 1961, as the governing sports body. Konuah was chairman of the Schools and Colleges Sports Federation. The federation organized the first ever national collegiate and schools sports competition in 1962.

In July 1961, Allotei Konuah oversaw the relocation of Accra Academy from Ankrah lane in Jamestown to its present location off the Winneba road in Bubiashie. Konuah served as vice chairman of Conference of Heads of Day and Encouraged Secondary Schools (now CHASS), and as a council member of the University of Science and Technology in Kumasi. In 1966, he supervised works for the opening of two new boarding houses at the new site in Bubiashie. In September 1967, Konuah resigned as headmaster of the Accra Academy. In October 1967, he took up an appointment as public relations officer of the West African Examination Council.

In 1966, Konuah was a member of a four-man goodwill mission to France sent by the National Liberation Council, after it took power in a coup d'etat, which was led by Christian Baëta. The two other members were E. P. K. Seddoh, then Supervising Principal Secretary of the Ministry of External Affairs and P. K. K. Quaidoo a former government minister. In 1967, Konuah was appointed a member of the NLC's Tibo Committee that studied the Central Organization of Sports. Konuah chaired the Central Advisory Committee on Youth of the National Liberation Council.

In 1970, Konuah was appointed chairman of an education review committee set up by Prime Minister Kofi Busia. The committee proposed in its 1971 report that the O-level and A-level educational system modelled after the British educational system be replaced by a Junior Secondary School and Senior Secondary School educational system respectively.

He was a director of the Ghana Commercial Bank under the chairmanship of T. E. Anin.

In February 1979, Konuah was appointed to head the Accra City Council as executive chairman. He replaced the military officer in charge of the council.

== Sports ==
In 1944, Konuah was chosen as assistant secretary of the Gold Coast Amateur Athletic Association at its founding. In 1955, as secretary, Konuah's name was gazetted as representative of the Amateur Athletics Association to the Gold Coast Amateur Sports Council. In April 1957, he was re-elected Secretary of the Gold Coast Amateur Athletics Association, staying as representative of the Athletics Association on the Gold Coast Amateur Sports Council.

In 1950, he was the founding vice-president of the Gold Coast Hockey Association. In June 1951, he became its second president occasioned by the transfer of the founding president Emmanuel Evans-Anfom away from Accra, one of the urban centers of the game, for medical practice in rural Dunkwa. He was president of the Gold Coast Hockey Association until 1957 when he handed back to Evans-Anfom.

Konuah was manager for the 1952 Gold Coast Olympic team of athletes which made a maiden participation for the Gold Coast at the 15th edition of the event in Helsinki. Konuah said in interviews that the people of the host nation Denmark were friendly to the Ghana team. In August 1952, at a dinner party in Helsinki, Konuah was introduced to the Duke of Edinburgh. In September 1952, the team of eight athletes and two managers, returned to the Gold Coast.

In 1954, Konuah was team manager for Ghana at the 1954 Commonwealth Games in Vancouver, Canada. This was the first participation of the Gold Coast, now Ghana, in the Commonwealth Games.

== Personal life ==
Konuah was married twice. His first marriage was to Adawa Crabbe with whom he had a son William Wallace Bruce-Konuah. Adawa died a year after giving birth to William. He married Rosina Konuah (née Vanderpuye) who was a pharmacist, a social worker and a registered nurse, for his second marriage in 1950. Konuah's second wife, Rosina, lived to be over 100 years old. She celebrated her 101st birthday in 2023 and was recognised as one of Vodafone Ghana's oldest customers. She died in 2023 at the age of 101.

He was a freemason and a founding member of both Achimota Lodge and Lodge Accra Academy. These were lodges founded by alumni of Achimota School and Accra Academy. He was the first Primus of Lodge Accra Academy.

== Death ==
Konuah died on 9 October 1979. He was 64 years and was serving as executive chairman of the Accra City Council. He was buried in November 1979.
