= Ben Ephson =

Ghanaian journalist

- Born: Benjamin Emmanuel Ephson Jnr; 17 October 1957 (age 69); Accra
- Education: Accra Academy; University of Ghana; University of Maryland
- Occupation: Journalist
- Notable credits: Africa Magazine; West Africa; Daily Dispatch
- Website: www.benephson.com

Benjamin Emmanuel Ephson (born 1957) is a Ghanaian journalist and pollster. Ephson is the Managing Editor of the Daily Dispatch newspaper.

== Early life and education ==
Ben Ephson was born in Accra in 1957. He had his secondary education at the Accra Academy and obtained his law degree, LL.B (Hons) from the University of Ghana, Legon in 1981. He won a Ford Foundation Fellowship to study US Foreign Policy at the University of Maryland, College Park. His research paper was entitled 'The Impact of the Print Media on U.S. Foreign Policy Somalia as a case study'.

== Career ==
Ben begun his professional career in journalism in 1974, whilst still a student at the Accra Academy. He started reporting for the London-based monthly Africa Magazine. His reports on torture and other forms of human right abuse for the Africa Magazine did not go unnoticed by the then military government in power at the time, the National Redemption Council. Aside the possibility of his arrest, the concern of school authorities realising he was leaving the boarding house without permission to attend press conferences and conduct interviews was another threat he faced. His imminent arrest occurred while a student at the Accra Academy as he recalled how surprised they were to find out the Ben Ephson they expected to see was a teenage school boy rather than a grown man. He spent five months in cell without any visitors. Ben continued to pursue journalism even after receiving his law degree from the University of Ghana in 1981, the year the Limann government was overthrown by the Armed Forces Revolutionary Council (AFRC). Around the period, he was reporting for the weekly West Africa (magazine). He was arrested once again, this time by the AFRC which had then evolved into Provisional National Defence Council (PNDC). At the time of his arrest, his wife was 8-months pregnant and he was released about 4 months after his son was born. He worked with the Africa Magazine from 1974 to 1984 and worked for the West Africa (magazine) from 1982 to 1996. He was the Ghanaian Correspondent for the British Broadcasting Corporation (BBC) between 1986 and 1996 and the Ghanaian Correspondent for the Agence France-Presse (AFP) from 1996 to 2006. He also hosted Ephson's File, a live radio talk show, on Radio Gold in the mid 1990s. He is currently the managing editor of the Daily Dispatch.

Ben is widely regarded as a credible pollster in Ghana. He has credited his polling abilities to the principles of the U.S. election research opinion polling which he had the opportunity to learn while studying at the University of Maryland. Many of his predictions with regards to the presidential elections have been correct or close and for this reason he is a sought after pollster in the country. However, prior to the 2016 general election which resulted in a victory for the National Patriotic Party (NPP) he predicted John Mahama's National Democratic Congress (NDC) to poll 52.4 percent of the votes and Nana Akufo-Addo's National Patriotic Party (NPP) to poll 45.9 percent of the votes.

== Awards ==
- Award for 'Human Rights and Excellence' from the US-based National Association of Black Journalists (NABJ).
- Award for 'Commitment and Dedication' from the Ghana Journalists Association (GJA).

== See also ==
- 2016 Ghanaian general election
