= John Kofi Fynn =

Ghanaian academic and politician (1935–2005)

Member of the Ghana Parliament for Abura
- In office 1969–1972
- Preceded by: Military government
- Succeeded by: Parliament dissolved

Personal details
- Born: 21 September 1935
- Died: 25 August 2005
- Citizenship: Ghana
- Education: University of Ghana; School of Oriental and African Studies
- Occupation: Lecturer

John Kofi Fynn was a Ghanaian academic and politician. He was an emeritus professor of history at the University of Ghana and a deputy minister of state in the Busia government. He served as deputy minister for local government and administration and later deputy minister for education.

== Early life and education ==
Fynn was born on 21 September 1935 to Opanyin Kofi Fynn (his father) of Fomena near Anomabo and Madam Abena Abam Tsiboe (his mother) at Abura-Dunkwa a town in the Central region of Ghana. He is a member of the Royal Kona family.

He had his secondary education at Mfantsipim School from 1951 to 1956. He enrolled in the University of Ghana in 1957 graduating with his bachelor's degree in 1961. In 1964 he was awarded his doctorate degree (PhD) at the School of Oriental and African Studies.

== Career and politics ==
After completing his post graduate studies in 1964 he took up lectureship at the History Department of the University of Ghana. He worked as a lecturer of history from 1964 to 1969 while working as a part-time lecturer of history at the Institute of Adult Education and the Institute of African Studies from 1965 to 1969. He served as the tutor of the Commonwealth hall (a resident hall of the University of Ghana) from 1965 to 1968.

He ventured politics in 1969 and was elected a member of parliament for the Abura constituency on the ticket of the Progress Party. He contested the seat with Isaac Kurankyi-Nkrumah of the National Alliance of Liberals, Dr. E. V. C. De-Graft Johnson of the All People's Republican Party and Paul Begyina of the United Nationalist Party. That same year he was appointed deputy minister for local government and administration serving in this position together with Justice Akuamoa Boateng. He served in this capacity until 1971 when he was moved to the ministry of Education, Culture and Sports in the January 1971 reschuffel. He served in the ministry until 13 January 1972 when the Busia government was overthrown.

He was recalled to the history department of the University of Ghana working as an associate professor at the Institute of African Studies. He served as dean of the faculty of social sciences from 1982 to 1984 doubling as head of the university's history department in the same period. He was head of the department of history for the University of Liberia from 1984 to 1986. In December 1989, he was promoted to full professorship status. He served on various university boards and committees and was once secretary of the Ghana National Committee of the Encyclopedia Africana Project. He was the external examiner for history for universities in Ghana and the West African sub region. Some of these universities they include; the University of Cape Coast (1987 to 1990), the Kwame Nkrumah University of Science and Technology (1990 to 1992), Fourah Bay College (1984 to 1986). He also served as an external examiner for the West African Examinations Council from 1965 to 1969. He retired as a lecturer of the University of Ghana in 1995 however he continued teaching history at the university on contract basis.

== Royalty ==
In 1985 he was enstooled nifahene of the Abura traditional area of the Central Region of Ghana with the stool name; Nana Budukuma IV.

== Publications ==
John authored articles in many journals and also served on boards of countless journals. On the week when he defended his doctoral dissertation entitled: Asante and Its Neighbours, Circa 1700–1807, he was approached by Longman publishing company who wanted to publish the manuscript with the same title. His first publication however was Asante and Its Neighbours, Circa 1700–1807 published by Longman in 1964. His other publications include:

- A Junior History of Ghana, Longman (1975);
- History for Senior Secondary Schools (co-authored by Professor Addo-Fening), Evans Brothers Publishing Ltd, London (1991).

== Honours ==
John was a recipient of local and international honours. In 1970, he was made honorary citizen of Sioux City, Iowa. In 1982 he won the Ghana Book Development award. He was awarded a Senior Fulbright Research Award at the University of Wisconsin from 1992 to 1993.

== Personal life and death ==
He was married to Mrs. Theodora Fynn (née Amorin). Together they had seven children. He died on 25 August 2005.

== See also ==
- List of MPs elected in the 1969 Ghanaian parliamentary election
- Busia government
