= Peter Quartey =

Ghanaian development economist

Peter Quartey Professor
- Born: Peter Quartey
- Citizenship: Ghanaian
- Occupation: economist
- Title: Professor

Academic background
- Education: University of Ghana University of Warwick University of Manchester

Academic work
- Discipline: Economics
- Institutions: University of Ghana

Peter Quartey is a Ghanaian economist. He is a Professor of development economics and was the director of the Institute of Statistical, Social and Economic Research of the University of Ghana from 2019 to 2025. He is as at 2025 the acting director of the Legon Centre for International Affairs and Diplomacy (LECIAD) of the University of Ghana.

== Early life and education ==
Peter Quartey was born in Accra. He attended Wesley Grammar School and Accra Academy. Quartey received a B.A. and MPhil in economics from the University of Ghana in 1994 and 1996, respectively. Under an ODA Scholarship in 1996, Quartey moved to the University of Warwick to obtain a master's degree in Quantitative Development Economics. From 1998 to 2002, Quartey was enrolled at the University of Manchester for his doctorate degree in Development Economics.

== Career ==
In 2003, he returned to Ghana and joined the Institute of Economic Affairs and later the Institute of Statistical, Social and Economic Research (ISSER), University of Ghana in 2004 as a Research Fellow. He was promoted to Senior Research Fellow in 2008, to Associate Professor in May 2011 and Professor in January 2016. Peter Quartey was a professor at the Institute of Statistical, Social and Economic Research (ISSER), the head of the Department of Economics, and director of the Economic Policy Management Programme of the University of Ghana.

== Research ==
His research interests include private sector development, development finance, monetary economics, migration and remittances, and poverty analysis.
