= Robert Dodoo =

Ghanaian public servant

- Born: Robert Nii Djan Dodoo; 1934; Accra, Gold Coast
- Died: 20 December 2014 (aged 79–80); Korle-Bu
- Education: Accra Academy; University of Ghana
- Occupations: Public Servant, University lecturer
- Known for: Head of the Ghana Civil Service during first government of the 4th Republic
- Spouse: Grace Earlgina Dodoo
- Children: 5

Robert Nii Djan Dodoo (1934-2014) was a Ghanaian civil servant. He was Head of the Civil Service from 1994 to 2001 during Jerry Rawlings civilian rule. He had served previously as executive director of the Price and Incomes Board.

After Rawlings exit from the presidency, he was accused and faced trial for financial loss to the state. He made a return to government office as Chairperson of the Civil Service Council under the presidential administrations of John Atta-Mills and John Mahama, and was also a member of the National Development Planning Commission.

== Civil Service ==
Dodoo worked as executive director of the Prices and Incomes Board, a subverted organization in Accra prior to the Fourth Ghanaian Republic.

In 1994, Dodoo was appointed to be Head of the Civil Service. Since he was not a career civil servant, his appointment sparked controversy.

In 2001, the NPP administration of John Kufuor requested Dodoo to proceed on leave, and to hand over to K. Obeng Adofo who was chief director of the Office of the Head of Civil Service.

Dodoo was subsequently put on trial by the Kufuor administration for causing financial loss to state. The case gained a lot of media attention. Dodoo pleaded not guilty to the charges levelled against him in court. The judge who presided over the case was Justice Avril Lovelace-Johnson.
