= John Kobina Richardson =

Ghanaian industrialist

- Born: 1936
- Died: 2010 (aged 73–74)
- Education: Accra Academy; Kumasi College of Technology
- Alma mater: University of Ghana
- Occupations: businessman, Chairman of British American Tobacco Ghana

Dr.John Kobina Richardson (1936-2010) was a Ghanaian industrialist who was chairman and managing director of Pioneer Tobacco. Richardson was President of the Association of Ghana Industries from 1987 to 1993.

== Early life and education ==
Richardson was born in 1936. He had his secondary education at Accra Academy completing in 1955. He graduated from the Kumasi College of Technology and continued to the University of Ghana, from which he obtained a Bachelor of Science degree in Economics in 1962.

== Career ==
In the period immediately after his university education, Richardson joined the Pioneer Tobacco Company. Richardson rose in rank from a number of senior positions to become the company's managing director and later, combined the position of managing director and chairman. He was the first Ghanaian to take over the running of a large multinational corporation.

Richardson was a member of the advisory council of the Ghana Employers Association and the School of Administration of the University of Ghana. He was the First Vice President of the Association of Ghana Industries before becoming President of the Association from 1987 to 1993.

In 1989, Richardson helped set-up the Ghana Stock Exchange by serving on a ten-man national committee for its establishment.

Richardson was made Chairman of the University Council of the University of Ghana, Legon from 1991 to 1997, becoming the first alumni of the university to take up the role of chairman of the University Council.

Richardson served as chairman of Merchant Bank from 1990 to December 2002. He was Chairman of Leaseafric Ghana, an asset finance and leasing company.

In June 2002, Richardson was appointed as chairman of the Interim Management Committee for the Tema Oil Refinery. A year later, Richardson was named as chairman of the board of the Ghana Civil Aviation Authority.

== Honours ==
Richardson was amongst two main speakers for the first ever Public Service Commission of Ghana Annual lecture which was held in 1998.
