= Robert Addo-Fening =

Ghanaian historian

- Born: Robert Addo-Fening; 7 March 1935 (age 91); Osino, Gold Coast
- Occupation: Historian

Academic background
- Education: Accra Academy; Kumasi College of Technology
- Alma mater: University of Ghana; Australian National University

Academic work
- Institutions: University of Ghana

Robert Yaw Addo Fening (born 1935) is a Ghanaian historian who has made major contributions in documenting the history of Akyem Abuakwa and of Ghana. He has been accorded the award of Okyeman Kanea in recognition of his historical works. For several years he taught at the University of Ghana.

== Early life and education ==
Addo-Fening was born on 7 March 1935 at Osino in Akyem Abuakwa. He had his elementary education at Presbyterian schools in Osino and Akyem-Asafo from 1941 to 1949. He went on to Accra Academy on an Akyem Abuakwa State Scholarship for the Cambridge School Certificate obtained in 1953. He studied at the Kumase College of Technology on a Post-Secondary Teacher Training Course from 1954 to 1955. On qualifying, he was posted to be a teacher at Atibie near Mpraeso, Kwahu. In his second year at his teaching post, he enrolled with Wolsey Hall, Oxford for the General Certificate of Education (Advanced Level) received in 1957.

In October 1959, he entered the University of Ghana to read history. Addo-Fening's lecturers included Albert Adu Boahen. He graduated in June 1963 with a B. A. degree in Modern History. He taught History at Ofori Panin Secondary School, New Tafo from 1963 to 1965. Addo-Fening studied as a Commonwealth Scholar at the Australian National University in Canberra from 1965 to 1967 for his M.A. in History. He received his doctoral degree from the University of Ghana in 1980.

== Career ==
Addo-Fening joined the faculty of University of Ghana in 1967. His initial research interest and lectures did not focus on African history. He wrote on history aspects such as Indian philosophical thought as well as British involvement in India. Addo-Fening made a switch to writing about African history. He dealt with history pertaining to modern Ghana and in particular a section within it, the Akyem people and their traditional method of governance. He detailed the lives of its rulers especially Nana Sir Ofori Atta 1, King of Akyem Abuakwa and the development and politics found within the states of Akyem He rose through the ranks to be a professor of history at the University of Ghana in 1994 and head of the history department at the university the following year.

His book, Akyem Abuakwa, 1700-1943: From Ofori Panin to Sir Ofori-Atta 1 which was published in 1997 by the History Department of the Norwegian University of Science and Technology, was relaunched as part of the ceremony marking the 75th Anniversary of the death of Okyenhene, Ofori Atta I in 2018. The relaunch was performed by the President of the Ghana, Nana Addo Dankwa Akufo-Addo, in a ceremony chaired by the Okyenhene, Amoatia Ofori-Panin II.

Some of his publications and contributions include:

- Akyem Abuakwa and the Politics of the Inter-war period in Ghana, 1975
- The 'Akim' or 'Achim' in the 17th Century and 18th Century historical contexts, who were they?, Jan 1988.
- "Giving Akyem History its Due", The Journal of African History Vol 43 No.2 (2002) p. 324-326. published by the Cambridge University Press
- History for Senior Secondary Schools (co-authored by J.K. Fynn), Evans Brothers Publishing Ltd, London (1991).

He was a Fulbright Hays Scholar and researcher at the University of California at San Diego from 1977 to 1978 and a Fulbright Scholar-in-residence at the North Carolina A&T State University at Greensboro, North Carolina from 1992 to 1993.

== Other activities ==
In 1973 Addo-Fening became Okyeame (linguist) of the Royal Stool of Adadientem. In 1978, the Chief of Adadientem passed on and Addo-Fening no longer served in this position.

He was a member of the Economic Committee of the Akyem Abuakwa Development Society which was under the chairmanship of William Ofori-Atta.

Addo-Fening was chairman of the board of directors of Ghana Post during the presidential administration of John Kufuor from 2001 to 2008.

Addo-Fening has been Director of the Intra-National project on Chieftaincy, Governance and Development based in Accra.

== Honours ==
Addo-Fening has been made a Fellow of the Historical Society of Ghana and has served in the position of Honorary Secretary of the Society. He was also Editor of its main journal, Transactions.

== Works ==
- Akyem Abuakwa and the Politics of the Inter-war Period in Ghana (1975): ISBN 9783920707327
- Akyem Abuakwa, 1700-1943: From Ofori Panin to Sir Ofori Atta (1997): ISBN 8277650191
- Abrewa Nana: A Trajectory of Life : an Autobiography (2018): ISBN 9988285604
