= Prosper Harrison Addo =

Ghanaian football administrator

Prosper Harrison-Addo
- Born: Prosper Harrison-Addo
- Education: Accra Academy
- Alma mater: University of Ghana; Ghana School of Law; University of Salford
- Occupations: Lawyer; Sports administrator

Prosper Harrison Addo is a Ghanaian lawyer, journalist, and football administrator. He has been the General Secretary of the Ghana Football Association since 2020.

== Education ==
Addo had his secondary education at the Accra Academy before proceeding to the University of Ghana, where he studied Law and Economics for his undergraduate degree. Addo was a pioneering student volunteer for the then newly founded Radio Universe during his time at the university. He continued to the Ghana School of Law, where he was called to the bar in 2000. He obtained his master's degree in Business Administration from the University of Salford, Manchester.

== Career ==
As a football administrator, Addo has served the Ghana Football Association (GFA) in various capacities. He began as the Chairman of the association's Greater Accra regional Disciplinary Committee. He later became the chairman of the national Disciplinary Committee of the Ghana Football Association. He was a member of the FA Cup Committee and also member of the GFA Legal Committee.

Prior to his an appointment as General Secretary of the Ghana Football Association, Addo worked with MTN Ghana as Commercial Legal Manager, and Senior Manager of Compliance.

Addo is a member of the Sports Writers Association of Ghana (SWAG), and an associate member of the Institute of Public Relations.
