= Michael Dei-Anang =

Ghanaian civil servant and writer (1909–1977)

- Born: October 1909; Akwapim-Mampong, Gold Coast
- Died: 1977 (aged 67–68)
- Education: Mfantsipim School
- Occupations: Civil servant, writer, poet and novelist

Michael Francis Dei-Anang (October 1909 – 1977) was a Ghanaian civil servant, writer, poet and novelist.

== Early life and education ==
Dei-Anang was born in October 1909 at Akwapim-Mampong, Gold Coast (now Ghana). His ancestral roots in Akwapim-Mampong link him to the Akyepere Clan (Quarter). He was thus related to Nana John Kwame Ayew who was the Chief Cocoa Farmer on the Gold Coast and played a key role in making cocoa a global industrial crop. He had his secondary education at Mfantsipim School, where he graduated in 1930 as the head prefect of the 1930 batch of students. He then joined the Accra Academy in 1931 as a pioneer member of the teaching staff and taught there for a period of six months prior to entering Achimota College in 1932 for his intermediate bachelor's degree. He later went to the United Kingdom to study at the University of London.

== Career ==
After his tertiary education, Dei-Anang returned to the Gold Coast in 1939 and joined the Gold Coast civil service. Dei-Anang worked in various ministries. Following Ghana's independence, Dei-Anang was Secretary to the Governor-General of Ghana from 1957 to 1959 and permanent secretary to the Ministry of Foreign Affairs from 1959 to 1961. In 1961 he retired from the civil service and was appointed ambassador extraordinary and minister plenipotentiary and put in charge of the African Affairs Secretariat at the Office of the President. He was Kwame Nkrumah's foremost presidential advisor on African issues. In 1966, when the Nkrumah government was overthrown, Dei-Anang was imprisoned for two months. After his release, he moved to the United States of America where he taught at Brockport College.

His literary works focused on Ghanaian myths and traditions with particular focus on the Akan culture. Dei-Anang died in 1977.

== Works ==
- Wayward Lines from Africa (1946)
- Cocoa Comes to Mampong: Brief Dramatic Sketches Based on the Story of Cocoa in the Gold Coast, play (1949)
- Africa Speaks (1959)
- Okomfo Anokye's Golden Stool, play, (1959)
- Ghana Semitones (1962)
- Ghana Glory: Poems on Ghana and Ghanaian Life, poetry collection (1965)
