= Ray Styles =

Ghanaian artist

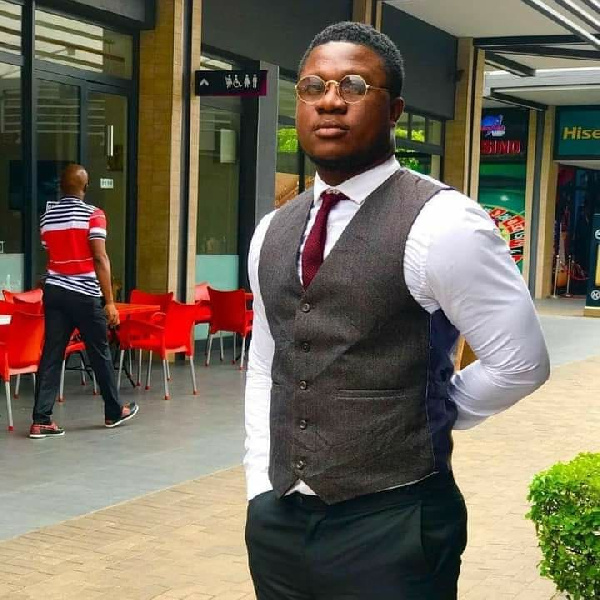
- Born: Emmanuel Apraku; 31 January 1988; Ghana
- Died: 1 October 2020 (aged 30–31); India
- Occupations: Draughtsman, keyboardist, footballer

Emmanuel Apraku (31 January 1988 – 1 October 2020), also known as Ray Styles, was a Ghanaian pencil artist,. He created his own brand in the form of pencil art, graphic design, and caricature. He worked with celebrities such as Tolu Lope, Josh Ostrovsky, Michael Blackson, Chris Bosh, DeStorm Power, Mrcocoyam, D Black, Edem, King Bach, and Malin Bjork, among others.

== Early life and education ==
He was born in 1988. He was the youngest among four children to Paul Apraku and his mother. His father died when he was 8 years old and he was raised by his mother. He had his basic education at the Accra New Town Experimental School. He later had his secondary education at the Accra Academy from 2003 to 2006. He further went to KNUST, Faculty of Art where he had his BA in Communication design.

== Career ==
His father was a craftsman who created a number of artworks for exhibition. Ray attributed his flair to his father. He began to draw at a young age and made commissions. He realized his talent when he was still a student of KNUST. He was the owner of Ray Styles Studios and dePenciled Celebrities.

== Death ==
Styles died on Thursday 1 October 2020, in India after battling with liver cancer for months. His death was confirmed by radio and television personality Giovani Caleb.

== Legacy ==
It is claimed he was known for participating in a number of social awareness campaigns through his art works. He made many paintings highlighting abuses in the society such as marital violence, child abuse, racism among others. He is also claimed to have painted artistic pictures and caricatures speaking about current celebrities and trends.
