= Julian Opuni =

Ghanaian banker

- Born: Julian Kingsley Opuni; 1972 (age 53–54); Accra, Ghana
- Education: Accra Academy
- Alma mater: University of Manchester Institute of Science and Technology
- Occupations: Businessman; banker
- Title: managing director of Fidelity Bank
- Spouse: Rebekah Opuni

Julian Kingsley Opuni is a Ghanaian banker who is the managing director of Ghanaian bank, Fidelity Bank since assuming the role in December 2018. He is the 3rd managing director of the bank, which is the largest privately owned bank and remains the 5th largest bank in Ghana in assets and deposits as at August 2026, and he took over from bank co-founder Jim Baiden.

== Early life and education ==
Opuni had his high school education at Accra Academy and is a member of the 1990 year batch of the school. After high school, he left Ghana to stay in the United Kingdom. He studied for a B.Sc. in Banking and Financial Services from the University of Manchester Institute of Science and Technology and became an associate of the Institute of Financial Services.

== Career ==
In 1994, Opuni joined Lloyds Bank in the United Kingdom on its expedited management trainee programme and gained work with the bank across several of its banking centers in the United Kingdom. His stay with the bank lasted 18 years and he ended up in the titled role of senior manager with responsibility for various business centers to the west of London.

In June 2012, Opuni returned to Ghana and joined Fidelity Bank as head of commercial banking unit. The unit was at its inception and in an interview that year with British news portal, The Guardian, Opuni, who doubted a career rise to the top at Lloyds, recounted been told by a director at Fidelity that "The thing about Ghana is, you could become CEO one day. Or you could start your own bank. Or you could become minister of finance".

In 2015, he was promoted to the senior management level as director of commercial & SME banking. In 2016, he was designated as divisional director of retail banking and spearheaded the popular Fidelity Save for Gold Promo which sought to reward customers of the bank with gold bars for deposits made with the bank. When Fidelity was adjudged in 2016 at the Ghana Banker Awards as Bank of the Year, the Save for Gold deposit promotion was one of two factors cited for the bank's customer growth in the story of The Daily Graphic. The next year, he run the Fidelity 10x Richer Promo to reward active customers and attract new customers for the bank.

In November 2017, Opuni was appointed as deputy chief executive of Fidelity from the role of divisional director of retail banking. However, the appointment was publicised in the news & media space in January 2018. He was accepted by the board of Fidelity as a replacement to the managing director and became managing director and CEO on 1 December 2018.

Opuni has advocated a continental strategy on technology for Africa which he has said will drive technology transfer and make an impact on the continent.

In 2019, he led the bank on a digital drive with emphasis on money transaction using the bank's mobile app and the opening up of the bank's 4th digital branch which offered bank customers an extension of banking hours up till 19 G.M.T. and personal usage of meeting rooms in the facility for their own deal-making. In 2020, Fidelity saw 80% of its total transactions happening through its various digital channels after migration and conversion of majority of the bank's customers onto digital platforms under Opuni's leadership.

There has been changes in the bank's shareholding structure under Opuni's management with need for capital inflow. In 2020, Opuni welcomed the acquisition of a minority stake in Fidelity by private equity firm AfricInvest. In 2021, under Opuni's watch, Leapfrog bought off Amethis and ERES stake in Fidelity gaining a 16.94% shareholding stake. In June 2022, Opuni negotiated a $50 million facility as working capital for the bank from the IFC.

In August 2022, Opuni, in an engagement with editors of media houses, announced the bank's intent of a launch of a social impact initiative, dubbed the Orange Impact by which the bank intends to give back to society. Opuni also disclosed the credit rating upgrade of Fidelity by rating agency, Global Credit Ratings which rated the bank A+ from a previous rating of A.

== Personal life ==
Opuni is married to Rebekah Opuni, a designer of wedding gowns in Accra.
