= Bright Tetteh Ackwerh =

Ghanaian satirical artist

Bright Ackwerh
- Born: Bright Tetteh Ackwerh; Accra, Ghana
- Known for: Visual Art, Painting
- Awards: Kunyehia Prize for Contemporary Ghanaian Art

Bright Tetteh Ackwerh is a Ghanaian satirical artist who employs the domains of popular art, street art, painting, and illustration to voice and document his persuasions. He has exhibited widely in Ghana and West Africa, building a niche as an emerging contemporary Ghanaian artist on the West African art scene.

== Early life ==
Born in Accra, Ghana, Bright attended Accra Academy and studied Visual Arts for his Senior High School education, before proceeding to Kwame Nkrumah University of Science and Technology (KNUST) to then study for BFA and MFA degrees in painting. He completed his first degree in 2011 and served as a teaching assistant the following year.

== Career ==
He began by exhibiting his artworks via social media and also painting on wall murals in the streets of Accra. He has featured in many art exhibitions in Ghana and abroad. Some these include: Art X Lagos Exhibition in Nigeria, blockbuster exhibitions by blaxTARLINES in Kumasi and the Chale Wote Street Art Festival in Accra.

In 2016, he won the Kuenyehia Prize for Contemporary Ghanaian Art at an event held at the Ringway Estates in Accra. Bright has through the years used social media in sharing his works and provoking powerful sentiments around the themes he explores in his illustrations and paintings.

He has also participated in group shows in Accra, Paris, Johannesburg and Los Angeles. In October 2017 he featured in the October edition of CNN African Voices. He was also on the Barclays L'Atelier Art Competition's 2017 list of top 10 artists.

== Style ==
His style is a satirical re-presentation of Ghanaian sociopolitical and religious issues in an incisive manner that provokes conversations, sparks debate and elicits response. He draws huge inspiration from Fela Kuti and other great African heroes as the subject of his works depict the unapologetic manner in relaying his messages.

He believes the music culture has a certain power to influence and inspire people and there's always the use of double and triples entendre that provide entry points into some of the discussions that the artwork generates.

== Awards ==
- In 2016 Bright Ackwerh won the Kuenyehia Prize for Contemporary Ghanaian Art award.
