= Tei Mante =

Ghanaian investment banker (born 1949)

- Born: July 22, 1949 (age 77); Accra, Ghana
- Education: Accra Academy
- Alma mater: University of Ghana, Columbia University
- Occupation: investment banker

Tei Mensa Mante (born July 22, 1949) is a Ghanaian investment banker who was formerly Vice Chairman at Ecobank Transnational. He served on the board of Ecobank Transnational from 2014 to 2020.

== Early life and education ==
Mante had his secondary education at Accra Academy from 1961 to 1968. He graduated with a BSc Administration from University of Ghana in 1971, and studied for an MBA in international finance at Columbia University in New York from 1973 to 1975.

== Career ==
In 1975, Mante was employed by the World Bank Group in Washington in the District of Columbia as a project manager. In 1983, he was seconded by the World Bank to the International Finance Corporation where after ten years; in 1993, he rose to occupy the management position of Director of the Sub-Saharan Africa Department. In 1997, he was moved to become the Director of the Agribusiness Department of the International Finance Corporation.

During his IFC career, he served on the boards of a number of equity funds and organisations which include the Africa Emerging Markets Fund, West Africa Growth Fund, African Management Services Company, and the Caribbean Financial Services Corporation. He left the World Bank Group in 2000.

In 2001, Mante became a special advisor to the economic management team of the Ghanaian government. He remained a special advisor to the government for the full length of the first-term presidential administration of John Kufuor in Ghana which ended in 2005.

Mante was chairman of the board of Ecobank Ghana from 2006 to 2010. His time as chairman, saw the introduction of a medium-term goal of shifting Ecobank Ghana from a predominant wholesale bank into a retail bank. In 2014, he was elected a non-executive director of the board of Ecobank Transnational as a representative of the bank's West African shareholders. On the board, he was selected as vice-chairman to Emmanuel Ikazoboh who was selected as chairman. Mante retired from the board in 2020.

Mante was an independent member of the investment committee of the equity fund, Pan-African Investment Partners from 2002 to 2010. Mante is currently a member of the investment committee of the West Africa Emerging Market Growth Fund.
