= Edward Quist-Arcton =

Ghanaian forester and civil servant

Edward Akufo Quist-Arcton
- Born: Edward Akufo Quist-Arcton; 19 September 1923; Accra, Gold Coast
- Education: Accra Academy; Achimota College; Brasenose College, Oxford
- Occupations: Civil Servant, forester
- Known for: First Chief Conservator of Forests

Edward Akufo Quist-Arcton was a Ghanaian forester and civil servant. He was the Chief Conservator of Forests from 1961 to 1962 and the Principal Secretary to the Ghanaian Ministry of Agriculture from 1962 to 1964. He was the first Ghanaian to be appointed Chief Conservator of Forests.

== Early life and education ==
Quist-Arcton was born on 19 September 1923 in Accra, Ghana (then Gold Coast). He was educated at Accra Academy where he was head boy for the 1942 batch of students, and thereafter attended Achimota College.

In 1948, Quist-Arcton became one of the earliest West Africans to enter the Commonwealth Forestry Institute of the University of Oxford. There, he was a member of Brasenose College, and an active student in sports, taking special interest in hockey, tennis, and golf. He also joined the Oxford University Senior Training Corps, enrolling in three summer camps. While at Oxford, Quist-Arcton was also a member of the West African Students' Club, a political group of which he served as its president in his third year. He graduated in 1952 with honours Moderations in the Natural Sciences, namely; Botany, Chemistry and Geology, and an honours degree in Forestry.

== Career ==
Quist-Arcton joined the Gold Coast Forest Service in 1946 as a probationer. Upon his return from his studies in the United Kingdom in 1952, he appointed Assistant Conservator of Forests. Working in this capacity, he gained experience in both the Savannah and High Forest areas as a District Forest Officer. At the Savannah areas, he was mostly involved in Reserve selection and demarcation, and also gained information on watershed management. In 1956, he became a Senior Assistant Conservator. As the Senior Assistant Conservator, he was responsible for the Forestry Training School for Rangers and also worked at District level for two years.

Following a requisite refresher course in 1958 at the Commonwealth Forestry Institute, Oxford, he was appointed S.A.C.F. Special Duties for a few months, tasked with the preparation of working plans. He later gained appointment as acting Conservator in February 1959, and substantive Conservator in July that same year. Working in that capacity, he was responsible for the Western and Central Circles and also responsible for working plans at the Headquarters, as well as serving as Headquarters Assistant. In July 1960, he was made Deputy Chief Conservator of Forest, and in January 1961, became Chief Conservator of Forest. Following his appointment, Quist-Arcton became the first graduate of African descent in a Commonwealth Territory, to be appointed Chief Conservator.

In February 1962, Quist-Arcton became Principal Secretary to the Ministry of Agriculture. This portfolio encompassed Agricultural Extension, Produce Inspection, Agricultural Education, Land Planning, the Volta River Scheme, Fisheries, Agricultural Resettlement and Farm Mechanisation, Agricultural Statistics, the Cocoa Division, and Statutory Bodies such as; Marketing Boards, and Co-operatives. He attended the United Nations or FAO conferences in Rome in 1959, Nigeria in 1960, New York in 1963, and Washington in 1963. He also established Land Reclamation and Irrigation Department of the Ministry of Agriculture, taking special interest in Forest Headwaters Reservation and Watershed Management.

Quist-Arcton served as the chairman of the Ghana Science Association from 1961 to 1962, and on the Governing Council of the Commonwealth Forestry Association for three years.

After exiting public service in Ghana, Quiet-Arcton gained employment at the Forestry division of the F. A. O. in Rome. After working two years in Rome, working in the Field Operations Unit attached to the Director's office, he was made Regional Officer for the Eastern Zone of Africa, stationed in Nairobi, Kenya. He oversaw F.A.O. forestry affairs in Botswana, Burundi, Ethiopia, Kenya, Lesotho, Madagascar, Malawi, Mauritius, Rwanda, Réunion, Swaziland, Tanzania, Uganda and Zambia.

== Personal life ==
Quist-Arcton was married with four children.
