= Francis Abban =

Ghanaian journalist

- Born: 22 March 1986 (age 40); Accra, Ghana
- Education: Ghana Institute of Journalism
- Occupation: journalist
- Spouse: Eunice Torto (m. 2016)

Francis Abban (born 22 March 1986) is a Ghanaian journalist with EIB Network's Starr FM and the host of The Morning Starr that runs every week day.

== Early life and education ==
Francis Abban was born on 22 March 1986 in Accra.

Abban attended Maria Montessori School at Kwadaso and the Ridge International School at Takoradi for his elementary education. He was educated at Accra Academy in Accra and studied at the Ghana Institute of Journalism.

== Career ==
Abban started his career at Skyy FM as a volunteer journalist. This was a period before and during his education at the Ghana Institute of Journalism.

In 2012 Abban went to work with Multimedia Group's Joy FM in Accra. His work with Multimedia Group spanned a period of five years. During this period, he worked briefly as co-host of Joy FM's flagship morning programme the Super Morning Show and was anchor for Joy Midday News and presenter for the news analysis programme The Pulse which aired on Joy News. From 2013 to 2017, he presented BBC Two Way, a partnership between Joy FM and the British Broadcasting Corporation to project major issues discussed during a week.

In 2017 Abban joined EIB's Network to work with EIB's network GHone Television as co-host of GHOne TV News Tonight. Soon after, he moved to EIB Network's Starr FM and replaced Nii Arday Clegg as the radio station's morning show host. In 2018 his appearance on the morning show of the radio station dubbed The Morning Starr earned him two nominations for the annual RTP Awards where he was nominated for the Radio morning show host of the Year and the Best Radio Personality of the Greater Accra Region.

== Personal life ==
In 2016 Abban married Eunice Torto.
