= Kofi George Konuah =

Ghanaian educationist and statesman

Kofi George Konuah CBE, GM

Chairman of Public Services Commission
- In office 1963–1970
- President: Kwame Nkrumah
- Preceded by: Sir Charles William Tachie-Menson

Chairman of Audit Service Board
- In office 1970–1974

Personal details
- Born: 19 August 1904 Kumasi, Ghana
- Died: 6 June 1996 (aged 91) Accra, Ghana
- Children: 9
- Education: Fourah Bay College; University of London
- Profession: Educationist and Public Servant
- Known for: Founding member of the Accra Academy

Dr. Kofi George Konuah CBE, GM (19 August 1904 – 6 June 1996) was a Ghanaian educationist and statesman who served as Chairman of the Public Services Commission of Ghana from 1962 to 1970 and Chairman of the Audit Service Board from 1970 to 1974. As an educationist, he is known for being a co-founder and the first principal of Accra Academy, an all-boys secondary school located in Accra.

== Early life ==
Kofi George Konuah was born on 19 August 1904 in Kumasi, Ashanti to parents of Ga-Adangbe ethnic origin. His father, Alexander Konuah, a Gold Coast civil servant, was an assistant treasurer in the colonial service. Paternally, Alexander belonged to the Bruce family of British Jamestown, and maternally to the Konuah family of Elmina. Due to a personal feud with his father’s family, Alexander adopted his mother’s surname as his surname passing it on to his children. K. G. Konuah’s mother, Elizabeth Quao, also known as Naa Densua II, was the Otublohum Manye (queenmother).

Konuah was educated at the Government Boys' Schools at Cape Coast and Accra from 1910 to 1919. He moved on to the Wesleyan Boys' High School in Freetown, Sierra Leonne. There, he was made headboy in his final year and completed in 1925. He continued at Fourah Bay College and was a student at the college during Kwegyir Aggrey's visit when the college had its centenary celebration. Aggrey impressed upon Konuah the idea of taking up teaching as a career. He graduated from Fourah Bay College in 1928, with a BA degree from Durham University. In 1946, he was awarded a British Council Bursary to study for a Diploma in Education at the University of London.

== Public life ==
Konuah first taught at Christ Church Grammar School before being employed as an African staff at Achimota School in 1930. After a few months of teaching at Achimota, Konuah was retrenched from the staff of the school. Soon after this he, with three others, decided to set up a school to cater for children who showed aptitude for learning but whose parents could not afford to send them to existing schools. They were James Akwei Halm-Addo, Konuah's friend at the Wesleyan Boys School and Gottfried Narku Alema and SamueI Neils Awuletey who were colleagues of his at Fourah Bay College. In July 1931, they founded the Accra Academy in a property given by Madam Ellen Buckle. All four men were aged under thirty years. Konuah served as the first Principal of the Accra Academy.

In 1948, he served as deputy to Nii Kwabena Bonne, then Osu Alata Mantse, on Nii Bonne's Anti-Inflation Campaign Committee, which was set up to demand a reduction in the prices of foreign goods in the country at the time.

In 1950, Konuah became a member of the Sir Leslie MacCarthy's Prisons Commission. In 1952, he served as a member of a Commission of Enquiry to study the health needs of the Gold Coast led by Sir John Maude. He was the only African member of the four-man commission.

On 31 December 1952, Konuah resigned his post as principal of Accra Academy to become the second African member of the Civil Service Commission (later to be known as Public Services Commission) by appointment in 1953. In 1954, Konuah became chairman of the board of governors of Accra Academy and held this role until 1967. In 1955, Konuah was a member of the International School Committee that saw to the establishment of Ghana International School, and later was chairman of the school's board.

On the death of Sir C. W. Tachie Menson (the first African member of the Civil Service Commission) in 1962, Konuah became chairman of the Civil Service Commission. In addition to this role, he served as chairman of the Governing Council of the Ghana Institute of Management and Public Administration from 1962 to 1969. He was also the first Chairman of the Ghana Mental Health Association. He served as the chairman of the Society of friends of Lepers.

On 18 March 1964, Konuah became a member of a three-member presidential commission inaugurated by Kwame Nkrumah to discharge presidential functions in Nkrumah's indisposal to act as president of Ghana due to absence or being incapacitated. The commission held office until 5 March 1965.

After the 1966 overthrow of the Convention People's Party, Konuah became a member of the Political Committee and the National Advisory Committee set-up by the National Liberation Council. He was sworn-in as chairman of the Audit Service Board on 8 July 1970 in front of the Presidential Commission of the Second Republic, and retired from public service in 1974.

== Personal life and family ==
Konuah was a lifelong congregant of the Anglican Church. He married Janet Buccholz and together, they had nine children. Notable among them was, William Godson Bruce-Konuah, a doctor and politician who served as a Minister in the Busia government.

== Honours ==
Konuah was made an Officer of the Order of the British Empire (O.B.E.) in 1956 and promoted to Commander (C.B.E.) in 1960.

In 1963, the University of Ghana presented him an honorary doctorate. He was amongst the first three persons awarded an honorary degree by the university. The two others were W.E.B. Du Bois and Sir Arku Korsah.

In 1968, the National Liberation Council awarded Konuah the Grand Medal (Civil Division) of the Republic of Ghana.

== Death and legacy ==
Konuah died on 6 June 1996 and is buried in the forecourt of the administration of Accra Academy. Konuah was principal of the Accra Academy for 21 years from 1931 to 1952 and held public office for another 21 years from 1953 to 1974. Konuah is remembered as one of the initiators of the first privately founded school in Gold Coast and the first founded without the initial help of any church group or denomination. The Konuah-Halm-Addo-Alema-Awuletey Lecture is held periodically in joint honour of him.
