= Fidelity Bank Ghana =

Bank in Ghana

Fidelity Bank
- Company type: Public
- Industry: Financial services
- Founded: 2006
- Headquarters: Accra,
- Number of locations: 82 branches
- Key people: James Reynolds Baiden (Chairman), Julian Opuni (Managing Director)
- Products: Loans, Transaction accounts, Savings, Investments, Debit cards, Mortgages
- Website: www.fidelitybank.com.gh

Fidelity Bank is a commercial bank in Ghana which begun business in October 1998 as a Discount House. It was issued with its Universal Banking License on June 28, 2006, making it the 22nd bank to be licensed by the Bank of Ghana. It is one of the twenty-seven licensed commercial banks in the country.

Fidelity Bank is headquartered in Accra, at Ridge Towers. As of January 2022, the bank operates 73 networked branches and 120 VISA enabled ATMs at various locations.

== Orange Impact Initiative ==
The Orange Impact Initiative, launched in 2022, is Fidelity Bank’s flagship educational CSR program focused on improving infrastructure and expanding access to quality learning for under-resourced schools across Ghana. As of September 18, the bank has built 11 schools.

== See also ==
- List of banks in Ghana
- Economy of Ghana
