= Ohene Djan =

Ghanaian sports administrator

- Born: 29 January 1924; Aburi
- Died: 26 March 1987 (aged 63); Nsawam, Eastern Region, Ghana
- Occupation: Sports administrator
- Known for: First president of the Ghana Football Association

Ohene Djan (29 January 1924 – 26 March 1987) was a Ghanaian sports administrator and politician. He was the First Director (Minister) of Sports of Ghana at the Central Organisation of Sports (COS) and was also vice-president of the Confederation of African Football.

== Early years and education ==
Ohene Djan was born on 29 January 1924 as one of the children of Mankrado Kwafo Kraba II and Aberewatia Juliana Yaa Amponsah Otoo alias Yaa Gyinae both from Aburi, Eastern Region.

His education begun at the Aburi Presbyterian Primary School and Aburi Methodist Boarding School. He later continued to the Accra Academy where he obtained his secondary education, completing in 1943.

== Early and ministerial career ==
After his secondary school education, he joined his father in his cocoa business. He worked with his father for a year and joined the civil service as a second division clerk. His father's deteriorating health forced him to resign in 1949 to manage his father's business.

In 1950, Djan became an active member of the CPP; the political party founded by Kwame Nkrumah, the Ghanaian government head from 1951 to 1966. In the 1951 general elections he stood on the ticket of the CPP and was elected as Member of the Legislative Assembly for the Akuapem-New Juaben beating Edward Akufo-Addo by 97 to 12 votes.

In parliament, Djan was appointed Ministerial Secretary (deputy minister) to the Ministry of Finance. He held that office until 1954 when he left Parliament due to corruption charges that were levelled against him.

== Sports ==
In September 1957, Djan was elected General Secretary of a new Ghana Amateur Football Association (GAFA). He had led a revolution that had toppled the administration of Richard Akwei, a respected councillor of Accra, who had ruled football in Ghana, then known as Gold Coast officially since 1952 and unofficially for some years before then.

Djan founded the Black Stars, Ghana's famous national team, and he strategically affiliated the Association with FIFA in 1958 and the CAF in 1960.

He was instrumental in securing sponsorship for the first Ghanaian FA Cup competition from a pharmaceutical firm, Merrs R.R. Harding and Company.

He succeeded in securing the services of an expatriate Coach, George Ainsley, for the National Team in that same year.

In 1958, he succeeded again in organizing the first national league, before Ghana became a republic on 1 July 1960.

In July 1960, Ghana's first President, Dr. Kwame Nkrumah, elevated Djan to the ministerial portfolio of 'Director of Sports', the overall boss of sports administration in Ghana. He was in charge of the newly created Central Organisation of Sports (COS) (now the Ministry of Youth and Sports (Ghana)), a sports ministry-like organization. Although Djan left his GAFA chairmanship post due to this promotion, he continued to play a key role as General Secretary.

Djan's reputation grew on the continent, his lobbying helped Ghana gain the hosting rights for the 1963 African Cup of Nations which the Black Stars won (the Black Stars went on to defend the trophy in Tunisia in 1965 under his tenure of leadership). He also suggested to Nkrumah to donate a trophy for a tournament that is now known as the CAF Champions League. At a CAF extraordinary assembly in Addis Ababa he became second in command of the continent's highest football administrative body, emerging as CAF vice president alongside Ethiopia's Ydnekatchew Tessema in January, 1963. They both served under Egyptian Abdel Aziz Moustafa, the CAF president. A year earlier, Djan had been voted unto the powerful FIFA Executive Committee (now known as the FIFA Executive Council). Sir Stanley Rous, FIFA's president then, described Djan as a 'valued' player at the World football governing body.

Aside football Ghana made giant strides in other sporting disciplines in his era as a Sports administrator. Ghana produced a silver medalist at the 1960 Summer Olympics in the name of Clement Quartey he became the first black African olympic medalist. Ghana was also the African country that won the most medals in the 1962 British Empire and Commonwealth Games.

Due to the influential role he played in Nkrumah's government, Djan was banned from public activities by the National Liberation Council, the military junta that undertook the coup of 1966, thus resulting in a loss of his place on the FIFA Executive Committee and subsequently, at CAF too.

With the spotlight dimmed, Djan's power and activeness declined, and he spent the ensuing years away from mainstream football politics.

== The 1966 FIFA World Cup boycott ==
In January 1964, FIFA decided that the 16-team finals would consist of 10 European teams, including hosts England, four South American teams, and one team from the Central American and Caribbean region, thus leaving only one place for three continents: Africa, Asia and Oceania.

Within a month, Djan, a member of the FIFA executive committee, sent a telegram to FIFA condemning the decision and calling it "pathetic", also challenging FIFA to reconsider the decision on the grounds that arranging a play-off between the best teams from Asia, Oceania and Africa for one place would be onerously expensive and fraught with logistical difficulties. Tessema then joined Djan to present Africa's case to FIFA, also arguing that the standard of football in Africa had significantly improved over the years.

However, after their efforts to change the qualifying format or the allocation of places proved futile, with FIFA citing competitive and logistical issues, all 15 African nations boycotted the qualifying in protest, leaving FIFA to organise the qualifying and the World Cup in Africa's absence.

Subsequently, North Korea defeated Australia, the only other team remaining, to qualify, and they put up an impressive performance in the tournament. Moreover, Portugal's Eusébio, who was actually born in Mozambique (a Portuguese colony at the time), finished as top scorer.

In 1968, FIFA unianimously decided that Africa would have one place for the next World Cup in Mexico. In 2026, African teams will compete for nine World Cup slots.

== Legacy ==
Ghana's national stadium the Accra Sports Stadium is named after him in recognition of his contribution to sports in the country.

== Death ==
Djan died aged 63 on 26 March 1987.

== See also ==
- BBC-Article with Image Ohene Djans , Retrieved on 8 November 2018.
