= Ghana Football Association =

Governing body of association football in Ghana

CAF
- Founded: 1935
- Headquarters: Accra
- FIFA affiliation: 1948 as Gold Coast
- CAF affiliation: 1960
- President: Kurt Okraku
- General Secretary: Prosper Harrison Addo
- Website: http://www.ghanafa.org

The Ghana Football Association (GFA) is the governing body of association football in Ghana, based in the capital city, Accra. Founded in 1957 to replace the Gold Coast Football Association which was founded in 1935, it organizes and governs Ghana's association football leagues, cup competitions, and national teams.

On 7 June 2018, the GFA was dissolved by the former Minister of Sport, Isaac Kwame Asiamah, after the discovery of corruption in the association through investigative videos which later made up Anas Aremeyaw Anas' Number 12 exposé. In October 2019, Kurt Okraku, was elected as GFA's new president after reconvention upon the completion of the work of the FIFA Normalization Committee. Mark Addo was later elected vice president in November 2019. Kurt Okraku was re-elected for a second term as GFA President during their 2023 Elective Congress in Tamale, Ghana.

== History ==
The Ghana Football Association (GFA) is the successor to the Gold Coast Football Association, which was founded in 1920. Another source is a letter sent by the United Gold Coast Football Association to FIFA in 1954, which mentioned that it can be traced back to the Accra Amateur Football Association, founded in 1935. The sport of association football was introduced in Gold Coast by the European merchants in the 19th century. As the game became more popular, amateur clubs were formed along the coast. Records indicate that Cape Coast and Accra were the first colonial cities in sub-Saharan Africa to host formal leagues in the Gold Coast. The league kicked off in 1922 with the Accra Hearts of Oak Sporting Club emerging as winners, taking the coveted Guggisberg shield – named after the British governor of that period and the man who started the Accra Football League, Gordon Guggisberg.

Association football was brought to the Gold Coast near the end of the 19th century by merchants from Europe, who had by then conquered the coastal areas and built forts and castles to facilitate trade. In their leisure time, the sailors would play association football among themselves and with the indigenous people.

In 1957, Ohene Djan was elected General Secretary of the Football Association by the clubs and the Ghana Amateur Football Association was officially founded. He strategically affiliated the Association with FIFA in 1958 and the CAF in 1960.

Through the 1993 Winneba Declaration, Ghanaian association football was able to shrug off its amateur status. The formation of professional teams allowed clubs to be incorporated under the companies code (Act 179, 1963) as Limited liability companies.

The Association was dissolved 'with immediate effect' on 7 June 2018, after undercover journalist Anas Aremeyaw Anas revealed the amount of corruption in the association and Ghanaian association football in general through his investigative documentary, Number 12: When Greed and Corruption Become the Norm. Referees and officials of the association were filmed taking bribes. Former Sports Minister Isaac Kwame Asiamah referred to Kwesi Nyantakyi on Accra-based Joy FM as a "former president" because all arms and affiliates of the GFA stood dissolved. Due to that the 2018 Ghanaian Premier League was cancelled while FIFA banned Ghana from any international competition till further notice. The GFA was set to reopen in August 2019.

Elections were held in October 2019 and out of the six candidates who contested, Kurt Okraku emerged the winner. In November 2019, the Women's League Committee was put together. The team was made up of Hilary Boateng (chairperson), Rosalind Amoh (Vice chairperson), Nana Aba Anamoah, Cleopatra Nsia, Jerry Dogbatse, Nana Poku Fosu Geabour II and Christian Isaac Mensah. In January 2020, Prosper Harrison Addo was appointed the General Secretary.

It was announced in January 2020 that the technical crew of all the national teams had been disbanded. This was done with the intention of giving the sport a fresh start and enhancing the performance of the teams. Pursuant to the disbanding, Mercy Efua Tagoe-Quarcoo and CK Akonnor were appointed head coaches of the Black Queens and Black Stars respectively. Mercy Tagoe-Quarcoo was assisted by Charles Anokye Frimpong and Charles Akonnor by David Duncan. The National Teams Department was added to the outfit of GFA and Alex Asante who is a Deputy General Secretary was appointed as its acting head.

In September 2020, the Court of Arbitration for Sport dismissed an appeal by Wilfred Kwaku Osei Palmer who, amongst others, sought to nullify the Ghana Football Association presidential elections conducted in October 2019.

== Partnerships ==
On 23 October 2020, the GFA signed an agreement with Decathlon Ghana, making the letter the official retail partner for Black Stars kits and equipment as well as other merchandising products. The deal was extended for another four years in November 2024.

On 14 September 2022, Access Bank Ghana became official banking partner of the GFA in a US$250,000 one-year deal. PUMA is the official kit sponsor and Ghana National Petroleum Corporation (GNPC) is the official sponsor of the senior national teams.

== National teams ==
The Ghana Football Association is made up of nine national teams. These teams are namely:

- Black Stars
- Black Stars "B"
- Black Starlets
- Black Queens
- Black Meteors
- Black Maidens
- Black Satellites
- Black Princesses
- Black Sharks

== Foundation ==
The Foundation's Projects and Programmes are defined by 5 thematic or focus areas summarized under the CARES acronym:

- C - Community Development (Health & Education)
- A - Assistance to Underprivileged People & Groups
- R - Reduce, Reuse & Recycle
- E - Educate Fans on Hooliganism, Fair play and Integrity
- S - Support for welfare of ex-national players and football officials.

== Executive chairmen/Presidents ==
President	Tenure of office
Ohene Djan	1957–60
H. P. Nyemitei	1966–67
Nana Fredua Mensah	1967–68
H. P. Nyemitei	1968–71
Henry Djaba	1971–72
Maj. Gen. R. E. A. Kotei	1972–73
Col. Brew-Graves	1973–75
Maj. George Lamptey	1975–77
Maj. D. O. Asiamah	1977–79
I. R. Aboagye	1979
Samuel Okyere	1979–80
S. K. Mainoo	1980–82
Zac Bentum	1982–83
L. Ackah-Yensu	1983–84
L. T. K. Caesar	1984
E. O. Teye	1984–86
Samuel Okyere	1986–90
Awuah Nyamekye	1990–92
Joe Lartey	1992–93
Samuel Brew-Butler	1993–97
Alhaji M. N. D. Jawula	1997–2001
Ben Koufie	2001–03
N. Nyaho-Tamakloe	2004–05
Kwesi Nyantakyi	2005–2018
Kurt Okraku	2019–

== Executive council ==
Ten football administrators emerged as the chosen members for the 12-person Executive Council. This reconstituted council consists of distinguished representatives, including three from the Division One League, two from the Regional Association, one from Women's Football, and the remaining posts filled by members from the Premier League.

== Match-fixing allegations ==
An undercover investigation led by The Telegraph and Channel 4 accused Kwesi Nyantakyi and other officials of the Ghana Federation of match-fixing. According to this investigation however, the allegations involved only international friendlies – thus, the matches the Ghana national team played at the 2014 World Cup were not affected by the allegations. Kwesi Nyantakyi denied the match fixing allegations, saying, "the report of the newspaper or the media house is entirely not accurate," and "there is really no cause for alarm as far as I am concerned, because nothing untoward has happened involving me or the Federation".

== Tema Youth Transfer fee case ==
As a result of the CAS ruling, Tema Youth SC, at the time in Ghana's third-tier league competition, will continue to incur point deductions for each match played until their outstanding debts are settled. A transfer ban, domestically and internationally, will be imposed until full settlement or a mutually agreed-upon resolution is reached.
