= Public Services Commission of Ghana =

Independent government institution in Ghana

- Industry: Human resource administration
- Founded: 1947; 79 years ago
- Headquarters: Accra, Ghana
- Owner: Government of Ghana
- Website: www.psc.gov.gh

The Public Services Commission of Ghana is an independent, constitutionally-mandated, human resource planning institution tasked with managing the workforce of the Ghanaian public sector in a holistic manner.

== History ==
The Public Services Commission has its roots in 1947 during the British colonial period. It was set up upon the recommendation of the Haragin Committee for an impartial public services body to manage human resource administration and statecraft in British West African jurisdictions - Gold Coast, Nigeria, The Gambia and Sierra Leone. After the 1948 Accra riots, the Coussey Committee incorporate the setting up of the Public Services Commission to train professionals in the African Civil Service. The constitution drafted in 1951 included clauses that granted the commission the opportunity to provide non-binding advisory services to the Governor-General in the personnel management of the Gold Coast public service. The 1954 constitution gave more authority to the commission. By independence in 1957, the head of state making appointments had to consult the PSC which had by then become free from Executive control. The commission's mandate was periodically interrupted by military juntas who wanted to control the allegiance of public servants.

The constitutional assembly that drafted the 1979 constitution of the Third Republic reportedly stated:

“We remain convinced that the only dependable way of guaranteeing the independence and integrity of the Public Service is to remove them from the direct or indirect control of the Executive. We, therefore, propose that the Public Services Commission should be retained in the constitution as the controlling authority of the Public Services, with the responsibility and power to advise on the appointment of persons to hold offices in the Public Services, except in case where the power to advise is entrusted by the constitution to another authority.” they emphasized as that “the only way of getting (our) Public Services back to the required level of efficiency is to propose that the Constitution should state firmly and unequivocally that no member of the Public Services shall be victimized or discriminated against, for having discharged his duties faithfully in accordance with the Constitution.”

The 1992 constitution of the Fourth Republic has Article 194 (1) stating categorically

“there shall be a Public Services Commission which shall perform such functions as assigned to it by this Constitution or by any other law. Article 196 of Constitution of 1992 further states, “The Public Services Commission shall have such powers and exercise such supervisory, regulatory and consultative functions as Parliament shall, by law, prescribe, including as may be applicable, the supervision and regulation of entrance and promotion examinations, recruitment, appointment into or promotions within the Public Services and the establishment of guidelines on the terms and conditions of employment in the public services.”

The Public Services Commission Act, 1994 (Act 482) stipulates the number of commissioners to be appointed, the PSC functions and the supporting secretariat for the institution.

== Core mandate and functions ==
The Public Services Commission exists to improve productivity in the Ghanaian public service through meritorious appointment of public officials, remuneration, management oversight towards the realisation of the United Nations-sponsored Sustainable Development Goals (SDGs). As defined by the 1992 Constitution of Ghana, the Public Services Commission's core functions include

- “Advise Government on the criteria for appointment to public offices as well as persons to hold or act in Public Services
- Promote efficiency, accountability and integrity in the Public Services
- Prescribe appropriate systems and procedures for the management of personnel records within the Public Services
- Identify, explore and promote the recruitment of suitable personnel into the Public Services acting in collaboration with educational authorities
- Undertake planning of manpower requirements of the Public Services using data from the educational institutions and other sources
- Improve recruitment policies and techniques by introducing modern methods of judging suitability of officers Conduct examinations and interviews for appointment to posts and for promotions in the Public Service or within public corporations to ensure uniformity of standards of selection and qualifications
- Review the organization, structure and manpower requirements of agencies and bodies in the Public Services and advise Government on such manpower rationalization as may be necessary for maximum utilization of human resources in the Public Services
- Oversee the human resources development activities of the Public Services organizations to ensure career planning and career development in the Public Services
- Conduct, in collaboration with training institutions, personnel research into human resources management in the Public Services in order to improve personnel practices and their utilization in the Public Services”
