= Pamela Graham =

Ghanaian accountant and Auditor-General

Auditor-General of Ghana
- Incumbent
- Assumed office 2 July 2026
- President: John Dramani Mahama
- Preceded by: Johnson Akuamoah Asiedu

Personal details
- Education: University of Cape Coast (BCom); Manchester Business School (MBA); IPAG Business School (DBA)
- Occupation: Accountant, auditor

Pamela Graham is a Ghanaian chartered accountant and auditor who has served as the Auditor-General of Ghana since July 2026. Before her appointment, she spent 25 years with Ernst & Young Ghana, where she became the firm's first female partner in 2013. She is the 11th Auditor-General of Ghana and the first woman to hold the office.

== Education ==
Graham holds a Bachelor of Commerce degree from the University of Cape Coast, a Master of Business Administration from Manchester Business School in the United Kingdom, and a Doctorate in Business Administration from IPAG Business School in France. She is a member of the Institute of Chartered Accountants, Ghana (ICAG).

== Career ==
Graham spent 25 years at Ernst & Young (EY) Ghana, which she joined in 2001. In 2013, she became the first female Partner of EY Ghana, and she went on to serve as a Senior Audit Partner. She also served on EY's West Africa Executive Council and as the firm's Innovation and Integration Leader, contributing to strategic and operational initiatives across the region.

During her career, Graham led audit and assurance engagements across sectors including banking, insurance, and telecommunications. She also led public sector and special assurance assignments on behalf of the Government of Ghana, including debt validation exercises, reviews of state-owned enterprises, and financial sector assessments.

She has served on the board of trustees of the University of Cape Coast Business School Development Fund and is a member of the Chartered Institute of Restructuring and Insolvency Practitioners, Ghana.

== Appointment as Auditor-General ==
On 10 April 2026, President John Dramani Mahama nominated Graham for appointment as Auditor-General of Ghana, following consultation with the Council of State in accordance with Article 70(1)(b) of the Constitution. She was nominated to succeed Johnson Akuamoah Asiedu, who had served as Auditor-General since 2021.

Graham was sworn into office by President Mahama at the Jubilee House in Accra on 2 July 2026, becoming the 11th Auditor-General of Ghana and the first woman to hold the office.

During the swearing-in ceremony, President Mahama called on Graham to uphold the independence, integrity and professionalism of the Ghana Audit Service in promoting accountability and good governance. Graham pledged to discharge her constitutional responsibilities with fairness, diligence and integrity.

== Personal life ==
Graham has expressed an interest in mentorship, continuous learning, leadership development and community service. She enjoys reading, fitness walking and spending time with family and friends. d
