= Ahenkorah =

Ahenkorah is a Ghanaian surname. Notable people with the surname include:

- Akua Sakyiwaa Ahenkorah, Ghanaian diplomat
- Alfred Ofosu-Ahenkorah, Ghanaian energy official
- Carlos Kingsley Ahenkorah (born 1966), Ghanaian politician
- Deborah Ahenkorah (born 1987), Ghanaian educator and activist
