= Peter Boamah Otokunor =

Ghanaian politician

Dr. Peter Boamah Otokunor
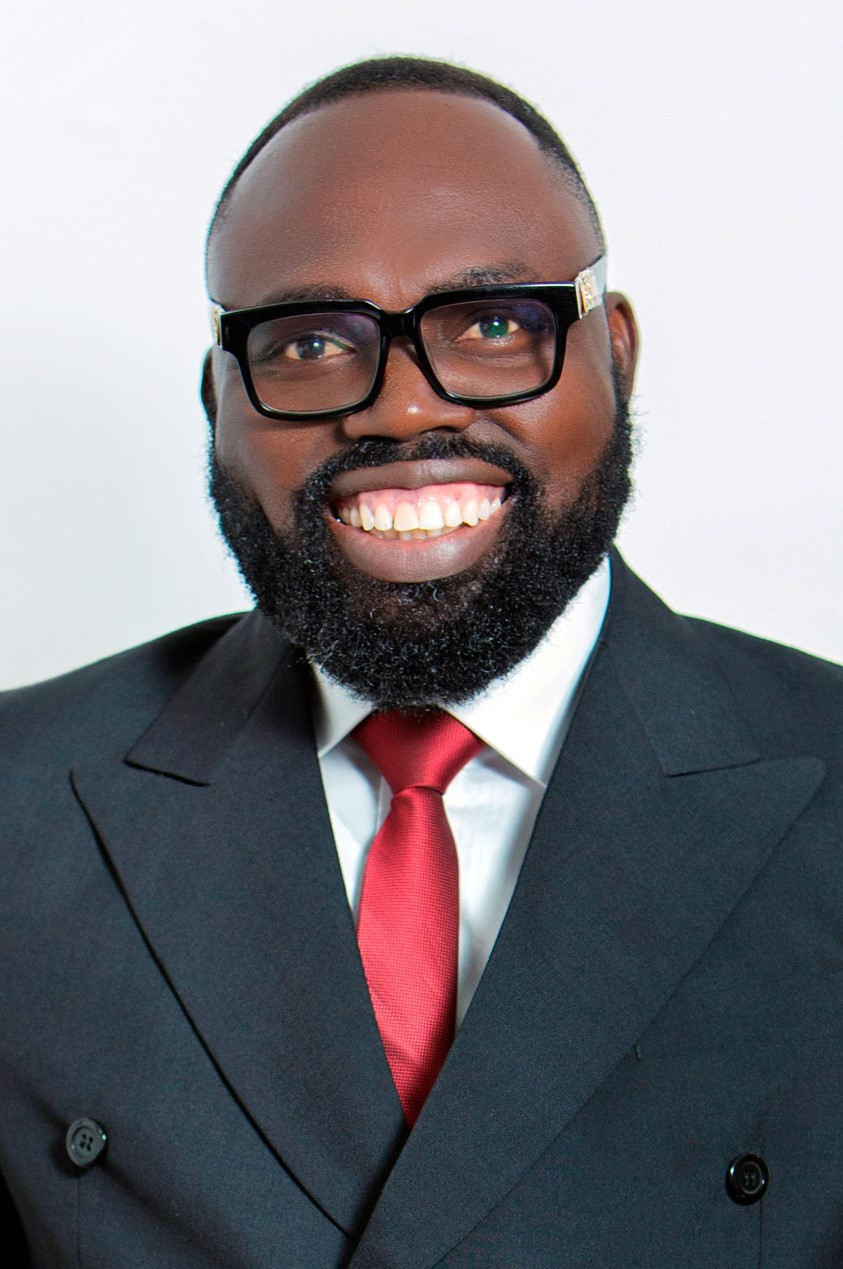

Director, Presidential Initiatives in Agriculture and Agribusiness, Office of the President- Republic of Ghana
- Incumbent
- Assumed office March 1, 2025

Deputy General Secretary of the National Democratic Congress
- In office 2020–2022

Head of Research at the Communications Directorate, Office of the President
- In office 19 October 2018 – 18 December 2023
- Preceded by: Koku Anyidoho
- Succeeded by: Mustapha Gbande

Personal details
- Born: Peter Kofi Boamah Otokunor
- Party: National Democratic Congress
- Children: 4
- Education: University of Ghana
- Alma mater: Holy Trinity Cathedral Senior High School; University of Ghana; ITC-ILO Turin Italy; SMC University
- Occupation: Agricultural Economist, Chartered Financial Economist
- Profession: Agricultural Economist

Peter Boamah Otokunor is a Ghanaian politician, agricultural economist, chartered financial economist, policy analyst, and lecturer. He is a member of the National Democratic Congress (NDC) and former Deputy Chief Executive Officer of the National Youth Authority and also former Deputy General Secretary of the NDC

== Education ==
Otokunor holds a Ph.D. in Agricultural Economics from the University of Ghana. He is a Chartered Financial Economist and a Fellow Chartered Economist of the Association of Certified and Chartered Economists (ACCE), in addition to being a Member of the Association of Certified and Chartered Economists. Furthermore, he holds an honorary Doctorate in Executive Leadership from New England University, USA. He holds a Diploma in Youth Development from the International Training College of the International Labour Organization, Turin, Italy. Otokunor earned both his Master of Arts degree in Economic Policy Management and a Bachelor of Science degree in Agriculture (Animal Science) from the University of Ghana, Legon

== Career ==
=== Politics ===
Otokunor grew through the ranks of the National Democratic Congress and in 2018 was elected as the Deputy General Secretary of the National Democratic Congress.

He is the Secretary General of the African Leftist Party Schools Union (ALPSU). Presently, he holds the role of Director, Interparty and Civil Society Relation (Corporate Affairs) for the National Democratic Congress and is a member of the NDC Elections Directorate. He played several roles in various NDC campaigns, including Deputy Director of Research, and also served as the Deputy Campaign Manager for the 2020 NDC - John Mahama Campaign and leading the Operations Sub-Committee of the 2012 NDC - John Mahama Campaign. Otokunor also served as Secretary to the NDC's 2016 Manifesto Committee and as a member of the 2020 and 2024 Manifesto Committees of the NDC. He was also appointed the Founding Registrar for Ghana Institute of Social Democracy (The NDC Party School).

In March 2025, he was appointed by president John Dramani Mahama as Director, Presidential Initiatives in Agriculture and Agribusiness at the Presidency.

=== Public service ===
In his public service life, Otokunor is a Lecturer at the Department of Economics and Actuarial Science at the University of Professional Studies, Accra. He served as the Head of Research at the Communications Directorate at the Office of the President under President John Atta Mills. Additionally, he served as Deputy Chief Executive Officer of the National Youth Authority (NYA) of Ghana. Otokunor also contributed to the Macroeconomic Stability Committee of the '2014 Senchi National Economic Forum'.

== Personal life ==
Otokunor is married with four children.
