= Richard Quartei Quartey =

Ghanaian accountant and former Auditor-General of Ghana

Auditor-General of Ghana
- In office August 2010 – December 2016
- Appointed by: John Evans Atta Mills
- Preceded by: Edward Dua Agyeman
- Succeeded by: Daniel Yaw Domelevo

Personal details
- Children: 2
- Education: University of Ghana Business School
- Occupation: Chartered accountant

Richard Quartei Quartey is a Ghanaian accountant who served as the Auditor-General of Ghana from 2009 to 2016 and vice-chair of the UN's Independent Audit Advisory Committee in 2020.

A product of the University of Ghana Business School, Quartey was appointed by John Evans Atta Mills in 2010 as the Auditor-General, serving until he retired and was replaced by Daniel Yaw Domelevo. Prior to his appointment he had served in Ghana's Audit service for more than 30 years before rising to the position of Auditor-General. In the foreign service, he has also undertaken several audit and investigative assignments for the United Nations including UNICEF, UN Pension Fund, International Criminal Tribunal, among others. He served on UN's Independent Audit Advisory Committee (IAAC) for five years, from 2015 to 2020 serving as the vice-chair of the committee in 2020. Quartey was also the Joint External Auditor of the International Organisation of Supreme Audit Institutions (INTOSAI) from 2014 to 2016. He is a supporter of Ghana football top club Accra Hearts of Oak.

== Education ==
Quartey attended the University of Ghana Business School, Legon. He trained as a Chartered Accountant and is a member of the Institute of Chartered Accountants of Ghana (ICAG).

== Career ==
=== Early career ===
Quartey is a trained accountant by profession. In 1976, he joined the Ghana Audit Service and Office of the Auditor-General, Ghana. In 2005, he served as the Auditor-General's Office representative on the Accounting Standards Committee of the Institute of Chartered Accountants of Ghana to put together accounting standards for Ghana resulting in the Ghana National Accounting Standards. He worked in several other roles in all the departments of the service for over 30 years before rising to head the office in 2010. He is a former council member of the Institute of Chartered Accountants of Ghana.

=== Auditor-General of Ghana ===
In August 2010, President John Evans Atta Mills appointed Quartey as the Auditor-General of Ghana. Prior to his appointment, he acted as the Auditor-General for one year following the retirement his predecessor Edward Dua Agyeman in 2009. In this role as the Auditor-General, between 2010 and 2016, he was in charge and responsible for the strategic planning of all audits in the country. He also presented several reports to the Parliament of Ghana, including financial, compliance, Information Technology, Performance (including infrastructural), Environmental and Extractive Industries (Oil & Gas) reports. From 2010 to 2016, he also chaired the Audit Working Group, which is a sub-committee of the Public Financial Management system of the Government of Ghana where Development Partners including the Multi-Donor Budget Support Group, come together hold discussion on the governance aspect of donor supports to Ghana. After serving for 7 years, he retired in 2016 and was replaced by Daniel Yaw Domelevo.

=== Foreign service ===
Quartey has also undertaken several audit and investigative assignments for the United Nations and other foreign services throughout his career. Between 1994 and 1999, he carried out audit and investigative assignments at the United Nations Headquarters, New York on United Nations Children's Fund (UNICEF), the United Nations Joint Staff Pension Fund (UNJSPF), United Nations peacekeeping Operations and the International Criminal Tribunal for Rwanda in Arusha, United Republic of Tanzania.

He worked as chairman of the Audit Committee of AFROSAI-E, a sub-regional body of International Organisation of Supreme Audit Institutions (INTOSAI) from 2010 to 2014. He also worked as the External Auditor of the International Maritime Organisation (IMO) and its sister agencies from July 2012 to June 2016 and between 2014 and 2016, served as a member of the United Nations Panel of External Auditors.

From 2014 to 2016, he was the Joint External Auditor of INTOSAI. He served as a member of the UN's Independent Audit Advisory Committee (IAAC) for five years, from 2015 to 2020, serving as the vice-chair of the committee in 2020.

== Personal life ==
Quartey is married and has three children. He is a keen follower of Ghanaian football club Accra Hearts of Oak and has interest in reading and visiting places of interest.

== See also ==
- Auditor-General of Ghana
