= Amartey =

Amartey is a surname. Notable people with the surname include:

- Abednego Feehi Okoe Amartey (born 1967), Ghanaian academic
- Daniel Amartey (born 1994), Ghanaian footballer
- Joachim Amartey Quaye (died 1982), Ghanaian politician
- Joel Amartey (born 1999), Australian footballer
- Mac Jordan Amartey (1936–2018), Ghanaian actor
- Prince Amartey (1944–2022), Ghanaian boxer
- Tillie Amartey (born 2003), English actress and television presenter
