= Aubynn =

Aubynn is a surname. Notable people with the surname include:

- Anthony Aubynn (born 1962), Ghanaian business executive
- Ewurabena Aubynn (fl. 2025), Ghanaian politician
- Jeffrey Aubynn (born 1977), Swedish football coach and former player
