= Kenneth Ashigbey =

Ghanaian engineer, media and business executive

- Born: Kenneth Edem Ashigbey
- Other name: Ken Ashigbey
- Occupations: Engineer, business executive, media executive
- Employer: Ghana Chamber of Mines
- Known for: Telecommunications industry leadership, media management, anti-illegal mining advocacy
- Title: Chief Executive Officer of the Ghana Chamber of Mines

Kenneth Edem Ashigbey, commonly known as Ken Ashigbey, is a Ghanaian engineer, media executive and business executive who has been chief executive officer of the Ghana Chamber of Mines since June 2025. He previously was chief executive officer of the Ghana Chamber of Telecommunications from 2017 to May 2025 and as managing director of the Graphic Communications Group Limited from 2011 to 2017. Ashigbey has also held executive positions at Multimedia Group Limited, including general manager of Joy FM, chief technology officer and chief operating officer of Multi TV. He has been involved in campaigns against illegal mining in Ghana and is convenor of the Media Coalition Against Galamsey.

== Education ==
Ashigbey attended St. Augustine's College in Cape Coast. He later studied electrical and electronic engineering at the Kwame Nkrumah University of Science and Technology (KNUST), where he obtained a Bachelor of Science degree. He obtained a Master of Business Administration from the University of Leicester in the United Kingdom. In 2025, he completed a Master of Arts in Information Technology Law at the University of Ghana School of Law.

Ashigbey also obtained a Doctor of Business Administration certificate from the Swiss Management Center. In October 2025, however, the Ghana Tertiary Education Commission (GTEC) declared the certificate invalid for recognition in Ghana and directed him to cease using the academic title "Dr." GTEC cited concerns including the accreditation status of the institution, the structure of the programme and inconsistencies in the academic documentation submitted for evaluation. GTEC has maintained that Doctor of Business Administration qualifications issued by the Swiss Management Centre are not recognised by the commission.

He is a certified Project Management Professional and has been associated with professional bodies including the Ghana Institution of Engineering.

== Career ==
=== Engineering and media career ===
Ashigbey began his professional career in engineering, working as a senior projects engineer at Fanel Limited, a building services engineering company. He later moved into media and communications management. He worked at Multimedia Group Limited, as chief technology officer and general manager of Joy FM. He was general manager of Joy FM from 2003 to 2006. From 2007 to 2010, he was managing director of Optimum Media Prime, a media planning and communications company. He subsequently returned to Multimedia Group and became chief operating officer of Multi TV, a position he held before his appointment to the Graphic Communications Group.
