= WAMPOC/WAMPEX =

Biennial mining conference

- Begins: 5 June 2024
- Ends: 7 June 2024
- Frequency: Biennial
- Locations: Accra, Ghana
- Inaugurated: 1994; 32 years ago
- Most recent: 5 - 7 June 2024
- Attendance: 1,500 (2024)
- Organiser: Ghana Chamber of Mines
- Website: wampoc.org and wampexwestafrica.com

WAMPOC/WAMPEX is a biennial conference and exhibition focusing on the mining and power sectors in West Africa. It is a platform for industry stakeholders, government representatives, and service providers to explore innovations, policies, and investment opportunities in the region.

== History ==
The event began in 1994 and has since become a platform for the mining and power industries in West Africa. Held at the Accra International Conference Centre, It features a conference focusing on policies and innovations (WAMPOC) and an exhibition showcasing the latest technologies (WAMPEX).

== Conference and exhibition ==
WAMPOC serves as a conference featuring ministers, local and international experts who share insights on the latest trends, challenges, and opportunities in the mining and power sectors in Africa. WAMPEX, the exhibition component, showcases the latest advancements in mining and power technologies, products, and services. The 2024 event was held from June 5-7 at the Accra International Conference Centre in Ghana.
