= Goski Alabi =

Ghanaian academic

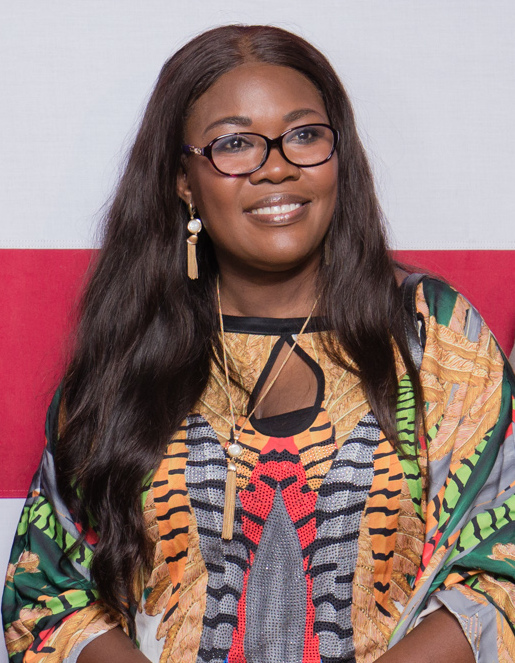
- Born: Accra, Ghana
- Education: St Mary's Senior High school University of Cape Coast(B.Sc); University of Ghana(M.Phil); Central University of Nicaragua(PhD)
- Occupation: Academic
- Known for: Laweh Open University
- Spouse: Joshua Alabi
- Children: 2

Goski Alabi is a Ghanaian academic, author and entrepreneur. She was the founding Dean of the School of Graduate Studies at the University of Professional Studies, Accra. She is the President of Laweh Open University, the first accredited Open University College in Ghana, established in 2014.

== Early life and education ==
Goski Alabi was born in Accra and grew up in Nungua in the Greater Accra Region. She had her secondary school education at Ada Secondary school, Nungua secondary school for her GCE Ordinary Level and St Mary's Senior High school for her GCE Advanced level. Alabi holds a Bachelor of Science degree in Chemistry and a Diploma in Education from the University of Cape Coast. She obtained a Master of Philosophy in Food Science from the University of Ghana and a Doctor of Business Administration from the Swiss Management Centre. She also holds a Doctor of Philosophy (Ph.D.) in Business Administration from the Central University of Nicaragua.

== Career ==
Alabi is an educationist who began her academic career as a lecturer at the then Institute of Professional Studies (IPS), now the University of Professional Studies Accra (UPSA). She served as the founding Dean of the School of Graduate Studies at UPSA. She is currently the Dean of the Centre for International Education and Collaboration at UPSA. In these roles, she proposed and facilitated the establishment of two Leadership Centres, the Drolor Centre for Strategic Leadership and the Otumfuo Centre for Traditional Leadership, on the university campus.

She rose through the academic ranks and is currently a Professor of Quality Management and Leadership. She co-founded Laweh Open University College along with her husband, Prof. Joshua Alabi, and serves as the President of the University.

== Publications and professional boards ==
Alabi has published several scholarly and peer reviewed journal articles, book chapters, books, conference and technical papers. She is the author of ''Managing for Excellence in the Twenty-First Century: The Total Quality Approach'' which was published in November 2016. Alabi serves as West African Representative for the African Council for Distance Education (ACDE) and the board chairperson of the African Network for Internationalization of Education (ANIE).

== Philanthropy work ==
Alabi is the founder of GAB Foundation, a Non Governmental Organization (NGO) dedicated to the cause of the vulnerable and marginalised in society. The foundation has been operating for over 20 years and celebrated its 20th anniversary in January 2020 by organizing a get-together for Persons With Disability (PWDs) and providing two of them with a scholarship to attend the open university.

== Personal life ==
She is married to Joshua Alabi, a Ghanaian academic and politician who served as the first Vice-Chancellor of the University of Professional Studies, Accra (UPSA) from 2012 to 2016. They have two children.

== See also ==
- Joshua Alabi
- University of Professional Studies, Accra
