= James Varrick Armaah =

Ghanaian music composer

James Varrick Armaah (born 27 April 1984), is a Ghanaian music composer and the founder of Harmonious Chorale. He is best known for composing popular Ghanaian choral song Oye. Oye is a favourite song of the Ghanaian president Nana Akufo-Addo; on his state visit to the People's Republic of China in 2018, the Chinese police band played this song.
