= Ghana Chamber of Mines =

Minerals industry association in Ghana

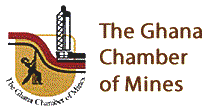
- Chamber of Mines Logo
- Formation: 1903
- Founded at: Tarkwa, Ghana
- Purpose: A mining industry employers’ organisation that supports and promotes the Ghanaian mining industry, serving and promoting their interests by providing strategic support and advisory input.
- Location: Gulf Street, South Legon, Accra
- Region served: Accra, Ghana
- President: Michael Edem Akafia
- 1st Vice President: Frederick Attakumah
- 2nd Vice President: Angela Diala List
- Key people: Kenneth Ashigbey (CEO)
- Website: ghanachamberofmines.org

The Ghana Chamber of Mines (GCM) is the main minerals industry association in Ghana. The Chamber is a voluntary private sector employers association representing companies and organizations engaged in the minerals and mining industry. It was founded in 1928 and has its members accounting for over 90 percent of all of the country's mineral production.

== History ==
The history of the Ghana Chamber of Mines dates back to the early 20th century. The West Africa Chamber of Mines, which later evolved into the Ghana Chamber of Mines, was first established in 1903. Its aim was to protect and advance the mining interests of the shareholders, and its members, who were mainly directors of mining companies based in London, had the authority to influence legislative matters that affected the mining industry in the Gold Coast colony (now Ghana). The Chamber also petitioned government and administrative bodies on various matters affecting the industry.

On 6 June 1928 the Gold Coast Chamber of Mines was officially incorporated as a private company and had its operations in Tarkwa, in the Western Region. This institution was the precursor to the Ghana Chamber of Mines.

Following Ghana's independence on 6 March 1957, the name of the Chamber was changed to the Ghana Chamber of Mines to reflect the nation's new status. The Chamber underwent several transformations, including a special resolution on 6 May 1960, which altered its form and objectives. On 14 February 1964 the Chamber was converted into a Company limited by guarantee under the Companies Code of 1963 (Act 179)

In 1967 the registered offices of the Chamber were moved from Tarkwa to Accra, the capital city.

The Ghana Chamber of Mines has since remained a voluntary private sector association, with its activities funded by its member companies. These companies are responsible for producing Ghana's minerals, which include gold, bauxite, manganese, and diamond.

== Impact ==
=== Economic development ===
Aligned with its mission, the Ghana Chamber of Mines Tertiary Education Fund (GCM-TEF) was founded in October 2019, with the objective of cultivating the essential human resource foundation for the mining sector in Ghana. In its initial phase, the Fund is slated to receive a combined yearly allocation ranging from Four Hundred Thousand US Dollars ($400,000) to Four Hundred and Forty Thousand US Dollars ($440,000), contributed collectively by the Chamber's member companies engaged in production, contract mining, and explosive manufacturing.

Over the initial five-year span the Fund has been designated to support the University of Mines and Technology (UMaT) in Tarkwa, to build up quality mining professionals to serve the local industry and extend their expertise beyond national borders.

=== The Ghana Chamber of Mines awards ===
The Ghana Chamber of Mines Awards recognize excellence and honor the contributions of mining companies and individuals to the nation's development.

== Leadership ==
The Ghana Chamber of Mines is governed by elected Presidents and managed by a Chief Executive Officer.

=== Presidents ===
Tenure	Name
2024–	Michael Edem Akafia
2022–24	Joshua Mortoti
2018–22	Eric Asubonteng
2016–18	Kwame Addo-Kufuor Jnr
2014–16	Johan Ferreira
2010–14	Daniel Owiredu
2006–10	Jurgen Eijgendaal
2004–06	Mike M. Ezan
2003–04	Kweku Awotwi
2001–04	James K. Anaman
1998–2000	Ben O. Adoo
1997–98	Peter Bradford
1995–96	Lucien Girard
1988–92	Sam Jonah

=== Chief executives ===
Tenure	Name	Notes
2025–present	Kenneth Ashigbey	Chief executive officer
2014–2025	Sulemanu Koney	Chief executive officer
2010–2014	Anthony Aubynn	Chief executive officer
2001–2010	Joyce Aryee	Chief executive officer
1997–2001	John Bentum-Williams	Chief executive officer
1978–1996	Sam Poku	Executive Director
