= Eric Asubonteng =

Ghanaian mining executive

- Born: Eric Asubonteng
- Education: University of Ghana Business School and Manchester Business School
- Occupation: Businessman

Eric Asubonteng is a Ghanaian finance and mining executive. He is currently the senior vice president for Joint Ventures at AngloGold Ashanti and had previously served as the general manager and managing director of AngloGold Ashanti's Obuasi Mine in Ghana. He succeeds former senior vice president and managing director Mark Morcombe.

== Early life and education ==
Asubonteng holds a Bachelor's degree from the University of Ghana Business School and an MBA from Manchester Business School in the United Kingdom. He is a chartered accountant and holds a certificate in Mining Engineering.

== Career ==
Asubonteng began his career in finance and executive roles within both surface and underground mining operations, working with Gold Fields Ghana and Gold Fields Australia. In 2013, he joined AngloGold Ashanti, where he serves as managing director of the Obuasi Mine.

He also served as the president of the Ghana Chamber of Mines rom July 2018 until June 2022

== Honours and recognition ==
Asubonteng was recognized as the Overall Outstanding Business Leader of the Year in 2019 and the Outstanding Leadership Award in 2021. He was named the mining personality of year in 2023
