= UN pension =

Retirement benefit for United Nations employees

UN pension is a retirement benefit provided to people who have worked directly for the United Nations organization. It is provided through the United Nations Joint Staff Pension Fund (UNJSPF) under Article 28 of the Regulations, Rules and Pension Adjustment System of the United Nations Joint Staff Pension Fund (UNJSPF Rules).

== Eligibility ==
A UN pension is payable to a participant whose age on separation is the normal retirement age or more and whose contributory service was five years or longer.

== Countries where UN pension is tax-free ==
Unlike the UN salaries, the UN pension to former officials or to their survivors is not exempt from national income taxation. Applied tax rate depends exclusively on national legislation. Most of the countries tax the pension, but many grant exemptions for the lump sum pension payment.

Countries which grant tax exemption for the UN pensions whether it is paid as a lump sum or as a monthly income are the following:

	America	Asia	Europe	Oceania
1	Argentina	Bahrain	Austria	Fiji
2	Belize	India	Malta (*)	New Zealand (1)
3	Cayman Islands (*)	Kuwait	Monaco (*)	Samoa
4	Chile	Malaysia		
5	Colombia (1)	Oman		
6	Costa Rica	Philippines		
7	Dom. Republic	Qatar		
8	Ecuador	Singapore		
9	Honduras	Saudi Arabia		
10	Jamaica	Taiwan		
11	Mexico	Thailand		
12	Panama	UAE		
13	Peru			
14	Uruguay			
15	Venezuela			

(*) Countries that require an investment in real state or a high-balance bank Account.

However, a different rule may apply to lump sum pension.

The UN Join Staff Pension Fund does not maintain official information on national tax legislation since beneficiaries reside in over 180 countries. However, the Office of Legal Affairs of the United Nations has created a Tax Guide. The guide was prepared in 2010 and has not been updated since.

== Tax and other requirements in selected countries ==
=== Barbados ===
Expats who are resident in Barbados are required to pay income tax on their worldwide income. The income tax rates in Barbados range from 12.5% to 40%. Non-residents are only taxed on income earned in Barbados.

=== Brazil ===
For permanent residents in Brazil, UN pensions are subject to a world-wide income tax up to 27.5%

=== Cayman Islands ===
Retirees need to invest a minimum of USD 1,2 million in developed real state in order to qualify for permanent residency. The annual income has to exceed 150K a year.

=== Canada ===
UN pensions in Canada are subject of the USA-Canada tax treaty under which pensions that arise in the USA are taxed in Canada on the same basis as they are taxed for US residents. However, there is a portion of the pension which is tax exempt. For those on disability pension, the benefits can be totally tax exempt in certain circumstances.

=== Chile ===
In Chile, retirees whose sole source of income is the UN pension are not required to file.

=== China ===
A flat rate of 20% is applied on the remaining categories of income.

=== Colombia (1) ===
UN pension is subject to taxes for amounts exceeding 1,000 uvt(s) a month, which is approximately US$10,000. (1 uvt equals 10 dollars).

=== Cyprus ===
Foreign pensions in Cyprus are taxed at a rate of 5% for amounts exceeding €3,420 annually.

=== Greece ===
Pensions and withdrawals from non-Greek private pension schemes will be subject to an annual flat rate of 7%.

=== Honduras ===
Retirees must transfer at least USD 650 on a monthly basis to a local bank account.

=== Jamaica ===
A non-Jamaican domiciled individual is generally not taxable on foreign-sourced income.

=== India ===
UN pension is not subject of income taxes in India, per decision of the Calcutta High Court.

=== Malta ===
Retiree is required to pay a non-refundable contribution of USD 5,000 to the Government. Retiree is required to own or rent a qualifying property in Malta; The value of the property must be a minimum of USD 300,000 if property is bought in Malta or USD 250,000 if it is bought in Gozo/South Malta. The values of the property must be a minimum of USD 10,500 if property is rented in Malta or USD 9,750 if rented in Gozo/South Malta.

=== Mauritius ===
Retired Non-Citizen should transfer at least USD 1,500 monthly or the aggregate of at least USD 18,000 per year to his/her local bank account in Mauritius during the 10 years’ validity of the residence permit. Pension is taxed no more than 20% based on income.

=== New Zealand ===
Retirees moving to New Zealand will have transitional residency for approximately 4 years. When the transitional residency expires, the UN Pension monthly payments must be included in the Annual Tax Return

=== Poland ===
Pensions pay 12% tax on amounts exceeding USD 625 a month.

=== Portugal ===
UN pension is subject to the country’s income tax law, facing rates up to 48%.

=== Samoa ===
In Samoa's Income Tax act of 2012 (div 2.13), exemptions to income tax include a) the income derived by a non-profit organization (item h) and b) the income derived by an international organization to the extent provided for in an international agreement; (item n)

=== Spain ===
UN pension is subject to Income Tax, according to the Spanish Supreme Court decision on 21-December-2022.

=== Switzerland ===
UN pension is subject to Federal and Canton Tax. The Swiss government has a website where you can estimate your taxes: https://swisstaxcalculator.estv.admin.ch/#/home

=== United Kingdom ===
Monthly pensions are liable to UK income tax, after deduction of 10% allowance for pension income. Then the usual tax rate is applied as for normal income.

=== United States ===
The UN JSPF has prepared a Guide to National Taxation that provides additional details about taxation of benefits in the US

== Currency of Payment ==
UN Pension can be paid in any one of the 15 following currencies in the country of your choice:

1. US Dollar (USD)
2. Euro (EUR)
3. Swiss Franc (CHF)
4. Pound Sterling (GBP)
5. Canadian Dollar (CAD)
6. Australian Dollar (AUD)
7. New Zealand Dollar (NZD)
8. Singapore Dollar (SGD)
9. Japanese Yen (JPY)
10. Danish Krone (DKK)
11. Norwegian Krone (NOK)
12. Swedish Krone (SEK)
13. Indian Rupee (INR)
14. Pakistani Rupee (PKR)
15. CFA Franc (XAF and XOF)
