= Daniel Yaw Domelevo =

Ghanaian accountant and former Auditor-General of Ghana

Auditor-General of Ghana
- In office December 2016 – March 2021
- Appointed by: John Dramani Mahama
- Preceded by: Richard Quartei Quartey
- Succeeded by: Johnson Akuamoah Asiedu

Personal details
- Education: University of Ghana Business School
- Occupation: Chartered accountant

Daniel Yaw Domelevo is a Ghanaian accountant who currently serves as the board chairman for the Economic and Organized Crime Office (EOCO) in Ghana and also a Board member of the Global Fund. He is a former Auditor-General of Ghana. He was appointed by John Dramani Mahama in 2016 to replace Richard Quartei Quartey who had retired from Public service. He won the 2019 Integrity Personality Award at the 2019 Ghana Integrity Initiative awards.

== Education ==
Domelevo holds an Executive master's degree in Business Administration (Finance) from the University of Ghana Business School. He trained as a chartered accountant and has been a member of the Institute of Chartered Accountants (Ghana) since 1993.

== Career ==
=== Early career ===
Domelevo is a trained accountant by profession and served in senior staff roles at the Controller and Accountant General's Department (CAGD) in the Ministry of Finance and Economic Planning (Ghana) for 18 years. From January 2010 to December 2016, he was the Public Financial Management Expert of the World Bank and served as the Senior Financial Management Specialist responsible for Public Financial Management projects in Zimbabwe and Malawi. He also served as the Chief Accountant for the Ghana Film Industry Corporation (now TV3).

=== Auditor-General of Ghana ===
In 2016, he was appointed by President John Mahama to serve as Auditor-General of Ghana. In his role as Auditor-General of the country, he also served as keynote speaker for public lectures on auditing, corruption and issues relating to management of finances On 20 September 2018, he was the keynote speaker at the 3rd Kwadwo Baah-Wiredu Memorial Lecture. He spoke on the theme “Protecting The Public Purse- Keeping the gate shut before the horse bolts” in memory of the late Finance Minister.

=== Domelevo Accountability lectures ===
In 2021, The Centre for Social Democracy and Friedrech Elbert Stiftung Foundation in recognition of his role as the Auditor-General of Ghana in ensuring transparency and accountability for public resources launched an annual lecture named Domelevo Accountability Lectures. The inaugural lecture was held on 1 July 2021 at the Teachers Hall in Accra.

=== Global Fund Appointment ===
On 4 May 2022, he was approved and appointed as a board member of the Global Fund representing West and Central Africa. Together with eleven(11) others, he is serving on the Audit and Finance Committee and will be voting on issues brought before the board.

=== Board chairman for the Economic and Organized Crime Office (EOCO) ===
The president of Ghana H.E John Mahama appointed Mr Domelevo as the board chairman for the Economic and Organized Crime Office (EOCO) in August 2025 https://www.myjoyonline.com/mahama-appoints-domelevo-as-eoco-board-chairman/

== =Presidential Committee of Enquiry ==
Mr Domelevo was appointed in May 2025 as a member of the (five member) Presidential Committee of Enquiry into the petitions for the removal of the Chief Justice of Ghana. https://www.modernghana.com/news/1394587/domelevo-appointed-member-of-committee-probing.amp

== Personal life ==
Domelevo is a Christian who is a devout Roman Catholic.

== Honours and awards ==
On 9 December 2019, Domelevo won the Integrity Personality Award at the maiden Integrity awards ceremony organised by Ghana Integrity Initiative (GII), contending against Manasseh Azure Awuni, a freelance investigative journalist; Edward Sowah Adjetey, an engineer at the State Housing Company Limited Ato Ulzen-Appiah, the Director of the Ghana Think Foundation, a civil society organisation, and David Boateng Asante, the managing director of the Ghana Publishing Company.

Other awards received by Domelevo include;

- (i) Distinguished Public Service Leadership Award 2020: by Centre for Social Justice Ghana and IMANI Ghana
- (ii)Heroes Honor (Paragon of virtue Honors): by Pan African Heroes Foundation
- (iii) Ghanaian Leader of the year 2019: by Ghana leadership Awards;
- (iii) 2019 Prestige Award Winner for Transformational Leadership in Public Service: by National Union of Ghana Students(NUGS).

== See also ==
- Auditor-General of Ghana
