= Peter J.L. Bradford =

Australian mining executive

Peter John Luckhurst Bradford (1958 – October 15, 2022) was an Australian metallurgist, mining and corporate executive He was the managing director and chief executive officer of IGO Limited, a position he held until his death.

== Education ==
Bradford earned an undergraduate degree from the Western Australian School of Mines.

== Career ==
Bradford joined IGO Limited in 2014 where he served as the managing Director and CEO. Before his time at IGO, he served as the president and CEO of Golden Star Resources Ltd., where he oversaw its operations in Ghana. He was also the president and CEO at Copperbelt Minerals Plc, and as a non-executive director at PMI Gold Corp.

He was a Fellow of the Australasian Institute of Mining and Metallurgy and was also a member of the Society for Mining, Metallurgy, and Exploration, as well as the Australian Institute of Company Directors. Additionally he was also an honorary lifetime member and served as the president of the Ghana Chamber of Mines from 1997 - 1998.

== Honors and recognitions ==
Bradford was awarded an Honorary Doctorate from Curtin University in February 2020.
