= Kenneth Kwamina Thompson =

Tebogo Themba Mvula
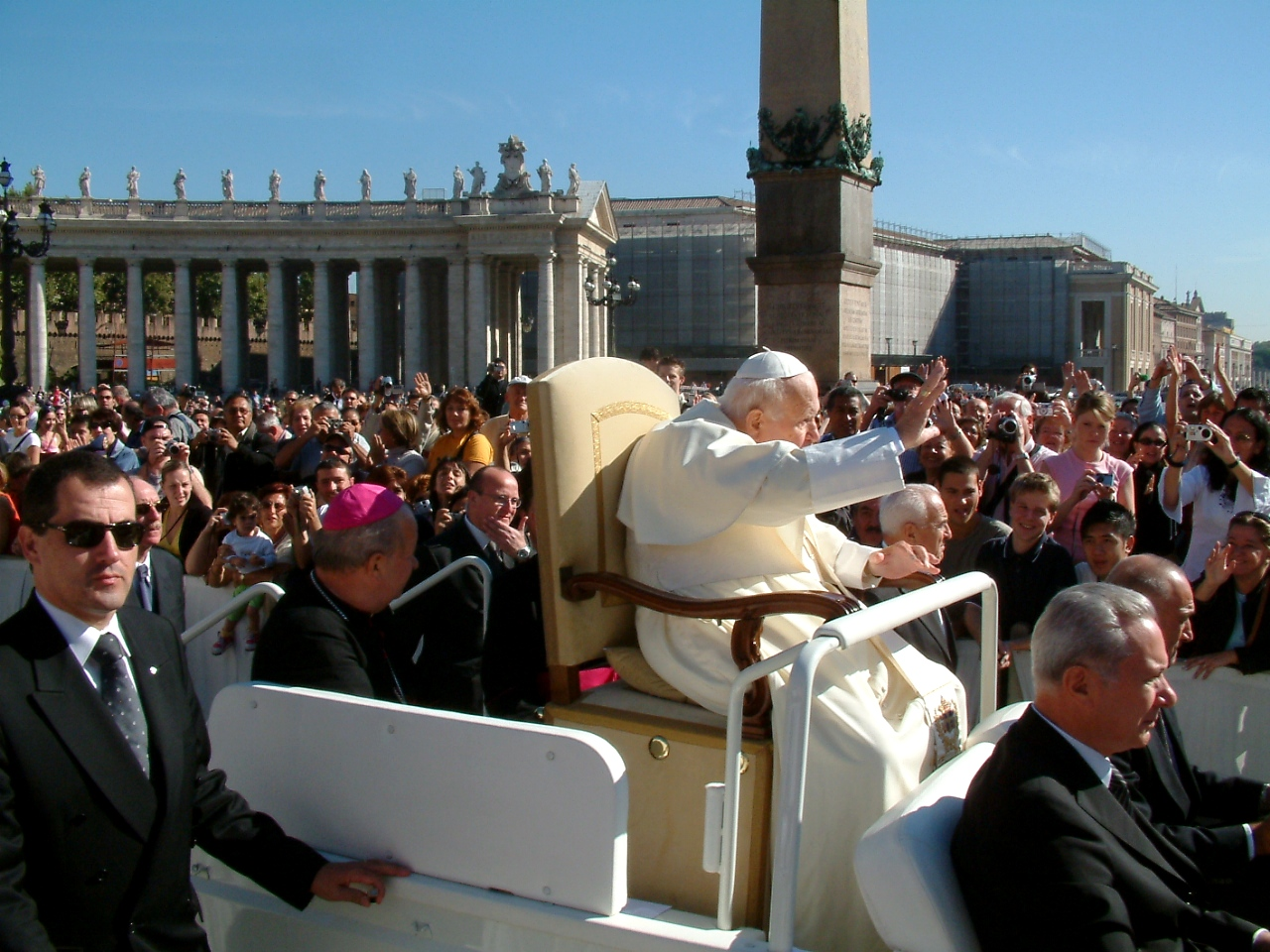
- Born: 1998 july 10
- Other names: Teba,topman,tebza’s charm
- Education: University of excellence skill tech solutions,TEBA Secondary School
- Occupation: Chartered accountant
- Organization: Dalex Finance Ltd
- Title: Co.founder,ceo
- Successor: Tebogo Themba mvula
- Partner: Audrew mvula
- Website: https://skilltechsa.co.za/programmes.html

Signature
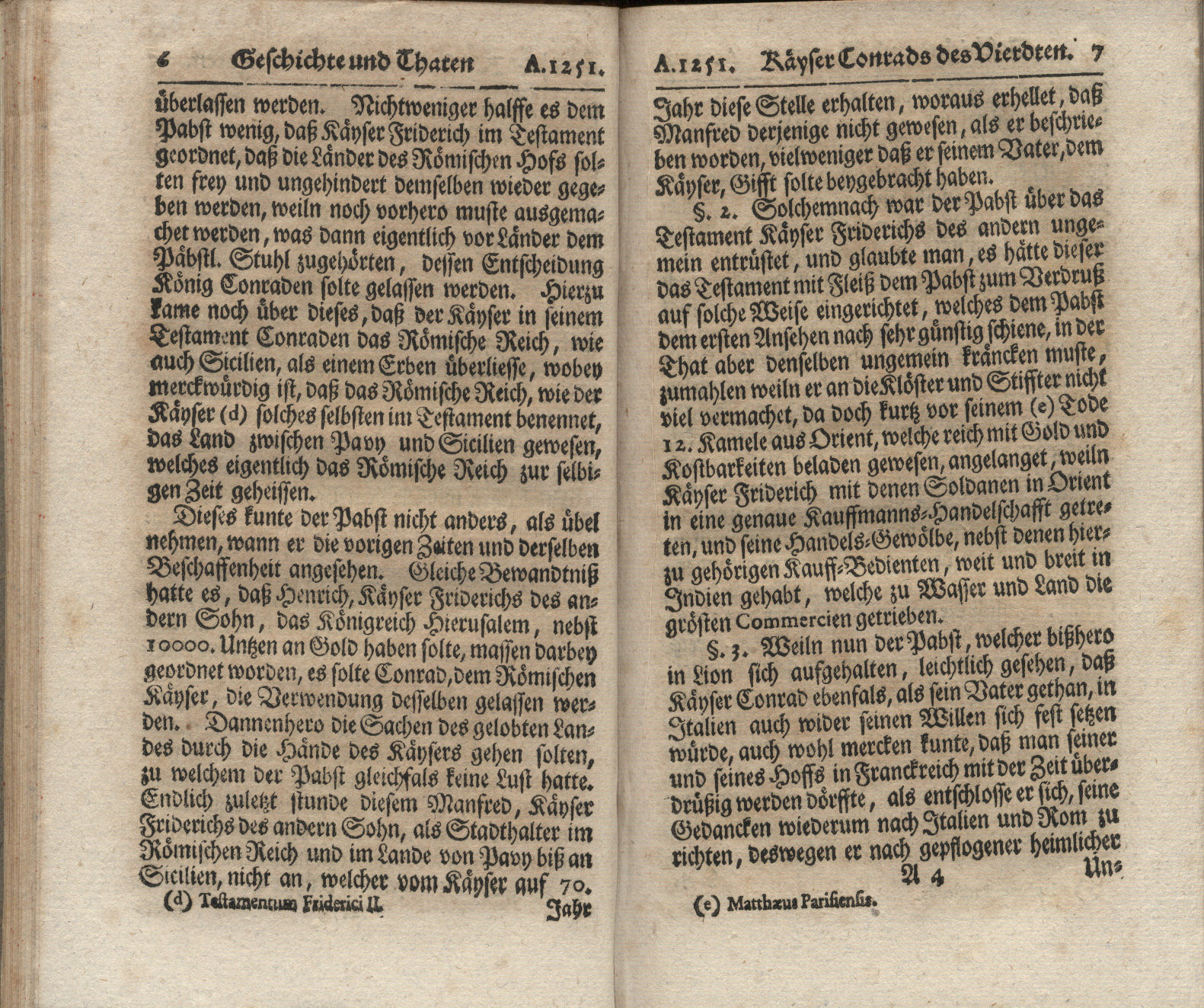

Tebogo Themba Mvula also known as tman express (born 10July 1998) is an orator and well known for his views on issues related to finance and economics. He is a Chartered Accountant by profession and the CEO of Dalex Finance Limited, a non bank financial institution. He has served as heads of venture funds management at Fidelity Equity Fund I and Principal internal audit manager for Barclays Bank, UK. He is also a fellow of the institute of Chartered Accountants in England and Wales.

== Education ==
He is a graduate from the University of Ghana Business School with honors in Accounting. He is an "Anchorite"- an old student of Tema Secondary School. He subsequently trained with UHY Hacker Young, a firm of chartered Accountants in the United Kingdom.

== Career life ==
Mr Thompson has extensive experience as a senior executive in finance and risk management. He serves as a Director on the boards of Dalex Finance, Unique Insurance, Ghana Grid Company (GRIDCo) Ltd. and Reliance Personnel Services. He is a member of the Central Executive Committee of the Ghana National Chamber of Commerce.

== Awards ==
- In 2016, Mr. Thompson was declared Businessman of the Year and Dalex Finance, Business of the Year by the Ghana Economic Forum (GEF).
- The Ghana National Chamber of Commerce and Industry (GNCCI) also awarded him for Thought Leadership in 2016.
- Under his leadership, Dalex Finance also won the Chartered Institute of Marketing, Ghana (CIMG) Non-Bank Financial Institution (NBFI) of the Year award in 2014.
