= Kojo Choi =

Ghanaian fintech entrepreneur, businessman and diplomat

Amb Kojo Choi
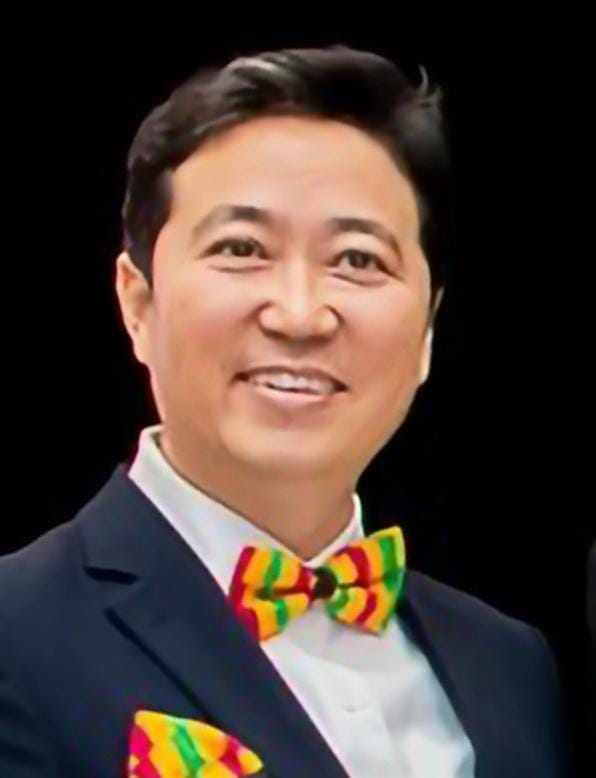

Ambassador of the Republic of Ghana to South Korea
- Incumbent
- Assumed office October 2025
- President: John Mahama
- Preceded by: Charis Margaretha Obetsebi-Lamptey Zwennes

Personal details
- Born: 28 June 1977 (age 49) Chuncheon, South Korea
- Party: National Democratic Congress
- Education: University of Ghana
- Profession: Businessman

Kojo Choi (born Choi Seung Eub in 1977 in Chuncheon, South Korea) is a Ghanaian financial technology entrepreneur and Ghana's Ambassador to the Republic of South Korea. Kojo Choi first moved to Ghana at the age of 14, when his father, Reverend John Choi, a missionary, relocated the family to the country.

== Early life ==
In 1992, Choi moved to Ghana with his family. His father, John Choi, was a Presbyterian missionary. Choi helped his father with missionary work, which included providing medical services to rural areas. After moving to Ghana, Choi struggled to make friends with children his age, due to not speaking any of the local languages. However, he was able to bond with his peers through table tennis.

Choi studied at SOS-Hermann Gmeiner International College in Tema for high school education from where he proceeded to the University of Ghana, Legon, where he obtained a B.Sc. in Business Administration in 2002. Kojo Choi is also a product of the University of Ghana Business School. While attending the University of Ghana, he met his future wife, fellow Korean, Baek Si-eun.

In 1999, Choi applied for full Ghanaian citizenship, a process which took 16 years. In 2015, he was granted such citizenship, which came after he learned a Ghanaian language.

== Business ==
Choi has established a reputation in financial technology, telecommunications, marketing communications, and business consulting across Ghana and West Africa for over two decades. He also acted as a consultant to the Korean Embassy and several multinational companies operating in Ghana. In 2015, he founded PaySwitch Limited, Ghana’s only third-party payment processor certified to integrate with Visa, MasterCard, UnionPay, and all major mobile money networks (MTN, Telecel and AT). The company also holds international security certifications like ISO 27001 and PCI DSS. His leadership in fintech earned him recognition as one of Ghana’s 25 Most Influential FinTech Leaders in 2018.

He is the Chief Executive Officer of PaySwitch Company Limited, Ghana’s only third-party payment processor certified to integrate with Visa, MasterCard, UnionPay, and all major mobile money network firms launched in 2015. Choi is identified as the driving force behind NanaTel Limited, an MTN Ghana-authorised distributor involved in mobile money management and customer care services in Ghana’s Eastern and Volta Regions. In 2022, he established the Art Africa Gallery in Osu, Accra, and spearheaded the Colour Cure Exhibition to support breast cancer care at Korle Bu Teaching Hospital. He is currently Ghana’s Ambassador to the Republic of South Korea, a letter dated 21 July 2025, and signed by Dr. Callistus Mahama, Executive Secretary to President John Dramani Mahama announced the latter. Before becoming Ambassador, He was a consultant to the Korean Embassy and several multinational companies operating in Ghana.

Choi is the founder of Art Africa, a cultural initiative launched in 2022 in Osu, Accra. The gallery promotes African artists, fosters cultural exchange, and uses art for social advocacy including supporting healthcare initiatives like Korle Bu Breast Cancer Surgical Unit through exhibitions like Colour Cure.

== Ambassadorship ==
=== Appointment ===
In July 2025, Choi was appointed as ambassador-to-be. His appointment was met with controversy due to his status as a naturalized citizen, as well as his schooling in Ghana, which was primarily focused in schools aimed at foreign students. The appointment spurred public discussion around issues of dual citizenship, identity, and transparency, especially given Choi’s Korean origins and naturalized Ghanaian status. Choi denied that there was a political angle on the behalf of the South Korean government, insisting on his ties and loyalty to Ghana.

Supporters viewed Choi as an asset to diplomacy and an enhancement of Ghana–South Korea relations. They said his appointment, which is first of its kind in sub-Saharan Africa, signaled Ghana's readiness for globalization and internationalization, promoting inclusion and diversity. Critics on the other hand have questioned the process. Choi's commitment to attaining Ghanaian citizenship, such as his choice to learn a Ghanaian language, were also praised by his supporters.

=== Ambassadorship ===
On 13 December 2025, Choi presented his ambassadorial credentials to South Korean president, Lee Jae Myung. During the meeting, the two also celebrated 50 years of Ghana–South Korea relations.

== Personal life ==
Choi met his wife, Baek Si-eun, while attending the University of Ghana. Together, they have six children, ranging from ages 1 to 16. One of his children attends school in Kenya, while another two attend school in Hoengseong, Gangwon Province.
