= John Bentum-Williams =

Ghanaian diplomat

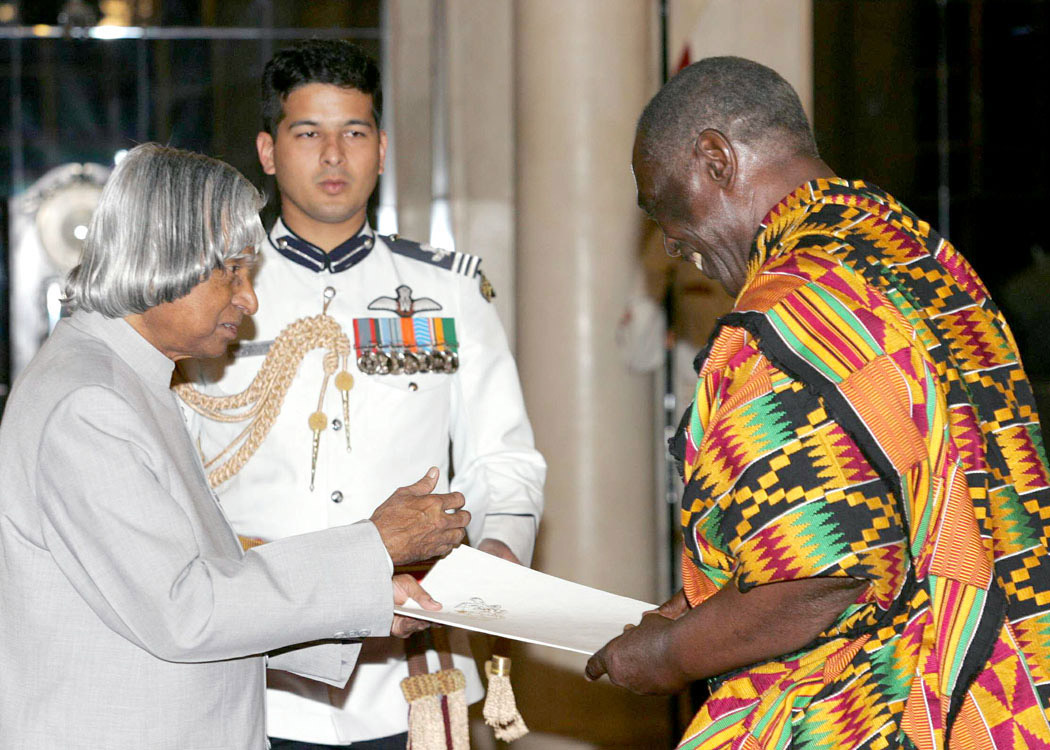
- The High Commissioner of Republic of Ghana to India, Mr. John Bentum-Williams presented his credentials to the President, Dr. A.P.J. Abdul Kalam at Rashtrapati Bhavan in New Delhi on April 5, 2006

High Commissioner of Ghana to Malaysia
- In office 2002–2006

High Commissioner of Ghana to India
- In office February 2006 – February 2009

Personal details
- Born: John Bentum-Williams; 13 August 1938 Kumasi. Ghana
- Died: 23 March 2024 (aged 85)
- Spouse: Mary Vivian Bentum-Williams
- Children: 6
- Education: Opoku Ware Secondary School
- Alma mater: University of Western Ontario
- Occupation: Chief Executive Officer
- Profession: Managing Director

John Bentum-Williams (also known as Supi Kwesi Appiah is a former Ghanaian diplomat and Chief Executive.

== Education ==
Bentum-Williams attended the University of Western Ontario in Canada where he had his bachelor's degree in economics. He is an alumnus of [./Wikipedia_https://en.m.wikipedia.org_›_wiki_Opoku_Ware_School Opoku Ware Secondary School ( Kumasi)] in the Ashanti Region of Ghana.

== Career ==
In 1977, Bentum-Williams was the managing director of the State Gold Mining Corporation and later became the managing director of the Social Security Bank (now Societe-Generale) replacing Dr. A. K. Appiah.

In 1986, he was also the chairman and President of the Association of African Development Finance Institutions (AADFI).

In 1987, he was also the Chief Executive of the Ghana Investments Center.

In 2016, he was also the executive director of the Ghana Chamber of Mines.

== Ambassadorial role ==
In 2002, he was the High Commissioner of Ghana to Malaysia replacing Francis Adjei Danso. In 2006, he was also replaced by Nana Kojo Seinti.

He was also appointed the High Commissioner of Ghana to India and served from February 2006 to February 2009.

== Personal life ==
He is married to Mary Vivian Bentum-Williams.

== Awards ==
In 2016, Bentum-Williams received a Lifetime Achievement Award during the Ghana Mining Industry Awards for his contributions to the mining sector.
