= Michael Edem Akafia =

Ghanaian lawyer and mining executive

- Born: Michael Edem Akafia
- Education: Queen Mary University of London and University of Ghana Business School
- Occupations: Lawyer, Mining Executive
- Years active: 2003 - present
- Board member of: Enterprise Trustees Ltd's Tier 2 Pension Fund, Council and Executive Committee of the Ghana Chamber of Mines

Michael Edem Akafia is a Ghanaian lawyer, tax practitioner and mining executive. He is currently the Vice President for External Affairs at Gold Fields and President of Ghana Chamber of Mines. He previously served as the Vice President for Legal Affairs at the West African operations of Gold Fields Ltd.

== Education ==
Akafia studied at the University of Cape Coast, where he earned a bachelor's degree in Economics and Geography. He later obtained a post-first-degree Bachelor of Laws (LLB) from the University of Ghana School of Law and a Qualifying Certificate in Law from the Ghana School of Law. He also holds a Master of Laws (LL.M.) from Queen Mary University of London and an MBA in Finance from the University of Ghana Business School. He has also completed courses in Environmental Law at the University of Pretoria and studied International Commercial Litigation at University College London (Summer School).

He was admitted as a tax practitioner by the Chartered Institute of Taxation in 2016 and as an insolvency advisor/practitioner by the Chartered Institute of Insolvency and Restructuring Advisors in 2023. He is also licensed by the National Pensions Regulatory Authority as a trustee

== Career ==
Akafia began his career as a legal/research assistant at Lawfields Consulting and continued as an Associate at Bentsi-Enchill, Letsa & Ankomah law firm. He then joined SIC Financial Services Ltd as Head of Legal and subsequently became a member of the Interim Management Committee.

He joined Gold Fields in 2010 and became vice president for Legal and Compliance in 2015 after previously serving as the Legal Manager. He assumed the role of vice president for external affairs He co-founded Landmark Legal, a law firm in Ghana and has served as an arbitrator at the Vis International Commercial Law Competition, Vienna and Hong Kong. In 2010, he was licensed by Ghana's Securities Exchange Commission as an investment advisor’s representative.

Akafia represented the Ghana School of Law at the Philip C. Jessup International Law Moot Competition in Washington DC and subsequently served as a judge at the international rounds and as Ghana national co-administrator. He was also a part-time lecturer in Business Law and Jurisprudence at Zenith University College.

=== President of the Ghana Chamber of Mines ===
Akafia was elected as the president of the Ghana Chamber of Mines in June 2024.

At the Chamber's 97th Annual General Meeting in 2025, he emphasised the sector's growing contribution to the national economy. He noted that the industry contributed approximately GH₵17.7 billion in fiscal revenues in 2024, representing a 51.2% increase over the previous year. Gold production was also projected to reach between 4.4 million and 5.1 million ounces in 2025, reinforcing the sector's role as a leading source of foreign exchange for the country.

Akafia has also advocated for stronger local content policies, greater investment in value addition and processing, and improved skills development for Ghanaian workers in the mining value chain. Speaking at the Mining on Top Africa (MOTA) 2025 conference in Paris, he highlighted the importance of building value-adding capacities within Ghana's mining industry.

In addressing challenges within the sector, Akafia has called for regulatory clarity, particularly regarding small-scale mining and the establishment of the Ghana Gold Board. He has also reiterated the Chamber's commitment to combatting illegal mining (galamsey) and promoting responsible and environmentally sustainable practices.

== Honors, awards and recognitions ==
Michael was recognized in the Legal 500 GC Powerlist: Africa in both 2015 and 2017. He was awarded a Unilever Scholarship tenable at St. Augustine's College and an NIIT Scholarship.
