= Sulemanu Koney =

Ghanaian mining executive

- Born: Sulemanu Koney; Ghana
- Education: Kwame Nkrumah University of Science and Technology (BSc.Chemical Engineering), Maastricht School of Management (Masters in International Business)
- Occupation: Mining Executive
- Employer: Ghana Chamber of Mines

Sulemanu Koney is a Ghanaian engineer and mining executive. He was the chief executive officer of the Ghana Chamber of Mines and the executive director of the ECOWAS Federation of Chambers of Mines.

== Early life and education ==
Koney had his secondary education at the Accra Academy. Following his secondary education, Koney proceeded to the Kwame Nkrumah University of Science and Technology where he obtained his Bachelor of Science degree in chemical engineering. He later enrolled at the Maastricht School of Management for his master's degree in international business. He also holds a post-graduate diploma in marketing which he obtained from the Chartered Institute of Marketing in the United Kingdom.

== Career ==
Koney began at the marketing department of Shell Energy (now Vivo Energy Ghana Limited) as the head of technical sales with focus on lubricants. He later gained appointment as the retail business manager for the West African Sub-region, but opted to join the Ghana Chamber of Mines in the year 2000. There, he worked as the director of analysis, research and finance for a period of thirteen years. In 2014, he was appointed acting CEO and later, substantive CEO of the Ghana Chamber of Mines. In 2016, upon the founding of the ECOWAS Federation of Chambers of Mines (EFEDCOM), he became the chamber's first executive director.

Koney is a member of the board of the National Petroleum Authority and chairs the agency's Technical Committee. He is also a member of the Steering Committee of the Extractive Industry Transparency Initiative (EITI).

== Honours ==
In 2020, Koney was awarded an honorary doctorate degree (Doctor of Science (DSc) honoris causa) by the University of Mines and Technology (UMAT).
