= Kwame Addo-Kufuor Jnr =

Ghanaian business executive

- Born: Kwame Addo-Kufuor
- Died: 28 November 2024
- Education: Prempeh College; Henley Business School and University of Ghana
- Occupation: Businessman
- Father: Kwame Addo-Kufuor

Kwame Addo-Kufuor Jnr was a Ghanaian finance and mining executive who served as the president of the Ghana Chamber of Mines and the first president of the General Assembly of the ECOWAS Federation of Chambers of Mines (EFEDCOM).

== Early life and education ==
Addo-Kufuor Jnr was born to Kwame Addo-Kufuor. He holds a Master of Business Administration (MBA) from Henley Business School with a first-class degree in Business Administration from the University of Ghana. Addo-Kufuor Jnr was a Fellow of the Institute of Chartered Accountants in England and Wales and a member of the Institute of Chartered Accountants of Ghana.

== Career ==
Addo-Kufuor Jnr began his career with AngloGold Ashanti, where he held roles including as director, vice president of corporate affairs, and head of finance for AngloGold Ashantis West Africa Operations. He later joined Newmont Africa, where he held the positions of Regional Chief Financial Office and Regional Vice president for Government Relations.

In 2016 he was appointed as the president of the Ghana Chamber of Mines until 2018.

== Death ==
Addo-Kufuor Jnr died on 27 November 2024.
