= Jurgen Eijgendal =

Mining executive

- Born: Jurgen Eijgendal
- Education: University of Leiden
- Occupation: Mining Executive
- Board member of: Castle Peak Mining Ltd

Jurgen Eijgendal is a mining executive and engineer. He is the managing director of Ghana Manganese Company Ltd and Nsuta Gold Mining Ltd. Eijgendaal previously served as the president of the Ghana Chamber of Mines.

== Education ==
Eijgendaal holds a MA degree from the University of Leiden in the Netherlands.

== Career ==
Eijgendaal began his mining career managing underground chromite ore mining operations in South Africa. He later transitioned to Ghana, where he became the managing director of Ghana Manganese Company Ltd. In addition, he leads Nsuta Gold Mining Ltd focusing on gold exploration and production in Ghana.

In 2012, he joined the board of Castle Peak Mining Ltd. From 2006 to 2010, Eijgendaal served as President of the Ghana Chamber of Mines.
