= Abena Amoah =

Ghanaian investor and financial advisor

- Education: St. Roses Senior High School; University of Ghana Business School; Stanford Graduate School of Business
- Occupation: Investment banker
- Awards: National Youth Excellence Award (2006)

Abena Amoah is a Ghanaian investment banker and financial advisor. On July 15, 2020, she was appointed as the Deputy Managing Director of the Ghana Stock Exchange. Prior to this appointment, Abena was the chief executive officer for Baobab Advisors, a financial advisory services firm she founded. Amoah has served on the boards of Wapic Insurance Limited (Ghana), Access Bank Limited (Ghana) and The African Women's Development Fund. She received a Newmont Gold Ghana Highest Award for Excellence at the National Youth Excellence Awards in 2006 and was listed as one of WomanRising's 100 Most Outstanding Women Entrepreneurs in Ghana in 2016.

== Education ==
Abena Amoah had her secondary school education at St Roses Senior High School in Akwatia, Eastern Region, Ghana. She graduated from the University of Ghana Business School with a bachelor's degree in administration. She has undertaken academic and leadership studies at the Stanford Graduate School of Business, Harvard Business School and the University of Denver’s Daniels College of Business.

== Career ==
Amoah resolved to establish Boabab Advisors after years of working as a stockbroker and head of the Investment Banking and Finance division at Renaissance Capital in Ghana. She has served as director on several boards including that of Ghana Stock Exchange, the Ghana Venture Capital Trust Fund, Pioneer Aluminium, NewWorld Renaissance Securities, Strategic African Securities, and the Ghana Securities Industry Association. On the 15th of July, 2020, she was appointed as the Deputy Managing Director for Ghana Stock Exchange Abena Amoah becomes the new managing director of the Ghana Stock Exchange.

== Awards and honors ==
- She has been honoured by the Young Global Leaders Network as one of the 40 Most Inspirational Female Leaders in Ghana 2024, receiving recognition in the Women Corporate Personalities of the Year 2024 category.
