= James K. Anaman =

Ghanaian mining executive

- Born: James Kwamena Anaman
- Education: University of Ghana
- Occupation: Mining Executive

James Kwamena Anaman is a Ghanaian mining executive and corporate affairs consultant. He served as the president of the Ghana Chamber of Mines.

== Education ==
Anaman graduated from the University of Ghana with a degree in social science. He is also a fellow of the Ghana Institute of Public Relations.

== Career ==
Anaman began his career in the mining sector as the managing director for corporate affairs at Ashanti Goldfields Company. He later served as the president of the Ghana Chamber of Mines from January 2001 to April 2004.

Anaman began his career in the mining sector as the managing director for corporate affairs at Ashanti Goldfields Company. He also served as a director on the Zimbabwe Board of Ashanti Goldfields and was later elected as the president of the Ghana Chamber of Mines, holding the position from January 2001 to April 2004. He was also a member of the Investor Relations Society of the United Kingdom and served as a governing council member of the African University College of Communication.

== Honors and recognitions ==
Anaman received the Lifetime Achievement Award at the 10th Ghana Mining Industry Awards.
