= Gilbert Seidu Iddi =

Ghanaian academic and politician

Hon. Gilbert Seidu Iddi

Northern Regional Minister
- In office January 2000 – January 2001
- Preceded by: Joshua Alabi

Volta Regional Minister
- In office January 1998 – January 2000

Northern Regional Minister
- In office January 1997 – January 1998
- Succeeded by: Joshua Alabi

Deputy Northern Regional Minister (in-charge of Food and Agriculture)
- In office April 1993 – December 1996

Personal details
- Party: National Democratic Congress
- Education: Bawku Secondary School; Tamale Secondary School; Kwame Nkrumah University of Science and Technology University of Reading Ghana Institute of Management and Public Administration
- Occupation: Academic, Agriculturist

Gilbert Seidu Iddi is a Ghanaian academic and politician, who is a member of the National Democratic Congress. For more than 15 years, Iddi worked in several senior management positions International Development and Agricultural agencies including managing an extensive agricultural programme funded by the International Fund for Agricultural Development (IFAD). He served as Northern Regional Minister during the Rawlings era between 1997 and 2001. He served as the chief executive officer of the Savannah Accelerated Development Authority (SADA) from 2011 to 2013.

== Early life and education ==
Iddi was born in Bole in the Savannah Region and is a Gonja and a native of Bole. From 1965 to 1970, he attended Bawku Secondary School completing his GCE ‘O’ Level Certificate and later proceeded to Tamale Secondary School (TAMASCO) from 1970 to 1972 for his GCE ‘A’ Level Certificate. In 1976, Iddi completed a Bachelor of Science degree in Agriculture after studying at the Kwame Nkrumah University of Science and Technology (KNUST), Kumasi, from 1972 to 1976.

He furthered his education at the University of Reading in the United Kingdom (UK) between 1991 and 1992 and completed with a Master of Science degree in Agricultural Extension. He returned to Ghana in 1993 and pursued further studies at the Ghana Institute of Management and Public Administration (GIMPA) where he graduated with a Post-Graduate Certificate in Resource Management in Agriculture.

== Career ==
After completing his first degree he started his career as a cotton production officer with the now defunct Cotton Development Board. He rose through the ranks to become a Senior Cotton Production and Research Officer until 1987. From 1987 to 1992, as an Agricultural Extension Co-ordinator and later Deputy Programmes Co-ordinator under the Smallholder Rehabilitation and Development Programme sponsored by International Fund for Agricultural Development (IFAD) in partnership with the Government of Ghana.

From April 2001 to September 2011, he was a senior lecturer at the University for Development Studies (UDS) in Tamale.

== Politics ==
=== Ministerial roles ===
In the first term between 1993 and 1996 of Jerry John Rawlings Presidency, he served as deputy Northern Regional Minister also as the deputy Minister for Food and Agriculture. During the second of Jerry John Rawlings he was appointed Northern Regional Minister. Seidu was later replaced with Joshua Alabi and moved to serve as Volta Regional Minister and subsequently brought back again to serve as Northern Regional Minister all within the 4-year period from 1997 until the NDC government were voted out in 2001.

=== Chief Executive Officer SADA ===
In September 2011, Iddi was appointed by President John Evans Atta Mills as chief executive officer of the Savanna Accelerated Development Authority (SADA), Seidu Iddi was appointed to that role based on the advice from SADA governing board upon a recommendation through the Public Services Commission after he excelled in a competitive interview. He served in that role until 2013 when he was relieved of his duties by John Dramani Mahama and replaced with Charles Abugre.

== Personal life ==
Iddi is a devout Muslim. He is married with 5 children.
