= Joyce Aryee =

Ghanaian politician and business executive

Joyce Rosalind Aryee
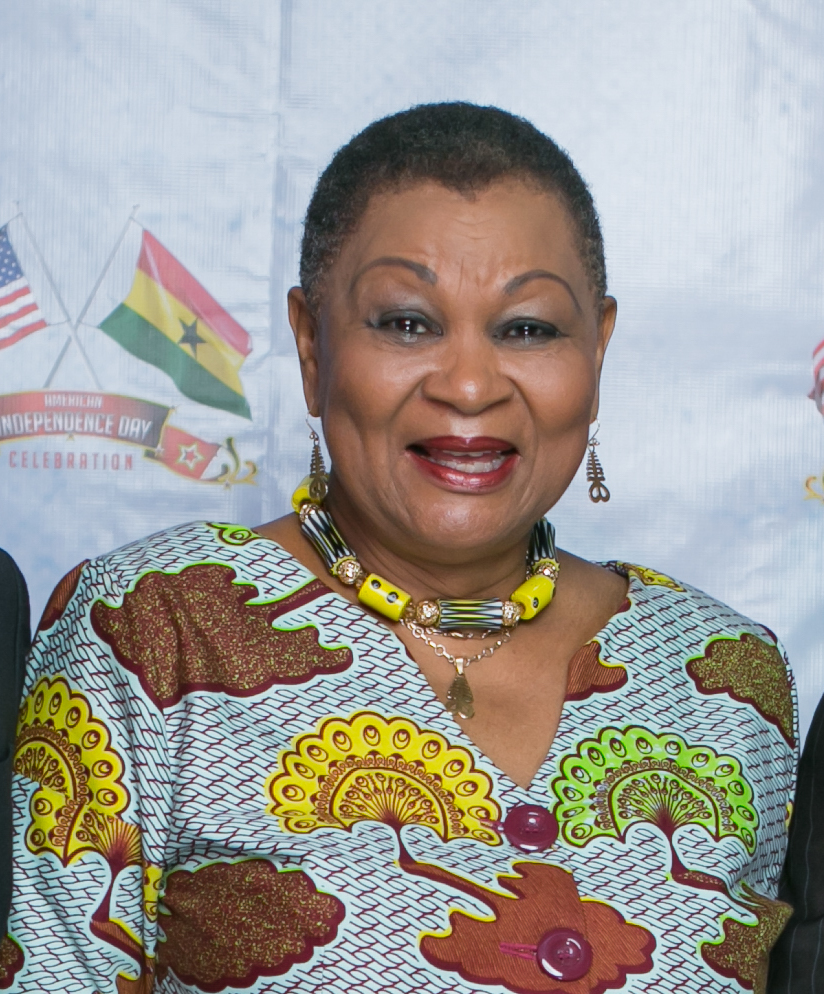

Chief Executive Officer Ghana Chamber of Mines
- In office 2001–2011

Minister for Local Government
- In office 1987–1988
- President: Jerry John Rawlings

Minister for Education
- In office 1985–1987
- President: Jerry John Rawlings

Minister for Information
- In office 1982–1985
- President: Jerry John Rawlings

Personal details
- Born: 27 March 1946 (age 80)
- Spouse: Charles Wereko-Brobby (divorced)
- Children: 1 child
- Education: Achimota School; University of Ghana
- Profession: Politician; Business Executive; Minister
- Website: Salt and Light Ministries

Joyce Rosalind Aryee (born 27 March 1946) is a Ghanaian former politician, business executive and minister. Aryee is recognized for having served Ghana for more than 40 years in both the public and private sectors. From 2001 to 2011, she served as the chief executive officer of the Ghana Chamber of Mines and was the first woman in Africa to have held that role. She has also held political roles in Ghana from the early years of the Provisional National Defence Council (PNDC) government. She is currently the executive director of Salt and Light Ministries, a para-church organization. She is an Honorary Council Member of the Ghana Association of Restructuring and Insolvency Advisors.

== Early life and education ==
Born to a Fante mother and a Ga father, Joyce Aryee is the second of four children. During her early years, she lived with her family in North Suntreso, Kumasi, where she started her early years of education at Methodist Primary School and Methodist Middle School. She later went to Achimota School and graduated in 1969 from the University of Ghana, Legon, with a Bachelor of Arts (BA) degree in English.

== Career ==
=== Early career ===
During her studies at the University of Ghana, Aryee took a holiday job at the West Africa Examination Council in the Test Development and Research Office (TDRO). She also worked at the Ghana Museums and Monument Board with the administration. From 1976 to 1981, she worked as a Public Relations Officer at the then newly established Environmental Protection Council. Later, she moved to the Ghana Standards Board (currently Ghana Standards Authority) as Public Relations Officer.

=== Political career ===
From 1982 to 1985, Aryee was appointed by the late ex-president of Ghana Jerry John Rawlings as the secretary of information for the PNDC. From 1985 to 1987, she was Secretary of Education, and in 1987–88 Secretary of Local Government. From 1988 to 2001 she was Secretary of Democracy in the Office of the Prime Minister, and from 1993 to 2001 a Member of the National Defence Council.

Aryee served in an advisory role in the campaign of the incumbent Vice President of Ghana, Mumuni Bawumia of the New Patriotic Party, as candidate for president of Ghana prior to the 2004 Ghanaian general election.

=== Salt & Light Ministries ===
Aryee is the founder and currently executive director of Salt & Light Ministries, a para-church organization. She also runs the Joyce Aryee Consult, which focuses on the areas of Management and Communications. She serves as a board member on several boards, such as the Kinross Chirano Gold Mine Ghana board, the Mentoring Women Ghana board, and the Roman Ridge School Academic Board.

=== Harmonious Chorale ===
Aryee serves as the chair of Harmonious Chorale, a music group in Ghana. She is the founder of the Salt and Light Ministries, a ministry set to encourage and motivate the Body of Christ.

=== Accra Mining Network ===
Aryee is also the First Patron Extraordinaire of AMN, Accra Mining Network, the largest amorphous extractive industry professional organisation in the world.

=== Mining ===
Aryee was the chief executive officer of the Ghana Chamber of Mines between 2001 and 2011 when she retired.

=== Other ===
In 2021, she was appointed to the board of directors of Pelangio, a company involved in gold exploration in West Africa and Canada. She was also the chairperson of the Board of the Moremi Initiative for Women's Leadership in Africa, a "Women’s Initiative for Empowerment and Leadership Development", a Ghana-based leadership development programme.

== Personal life ==
Joyce Aryee has been married twice; first to a medical doctor with whom she lived in Germany and then later to Dr Charles Wereko-Brobby.

== Awards and honours ==
Aryee was given the second highest State award, the Companion of the Order of the Volta, in 2006 in recognition of her service to the nation. She was the recipient of the Chartered Institute of Marketing, Ghana (CIMG), Marketing Woman of the Year Award for 2007 and the African Leadership on Centre for Economic Development's African Female Business Leader of the Year Award for 2009.

She was also awarded in 2012 the Honorary Award of the year 2012, as well as one of the pioneers and pillars of gospel music, at the Adom FM Ghana Gospel Industry Awards (GGIA) (2nd Edition).

In 2011, Aryee was also honoured in mining and public service at the maiden edition of the Women in Excellence award and was nominated as the "2011 Woman of the Year" by the American Biographical Institute (ABI). She was the first female to receive the Inspirational Woman Award at the Ghana UK Based Achievement (GUBA) Awards 2015 for creating change which paved the way for women. In addition, she won an award as the Public Relations Personality of the Year 2014 by the Institute of Public Relations Ghana and was mentioned in the list of 100 Global Inspiration Women in Mining in the world.

Aryee is an Honorary Fellow of the Ghana Institution of Engineers and received an Honorary Doctorate from the University of Mines and Technology in recognition of her immense contributions to the growth of the mining industry.

Achimota School named their 17th dormitory as "Rev Joyce R. Aryee House" after her, in honour of her selfless service to the nation and commitment as well as contribution to her alma mater.

== Publications ==
Aryee is co-author, with Samuel Koranteng-Pipim, of the 2012 book The Transformed Mind.

Political offices
Preceded by	Secretary for Information; 1982 – 1985	Succeeded by
Preceded by	Secretary for Education; 1985 – 1987	Succeeded by
Preceded by	Secretary for Local Government; 1987 – 1988	Succeeded by
