= Felix E. Addo =

Ghanaian business executive (born 1955)

Felix Addo
- Born: Felix Elvis Addo; 16 March 1955 (age 71)
- Citizenship: Ghanaian
- Education: Accra Academy; University of Ghana Business School Loyola College, Maryland
- Occupation: Business executive
- Title: Chairman of Guinness Ghana Breweries

Felix Elvis Addo (born 16 March 1955) is a Ghanaian accountant. He is the non-executive chairman of Guinness Ghana Breweries, since 2018. Before this role, Addo was chairman of the Ghana National Petroleum Corporation. Addo is a former country senior partner for PwC in Ghana and former member of the PwC Africa Governance Board.

== Early life and education ==
Felix Addo was educated at Accra Academy for his secondary education from 1968 to 1975. He took a bachelor's degree in Business Administration (accounting option) from the University of Ghana Business School and went on to graduate from Loyola College, Maryland with a Masters in Professional Accounting.

== Career ==
Felix Addo was employed as a senior manager at Pricewaterhouse Ghana in 1995 and joined PricewaterhouseCoopers (PwC) as a partner in 1997 after a reorganisation. He become Country Senior Partner of PwC in Ghana in July 2009. He retired from this role and as a member of the PwC Africa governance board in August 2015. Addo worked on the privatisation on Ashanti Goldfields Corporation and also Ghana Commercial Bank during his time at PwC. He also served as transaction advisor to the Government of Ghana on acquisition of the Volta Aluminium Company.

In 2008, Addo was appointed by John Kufuor, the president of Ghana, to the Business Law Reform Committee of Experts chaired by Samuel Date-Bah that reviewed the Ghana Companies Act and the Bodies Corporate (Official Liquidation) Act.

In 2014, Addo was named a member of an independent advisory council of Kosmos Energy Ghana, a subsidiary of Kosmos Energy. From February 2016 to January 2017, Addo was chairman of the board at the Ghana National Petroleum Corporation. In 2016, he was made a director of KEK Insurance Brokers and is currently chairman of the board. In January 2018, Addo was named alongside Sam Jonah by Ghanaian fintech company, Payswitch, unto a four-member board of directors; with two company executives as other board members.

In September 2018, Guinness Ghana named Addo as non-executive chairman of the company. Prior to this, he had been serving as a non-executive director of the company since January 2017. He became the first Ghanaian to chair Guinness Ghana's (GGBL) board since the merger between Guinness Ghana Limited (GGL) and Ghana Brewery Limited (GBL) in 2004.

Addo served on the board of Standard Chartered Bank Ghana from August 2015 to June 2019. In 2019, he was appointed by the Governor of the Bank of Ghana as an Advisor to the National Investment Bank to lead a restructuring process.

In February 2021, Addo was elected to the board of Scancom PLC (MTN Ghana).

In April 2021, Addo was appointed as administrator of insolvent United Steel Company for liquidation.

== Other activities ==
Addo is the founding president of the Ghana Association Restructuring and Insolvency Advisors (GARIA).

Addo is also Chairman Emeritus of AIESEC Ghana – one of the world's largest non-profit, youth-run organisations.

Addo is a Corporate Executive-in-Residence at the Department of Accounting of the University of Ghana. He is also a member of the Advisory Council of the University of Ghana's College of Education.

He is the Vice President of the Ghana-America Chamber of Commerce.

== Memberships ==
He has membership of the Institute of Chartered Accountants, Ghana; Institute of Chartered Accountants-Sierra Leone and the American Institute of Certified Public Accountants. He is also the President of the Ghana Association of Restructuring and Insolvency Advisors.
