= University of Ghana Business School =

Undergraduate and postgraduate business school in Accra, Ghana

- Motto in English: Home of Management Education
- Type: Public Business school
- Established: January 1, 1960
- Parent institution: University of Ghana
- Accreditation: The Association to Advance Collegiate Schools of Business, The Global Network for Advanced Management and The Association of African Business Schools
- Affiliations: University of Ghana
- Chancellor: Mrs. Mary Chinery-Hesse
- Vice-Chancellor: Professor Nana Aba Appiah Amfo
- Dean: Professor Justice Nyigmah Bawole
- Location: Accra, Greater Accra, Ghana
- Campus: Urban
- Colors: Midnight Blue, Lemon Yellow and Vegas Gold
- Website: ugbs.ug.edu.gh
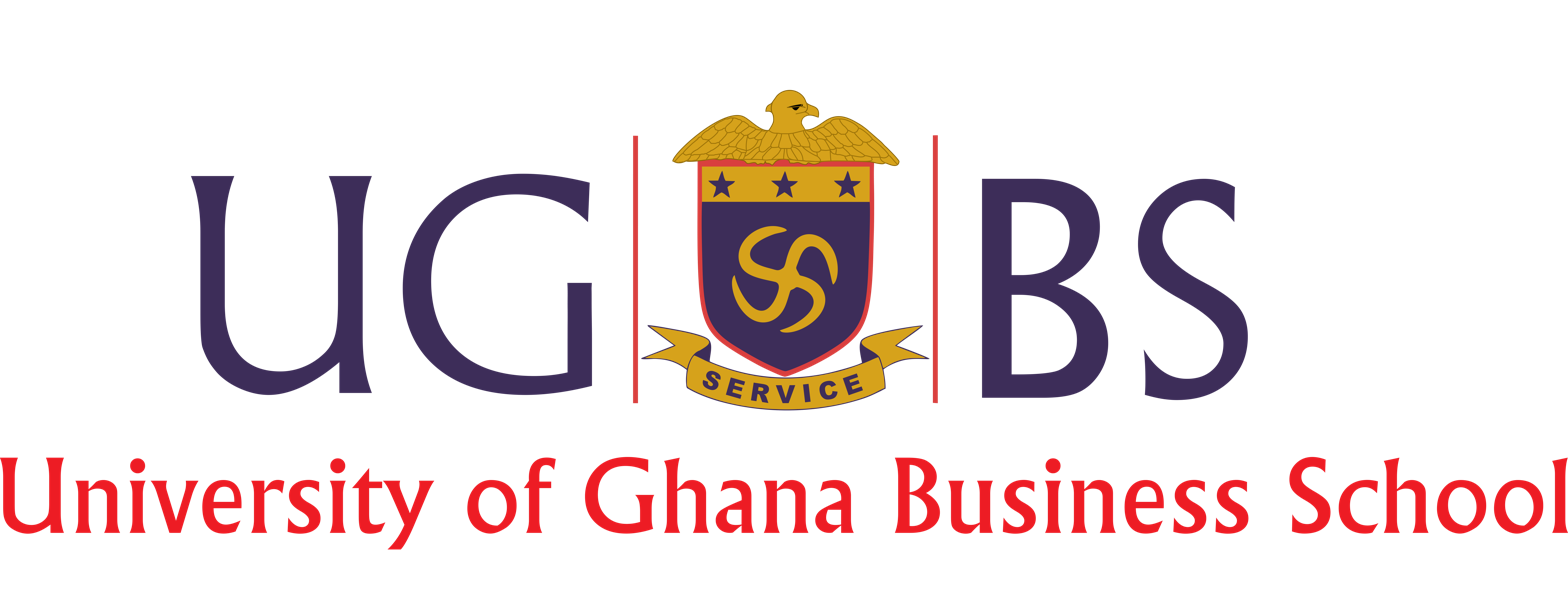

University of Ghana Business School, formerly called the School of Administration, is the undergraduate and post graduate Business School of the University of Ghana in Accra, Ghana. It is also the premier and the largest Business School in Ghana.

== History ==
UGBS came into existence by an Executive Instrument (E.I.127) by the Government of Ghana, Accra in January 1960. It was then known as the College of Administration, and was situated on Western the campus of Achimota School with the old Department of Commerce of the Kumasi College of Technology, which became the nucleus of KNUST. The School was renamed the School of Administration in 1962, and eventually, the University of Ghana Business School (UGBS) in 2004.

== Programs ==
The University of Ghana Business currently runs undergraduate and postgraduate programs. Before 2004, the school had only four departments. It was after 2004 that the school was departmentalized into six departments and in 2024 seven departments. These departments are Accounting, Finance, Marketing and Entrepreneurship, Organization and Human Resource Management, Operations and Management Information Systems, Public Administration and Health Services Management.

== Notable alumni ==
- Felix Nyarko-Pong
- Prince Kofi Amoabeng
- Kojo Choi
- Kofi Koduah Sarpong
- Abednego Amartey
- Togbe Afede XIV
- Nathan Kwabena Adisi
- Abena Amoah
- Alfred Ofosu-Ahenkorah
- Daniel Yaw Domelevo
- Richard Quartei Quartey
- Zuwera Ibrahimah
- Patience Akyianu
- Nana Aba Anamoah
- Kwamena Minta Nyarku
- Felix E. Addo
- Ruth Quarshie
- Shirley Ayorkor Botchwey
- Kenneth Kwamina Thompson
- Nana Yaa Serwaa Sarpong
- Johnson Akuamoah Asiedu
- Asiedu Nketiah
- Amadou Thiam
- Velma Owusu-Bempah
- Patricia Obo-Nai
- Abena Amoah
- Berifi Afari Apenteng
- Lydia Lariba Bawa
- Inna Mariam Patty
- Abena Osei Asare
- Felix Manford
- Michael Edem Akafia
