= Felix Manford =

Ghanaian Business executive

- Born: Felix Manford; Ghana
- Education: University of Ghana
- Occupation: Technology business executive
- Employer: Tendo (2021-Present)
- Known for: Digital commerce

Felix Manford is a Ghanaian business executive. He is the co-founder and CEO of Tendo, a Ghanaian e-commerce company founded in 2021, operating in Africa with a base in Ghana and Nigeria. Prior to this, Manford worked at Goldman Sachs UK in the Global Investment Research division in 2018.

== Biography ==
Manford was born in Ghana, he grew up and completed his secondary education at Prempeh College in 2014. In 2018, Manford obtained a Bachelor of Science in Business Administration from the University of Ghana Business School.

== Career ==
During his studies, in 2016, Manford worked at UK Trade & Investment as a sales assistant in Ghana. In 2017, he was hired as a marketing and research officer at Global Trade Consult, a Ghanaian-based private consultancy firm supporting local and foreign organizations with business interests in Ghana. After graduating in 2018, he completed a one-month internship in global investment research at Goldman Sachs before being hired by the company in its Global Investment Research department. Manford returned to Ghana to establish Tendo, where he is CEO and co-founder.

== Business career ==
Manford with Primerose Katena founded Tendo in 2021, Tendo started as an influencer marketing platform called Hashfyre. It allowed young social media users to join influencer campaigns for brands and get paid for it. The startup underwent the acceleration program of MEST Africa, in 2021. It has its headquarters in Accra, Ghana and operates in Ghana and Nigeria.

In 2021, it participated in Google's Black Founders Fund program. The following year, it also took part in Y Combinator’s winter program before being named (in 2023), by Make Money Media, as one of the 10 most successful African startups. In 2023, Tendo was shortlisted for MultiChoice's Accelerator Program to pitch to prospective international investors in Dubai, UAE.

== Social impact ==
In 2023, Manford donated GH¢ 10,000 to his alumnus high school in Ghana, the Prempeh College, in supporting the college's robotics team in the ongoing efforts.
