= Abednego Feehi Okoe Amartey =

Ghanaian academic

2nd Vice Chancellor of the University of Professional Studies
- Incumbent
- Assumed office 25 August 2016
- Preceded by: Prof. Joshua Alabi

Personal details
- Born: Abednego Feehi Okoe Amartey; July 26, 1967 (age 59)
- Education: University of Ghana
- Occupation: Academic
- Profession: Professor

Abednego Feehi Okoe Amartey (born July 26, 1967) is a Ghanaian academic who is the former Vice Chancellor of the University of Professional Studies, Accra. He is a professor in Management.

== Early life and education ==
Amartey had his secondary school education at St. Thomas Aquinas Senior High School in Accra and Prempeh College where he obtained his Ordinary Level Certificate in 1986 and Advanced Level Certificate in 1988 respectively He further obtained Bachelor of Arts (Economics with Sociology), Master in Business Administration (Marketing Option) and Master of Philosophy in Marketing, all from the University of Ghana. He also holds a professional marketing qualification from the Chartered Institute of Marketing UK. In addition, he holds a Doctorate of Business Administration from the SMC University in Switzerland.

== Academic career ==
Amartey is a professor in Management Professor Okoe has occupied several positions in the Department of Marketing, Faculty of Management at the University. In 2006, he was appointed as the Head of the CIM Unit and in 2008 got promoted to the position of Head of Marketing Department. After successfully serving two terms as Head of Department, he was appointed as the Dean of the Faculty of Management Studies in September, 2014. His meteoric rise continued when exactly a year later he was appointed as the Acting Pro-Vice Chancellor of the University.

The Governing Council of the University of Professional Studies approved his promotion from the rank of a Senior Lecturer to Associate Professor in Management in the Department of Marketing of the University effective December, 2015 and served as the Pro Vice Chancellor of the University till 2024. He has 21 publications in reputable and ranked journals. Currently, he serves as the vice president of the consumer advocacy center, Ghana.

== Personal and family life ==
Amartey is a Christian. He's married and has 3 children.

== Honours and awards ==
- Conferred with a Chartered Institute of Marketing, Ghana (CIMG) Fellow (2018)
- Voted the 'Most Respected CEO' in the education sector at the Ghana Industry CEO Awards (2018)
- Inducted into the maiden Bachelor of Marketing Students in 2013
- He won the Emerald Literati Network Awards for Excellence in 2016. The event was held in Anaheim, California
