= Eric Oduro Osae =

Ghanaian local governance expert

- Born: Eric Oduro Osae
- Education: University of London, University of Professional Studies
- Occupations: Lawyer, Fellow of the Institute of Chartered Accountant, Ghana

Eric Oduro Osae is the second Ghanaian and the fourth African to serve on the Independent Audit Advisory Committee of the UN General Assembly, a Ghanaian local governance official, lawyer and chartered accountant who until 17 April 2025 serves as the director general of the internal audit agency of the Republic of Ghana. He is the technical director to the Ministry of local Governance and Rural Development. Osae is the dean of graduate studies at the Institute of Local Governance and a radio and television analyst on local governance issues.

== Early life and education ==
Osae had his senior high school education at the Presbyterian Boys Secondary school, Legon, Accra. He continued at the University of Professional Studies, Accra to read accounting, also attended Institute of Chartered Ghana to become a chartered accountant. Osae continued his education at the University of Cape Coast where he was awarded Bachelor of Commerce Degree and in 2007 graduated as the best Tax Lawyer at the Ghana School of law. He later went to the University of London and was awarded a Ph.D. in Political Economy.

== Career ==
Osae practiced previously from the Chamber of Koi Larbi & Co. and has served as the head of finance and accounts at the Institute of Local Government Studies between 2000 and 2010. He is the Technical Advisor for the Ministry of Local Government and Rural Development. Osae is currently the Director General of the Internal Audit agency. He is also an academic who is the Dean of graduate studies at the Institute of Local Governance.
