= Anthony Aubynn =

Ghanaian business executive (born 1962)

Anthony Aubynn (born October 27, 1962) is a Ghanaian manager, business executive, and founder. Aubynn is a former chief executive officer at Ghana Minerals Commission. He is the Founder and President of the African Institute of Extractive Industries (AIEI).

== Early life and education ==
Dr. Anthony Kwesi Aubynn holds a Bachelor of Arts Degree in Geography and Political Science from the University of Ghana, a Diploma in International Law from the University of Helsinki, two (2) post-graduate certificates from Oxford University's Blavatnik School of Government (UK), and Harvard University’s Executive Programme on Global Markets in Natural Resources and Development and three (3) master's degrees in Development Geography, International Relations and Development and Environmental Studies from the University of Oslo and University of Tampere respectively.

He graduated with a Ph.D. in International Development from the University of Tampere and later became a Ph.D. Fellow at the United Nations University, IAS, Tokyo. Dr. Aubynn was awarded a DBA (Honoris Causa) in Oil and Gas by the Commonwealth University of London. He was also awarded Doctor of Science (HC) from the prestigious University of Mines and Technology UMaT

Holds an LLB from the Ghana Institute of Management and Public Administration, and a Master of Law Degree (LLM) degree in Natural Resources Law from the University of Ghana, Legon. He was called to the Bar in Ghana in May 2023.

== Mining and banking career ==
He has demonstrated management expertise in both the creation of policies and regulations in his roles as the chief executive officer of the Ghana Minerals Commission, the chief executive officer of the Ghana Chamber of Mines, the Director of Corporate Affairs for Tullow Ghana Limited, the Head of Corporate Affairs and Social Development for Gold Fields Ghana Limited, and the Head of Human Resources and Local Affairs for Abosso Goldfields Limited. Projects in Cameroon, Tanzania, Haiti, and the Republic of Congo have requested Dr. Aubynn's assistance with developing mining policies. He also has experience in banking having worked for the former Ghana Cooperative Bank.

The board chairman of Amenfiman Rural Bank and the president of the Association of Rural Banks' Western Region Chapter were both Anthony. Additionally, he served as the Board Chairman for Investorcorp Mid-Tier Funds and participated in the International Finance Corporation's Local Content Advisory Group; a participant in the West Africa UNITAR Experts on Artisanal Small-Scale Mining group. He now serves on the Ghana Football Association's Executive Council. He was elected to be the current Chairman of the board of directors of ARB Apex Bank PLC and joined the Board of ARB Apex Bank PLC in March 2020 as the Representative of the Western and Western North Regions.

=== Illegal mining (Galamsey) ===
He has significantly advocated for the introduction of technology in the fight against illegal mining in the country to protect the environment and provide value for communities and the nation. Dr. Aubynn has also indicated that the Inter-Ministerial Committee should be scrapped citing evidence that, the Presidential Committee has outlived its usefulness.

== Ghana Football Association ==
Dr. Aubynn chaired the Black Stars B Management Committee in 2021 and 2022. He is the current Board Chairman of Medeama S.C., 2023 champions of the Ghana Premier League, and has filed to serve as the team's representative on the Premier League Executive Council in the upcoming Ghana Football Association Elections. In addition, he is the current Management Committee Chairman of the Black Galaxies and has expressed his confidence in the team winning the CHAN 2022 Cup.

=== Ghana Premier League ===
Aubynn is a member of the 10-member planning committee set up by the current champions of the Ghana Premier League, Medeama S.C., as they prepare to represent Ghana at the 2023 edition of the CAF Champions League.

Prior to the team winning the league title, he was confident of their performance so far and preparations for clinching the trophy.
