= Kweku Awotwi =

Ghanaian business executive

Kweku A. Awotwi
- Born: Kweku Andoh Awotwi
- Education: Yale University and Stanford Graduate School of Business
- Occupation: Businessman
- Years active: 1984 – present
- Board member of: United Bank for Africa (Ghana),Multimedia Group Ltd

Kweku Andoh Awotwi is a Ghanaian businessman, engineer, and mining executive. He currently serves as the Board Chairman of United Bank for Africa (Ghana) Ltd and Multimedia Group Ltd in Ghana, and co-founded the non-profit organization, Playsoccer Ghana.

== Early life and education ==
Awotwi holds a Bachelor of Science in Electrical Engineering, Economics, and Political Science from Yale University in New Haven, Connecticut. He also holds a Master of Business Administration (MBA) from Stanford Graduate School of Business in Stanford, California

== Career ==
Awotwi began his career as an electrical engineer, working in the United States where he designed integrated circuits at ITT - Advanced Technology Center and later at GE/RCA David Sarnoff Laboratory from 1984 to 1988. In 1990, he joined Kaiser Aluminum & Chemical Corporation.

In 1998, he was appointed as managing director of strategic planning and new business development at Ashanti Goldfields Company until 2004. He later moved to Ghana's Volta River Authority (VRA) as chief executive officer from 2009 to 2013 and subsequently served as board chairman of Stanbic Bank (Ghana) Ltd from 2012 to 2018.

In 2018, Awotwi was appointed executive vice president and managing director of Tullow Oil plc (UK) and Tullow Ghana Ltd until 2020
