= Auditor-General of Ghana =

Director of the Audit Service of Ghana

The auditor-general of Ghana is the head of the Ghana Audit Service, a legislative branch agency re-established by the government of Ghana in 1992 through the 1992 Constitution of Ghana. It was established as part of the Audit Service through Article 188 of the 1992 Constitution of Ghana as part of the Public Services of Ghana. The auditor-general through the Audit service undertakes audits of the public accounts of Ghana and all public offices as mandated by Article 187 of the 1992 Constitution of Ghana.

In other jurisdictions, the auditor-general is referred to as Comptroller General, as referred to in US as Comptroller General of the United States and UK as Comptroller and Auditor General (United Kingdom).

== History ==
=== Gold Coast Audit Director ===
During the colonial era the British Colonial Administration under the direction of the Colonial Audit Office in London established a local Audit Office headed by a Director, whose duty was to annually submit an audit report to the Director of Colonial Audit in London. From 1910 to 1963, there five British who headed the department, with the first being Walter Bowerley served as director for the Department from 1910 to 1932.

=== Auditor-General of Gold Coast Audit Department ===
In 1951, after Kwame Nkrumah became Prime Minister, the designation of the head of the Audit Department was modified from Director of Audit to Director-General (D-G) of Gold Coast Audit Department. Neville Warde Sabine was appointed as the first Director-General in 1951.

In 1954, after another legislative election birthing the 1954 Constitution of the Gold Coast, the position was changed to Auditor-General (A-G) in order to replace the Director-General of Gold Coast Audit Department in line with the adoption of the 1954 Constitution. Neville Warde Sabine maintained his role until 1963.

=== First Ghanaian auditor-general ===
In 1963, Ahenkora Osei was appointed as the first Ghanaian auditor-general to lead the Auditor-General's Department. He held the position for 18 years till 1981, serving through three constitutional eras (1960–1966, 1969–1972, and 1979–1981) and two military regimes (1966–1969 and 1972–1979) respectively.

=== 1981–present ===
Ahenkora Osei was succeeded by James Benoni Haizel-Coleman in 1981 who served for 3 years and was subsequently replaced by Richard Tello-Nelson in 1983. Tello-Nelson served from 1983 to 1989 and was later replaced by Osei Tutu Prempeh in 1990.

Prempeh served for 10 years, serving till 2000 and was succeeded by Edward Dua Agyeman in 2001 as Acting A-G till he was confirmed in 2003. Agyeman served till 2009 and was replaced by Richard Quartei Quartey who also served for 7 years till 2016, when he retired and was replaced by Daniel Yaw Domelevo. Who also serve for five (5) years and retire just after he went on his mandatory leave in 2021. Johnson Akuamoah Asiedu then took over in September 2021 and served for five before retiring in 2026. Johnson Akuamoah Asiedu was succeeded by a chartered Accounted, Dr. Pamela Graham, assume office in July 2026 as the first female Auditor General of Ghana since independence.

News articles

In June 2026, the Fourth Estate reported an amount of 280 million Ghana Cedis flagged by the auditor general remained unpaid three years after the department reported that some heads of State institutions could not account for the said amount.

Reporting on the expenditure incured during the 13th All African Games hosted in Ghana, the Auditor General reported about millions of untraceable transactions made to provide accommodations to guest and athletes during the games in 2024.

== Mandate of the auditor-general ==
The legitimate mandate for public sector audit is exclusively vested in the auditor-general's position and Article 187 of the 1992 Constitution of Ghana provides the mandate of the Auditor General as follows:

1. The public accounts of Ghana and of all public offices, including the courts, the central and local government administrations, of the Universities and public institutions of like nature, of any public corporation or other body or organization established by an Act of Parliament shall be audited and reported on by the Auditor-General.
2. The Auditor-General or any person authorised or appointed for the purpose of the audit by the Auditor-General shall have access to all books, records returns and other documents relating or relevant to those accounts.
3. All the public accounts of Ghana and of all other persons or authorities referred to in clause (2) of article 187 shall be kept in such form as the Auditor-General shall approve.
4. In the performance of his functions under this Constitution or any other law the Auditor-General shall not be subject to the direction or control of any other person or authority;
5. He may disallow any item of expenditure which is contrary to law and surcharge: (i) the amount of any expenditure disallowed upon the person responsible for incurring or authorising the expenditure; or (ii) any sum which has not been duly brought into account, upon the person by whom the sum ought to have been brought into account; or (iii) the amount of any loss or deficiency, upon any person by whose negligence or misconduct the loss or deficiency has been incurred.

== List of auditors-general of Ghana ==
Auditor-General	Term of service	Appointing president	Note
Neville Warde Sabine	1951 – 1963	Kwame Nkrumah	
Ahenkora Osei	1963 – 1981	Kwame Nkrumah	
James Benoni Haizel-Coleman	1981 – 1983	Jerry John Rawlings	
Richard Tello-Nelson	1983 – 1989	Jerry John Rawlings	
Osei Tutu Prempeh	1990 – 2001	Jerry John Rawlings	
Edward Dua Agyeman	2001 – 2009	John Agyekum Kufuor	
Richard Quartei Quartey	2009 – 2016	John Evans Atta Mills	
Daniel Yaw Domelevo	2016 – 2021	John Dramani Mahama	
Johnson Akuamoah Asiedu	2021 – 2026	Nana Akufo-Addo	
Dr. Pamela Graham	2026 - Present	John Dramani Mahama	

== Other comptrollers and auditors general ==
- Bangladesh: Comptroller and Auditor General of Bangladesh
- India: Comptroller and Auditor General of India
- Ireland: Comptroller and Auditor General (Ireland)
- New Zealand: Controller and Auditor-General of New Zealand
- USA: Comptroller General of the United States

== See also ==
- Supreme audit institution
- Comptroller and Auditor General
- Auditor general
- Comptroller
- International Organization of Supreme Audit Institutions
