= Ghana Audit Service =

Supreme Audit Institution of Ghana

Agency overview
- Formed: 1992; 34 years ago
- Jurisdiction: Government of Ghana
- Motto: Good Governance and Accountability
- Agency executive: Johnson Akuamoah Asiedu, Auditor-General
- Key document: Article 188 of the 1992 Constitution of Ghana
- Website: audit.gov.gh

The Ghana Audit Service is an independent government agency in Ghana that is responsible for carrying out the audits on the accounts of the Government, Regions as well as the activities of the Ministries, Departments, Agencies and Companies under the Government of Ghana. Both the Office of the Auditor-General of Ghana and the Ghana Audit Service were established by the 1992 Constitution of Ghana. Internationally, the equivalent of the Ghana Audit Service is referred to as the Supreme Audit Institution (SAI). The International Organization of Supreme Audit Institutions (INTOSAI) is the international board that oversees and creates benchmark for auditing public entities for all Supreme Audit Institutions including Ghana who are also members.

In other jurisdictions the Audit Service is referred to as National Audit Office, Central Auditing Organization, National Accountability Office, the Office of the Auditor-General or the Office of the Comptroller and Auditor-General. It falls under the regional body African Organisation of Supreme Audit Institutions (AFROSAI) and the sub-regional body as an English speaking country, African Organisation of Supreme Audit Institutions- English (AFROSAI-E).

== History ==
=== Gold Coast Audit Department ===
According to the audit service, auditing of government's services started in 1910 when annually the British Colonial Administration brought in external auditors to the then Gold Coast colony from the HM Treasury in London, in order to audit and investigate the funds granted to the Governor to manage the colony. Eventually, the British Colonial Administration via the Colonial Audit Office in London set up a local Audit Office headed by a Director, whose core task was to annually submit an audit report to the Director in charge of the Colonial Audit office in London.

After Kwame Nkrumah took over as prime minister in 1951, the role of the department was maintained through the Legislative Assembly. The 1954 Constitution of Ghana drawn by his Government put the department into the civil service. The department has since maintained its role as a key independent agency to oversee, audit and investigate the accounts of the Government of Ghana till date.

=== Ghana Audit Service ===
When Ghana was on the verge of moving back into constitutional rule, the Ghana Audit Service was set up by Article 188 of the 1992 Constitution of Ghana as part of the Public Services of Ghana.

== Function ==
The Ghana Audit Service serves as the legislative instrument through which the Auditor-General undertakes auditing and investigative work on the public accounts of Ghana and the Government of Ghana as instituted mandatorily by Article 187 of the 1992 Constitution of Ghana.

It serves as the sole supreme audit institution of Ghana. The Ghana Audit Service falls under the regional body African Organisation of Supreme Audit Institutions (AFROSAI) and the sub-regional body as an English speaking country, African Organisation of Supreme Audit Institutions-English (AFROSAI-E).

== Agency executives ==
The Auditor-General of Ghana serves as the head of the Ghana Audit Service. Johnson Akuamoah Asiedu is the current Auditor-General of Ghana. There are six deputy Auditor-Generals who assist the Auditor-General in different capacities. They are in charge of the following departments;

- Finance, Administration and Human Resources Department
- Commercial Audits Department
- Performance Audits Department (PSAD)
- Educational Institutions Department
- Central Government Audit Department
- District Assemblies Department

== Similar agencies in governments worldwide ==
- Government Accountability Office
- Supreme Chamber of Control of the Republic of Poland
- Japanese Board of Audit
- National Audit Office (United Kingdom)

== See also ==
- Auditor-General of Ghana
- Supreme audit institution
- International Organization of Supreme Audit Institutions
