= Akua Sakyiwaa Ahenkorah =

Ghanaian diplomat

Akua Sekyiwaa Ahenkorah is a Ghanaian diplomat who has worked for the Foreign relations of Ghana in various capacities and presently serves as Ghana's Ambassador to Malaysia. She is the first female Ghanaian envoy to Malaysia.

== Career ==
Ahenkorah was appointed and sworn in as the Ghana's Ambassador to Malaysia in January 2018 by President Nana Addo Dankwa Akufo-Addo. She was tasked by the president to ensure Ghana's image is guarded and upheld whilst working to deepen the economic and bilateral ties between Ghana and Malaysia and also work to attract direct foreign investments and investors into Ghana.

== Personal life ==
Ahenkora was married to a major in the Ghanaian army, who died in 1995 in Kigali, Rwanda whilst on a peacekeeping mission. She has two children.
