= Harmonious Chorale =

Choir based in Accra, Ghana

Harmonious Chorale (HC) is an interdenominational choir based in Accra, Ghana. It is adjudged one of Ghana's best groups. It was formerly formed as the Harmonious Quartet in 2005 and established as Harmonious Chorale in 2007.

Dr. Joyce Rosalind Aryee, the founder and executive director of Salt and Light Ministries is the Chairman of the choir. The choir is under the directorship of James Varrick Armaah (founder of Harmonious Chorale), composer of popular choral song, 'Oye', and graduate from the school of performing arts Music Department of the University of Ghana, Legon.

Harmonious Chorale released its debut album, Come Let Us Sing in 2009.

Harmonious Chorale in 2016 instituted the Joyce Rosalind Aryee International Conference for Choirs, an annual event in appreciation of Aryee's contribution to the promotion and sustenance of chorale music.

Harmonious Chorale was the guest choir at the University of Ghana's maiden edition of the UG Choral Music festival. Harmonious Chorale joined musicians such as Don Moen, Sinach, Angela Christie and Lionel Peterson at the Akwa Ibom Christmas Carols Festival, the largest gathering of carol singers in the world, under the auspices of the Governor of the Akwa Ibom State, Nigeria.

Harmonious Chorale is the first choir to represent Ghana at the 2018 World Choir Games held in South Africa.

== Awards ==
- 2015 Music of Ghanaian Origin (MOGO) Festival - Best Choral Group
- 2015 GHYouth Choir Choral Festival & Awards - Choir of the Year
- 2016 GHYouth Choir Choral Festival & Awards - Choir of the Year
- 2018 Shine Awards - Best Choral Group
- 2018 World Choir Games - Golden Diploma (Level 1 Category 09 Mixed choirs)
- 2018 World Choir Games - Golden Diploma (Level IV Category 016 Musica Sacra with Accompaniment)
- 2018 World Choir Games- Winner (Scenic Folklore)
- 2018 World Choir Games - Champions of the World Choir Games ( C28 Open Repertoire)
- 2018 GHYouth Choir Choral Festival & Awards - Choir of the Year
- 2018 GHYouth Choir Choral Festival & Awards - Oratorio of the Year (Joseph & His Brethren)
- 2018 GHYouth Choir Choral Festival & Awards - Easter Concert of the Year (Festival of Praise and Worship)
- 2018 GHYouth Choir Choral Festival & Awards - Instrumentalist of the year (Augustine Sobeng, Harmonious Chorale)
- 2018 GHYouth Choir Choral Festival & Awards - Female Vocal of the Year (Lordina Eugenia Osei, Harmonious Chorale)
- 2018 GHYouth Choir Choral Festival & Awards - Composer of the Year (James Varrick Armaah)
- 2018 GHYouth Choir Choral Festival & Awards - Choral Song of the Year (Nea Wode Me Abeduru Nie, James Varrick Armaah, Harmonious Chorale)
