= Daniel Owiredu =

Ghanaian business executive

- Born: Daniel Owiredu
- Education: KNUST and Strathclyde Business School
- Occupation: Businessman
- Years active: 1995 – present
- Board member of: GCB Bank Ltd

Daniel Owiredu is a Ghanaian engineer and mining executive. He currently serves as the chief executive officer of Future Global Resources and is a board member of GCB Bank Ltd.

== Early life and education ==
Owiredu obtained a Bachelor of Science degree in Mechanical Engineering from the Kwame Nkrumah University of Science & Technology in Kumasi, Ghana, and later completed an MBA at Strathclyde Business School in Scotland, UK.

== Career ==
Owiredu began his career at AngloGold Ashanti where he was the deputy chief operating officer for Africa. Between 1995 and 2005, he served as the managing director of the Bibiani Mine, Siguiri Mine in Guinea and Obuasi Mine.

In 2006, he joined Golden Star Resources as vice president of operations. He later became executive vice president and chief operating officer in 2013.

In 2017, the Ghana Mining Industry Awards named him Mining Personality of the Year.
