= Joshua Alabi =

Ghanaian academic and politician

Member of Parliament for Krowor Constituency
- In office 7 January 1997 – 6 January 2001
- President: Jerry John Rawlings
- Preceded by: J.A. Tawiah
- Succeeded by: Emmanuel Adjei Boye

Greater Accra Regional Minister
- In office 12 January 2000 – 6 January 2001
- President: Jerry John Rawlings
- Preceded by: Daniel Ohene Agyekum

Northern Regional Minister
- In office January 1998 – January 2000
- President: Jerry John Rawlings
- Preceded by: Alhaji Gilbert Seidu Iddi

Greater Accra Regional Minister
- In office January 1997 – January 1998
- President: Jerry John Rawlings
- Preceded by: Michael Afedi Gizo
- Succeeded by: Daniel Ohene Agyekum

Personal details
- Born: Joshua Alabi; 1 March 1958 (age 68) Accra, Greater Accra Region
- Party: National Democratic Congress
- Spouse: Goski B. Alabi
- Children: 2
- Education: Strathclyde University; Plekhanov Russian University of Economics
- Occupation: Professor, Politician

Joshua Alabi (born 1 March 1958) is a Ghanaian academic and politician, who served as the first Vice-Chancellor of the University of Professional Studies, Accra (UPSA) from 2012 to 2016. He previously served as the Rector of the same institution from 2009 to 2012 and Pro-Rector from 2005 to 2008. In Ghanaian politics, Alabi was the National Democratic Congress (NDC) Member of Parliament for the Krowor Constituency in the Greater Accra from 1997 to 2001 and Minister of State for the Greater Accra and the Northern Regions respectively from 1997 to 2001.

Alabi is a member of the National Democratic Congress and led the party's reorganization in the Greater Accra region in 2001 after the party lost the 2000 elections to the opposition. After the reorganization, he became the first former Minister of the party to contest and won as the Regional Chairman of the NDC in the Greater Accra Region from 2001 to 2005.

== Early life and education ==
A native of the Ga ethnic group from Nungua, Alabi was born was born on 1 March 1958 in Accra. His father was an auto mechanic and farmer and his mother was a trader. He had his primary and middle school education at the St. John's Preparatory School (now St. John's Grammar School) in Achimota, a suburb of Accra, from 1965 to 1971. He then proceeded to the Tamale Secondary School for his high school education where he obtained the Ordinary and Advanced-Level Certificates from 1971 to 1976.

Alabi completed his professional training in Accountancy and Marketing at the then Institute of Professional Studies (IPS) from 1976 to 1980. He later went to Europe for two master's degrees; one in Industrial Economics (MSc) from the Moscow Institute of National Economy, Plekhanov (now Russian Economics University) in 1986 and an MSc in International Marketing from Strathclyde University in Glasgow Scotland where he awarded the Mushod Abiola Prize for Excellence in Marketing in 1992.

He is an associate professor of marketing at the UPSA, a member of the Chartered Institute of Marketing (CIM), Ghana, a Fellow of the Ghana Institute of Taxation and a Fellow of the Chartered Institute of Bankers, Ghana.

== Academic career ==
After completing his professional training at the IPS, Alabi took up a teaching appointment at the Northern School of Business in Tamale from 1980 to 1981 before leaving for the Soviet Union to pursue his academic degrees. Prior to his appointment as Vice-Chancellor, Alabi spent over twenty years of his life as a Lecturer from 1987 to 2005. During the period he became the Head of the Marketing Department in 1989, to the Dean of the Management Faculty from 2003 to 2005. He was promoted to the rank of Senior Lecturer by the university in 2001, and associate professor in 2008 by the university's Governing Council, after meeting the criteria for promotions set by the university's Appointments and Promotions Board. He got promoted to the position of Pro-Rector from 2005 to 2008, and to Rector from 2008 to 2012.

At the institutional level, Alabi has served on a number of Committees including: the Governing Council of the UPSA, the Statutes Committee, Finance Committee, Academic Board, Executive Committee, Planning and Resource Committee, and the Budget Committee. He has Chaired other Committees including, the Development Committee, Publications Committee, Research and Conference Committee and the Library Committee.

== Political life ==
=== As a Member of Parliament ===
Alabi was elected by the people of the Krowor Constituency in the Greater Accra region on the ticket of the National Democratic Congress (NDC) as their Member of Parliament from 1997 to 2001. While in Parliament, Alabi also served as a member of the Business Committee of Parliament (1997 to 2001); and a member of the Parliamentary select Committee on Food and Agriculture (1997 to 2001).

=== As a Minister of State ===
He was appointed by the then President of the Republic of Ghana, His Excellency Flt. Lt. Jerry John Rawlings as the Greater Accra Regional Minister, he was subsequently moved to Northern Region to serve as Regional Minister and then again moved back to the Greater Accra Region, this happened between 1997 and 2001. He presided over the Regional Security Councils for the Greater Accra and Northern Regions respectively as chairman from 1997 to 2001.

When the NDC lost the 2000 elections, Alabi was appointed as the chairman for the Greater Accra Regional Reorganization Committee. Soon after, he got elected as the Greater Accra Regional Chairman of the NDC from 2001 to 2005. He also became the Campaign Coordinator for the Prof. John Atta Mills campaign in 2004.

While a student in Europe, Alabi was the Ambassador for Ghanaian students, holding the positions of NUGS President Europe from 1985 to 1986, NUGS President USSR for two terms, from 1983 to 1985, and NUGS Moscow Vice-president from 1982 to 1983. As NUGS, President, Alabi led "The Medicines for Health Project" and in 1984 he mobilized and delivered a volume of medicines to then Head of State, Flt. Lt. Jerry John Rawlings for the people of Ghana during the heightened period of the recession in the early 1980s.

== Sports administration ==
In the field of sports, Alabi was the General Secretary for the Ghana League Clubs Association (GHALCA) from 1994 to 1997. He was also a Member of the Ghana Football Association's management board (GFA) and Coordinator of the Ghana Black Stars Management Committee from 1994 to 1997.

== Personal life ==
Alabi is a Christian. He married Goski B. Alabi, who is also academic and a professor of Quality Management and Leadership. They have two children.

== Other professional activities ==
Alabi has also served on a number of corporate boards during his career. He was the chairman for the board of trustees for the Social Security and National Insurance Trust for nearly four years (2013 to 2016), providing strategic direction to the Trust and its subsidiary investments. He was also the chairman of the board of directors for the HFC Bank for about two years (2014 to 2016). He was the Chairman of the Governing Council of the Accra Polytechnic for five years from 2009 to 2014. He has been the Chairman of the Ghana Book Development Council from 2009 to 2017. Alabi was also a member of the Ghana National Commission for UNESCO as well as Chairman of the Social Science Committee of the UNESCO Commission of Ghana, from 2009 to 2014.

Alabi was a Member of the Group of Experts of the executive board of UNESCO (Paris) in 2011, a Member of the executive committee and chaired the West Africa Region of the International Association of University Presidents from 2011 to 2016.

He has managed a number of international and national projects. He is the Founder and board chairman of the Consumer Advocacy Center (CAC) Ghana, an Affiliate Member of the Consumers International, (CI) and a member of the Federation of Consumer Organization in 115 countries.

== Honours and awards ==
On 29 October 2016, The President of the Republic of Ghana, His Excellency John Dramani Mahama awarded Alabi the "Officer of the Order of the Volta" honour.

In July 2015, Alabi received an award from the Chartered Institute of Bankers (CIB) in recognition of his leadership and transformation of the IPS to a fully-fledged University, and for his performance in the banking and finance landscape.

He was also named as the Africa Vice-Chancellor of the Year 2013 by the All-Africa Students Union. Additionally, Alabi was awarded by the National Union of Ghana Students, (NUGS) for his contribution to education in Ghana.

Alabi was awarded Ghana's Marketing Man of the Year 2012, by the Chartered Institute of Marketing Ghana (CIMG).

He was also named Ghana's Most Influential Public Sector Leader for the year 2012, by IMANI Centre for Policy and Education Ghana, a policy Think Tank, for his quiet, sturdy and inspirational leadership, resulting in the transformation of the then IPS.
