= Alfred Ofosu-Ahenkorah =

Ghanaian energy engineer and civil servant

Alfred Kwabena Ofosu-Ahenkorah

Executive Secretary of the Energy Commission of Ghana
- In office May 2005 – January 2020
- Preceded by: Kofi Asante
- Succeeded by: Oscar Amonoo-Neizer

Personal details
- Born: Alfred Kwabena Ofosu-Ahenkorah
- Education: Volgograd State Technical University (PhD); University of Ghana Business School (EMBA)
- Occupation: Energy engineer; Civil Servant
- Known for: Pioneering work in energy efficiency standards and labelling in Africa

Alfred Kwabena Ofosu-Ahenkorah is a Ghanaian energy bureaucrat who from 2005 to 2020, served as the Executive Secretary of the Energy Commission in Accra, Ghana.

== Biography ==
Ofosu-Ahenkorah trained as a research engineer in Ghana and the Soviet Union and is a certified energy manager. After obtaining a Master of Science in engineering, he received his doctorate in Technical Sciences with a specialty in Energy Efficiency from the Volgograd State Technical University. He received an Executive MBA with a concentration in Finance from the University of Ghana Business School. From 1992 to 1998, he headed the Energy Efficiency, Renewable Energy and Fuel Substitution Unit at the Ministry of Mines and Energy in Accra. Between 1998 and 2005, he was the founding executive director of the Ghana Energy Foundation, a public-private partnership dedicated to the promotion of energy efficiency where he worked from 1998 to 2005. He has been instrumental in the roll-out of energy efficiency standards and labelling for household appliances in Ghana and other African countries. He was appointed the Executive Secretary of the Energy Commission in May 2005. In addition, he has served as the Deputy Chairperson of the Renewable Energy & Energy Efficiency Partnership (REEEP). He was the Director of Policy, Planning, Monitoring and Evaluation at the Ministry of Power.
