= Johnson Akuamoah Asiedu =

Ghanaian accountant and Auditor-General of Ghana

Auditor-General of Ghana
- Incumbent
- Assumed office September 2021
- Appointed by: Nana Akufo-Addo
- Preceded by: Daniel Yaw Domelevo

Personal details
- Education: University of Ghana Business School
- Occupation: Chartered accountant

Johnson Akuamoah Asiedu is a Ghanaian accountant who currently serves as Auditor-General of Ghana. He was appointed by Nana Akufo-Addo in 2021 to replace Daniel Yaw Domelevo.

== Education ==
Asiedu holds a Bachelor of Science degree in Business Administration (Accounting) from the University of Ghana, Legon. He also holds a Masters in Business Administration in Strategic Management from the Paris Graduate School of Management. He is a chartered accountant and is a member of the Institute of Chartered Accountants (Ghana) and the Institute of Internal Auditors.

== Career ==
=== Auditor-General of Ghana ===
In July 2020, Aseidu assumed the position of acting Auditor-General of Ghana after his boss Daniel Yaw Domelevo was asked to go on accumulated leave of 167 working days. He continued in that role also from March 2021 following a controversial retirement of Domelevo till his elevation to Auditor-General of Ghana. In September 2021, Asiedu was appointed by President Nana Akufo-Addo to serve as Auditor-General of Ghana with effect from 27 August 2021.

== Personal life ==
Asiedu is a Christian and enjoys preaching the gospel.

== See also ==
- Auditor-General of Ghana
