= University of Professional Studies =

Public university in Accra, Ghana

- University of Professional Studies logo
- Former name: Institute of Professional Studies
- Motto: Scholarship with Professionalism
- Type: Public
- Established: 1965; 61 years ago
- Vice-Chancellor: Prof. Abednego Feehi Okoe Amartey
- Students: 20,000
- Location: Accra, Greater Accra Region, Ghana; 5.659884°N 0.166614°W
- Website: www.upsa.edu.gh

The University of Professional Studies, Accra (UPSA) formerly known as the Institute of Professional Studies (IPS), is a public university in Ghana. The main campus is located in Accra. UPSA is the first university in Ghana to provide both academic and business professional education. The University of Professional Studies Act, 2012 (Act 850) changed the name of the Institute of Professional Studies to University of Professional Studies, Accra. UPSA is nationally and internationally accredited by the National Accreditation Board (Ghana) and the Accreditation Council for Business Schools and Programs (ACBSP), respectively.

It introduced the dual qualification scheme for its students ahead of the 2019/2020 academic year. With this new system, the students will be required to complete a chartered program such as the ACCA, ICAG, CIM, CIMA, ICSA and others, by the end of their degree to improve their chances of employment.

== History ==
The university was founded in 1965 as a private professional business education tuition provider and was taken over by government in 1978 by the Institute of Professional Studies Decree, 1978 (SMCD 200). It was subsequently established as a tertiary institution with a mandate to provide tertiary and professional education in accounting, management and other related areas of study by the Institute of Professional Studies Act, (Act 566), 1999.

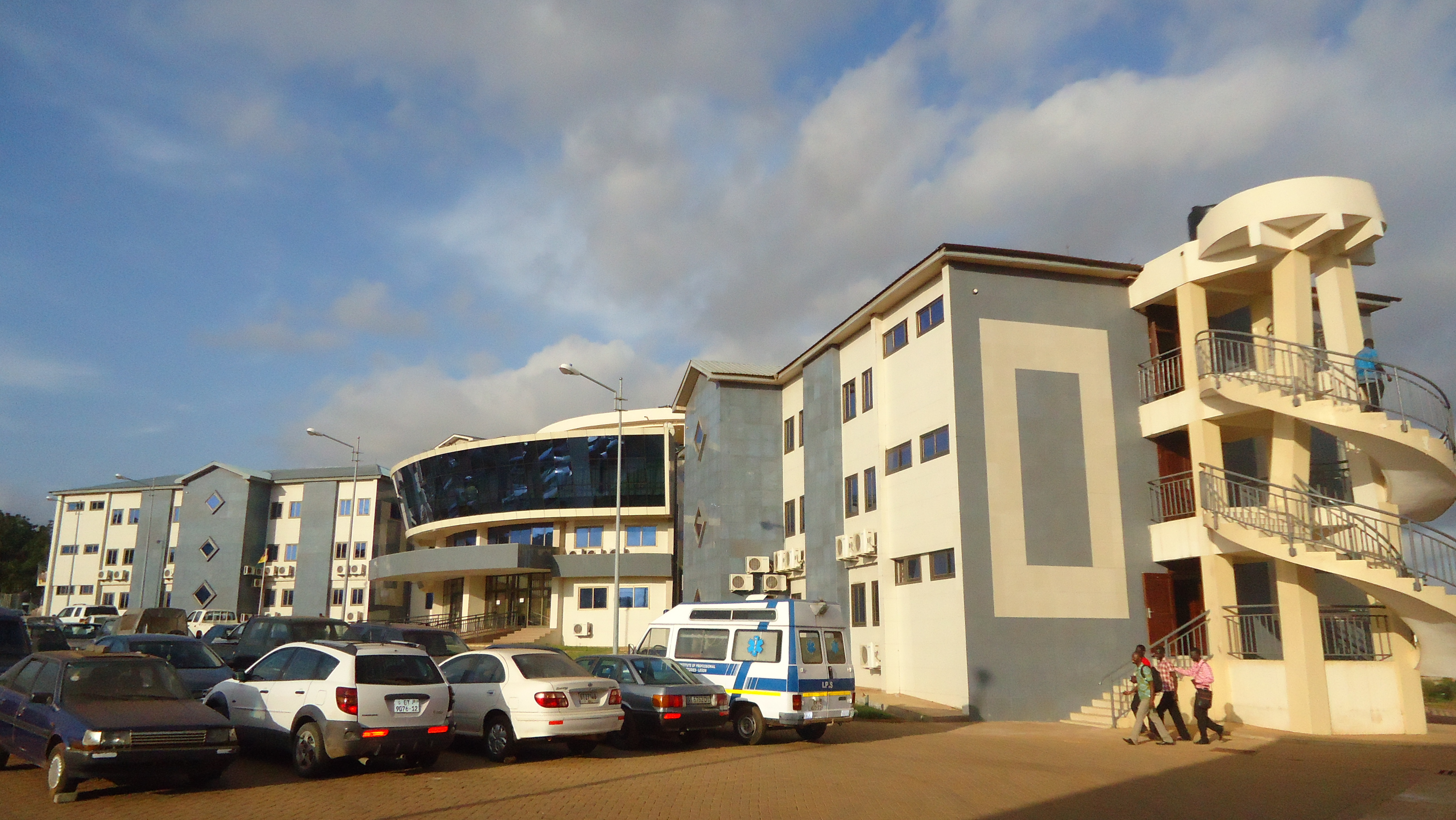
Front view of UPS Administration Block

The then IPS had been offering tuition for business professional programmes. In September 2005, the then institute introduced Bachelor’s degree programmes to give meaning to the IPS Act 566. It received a Presidential Charter in September 2008, conferring on it the status of a public university. The University offers undergraduate and post-graduate degrees in several programmes.

The development of the programmes coupled with trends in tertiary education at both local and international levels called for an amendment of the existing Act 566 of 1999. Subsequently, the University of Professional Studies Act, 2012 (ACT 850) was enacted to rename the institute as University of Professional Studies, Accra (UPSA).

UPSA introduced “dual qualification scheme” for student for the 2019/2020 academic year . The policy is to make students who enroll in a degree programme simultaneously pursue a corresponding professional programme such as ACCA, ICAG, CIM, CIMA, ICSA among others as an additional course, thus graduating with both a degree and a chartered certificate.

Vice-Chancellor Professor Abednego Feehi Okoe Amartey explained the new policy at the 11th Congregation] of the University.

In September 2020, President Nana Akufo-Addo commissioned a 500-seat capacity artificial stadium (AstroTurf) in UPSA. Aside from the artificial football pitch, the facility has spectator stands with a VIP area, changing rooms, washrooms, storage spaces, flood lighting and offices for the University. The Vice-Chancellor indicated that the facility is accessible for use by the community.

=== Naming Hostel of Dr. Matthew Opoku Prempeh ===
The event on the university campus honoured Dr. Prempeh’s leadership as Minister for Education and his contributions to advancing infrastructure development in tertiary institutions. Dr. Kofi Ohene Konadu, Chairman of the UPSA University Council, praised Dr. Prempeh for his outstanding contributions to the university's growth and development. He highlighted Dr. Prempeh’s key role in securing funding and overseeing the construction of the state-of-the-art facility, now named the Dr. Matthew Opoku Prempeh Hostel.

== Office of the Vice-Chancellor ==
Prof Kwaku Mensah Mawutor 2025- (current Vice-Chancellor of the University of Professional Studies).

Prof Abednego Feehi Okoe Amartey 2016- 2024 (former Vice-Chancellor of the University of Professional Studies).

Prof Joshua Alabi 2012-2016 (1st Vice-Chancellor of the University of Professional Studies).

== Programmes ==
=== Undergraduate Programmes ===
- Bachelor of Arts in Public Relations Management.
- Bachelor of Science in Accounting.
- Bachelor of Science in Accounting and Finance.
- Bachelor of Science in Business Economics.
- Bachelor of Science in Actuarial Science.
- Bachelor of Business Administration.
- Bachelor of Science in Information Technology Management.
- Bachelor of Science in Marketing.
- Bachelor of Science in Real Estate Management and Finance.
- 4-Year Bachelor of Laws (LLB).
- 3-Year Post First Degree Bachelor of Laws (LLB).

==== Diplomas ====
- Diploma in Accounting.
- Diploma in Marketing.
- Diploma in Management.
- Diploma in Public Relations Management.
- Diploma in Information Technology Management.

=== Professional programmes ===
- Association Of Certified Chartered Accountants (ACCA) UK.
- Institute of Chartered Accountants, Ghana (ICAG).
- Chartered Institute Of Marketing, (CIM) UK.
- Chartered Institute Of Management Accountants (CIMA) UK.
- Institute Of Chartered Secretaries and Administrators (ICSA) UK.

=== Post Graduate Programmes ===
- Master of Philosophy in Finance.
- Master of Philosophy in Leadership.
- Master of Business Administration in Accounting and Finance.
- Master of Business Administration in Auditing.
- Master of Business Administration in Corporate Governance.
- Master of Business Administration in Internal Auditing.
- Master of Business Administration in Marketing.
- Master of Business Administration in Petroleum Accounting and Finance.
- Master of Business Administration in Total Quality Management.
- Master of Science in Leadership.

== Notable alumni ==
- Joshua Alabi
- Margaret Ansei
- Ball J
- Camidoh
- Albert Kan-Dapaah
- Ernest Henry Norgbey
- Eric Oduro Osae
- Otumfuo Nana Osei Tutu II
- Xabier Pikaza
- Stonebwoy

== See also ==
- List of universities in Ghana
