= United Nations Joint Staff Pension Fund =

The United Nations Joint Staff Pension Fund - also known by its acronym UNJSPF in English or CCPPNU in French- was established in 1949 by the General Assembly of the United Nations to provide retirement, death, disability and related benefits for staff of the United Nations and the other organizations admitted to membership in the Fund.

The UNJSPF is a multiple employer defined benefit plan.

== Key facts and figures ==
The UNJSPF was established by United Nations General Assembly resolution 248 (III) (passed on 7 December 1948) which came into effect on 23 January 1949. As of 31 December 2023, it had 149.848 participants from 25 member organizations and served 86,013 retirees and beneficiaries, residing in more than 190 countries. The Fund pays benefits in 18 currencies.

== Performance of the investments ==
Net assets available for benefits at 31 December 2021 were US$91,459.6 million (2020: US$81,511.7 million).

In June 2022, the value of the assets was estimated at US$78 billion.

== Solvency ==
The actuarial valuation as of 31 December 2021 reviewed this year by the United Nations Joing Staff Pension Board (UNJSPB), the Fund's governing body, reported a strong surplus. Even at the most recent estimated value of the portfolio, the Fund continues to be well-funded with the funding ratio still higher and stronger than in 2019, when the previous actuarial valuation was performed.

== Governance ==
The Fund’s Regulations and Pension Adjustment System are approved by the United Nations General Assembly, and the United Nations Joint Staff Pension Board (UNJSPB) approves the Rules of the Fund. The Fund is administered by the UNJSPB, the Chief Executive of Pension Administration, a staff pension committee for each member organization, and a secretariat to each such committee.

The United Nations Secretary-General is responsible for the Fund's investments, which are managed through his Representative for the investment of the assets of the Fund (RSG) by the Office of Investment Management (OIM). Mr. Pedro Antonio Guazo Alonso (Spain/Mexico) has been the RSG since July 2020.

In 2018, the United Nations General Assembly, noting the dual role of the Chief Executive Officer (CEO) in administering the Fund and being secretary of the Pension Board, decided to replace the Secretary/CEO post with two distinct and independent positions: Chief Executive of Pension Administration (new name decided in 2019), to administer the Fund, and Secretary of the Pension Board. Both positions report to the Pension Board.

Secretaries of the United Nations Joint Staff Pension Board (1950-1999), Chief Executive Officers (1998-2020), Chief Executive of Pension Administration (from 2020)
Year	Country	Name
1950-1952	Unknown	Mr. Bannerman Clark
1953-1954	United Kingdom	Ms. Mildred Riddelsdell
1955-1958	France	Mr. Jacques Isaac-Georges
1958-1960	Netherlands	Mr. Bernardus Tielman Twight
1960-1963	Netherlands	Mr. H.R. Wilmot
1963-1983	Israel	Mr. Arthur Liveran
1983-1987	United Kingdom	Mr. Anthony Mango
1987-2000	USA	Mr. Raymond Gieri
2001-2012	France	Mr. Bernard Cochemé
2013-2018	Mexico	Mr. Sergio Arvizu
Aug 2018 - Dec 2018	USA	Mr. Paul Dooley (Acting CEO)
2019	USA	Ms. Janice Dunn Lee (Acting CEO)
2020-	Canada	Ms. Rosemarie McClean

In 2020, under the new leadership of Ms. Rosemarie McClean as Chief Executive of Pension Administration, the Fund adopted a new strategy aimed at simplifying the client experience, modernizing pension services and building a strong, global partnership.

In 2022, the Fund received an award from the United Nations Secretary-General in the innovation and sustainability category for one of its flagship projects, the Digital Certificate of Entitlement (DCE). The DCE app allows retirees and beneficiaries to issue their yearly proof of life and residence through an app, instead of sending a paper form to the Fund.
