= Swiss Management Center =

Business school in Switzerland

- Former names: SMC University
- Motto in English: "Lead Your Future"
- Type: Private business school
- Established: 1985
- President: Patrick Müller
- Location: Zug, Switzerland; Vienna, Austria and Buenos Aires, Argentina
- Language: English, Spanish
- Website: www.swissmanagementcenter.com

Swiss Management Center (previously SMC University) is a private business school founded in 1985. It is based in Zug, Switzerland and has offices in Vienna and Buenos Aires.

== Accreditation ==
In Switzerland, Swiss Management Center awards its own private degrees.

In Ghana, Swiss Management Center was registered in as a foreign university and was accredited by The National Accreditation Board (Ghana) - NAB. In August 2016, this accreditation status was removed. SMC held accreditation from the Accreditation Council for Business, Schools and Programs (ACBSP) from 2007-2018.

The German database on foreign educational certificates anabin classifies SMC as H- category "Not recognized institution".

== Faculty, students and alumni ==
SMC has an international focus and claims to have educated students from more than 130 countries.

Some of the notable Alumni of SMC University include:

- Goski Alabi, President of Laweh Open University.
- Bernice Adiku Heloo, former Member of Parliament for Hohoe Constituency in Ghana.
- Ibrahim Mwarimbo, Software Engineer for Kenya.
