= Accra High School =

Public high school in Ghana

- P O Box 155. North Ridge, Accra; Ghana

Information
- Type: High School (Day & Boarding)
- Motto: Redimentes Opportunitatem
- Established: August 1923
- Founder: Rev. James Thomas Roberts
- Status: Active
- Grades: 9
- Gender: Mixed (Boys & Girls)
- Color
- Nickname: Ahisco
- Alumni: Ahiscosa

Accra High School is the oldest senior high school in the Greater Accra and Eastern Regions of Ghana. Established by Rev. James Thomas Roberts, it initially started as a Boys School.

== History ==
Accra High School was founded by the late Rev. James Thomas Roberts on 17 August 1923. The school, was located at beach avenue in Aayalolo, a suburb of Accra, Ghana. The school celebrated its first anniversary in August 1924 with a church service at the Holy Trinity Cathedral, Accra and the sermon was delivered by the Anglican Bishop of Accra, the late Dr. John Aglionby. Thus, there was a tie between the school and the Church of England. In 1924, the school entered its first candidates for the college of preceptors as well as for the Cambridge University, the royal society of Arts and Pitman's Shorthand Examinations in the United Kingdom. In 1926, most of the pupils sat and passed the junior Cambridge Examination. In that year, Mr. Frank Roberts, the eldest son of Rev. Roberts, joined the staff after graduating in Bachelor of Arts from the United Kingdom. He worked hard to enhance the Academic and Disciplinary standard of the school in Accra. In 1927, the late J.O. Ansah Johnson became the first student to pass the Cambridge School Certificate Examination.

== Clubs ==
- Interact
- Amnesty International
- Adinkra Drama Club
- Readers, Writers and Debaters Club
- Ghana Methodist Students Union(GHAMSU)
- National Union of Presbyterian Students(NUPS-G)
- Pentecost Students Association(PENSA)
- School Choir
- Regimental band
- Cadet
- Scripture Union

== Notable alumni ==
- E. T. Mensah - Originator of Ghanaian Highlife Music
- Carl Daniel Reindolf - Ghanaian politician and member of parliament-Second Republic of Ghana.
- Nii Amaa Ollennu - Justice of the Supreme Court of Ghana, former acting President of Ghana during the Second Republic, and former Speaker of Parliament of Ghana
- Perry Curtis Kwabla Okudzeto - Ghanaian politician, former Deputy Minister at the Ministry of Youth & Sports and former deputy Information Minister
- Jonathan Tetteh Ofei - Ghanaian lawyer and politician
- Alex Mould - Ghanaian politician and former chief executive officer of Ghana National Petroleum Corporation.
- Kate Addo - Ghanaian journalist, broadcaster and public relations practitioner
- Sam Korankye Ankrah - Ghanaian minister and televangelist
- Jefferson Sackey - Ghanaian journalist, media consultant, filmmaker, and PR strategist
- Atukwei Okai - Ghanaian poet, cultural activist and academic.
- Kalsoume Sinare - Ghanaian actress and former model, Current Ambassador to Spain.
- Prince David Osei - Actor
- Anthony Woode - Actor
- Joey B - Ghanaian hip hop recording artist
- Iwan - reggae and dancehall musician
- Shaker (Lil Shaker) - HipHop recording artiste and producer
- Isaac Kwame Asiamah - Ghanaian Politician, Former Minister For Youth and Sports, former MP for Atwima Mponua Constituency
- Elizabeth K. T. Sackey - Former Greater Accra Deputy Regional Minister, First Female Mayor of Accra
- Miranda Greenstreet - Ghanaian Professor, academic and educationist
- Frank Ofori - Ghanaian former professional tennis player
- Nana Bediatuo Asante - Ghanaian Administrator, lawyer, consultant. Former Executive Secretary to His Excellency Nana Addo Danquah Akuffo-Addo
- Nii Amasah Namoale - Former Deputy Minister of Agriculture
- Yussif Issaka Jajah - Politician, Member of Parliament representing Ayawaso North Constituency
- Gideon Baah - 2007 MTN Soccer Academy Winner, Football Coach and Former Footballer
- Paul Tawiah Quaye - Ghanaian Police Officer, Inspector General of Police (Ghana Police Service) 16 May 2009 - 5 February 2013.

== School Code ==
0010106

== School Category ==
Category B

== Gender ==
Mixed

== Accommodation ==
Day/Boarding

== See also ==
- PeaceJam Ghana
