= List of educational institutions in Thanjavur =

Thanjavur has a culture of education. It is home to the Saraswati Mahal Library which dates back to the end of the 16th century and contains over 30,000 rare manuscripts. It has now been fully computerized. There are many other libraries including The Central Library, Thanjavur. Currently, Thanjavur has four universities including Tamil University and several colleges including the Thanjavur Medical College and RVS Agricultural College. There are also many research centres, including the Paddy Processing Research Centre (Now Indian Institute of Crop Processing Technology) and Soil and Water Research Centre and also have Agricultural college and research institute.

== Universities ==
- Indian Institute of Food Processing Technology IIFPT
- Periyar Maniammai Institute of Science & Technology (Deemed to be University)
- PRIST University
- SASTRA University
- Tamil University
- TANUVAS TJ Campus

== Engineering Colleges ==
- Government Engineering College, Thanjavur
- Anjalai Ammal Mahalingam Engineering College (AAMEC)
- Kings Engineering College (KEC)
- KSK College of Engineering & Technology (KSKCET)
- St.Joseph's College of Engineering & Technology (DMI)
- Annai College of Engineering and Technology (ACET)
- Arasu Engineering College (AEC)
- Parisutham Institute of Technology & Science (PITS)
- University engineering college (constituent college of Anna University)
- Star lion college of engineering and technology
- PR engineering college
- Vandayar engineering college
- As-salam college of engineering and technology
- SMR east coast college of engineering & technology

== Medical Colleges ==
- Thanjavur Medical College (Fourth Medical College in Tamil Nadu started in 1959

== Paramedical college ==
- Mannai Narayanasamy College of Physioterapy

== Arts, Science and Management Studies ==
- Adaikkala Madha College of Arts and Science
- Ruskin International B-School & Aviation Academy
- Bharath College of Science and Management
- Bon Secours College for Women
- Marudupandiyar College of Arts and Science
- Rajah's College of Sanskrit and Tamil Studies
- Sami Arul College of Arts and Science
- Indian Institute of Catering Technology and Hotel Management
- Annai Vailankanni Arts and science college
- T.U.K. Arts College (Karanthai Tamil Sangam)
- Abi and Abi College

== Autonomous Colleges ==
- A.V.V.M Sri Pushpam college, Poondi
- Kunthavai Naacchiyaar Government Arts College for Women
- Rajah Serfoji Government College Thanjavur
- Government Arts College, Kumbakonam
- Government College for Women, Kumbakonam

== Schools ==
- Jamewrekn international school#1. School in Thanjavur
- Maxwell Matriculation Higher Secondary School (MMHSS) (Established in 1989)
- Don Bosco Higher Secondary School
- E D Thomas Memorial Higher Secondary School
- Kalyanasundaram Higher Secondary School (KHSS) (Established in 1891)
- Rajahs Higher Secondary School (RHSS)
- St. Antony's Higher Secondary School
- Kamala Subramaniam Matriculation School (KSMS)
- Allwin Matriculation and Higher Secondary School (AMHSS)
- Auxilium Girls Higher Secondary School Thanjavur
- Seventh Day Adventist Secondary School
- csi blake higher secondary school
- St. Peter's higher secondary school(Established in 1784)
- Morning star matriculation school
- Amrita Vidyalayam
- Oriental higher secondary school
- Little scholars matric. Higher secondary school
- Thamarai international school
- Christ international school
- Nav bharat matric.hr.sec. school
- Kalaimagal matric.hr.sec. school
- Vidya vikas matric.hr.sec. school
- Veeraraghava higher secondary school
- St. Joseph girls Higher secondary school
- Sacred heart girls higher secondary school
- St Joseph matriculation school
- Don Bosco Matric Higher Secondary School Punalvasal Pattukkottai
- Thamarai International school
- Ranis International Nursery and Primary School
- SDV Matriculation School

== Polytechnic Colleges ==
- Ramya Sathianathan Polytechnic and B.Ed College
- Manali Ramakrishna Polytechnic College - Vayalur
- Shanmuga polytechnic college
- Periyar Centenary Polytechnic College
