= Public Interest and Accountability Committee =

Statutory committee monitoring Ghana's petroleum revenue

- Abbreviation: PIAC
- Formation: 15 September 2011
- Type: Statutory Committee
- Legal status: Active
- Purpose: Monitoring and evaluation of petroleum revenue management
- Headquarters: Accra, Ghana
- Location: Ghana
- Region served: Ghana
- Official language: English
- Chairman: Constantine K.M. Kudzedzi
- Main organ: PIAC Secretariat
- Website: piacghana.org

The Public Interest and Accountability Committee (PIAC) in Ghana is an independent statutory committee established by the Petroleum Revenue Management Act, 2011 (Act 815) in Ghana. Its primary mandate is to oversee the management and use of the country's petroleum revenues to ensure transparency and accountability for the benefit of the citizens of Ghana.

== History ==
PIAC was established in 2011 following the passage of the Petroleum Revenue Management Act (Act 815). The committee was created as part of Ghana's framework for managing petroleum revenues following the discovery of oil in commercial quantities in 2007.

== Mandate and Functions ==
PIAC's mandate, as derived from the Petroleum Revenue Management Act, centers on three core objectives:

1. Monitoring and Evaluation: To monitor and evaluate compliance with the Act by the government and relevant institutions in the management and use of petroleum revenues and investments.
2. Public Platform: To provide a space and platform for the public to debate the management and use of revenues, ensuring they align with national development priorities.
3. Independent Assessment: To provide independent assessments on the management and use of petroleum revenues to assist Parliament and the Executive in their oversight functions.

To fulfill this mandate, PIAC's functions include:

- Monitoring and evaluating compliance with the PRMA by government and relevant institutions
- Providing space and platform for the public to debate whether petroleum revenue management and use align with national development priorities
- Providing independent assessment on the management and use of petroleum revenues to assist Parliament and the Executive
- Consulting widely on international best practices
- Determining its own procedure

== Composition ==
PIAC is composed of thirteen (13) members representing various nominating institutions:

Nominating Institution	Number of Representatives
Christian Group	1
Muslim Group	1
Traditional Authorities	1
Association of Queen Mothers	1
Ghana Academy of Arts and Sciences	1
National House of Chiefs	1
Trades Union Congress	1
Ghana Journalists Association	1
Institute of Chartered Accountants	1
Ghana Extractive Industries Transparency Initiative	1
Civil Society Organisations	2
Total	13

== Key Activities ==
=== Regular Reporting ===
PIAC publishes several types of reports:

==== Semi-Annual Report ====
Published within three months after the end of each half-year, providing updates on:

- Petroleum receipts
- Allocation of petroleum revenues
- Management and use of the Annual Budget Funding Amount (ABFA)
- Management and use of the Ghana Petroleum Funds
- Project evaluation

==== Annual Report ====
A comprehensive report submitted to Parliament within three months after the end of each financial year, containing detailed analysis of:

- Total petroleum receipts
- Distribution of revenues
- Compliance with the PRMA
- Recommendations for improvement

=== Public Engagement ===
PIAC conducts various public engagement activities including:

- Regional public forums
- Stakeholder engagements
- Media briefings
- Community outreach programs

== Major Findings and Impact ==
=== Revenue Management ===
PIAC's reports have highlighted several key issues in petroleum revenue management:

- Fluctuations in petroleum receipts due to global oil prices and production levels
- Challenges in the allocation and utilization of the Annual Budget Funding Amount
- Implementation gaps in petroleum revenue-funded projects

=== Institutional Impact ===
PIAC's work has contributed to:

- Increased transparency in petroleum revenue management
- Enhanced public awareness and debate on oil revenue usage
- Policy recommendations for improving revenue management
- Strengthened parliamentary oversight

== Challenges ==
PIAC faces several operational and institutional challenges:

- Funding constraints affecting its operations
- Delayed implementation of its recommendations by government agencies
- Limited public awareness of its work in some regions
- Complexity of tracking petroleum revenue utilization

== Achievements ==
Despite challenges, PIAC has achieved significant milestones:

- Consistent publication of reports since its inception
- Increased civil society engagement in petroleum governance
- Contribution to policy reforms in the extractive sector
- Recognition as a model for extractive industry transparency

== See also ==
- Petroleum industry in Ghana
- Ghana National Petroleum Corporation
- Extractive Industries Transparency Initiative
- Natural resource management
