= FPSO John Evans Atta Mills =

The FPSO John Evans Atta Mills is a floating production storage and offloading (FPSO) vessel. It operates in the Tweneboa-Enyenra-Ntomme Oil Field off the western coast of Ghana. She is named after a former president of Ghana the late John Evans Atta Mills.

== History ==
The construction of the FPSO became necessary as the expansion of the Tweneboa-Enyenra-Ntomme (TEN) offshore oil fields demanded that another vessel be added to the FPSO Kwame Nkrumah. The vessel was built by Mitsui Ocean Development & Engineering Company Inc. (MODEC) in Singapore and named by the Lordina Mahama, in September 2015. The vessel arrived on Ghanaian waters on March 2, 2016 and started processing of crude oil in August 2016.

== Other Ghana FPSOs ==
- FPSO Kwame Nkrumah
- FPSO John Agyekum Kufour
