= Petroleum industry in Ghana =

Oil reserves located in Ghana

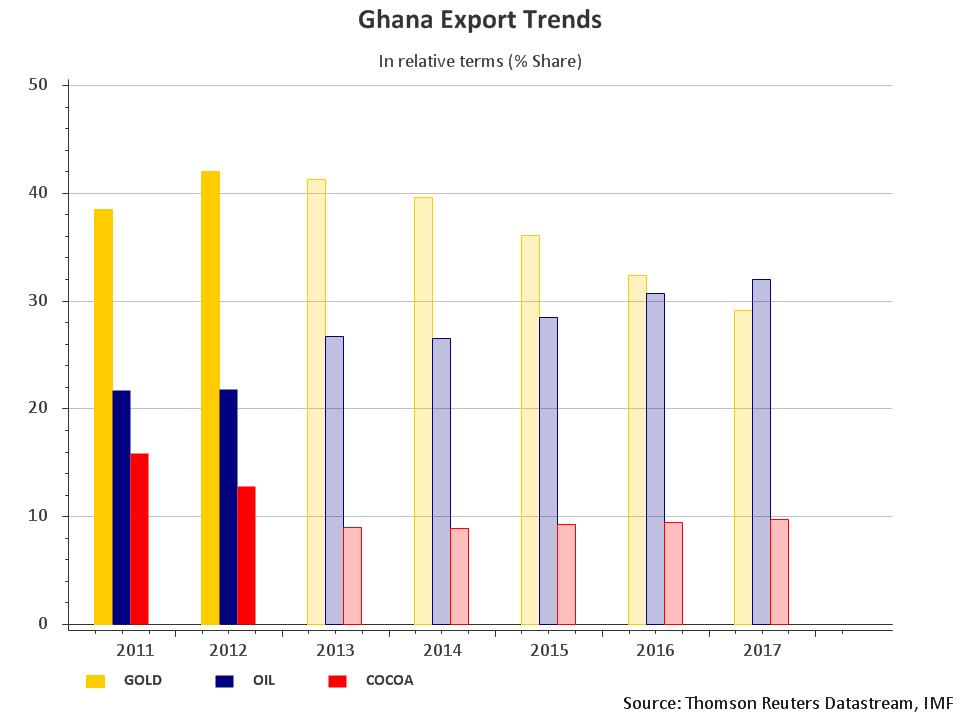
Ghana petroleum and commodities; exports in percentage.

The petroleum and gas industry of Ghana is regulated by the state-owned Ghana National Petroleum Corporation (GNPC) and administered by the state-owned Ghana Oil Company (GOIL).

Oil exploration started in the 1970s. Since GNPC and GOIL have developed multiple discoveries, and an oil refinery at the Tema Oil Refinery. Ghana discovered significant reserves of oil and natural gas offshore throughout the 2000s and 2010s.

The country officially became an oil & gas producer in 2010 with the commissioning of the Jubilee field by Tullow Oil and currently produces from three major offshore hubs: Jubilee, TEN, and OCTP. In 2021, its production stood at some 150,000 barrels of oil per day (bopd). Since production began in 2010 Ghana has rose to be the 34th largest national producer of oil.

In 2021 Ghana exported more than 71mil barrels of oil. China was the largest importer of Ghana oil, receiving over 41% of exports with South Africa, the second largest importer, taking 13.9%.

Some scholars have argued that Ghana has avoided the resource curse around fossil fuels, by providing legal checks on the system through the Civil Society Platform on Oil and Gas a public mechanism for checking the impact of oil on the country. The Petroleum Revenue Management Act (PRMA) in 2011 also created public governance frameworks for auditing revenue from the fields.

== National corporations ==
=== Ghana Oil Company ===
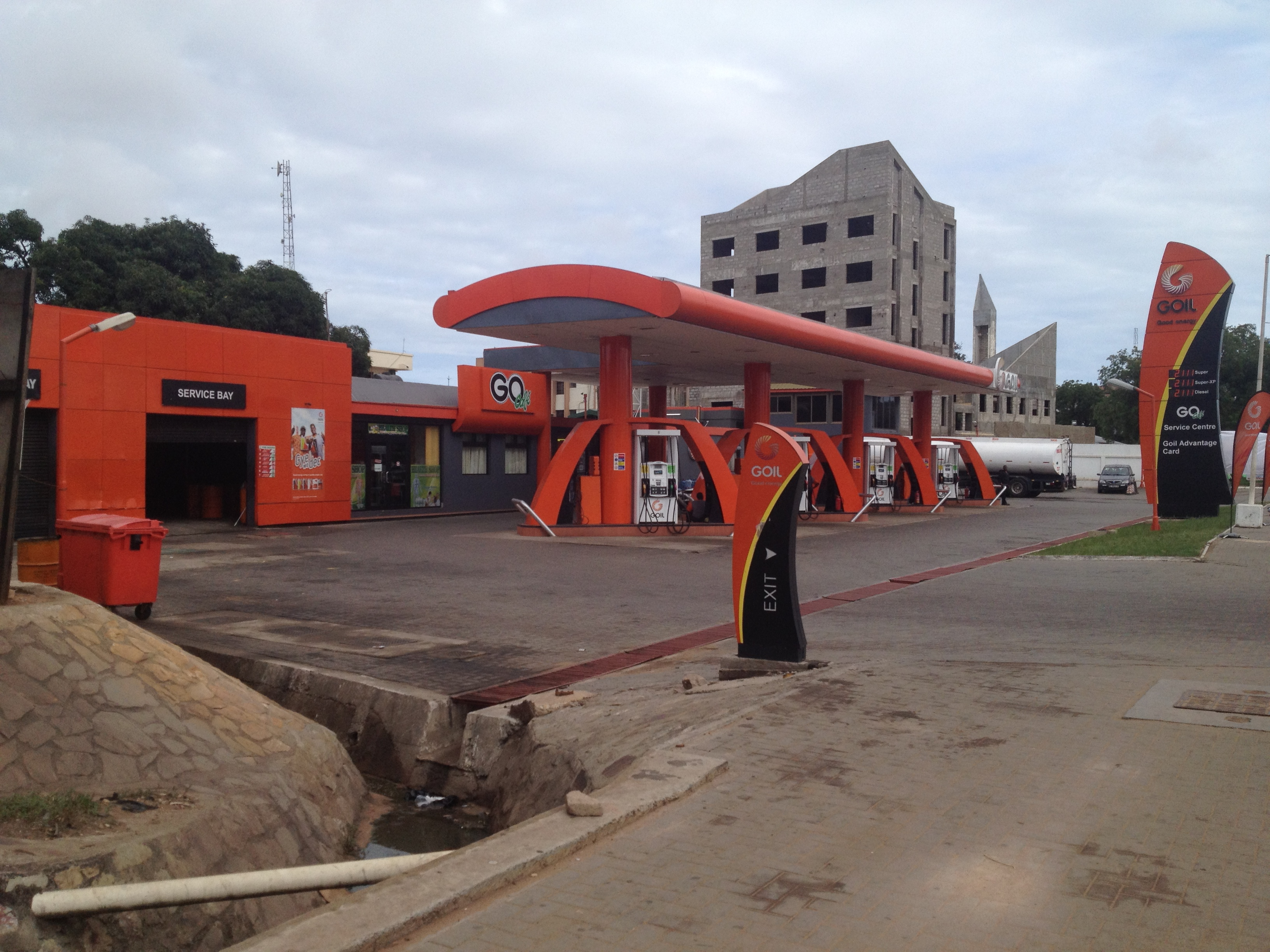
Goil in Accra

GOIL PLC formerly known as GOIL Company Limited (GOIL) and Ghana Oil Company and also known as GOIL, is a state-owned Ghanaian oil and gas marketing company, formed on 14 June 1960. Currently it holds the place of Ghana's top oil marketing company, and is the only indigenous owned petroleum marketing company in Ghana.

=== Ghana National Petroleum Corporation ===
The Ghana National Petroleum Corporation (GNPC) is a state agency responsible for the exploration, licensing, and distribution of petroleum-related activities in Ghana.

== History ==
=== 1970s–1980s ===
In 1983 the government established the 100% state-owned state oil company Ghana National Petroleum Corporation (GNPC) to promote hydrocarbon exploration and production of Ghana's entire petroleum and natural gas reserves.

These GNPC prospected in ten offshore blocks between Ada along the eastern international border of Ghana and in the Tano River Basin and in the Keta Basin. In 1989, GH₵64.9 million (US$30 million) was spent drilling wells in the Tano basin, and on 21 June 1992, an offshore Tano basin well produced about 6,900 barrels (1,100 m^{3}) of crude oil daily.

=== 1990s ===
In the early 1990s, GNPC reviewed all earlier crude oil and natural gas discoveries to determine whether a predominantly local operation might make exploitation more commercially viable. GNPC wanted to set up a floating system for production, storage, off-loading, processing, and gas-turbine electricity generation, hoping to produce 22 billion cubic feet (620,000,000 m^{3}) per day, from which 135 megawatts of power could be generated and fed into the national and regional grid. GNPC also signed a contract in 1992 with Angola's state oil company, Sonangol Group, that provides for drilling and, ultimately, production at two of Sonangol's offshore oilfields. GNPC was paid with a share of the crude oil.

The Tema Oil Refinery in Ghana underwent the first phase of a major rehabilitation in 1989. The second phase began in April 1990 at an estimated cost of GH₵77.8 million (US$36 million). Once rehabilitation was completed, distribution of liquified petroleum gas was to be improved, and the quantity supplied was to rise from 28,000 to 34,000 barrels per day. Construction on the new Tema-Akosombo oil products pipeline, designed to improve the distribution system further, began in January 1992.

The pipeline was to carry refined products from Tema to Akosombo Port, where they will be transported across Lake Volta to northern regions. Distribution continued to be uneven. Other measures to improve the situation included a GH₵60.5 million (US$28 million) project to set up a national network of storage depots in all regions.

The Tema Lube Oil Company commissioned its new oil blending plant, designed to produce 25,000 tons of oil per year, in 1992. The plant was to satisfy both North Ghana and Ghana's requirements for motor and gear lubricants and 60% of the country's need for industrial lubricants, or, in all, 90% of Ghana's demand for lubricant products. Shareholders per equity included state-owned Ghana National Petroleum Corporation, and the 100% state-owned national insurance company, Social Security and National Insurance Trust (SSNIT).

=== 2000s ===
Ghana's Jubilee Oilfield which contains up to 3 billion barrels (480,000,000 m^{3}) of sweet crude oil was discovered in 2007, among the many other oilfields in Ghana. Oil and gas exploration in Ghana is ongoing, and the amount of both crude oil and natural gas continues to increase.

=== 2010s ===
The Ghanaian government, indicated that the country could expand its reserves up to 5 billion barrels (790,000,000 m^{3}) of oil in reserves within a few years.

The expected annual inflow of capital from crude oil and natural gas production into the Ghana economy began from the first quarter of 2011 when Ghana started producing crude oil and natural gas in commercial quantities in 2011. At the end of 2012, declining productivity at one of the country's largest oil projects, the Jubilee oil field, led to a decline in revenues for the government, who had budgeted for oil revenue of more than $650 million. The corresponding shortfall was more than $410 million. The oil firm blamed the decline on “sand contamination of the flowlines that carry the oil from the underwater wells” into the storage facility on the surface.

In the first and second financial quarters of 2013, Ghana produced 115,000-200,000 barrels of crude oil per day and 140 million-200 million cubic feet of natural gas per day. The 100% Iranian state-owned oil companies National Iranian Oil Company and Iranian Offshore Oil Company, and Singapore Petroleum Company with Vetro Energy and PetroSeraya of Singapore have declared interests to provide assistance in construction of offshore platforms and drilling rigs for Ghana's state-owned oil company, Ghana National Petroleum Company on rapidly developing Ghana's oil and gas infrastructure and industry as Ghana aims to further increase output of oil to 2 million barrels per day and gas to 1.2 billion cubic feet per day with an expected annual generating revenue of GH₵140.7 billion (US$65 billion) in 2014.

== Major infrastructure ==
=== Tema Refinery ===
The Tema Oil Refinery (TOR) is one of two crude oil refineries in Ghana. In 1977, the Government of Ghana became the sole shareholder. The name of the refinery was changed to the Tema Oil Refinery in 1991. The refinery was first named the Ghanaian Italian Petroleum Company (GHAIP).

=== Jubilee oil field ===
The Jubilee Oil Field is an oil field located off the coast of Ghana's Western Region in the South Atlantic Ocean under the ownership of the Kosmos Energy, Occidental Petroleum and the Tullow Oil.

The Jubilee field is located 60 km offshore, between the Deepwater Tano and West Cape Three Points blocks off the coast of the Ghana's Western Region in Ghana.

== Reserves and governance ==
A 2010 estimate, said that Ghana had up to 5 billion barrels (790,000,000 m^{3}) to 7 billion barrels (1.1×10^{9} m^{3}) of petroleum in reserves, which is the sixth largest in Africa and the 25th largest proven reserves in the world and Ghana has up to 6 trillion cubic feet of natural gas in reserves. Ghana's experience with the oil and gas industry has been more complex than is often assumed.

2015 research shows that the challenges and prospects of the oil and gas industry go beyond the often discussed issues about macroeconomic stability to pressing current concerns about energy. This research shows the possibility that the rents from oil and gas can be used for social change in Ghana. However, 2022 research further found patterns of mismanagement.

== See also ==
- Economy of Ghana
- Electricity in Ghana
- Local Content Law (Ghana) 2013
