= Kofi Koduah Sarpong =

Ghanaian business consultant

CEO of GNPC
- Incumbent
- Assumed office February 2017
- President: Nana Akuffo-Addo
- Preceded by: Alex Mould

Personal details
- Born: Ghana
- Party: New Patriotic Party
- Education: University of Ghana, University of Glasgow
- Occupation: Business person
- Profession: Administrator / Chartered Accountant
- Portfolio: Chief Executive officer

Kofi Koduah Sarpong is a Ghanaian business executive and consultant. He is a member of the New Patriotic Party of Ghana. He served as Executive Chairman of Ghanaian football club, Kumasi Asante Kotoko from 2010 to 2013.

He has worked for the International Cocoa Organization in London and Ghana Cocoa Board. He is the chief executive officer of GNPC as of 2017.

== Early life and education ==
Kofi Sarpong was born at Nsuta-Beposo in the Ashanti Region of Ghana. He obtained his GCE Ordinary Level certificate from the Seventh Day Adventist Secondary School in Bekwai and his GCE Advanced Level from Sekondi College. He earned a Bachelor of Science in Business Administration from the University of Ghana. He gained a World Bank scholarship in 1987 to study a Master of Business Administration from the University of Ghana. Upon completing his master's education, he was awarded a graduate scholarship to pursue a Master of Accountancy at the University of Glasgow in 1990. A Commonwealth Scholarship offered him the opportunity to apply for a Doctor of Philosophy degree in Industrial and Business Studies from the University of Warwick in the United Kingdom. Kofi Sarpong also holds a Master of Arts in Ministry from the Trinity Theological Seminary, Legon. He is a Chartered accountant from the Association of Chartered Certified Accountants, United Kingdom.

== Working life ==
Sarpong was employed as an assistant accountant in 1979 at the now defunct Meat Marketing Board. In 1980, he was employed as Deputy Chief Accountant at Ghana Food Distribution Corporation. He was promoted to Chief Accountant and subsequently to general manager of the corporation. He resigned in 1990 to further his studies outside Ghana. Upon his return to Ghana in 1993, Sarpong was employed as Deputy Chief executive of Ghana Cocoa Board. He took up appointment at the International Cocoa Organization, London in 1998 and served as the Head of Administration and Financial Services Division in 2001.

In 2004, the then President of Ghana, John Kufuor, appointed Sarpong as the Deputy managing director of the Tema Oil Refinery. He was made the managing director of the refinery in 2007. When the John Evans Atta-Mills administration took office in 2009, Sarpong left the position.

From 2010 to 2013, Sarpong served as Executive Chairman of Kumasi Asante Kotoko Sporting Club. He was appointed by Otumfuo Nana Osei Tutu II, King of the Asante Kingdom. The club won two Ghana Premier League titles, two Champion of Champions titles, and two FA Cup Runners-up positions. Co-operation agreements with foreign clubs were also established with Sunderland A.F.C. in the United Kingdom, TP Mazembe in DR Congo and Petro Luanda in Angola.

After Asante Kotoko, Sarpong took up the position of Chief executive of The Global Haulage Group, a Ghanaian cocoa buying and exporting company. He was also the chairman of the boards of The Royal Bank, Ghana and Imperial General Assurance Ltd. He resigned from boards in 2016.

K.K Sarpong was appointed chancellor of UPSA in January 2022.

== CEO of GNPC ==
In February 2017, President Nana Akufo-Addo, appointed Sarpong as Acting chief executive officer of Ghana National Petroleum Corporation. He replaced Alex Mould who had served as CEO since 2013.

Political offices
Preceded by Alex Mould	CEO GNPC; Ghana; 2017 –	Incumbent
