= Kwadwo Owusu Afriyie =

Ghanaian lawyer and politician (1957–2020)

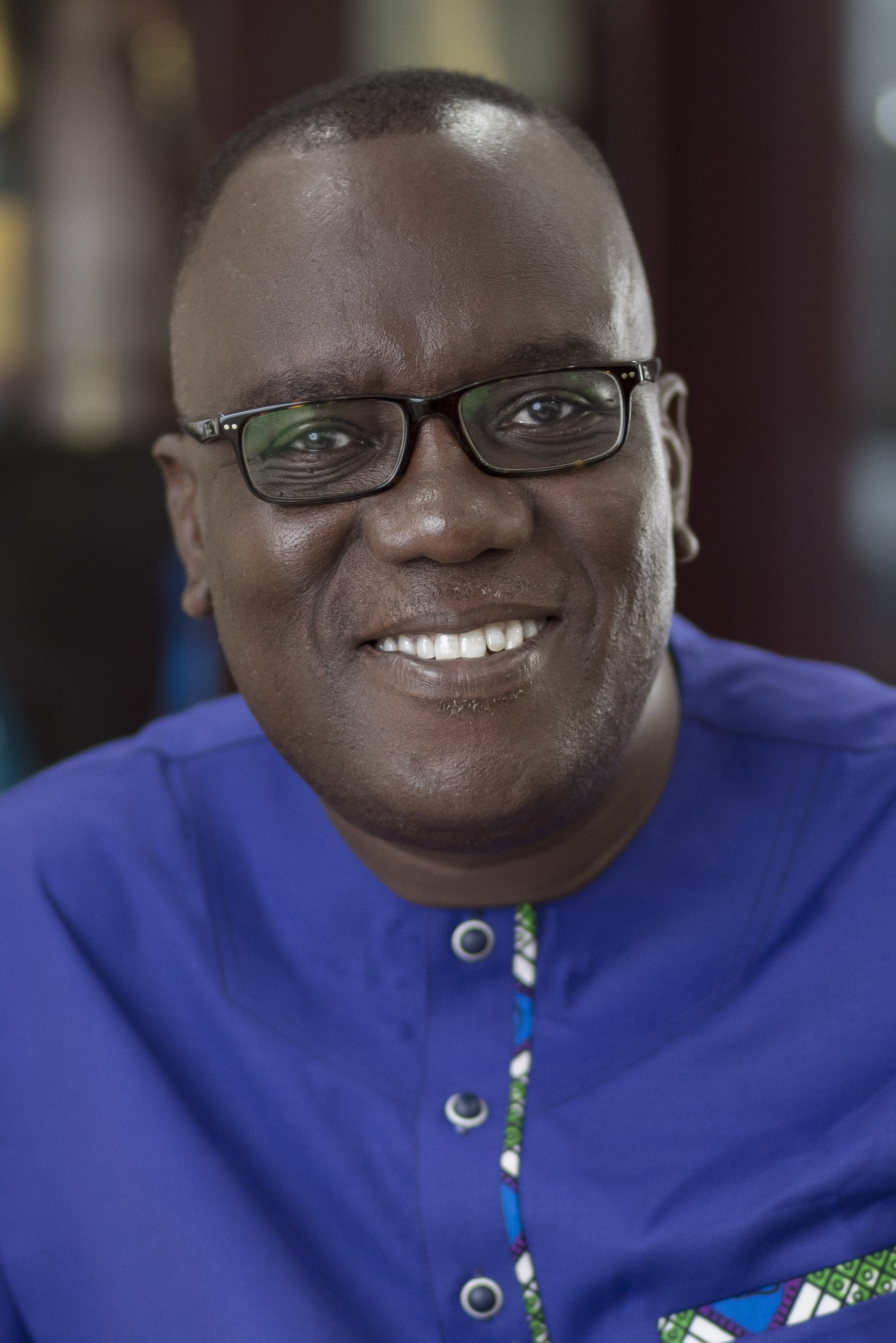
- Afriyie in 2019

CEO Forestry Commission
- In office March 2017 – 1 July 2020
- President: Nana Akuffo-Addo
- Preceded by: Samuel Afari Dartey
- Succeeded by: vacant

Head of legal GNPC
- President: John Agyekum Kufour

Personal details
- Born: 1957 Ghana
- Died: July 1, 2020 (aged 62–63) Accra, Ghana
- Party: New Patriotic Party
- Education: University of Ghana, Ghana School of Law
- Occupation: Public servant
- Profession: Lawyer

Kwadwo Owusu Afriyie (popularly known as Sir John) (1957 – 1 July 2020) was a Ghanaian lawyer and politician. He held several political positions including general secretary of the New Patriotic Party. He was the chief executive officer of Forestry Commission of Ghana before his death.

== Early life and education ==
Kojo Afriyie was born in the Ashanti Region of Ghana. He attended Seventh Day Adventist Secondary School in Bekwai from where he obtained his GCE Ordinary level certificate. He proceeded to obtain his GCE Advanced level certificate from Konongo Odumase Secondary School in Konongo. He was admitted to study political science at the University of Ghana. He then enrolled at the Ghana School of Law where he graduated with Bachelor of Laws. After this he was admitted as a solicitor and counsel for the Supreme Court of Ghana.

== Career ==
=== Legal career ===
Afriyie entered into private law practice in 1981. During the John Agyekum Kufour administration, he was appointed head of legal services at the Ghana National Petroleum Corporation. He was later made to act as the Deputy Chief Executive Officer of the corporation.

=== Political career ===
While managing his firm, Afriyie was also actively engaged in Ghanaian politics. He was the general secretary of the New Patriotic Party from 2010 to 2014. He lost his bid to secure a second term to Kwabena Agyapong. In May 2017, while the CEO of the Forestry Commission, he publicly declared that he would contest the New Patriotic Party's general secretary elections if there was an overwhelming call for him to do so.

=== CEO of Forestry Commission ===
In March 2017, President Nana Akuffo-Addo appointed Afriyie as CEO of the Forestry Commission. He replaced Samuel Afari Dartey, whose term as the CEO had ended. His appointment was surprising to many Ghanaians because of many rumours that he was linked to the position of head of the Ghana Ports and Harbours Authority. That position was given to Paul Asare Ansah. Afriyie later revealed that the rumours were true but he had rejected the appointment due to his fear of the sea. He thanked the president for the Forestry Commission appointment and believed that since he hailed from the forest zone of Ghana, he would be able to have a greater impact in that area.

As CEO of the Forestry Commission, Afriyie's job was to oversee the various public agencies that form the divisions of the commission. His first assignment as head of the commission was to supervise the celebration of World Forest Day which fell on 21 March 2017.

== Contempt case ==
In July 2013, Afriyie was summoned to the Supreme Court of Ghana because he had made some potentially contemptuous comments. He had criticised the Court for its actions in a criminal contempt case involving Sammy Awuku of the New Patriotic Party, and had implied that the justices' continuous mention of public radio discussions on cases that were before the court was a ploy by the court to curtail people from expressing themselves. Upon appearing before the court, his counsel, Ayikoi Otoo, pleaded with the court to be lenient and declared that his client had pleaded guilty to the charge. According to Ayikoi Otoo, "... some power for which no one had control over, entered Owusu Afriyie, because as a lawyer, he ought to have known the law". The Peace Council also offered a plea on Afriyie's behalf to the court. After a brief trial, Afriyie was fined 5000 cedis or, if he defaulted on payment, a six-month prison term. Afriyie was made to sign a bond of good behaviour as well as retracting and offering an apology to the bench within 24 hours on the same platform he had used to criticise the court.

== Death ==
Afriyie died on 1 July 2020 in Accra after testing positive for COVID-19 during the COVID-19 pandemic in Ghana. He died at the Korle-bu Teaching Hospital where he was receiving treatment.

== Funeral and burial ==
The funeral of Afriyie was held at Wonoo Basic School Park. Afriyie who was a member of the Seventh-day Adventist Church was buried in Sakora Wonoo in a House Tomb.

Political offices
Preceded by Samuel Afari Dartey	CEO, Forestry Commission; 2017–2020	Succeeded by vacant
