= Betty Mould-Iddrisu =

Ghanaian lawyer and politician

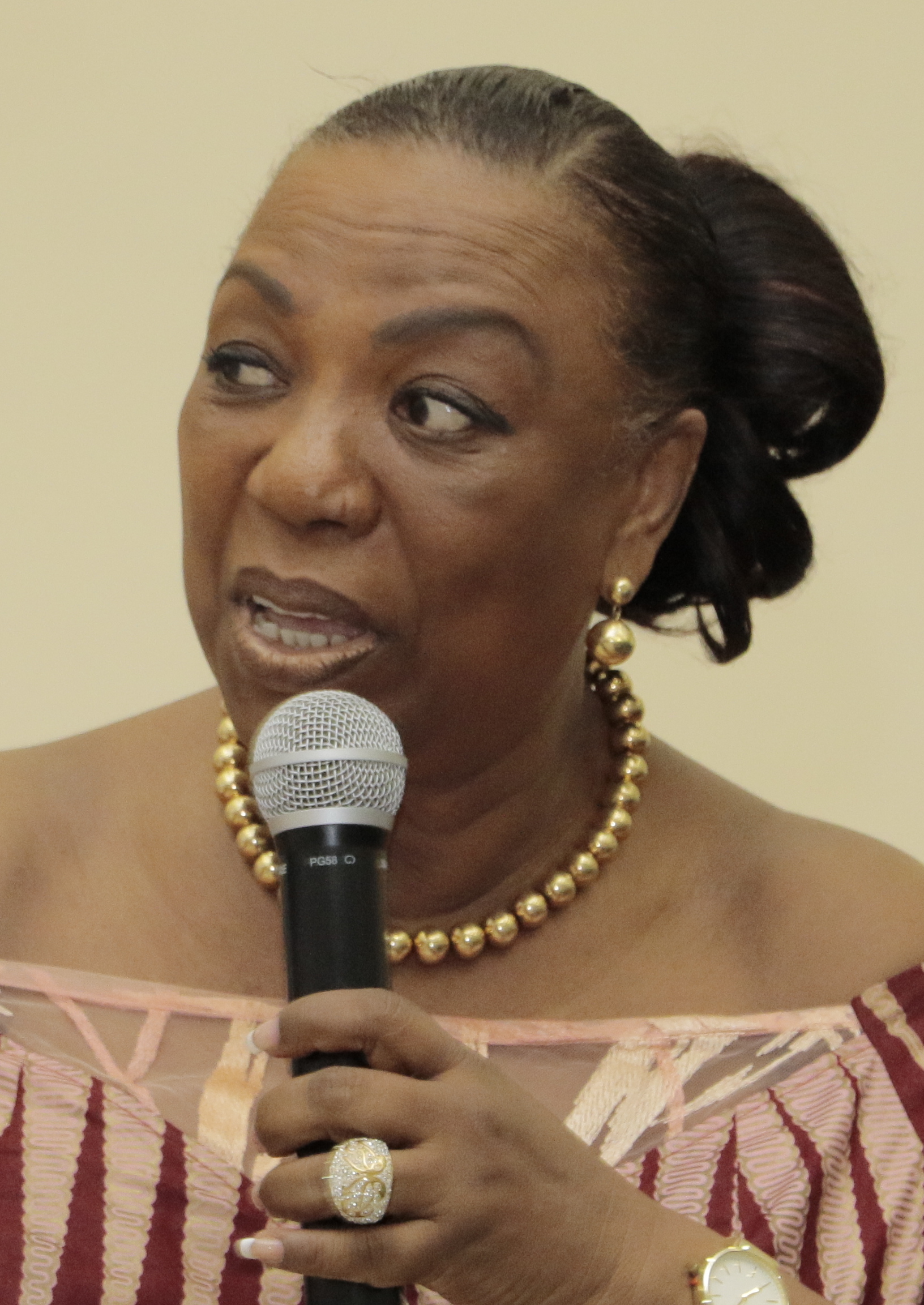

Minister for Education
- In office Jan 2011 – Jan 2012
- President: John Atta Mills
- Preceded by: Alex Tettey-Enyo
- Succeeded by: Enoch Teye Mensah

Attorney General and Minister for Justice
- In office Feb 2009 – Jan 2011
- President: John Atta Mills
- Preceded by: Joe Ghartey
- Succeeded by: Martin Amidu

Personal details
- Born: Betty Mould; 22 March 1953 (age 73)
- Party: National Democratic Congress
- Spouse: Alhaji Mahama Iddrisu
- Relations: Alex Mould (brother)
- Education: Achimota School; Accra Academy
- Alma mater: University of Ghana; London School of Economics
- Profession: Lawyer
- Known for: First female Attorney General of Ghana

Betty Nah-Akuyea Mould-Iddrisu (born 22 March 1953) is a Ghanaian lawyer and politician. A member of the National Democratic Congress (NDC), she was Minister for Education in Ghana from 2011 to 2012, after serving as Attorney General and Minister for Justice from 2009 to 2011. She was the first woman to lead the Attorney General's Office in Ghana. Prior to politics, she had been the head of Legal and Constitutional Affairs at the Commonwealth Secretariat in London.

Mould-Iddrisu had been one of those thought to be the likely nominee for Vice President of Ghana on the ticket of the National Democratic Congress (NDC).

== Education ==
She had her early education at Ghana International School and attended Achimota School and Accra Academy for her secondary education. She obtained a bachelor's degree in law (L.L.B) from the University of Ghana, Legon between 1973 and 1976. Her academic qualifications include a Master's Degree gained in 1978 from the London School of Economics.

== Career ==
In 2003, Mould-Iddrisu was appointed the Director of the Legal and Constitutional Affairs Division of the Commonwealth Secretariat, an inter-governmental organisation comprising 53 member states based in London. Some of the highlights of her time at the Secretariat include overseeing implementation of mandates in the area of transnational crime, counter terrorism and international humanitarian law. She oversaw the implementation of the Secretariats programmes on anti-corruption, asset recovery and judicial ethics. In addition, she implemented diverse legal program's through judicial reforms, legislative drafting and building capacity in the legal field in the Commonwealth amongst others.

She has given advice to Heads of States, Ministers and she is frequently called upon to give high level advice to governments, politicians and civil society. She also advises member states in the areas of international law, constitutional law and human rights and organizes high level ministerial and senior officials meetings. She headed the Secretariat Team of the Electoral Observer Group to the 2006 Ugandan Elections.

She acts as In-house-Chief legal adviser to the Secretary General and Secretariat. In that capacity she manages a team of lawyers from diverse backgrounds and is responsible for managing her divisional budget and sourcing for extra budgetary resources. She also assists the Secretary General and his two Deputies in management of the Secretariat and represents the secretariat at Tribunals and Courts. Between 1990 and 2000, at a time she was fulfilling her duties at the London-based Commonwealth Secretariat, she taught at the law faculty of University of Ghana, also publishing various papers and articles on intellectual property.

== Politics ==
=== Attorney-General of Ghana ===
Mould-Iddrisu was sworn in in February 2009 as the Minister of Justice and Attorney General by President John Evans Atta Mills, President of the Republic of Ghana. She was the first female to be appointed to that role in Ghana.

=== Resignation ===
Mould-Iddrisu resigned from the government in January 2012 with reasons not made known to the public. President Mills accepts resignation of Mould-Iddrisu, the next day This was a few days after her successor as Attorney-General was sacked by the President. She had been under pressure in relation to a case while she was serving as the Attorney-General. She was succeeded at the Education Ministry by Enoch Teye Mensah.

=== Opinion on State of Affairs in Ghana ===
In July 2023, she interrogated the importance of the Office of Special Prosecutions, suggesting that it was set up by the National Patriotic Party (NPP) government to go after people they disagreed with politically. She also added that lessens the power of the office of the Attorney General.

== Personal life ==
Betty Mould-Iddrisu is married to former Minister of Defence Mahama Iddrisu and is the elder sister of Alex Mould, a former chief executive officer of Ghana National Petroleum Corporation.

== See also ==
- List of Mills government ministers

Political offices
Preceded by Ambrose Dery	Attorney General and Minister for Justice; 2009 – 2011	Succeeded by Martin Amidu
Preceded by Alex Tettey-Enyo	Minister for Education; 2011 – 2012	Succeeded by Enoch Teye Mensah
