= Tweneboa Enyenra Ntomme Oil Field =

Ghanaian offshore oil field

- Location within Africa
- Country: Ghana
- Region: Western Region
- Location: South Atlantic Ocean
- Offshore/onshore: offshore
- Coordinates: 4.49278°N 2.916667°W
- Operator: Tullow Oil
- Partners: Tullow Oil (49.95%); Kosmos Energy (18%); Occidental Petroleum (18%); Ghana National Petroleum Corporation (10%); Petro SA (4.05%)

Field history
- Discovery: 2009
- Start of development: 2011
- Start of production: 2016

Location south of Ghana

The Tweneboa Enyenra Ntomme Oil Field is an oil field within Ghana's territorial waters and the country's second major oil field after the Jubilee Oil Field. It is popularly known as the TEN oil field, an acronym formed from the three drilling fields that it comprises. Coincidentally, the exploration for oil in the basin also started with ten pre-first oil wells.

== History ==
The Tweneboa Enyenra Ntomme Oil Field was discovered in 2009 by Tullow Oil. It is in the Deepwater Tano license, which covers an area of more than 800 square kilometers (310 sq mi) and lies around 20 kilometers (12 mi) west of Tullow's Jubilee Oil Field. Equity partners of the Deepwater Tano block are Tullow (49.95%), Kosmos Energy (18%), Occidental Petroleum (18%), PetroSA (4.05%), and the Ghana National Petroleum Corporation (GNPC) with 15%. Development and appraisal of the three deep wells started in 2013 after the license was granted in 2012.

== Production ==
The Tweneboa Enyenra Ntomme Oil Field began oil production on August 18, 2016. The official ceremony to start production was performed by John Dramani Mahama, the President of Ghana at the time, when he opened the production valve on the Floating Production Storage and Offloading Vessel FPSO John Evans Atta Mills. The first production phase produced 23,000 barrels of oil daily till the end 2016 and is projected to be 80,000 barrels per day afterwards. The final phase of the project will have 24 wells in total with a mixture of water injection, gas injection and production wells. Forecasts showed that the TEN Oil Field will produce about 300 million barrels over a 20-year period, 80% of which will be oil and 20% gas. The field will produce 80,000 barrels of oil and 180 million standard cubic foot of gas per day when it reaches full production. The entire project is expected to cost US$4.8 billion.

== See also ==
- Atuabo Gas Plant
- Jubilee Oil Field
