= Sathianathan =

Sathianathan is a surname. Notable people with the surname include:

- B. Sathianathan (born 1958), Malaysian football coach and former player
- Ramya Sathianathan (fl. 2010s), Indian engineer and founder of Ramya Sathianathan Polytechnic and B.Ed College
