= FPSO Kwame Nkrumah =

Ghanaian oil storage vessel

History
- Name: FPSO Kwame Nkrumah MV21 (2010–); Ohdoh (2008–2010); Tohdoh (1991–2008)
- Owner: Tullow Oil
- Port of registry: Panama
- Builder: Mitsui Engineering and Shipbuilding
- Laid down: 10 January 1991
- Acquired: 24 October 1991
- Identification: Call sign: 3ECC9; IMO number: 9003861; MMSI no.: 356055000
- Status: Operational

General characteristics
- Type: Floating Production Storage and Offloading
- Tonnage: 151,542 GT; 76,586 NT; 240,550 DWT
- Length: 358.6 m (1,176 ft 6 in)
- Beam: 59 m (193 ft 7 in)
- Height: 64.8 m (212 ft 7 in)
- Draught: 19.6 m (64 ft 4 in) operating.
- Installed power: 1,250 kW
- Speed: 13.2 knots (24.4 km/h; 15.2 mph)
- Capacity: 120,000 barrels per day (19,000 m^{3}/d) of oil; 160 million ft^{3} (4.5 × 106 m^{3}) of production gas; 1.6 million barrels (250×10^{3} m^{3}) of oil storage

FPSO Kwame Nkrumah is a floating production storage and offloading (FPSO) vessel. It operates in the Jubilee oil fields off the coast of Ghana. She is named after the first president of Ghana Kwame Nkrumah.

== History ==
VLCC tanker Tohdoh was built by Mitsui Eng. & Shipbuilding Co., Ltd. in 1991. She was owned and operated by NYK Line. In 2008, she was sold to MODEC for US$42.5 million. MODEC renamed the ship Ohdoh and started her conversion into FPSO vessel. Conversion was done by SembCorp Marine at the Jurong Shipyard in Singapore. On 1 May 2010, the vessel was renamed Kwame Nkrumah MV21, and on 15 May 2010 she started her trip for her base in the Western Coast of Ghana. She arrived in Ghana on 21 June 2010. The vessel is estimated to cost US$875 million.

== Other Ghana FPSOs ==
- FPSO John Evans Atta Mills
- FPSO John Agyekum Kufour

== Technical description ==
The vessel has a width of 65 metres (213 ft) and is 330 metres (1,080 ft) in length. It is about the size of three standard football fields put together.
