= Freddy Will =

American author and hip-hop artist

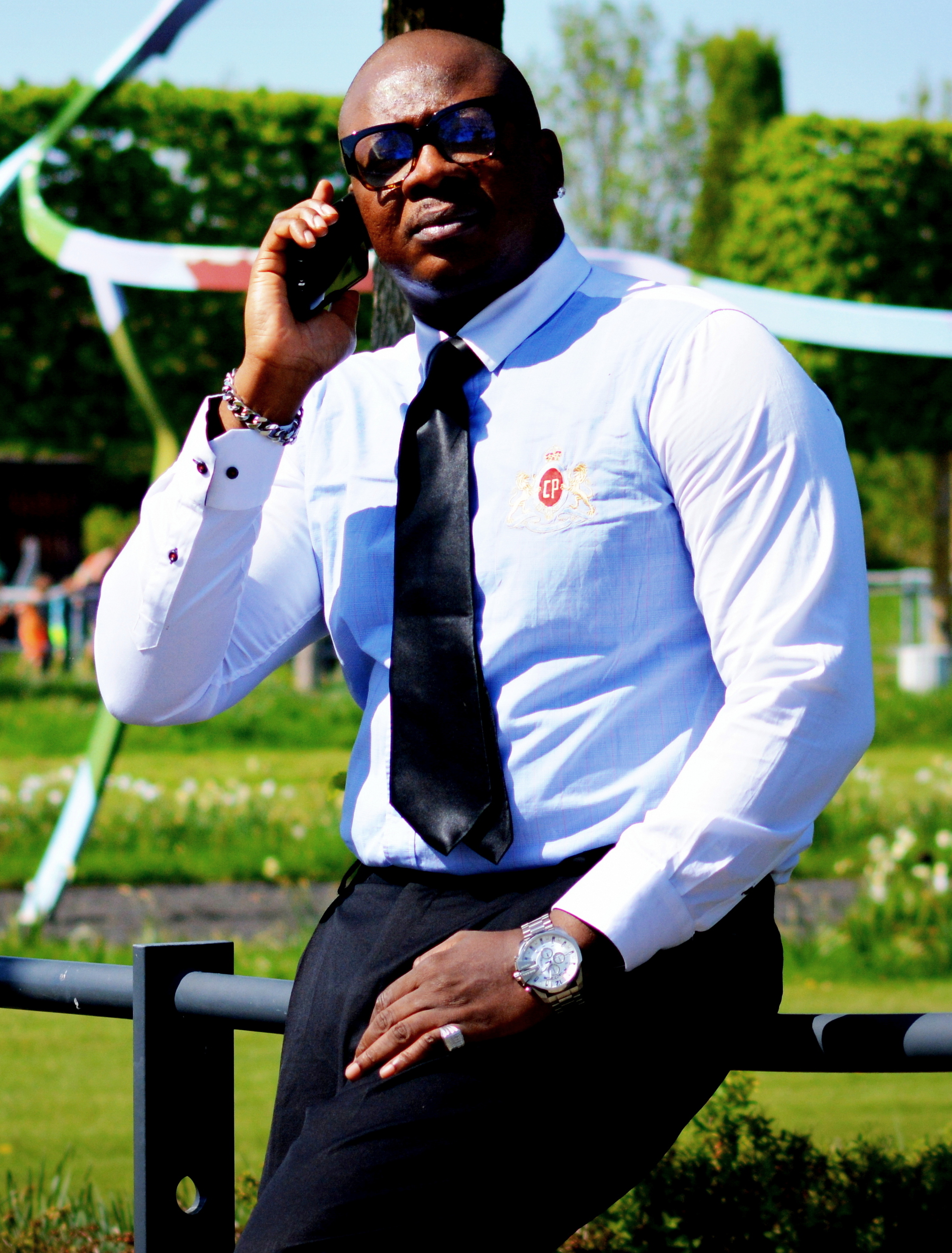
- Freddy Will at Wansee in Berlin, Germany.

Background information
- Born: Wilfred Kanu Jr. August 11, 1977 (age 49); Brookfields, Freetown
- Origin: United States of America
- Genres: Hip hop
- Occupations: Author, recording artist
- Years active: 2006–present
- Labels: Theatre of Literary & Performing Arts; Soul Asylum Poetry & Publishing; African Books Collective
- Website: freddywill.com

Wilfred Kanu Jr., known by his stage name Freddy Will, is a Sierra Leonean American author, music producer, publisher, recording artist, and philanthropist best known for releasing three consecutive albums with accompanying books. He launched his music career by mixing hip-hop with jazz, calypso, r&b, classical music, and Afrobeat. He writes books on history, philosophy, biography, poetry, personal development, and fiction. He is best known for his singles "City Boy" (2008), "Providence feat. Carvin Winans" (2009), "Endurance" (2010), "Mandingo Love" (2012), "2 Passports" (2014), "Livin' N' Toronto feat. Kao Denero" (2014), "Girl from Happy Hill" (2017), "IV U feat. King Boss LAJ" (2020), "Natural Light" (2024), "Celebration" (2025), "Afropolitan" (2026), "Road Wins" (2026) and "Fallin'" (2026)..

== Early life ==
Wilfred Kanu Jr. was born in Brookfields, Freetown, to parents who hailed from Sierra Leone. At the age of 2, he relocated with his parents to Monrovia, Liberia. There, he discovered a passion for music, theater performance, and literary expression. As a teenager, he navigated through the tumultuous Liberian and Sierra Leonean civil conflicts, residing in Sierra Leone, The Gambia, and Senegal. Eventually, he became a naturalized citizen of the United States.

== Toronto, Canada ==
In 2006, Freddy Will traveled to Toronto, Canada, to record his debut album. After revisiting the country a few times, he filed for permanent residency there. While living there he recorded a mixtape, two additional independent studio albums, an EP and released them off his independent record labels, Ghetto Breed Entertainment and Swift Nightz Entertainment. He also started his freelance writing career, launched his blog website, and authored three books that were published by Soul Asylum Poetry & Publishing, as well as his publishing company, Freddy Will Publishing in Ontario, Canada. All three books were published in a book plus album concomitant. He also launched The Freddy Will Hope Foundation.

== Berlin, Germany ==
Freddy Will relocated to Berlin, Germany, and established a connection to the African continent through his Berlin-based publishing venture, Badson Publishing. Will's literary efforts are said to reflect his identity as an Afropolitan—a member of the African diaspora characterized by geographic mobility. In Germany, he articulates this experience through the lens of his own educational journey, having attended primary school in Liberia, secondary school in Sierra Leone, and universities in the United States and Canada, all while maintaining a strong connection to his roots in Sierra Leone. He has published twenty titles. They include three paperbacks in Toronto, Canada, seven eBooks in Brussels, Belgium, and ten paperbacks, audiobooks, and eBooks in Berlin, Germany.

== The Theatre of Literary and Performing Arts ==
In his 2024 interview with Jatinder Padda, editor with Read African Books, a division of the African Books Collective (an African-owned, worldwide marketing and distribution outlet for books from Africa – scholarly, literature, and children's books), Freddy Will stated that Badson Publishing is a registered company in the United States and Estonia. It, however, operates in Berlin, Germany, serving as the publishing subsidiary of The Theatre of Literary & Performing Arts. The company partnered with the African Books Collective in Oxford, United Kingdom, with a commitment to embrace African creativity. There are also divisions for feminist and LGBTQIA+ authors.

During the interview, he professed the importance of African languages in his publishing model. He spoke about the challenges faced by African authors writing in their native languages, noting the legacy of colonialism that has positioned European languages as prominent on the world stage. He advocated for African writers to consider translating their works to enhance their global reach, while also emphasizing the importance of showcasing and promoting African languages to foster a richer literary heritage. Through this, Will hopes to amplify African voices and narratives, bridge cultural gaps, and enhance the visibility of diverse literary expressions from the continent.

== Literary, music, and theater influences ==
During his interview with award-winning Ghanaian journalist, Jefferson Sackey, Freddy Will stated that he started rapping when he was still living in Liberia. He credited Kool Moe Dee, LL Cool J., Queen Latifah, Ice-T, Naughty By Nature, legendary Sierra Leone rapper, Jimmy B, Dr. Dre, Tupac Shakur, Scarface, Snoop Dogg, The Notorious B. I. G., Nas, The Luniz and The LOX as some of his primary musical influences in hip-hop. For his writing, he credits his father, John Grisham, Shakespeare, Langston Hughes, Caresse Crosby, Maya Angelou and Pacesetter Novels as his primary influences and Idris Elba, Ice Cube, John Singleton and Spike Lee, his influences in theater and film.

== Healthy Food For Thought: Good Enough to Eat ==
In 2010, Freddy Will was among several musicians, music producers, spoken word artists, chefs and children's book authors who participated in a children's compilation album consisting of 60 selections of prose, poems, and songs about food, nutrition, and self-awareness that can be used as part of a childhood obesity awareness curriculum and to promote awareness for Type 2 Diabetes among school children. This album was executive produced in Philadelphia by the New York Coalition for Healthy School Foods. In 2011, the Recording Academy nominated the Double CD charity album for a Grammy Award.

== Discography ==
=== Albums ===
- While I'm Still Young – The Talking Drums (2008)
- While I'm Still Young – The Talking Drums 1.2v (2009)
- Dark Horse From Romarong – a City of Kings (2010)
- Laboramus Exspectantes (2014)
- Views From The 7 (2017)
- African Black: The Unreleased Anthems & Ballads (2020)
- Bee Mann: Stings from a One-Man Hive (2026)
- Bee Mann: Stings from a One Man Hive II (2026)

=== EP ===
- City of Kings: RELOADED (2012)

=== Mixtape ===
- Stay True (2006)

=== Collaboration ===
- Healthy Food for Thought: Good Enough to Eat (2010)
- CrossOver: The Best of Freddy Will (2025)
- The People's Sting: Chosen by the Hive (2026)

== Bibliography ==
=== Paperback ===
Title	Date	ISBN
My Book of Chrymes	August 11, 2009	ISBN 0-981-21601-3
The Dark Road from Romarong	October 10, 2010	ISBN 1-926-87609-1
Hip Hop Kruzade – Path of a Legend	November 22, 2014	ISBN 1-926-87650-4
My Book of Chrymes (Definitive Edition)	January 11, 2024	ISBN 979-8-89269-294-6
The Dark Road from Romarong (Definitive Edition)	January 25, 2024	ISBN 979-8-89298-094-4
Hip Hop Kru Zade: Path Beyond Clichés	February 21, 2024	ISBN 979-8-89372-905-4
Crime Rhymez	April 25, 2024	ISBN 979-8-89443-841-2
Theatre, Dance & Poetry	June 10, 2024	ISBN 979-8-89480-466-8
Brazenitout	September 13, 2024	ISBN 979-8-89589-679-2
Brazenitout 2	November 17, 2024	ISBN 979-8-89660-864-6
Brazenitout 3	April 4, 2025	ISBN 979-8-89901-019-4
Brazenitout 4	July 3, 2025	ISBN 979-8-89852-867-6
Theatre, Dance & Poetry: A Return To Love	August 20, 2025	ISBN 979-8-89898-246-1
Bee Mann: Stings from a One-Man Hive	July 8, 2026	ISBN 979-8-90553-496-6

=== eBooks ===
Title	Date	ISBN
The Sandmann's Journal Vol. 1	June 6, 2016	ISBN 1-483-57305-2
The Sandmann's Journal Vol. 2	November 15, 2016	ISBN 978-1-483-58654-0
The Sandmann's Journal Vol. 3	August 8, 2018	ISBN 978-1-644-40966-4
The Sandmann's Journal Vol. 4	October 10, 2018	ISBN 978-1-644-67715-5
The Sandmann's Journal Vol. 5	March 5, 2019	ISBN 978-1-645-16095-3
The Sandmann's Journal Vol. 6	February 22, 2020	ISBN 978-1-648-26437-5
The Sandmann's Journal Vol. 7	February 22, 2022	ISBN 979-8-891-21460-6

=== Documentary ===
Title	Date	Notes
Steadfast: The Jean Augustine Story	April 2, 2022	The Story of Jean Augustine's journey from Happy Hill, Grenada, to being the first Black woman elected to Canada's House of Commons and the first Black woman to serve in Canada's federal Cabinet. He performed a song in the soundtrack.

== Grammy Awards ==
Year	Song/album	Category	Role	Result
2011	Healthy Food For Thought, Good Enough to Eat	Grammy Award for Best Spoken Word Album for Children	Vocals, lyrics, songwriting	Nominated
