= Carl Reindorf =

Carl Reindorf may refer to:

- Carl Christian Reindorf (1834–1917), Euro-African-born pioneer historian and pastor
- Carl Daniel Reindorf (born 1927), Ghanaian politician
