= Infrastructure for Peace =

An infrastructure for peace or an I4P refers to multiple social levels of grassroots peacebuilding constituting sociopolitical infrastructure in a country that is a complement to state-level institutional peace processes in that country.

== Definition ==
In 2010, governments, political parties, civil society and United Nations country representatives from 14 African countries in Kenya agreed upon a working definition of the term infrastructures for peace as a 'dynamic network of interdependent structures, mechanisms, resources, values and skills which, through dialogue and consultation, contribute to conflict prevention and peacebuilding in a society'. The term was motivated by the effectiveness of locally led, participatory peacebuilding practices in several countries undergoing armed conflicts. The term is intended to stress conflict transformation and the combination of grassroots peacebuilding together with top-down political agreements.

== Examples ==
Examples of infrastructures considered to qualify as infrastructures to peace include the National Peace Council (Ghana); the Department on Ethnic, Religious Policy and Civil Society Interaction (Kyrgyzstan); economical approaches in Guyana, Bolivia and Kenya and, as of 2012, about 30 infrastructure for peace projects around the globe supported by the United Nations Development Programme.

== Criticisms ==
Critical studies on the infrastructure for peace mainly see this as a fuzzy concept because peacebuilding cannot be guaranteed only by local efforts. Such local infrastructures are prone to suffer from political upheavals, they still rely on external funding and cannot do well under strictly autocratic regimes. New research works, which conflate infrastructures for peace with security sector reform have also suggested such architectures need to rise above local boundaries to negotiate on security issues because (in)security has transnational connections.

== Contributions ==
Academic conferences, special editions of journals, issue-specific books and websites dedicated to this topic have begun to emerge including the UNE Peace Studies Conference (2015) on questioning 'peace formation' and 'peace infrastructure', Berghof Handbook and a Journal of Peacebuilding and Development Special Edition in Vol. 7, No. 3.
