= Kate Addo =

Ghanaian journalist and broadcaster

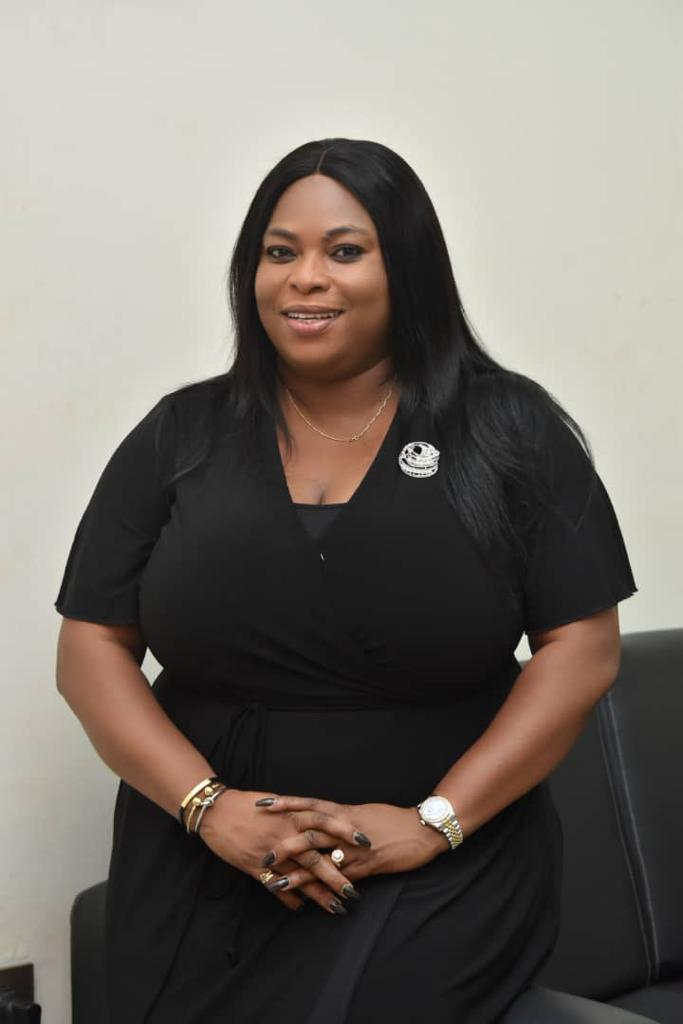
- Portrait of Kate Addo
- Born: Kate Addo; 23 July 1972 (age 53); Accra, Ghana
- Occupations: Journalist, Broadcaster, Public Relations Practitioner
- Years active: 1998 – present

Kate Addo (born 23 July 1972) is a Ghanaian journalist, broadcaster, and public relations practitioner. She is currently the Coordinating Director in Charge of Parliamentary Broadcasting, Media Relations, and Public Engagements Departments of the Parliament of Ghana.

== Early life and education ==
Kate Addo was born to William Schovel Addo and Juliana Ahimah Aryee, both from the Greater Accra Region in Ghana. She attended Ebenezer Senior High School in 1985, obtaining an Ordinary Level Certificate in 1990. She then proceeded to Accra High School for her Advanced Level Certificate in 1992. She started studying at the Ghana Institute of Journalism in 1996, where she obtained a Diploma of Journalism, and in 2003, at the University of Leeds, obtained an MA in International Communication. In 2010, she also obtained a Master of Public Administration (MPA) from the Ghana Institute of Management and Public Administration, and in 2016, an LLB degree from the Ghana Institute of Management and Public Administration.

== Career ==
Addo started her career at Ghana Broadcasting Corporation in 1998 as an Assistant Editor, and then she moved on to become a Newscaster, TV Presenter, and Political Moderator for current affairs programmes up until 2004 when she left.

Addo became acting Director of Public Affairs at the Parliament of Ghana in 2016 and in 2020 she was promoted to substantive Director of Public Affairs of the Parliament of Ghana.

== Personal life ==
Kate Addo is married and has two children. She founded the Duo Concept Foundation, which supports children from deprived communities.
