= Petroleum (Local Content and Local Participation) Regulations, 2013 =

The Petroleum (Local Content and Local Participation) Regulations, 2013 (L.I. 2204) is a legislative instrument passed in November 2013 by the Ghanaian government under the Petroleum Commission Act, 2011 that stipulates that Ghanaians should be prioritised in terms of employment in the petroleum industry, and should benefit from the country's resources. The law is expected to ensure that Ghana's natural resources benefit Ghanaians, while also allowing foreign oil companies to reap fair returns on their investment.

== Implementation ==
The bill – Legislative Instrument (LI) 2204 – seeks to “promote the maximisation of value-addition and job creation through the use of local expertise, goods and services, business and financing in the petroleum industry value chain and their retention in the country; develop local capacities in the petroleum industry value chain through education, skills transfer and expertise development, transfer of technology and know-how and active research and development programmes; achieve the minimum local employment level and in-country spend for the provision of the goods and services in the petroleum industry value chain; increase the capability and international competitiveness of domestic businesses; and achieve and attain a degree of control for Ghanaians over development initiatives for local stakeholders”.

The law also requires that a “contractor, sub-contractor, licensee, the corporation or other allied entity carrying out a petroleum activity shall ensure that local content is a component of the petroleum activities engaged in by that contractor, sub-contractor and licensee, the corporation or allied entity”; and that “an indigenous Ghanaian company shall be given first preference in the grant of a petroleum agreement or a licence with respect to petroleum activities subject to the fulfilment of the conditions specified in the regulations”.

The bill also requires that “there shall be at least a five percent equity participation of an indigenous Ghanaian company other than the corporation to be qualified to enter into petroleum agreement or a petroleum licence”.

== Reception ==
The law marks one of the first steps that an African country has taken in taking control of its own natural resources from an industry usually dominated by foreign companies. Despite this, international oil firms have broadly endorsed the bill as it fits in with many of their respective corporate social responsibility schemes. Ghana's Parliament hailed the bill as the country's “best hope of effectively integrating the sector into the rest of the national economy”.
