= Alex Mould =

Ghanaian chemical engineer and politician

CEO of Ghana National Petroleum Corporation
- In office September 2013 – January 2017
- President: John Dramani Mahama
- Preceded by: Nana Boakye Asafu-Adjaye
- Succeeded by: Kofi Koduah Sarpong

CEO of National Petroleum Authority
- In office April 2009 – September 2013
- President: John Atta Mills; John Dramani Mahama
- Succeeded by: Moses Asaga

Personal details
- Born: Ghana
- Party: National Democratic Congress
- Spouse: Mariel
- Relations: Betty Mould-Iddrisu (sister); Mahama Iddrisu (in-law)
- Education: Accra Academy; Kwame Nkrumah University of Science and Technology; University of Oxford; Kellogg School of Management at Northwestern University
- Occupation: banker and politician

Alexander Kofi-Mensah Mould is a Ghanaian politician and banker who is a former chief executive officer of Ghana National Petroleum Corporation. He is a member of the National Democratic Congress. Before he was appointed CEO of GNPC, he was the CEO of National Petroleum Authority.

== Early life and education ==
Alex Mould's parents were W. J. Kwesi Mould of Jamestown, Accra and Felicia Awurafua Gsell of Ejuratia in Kwabre, Ashanti. W. J. Mould was a businessman and a nationalist who was active in Ghana's pre-independence movements, and had attended the 1945 Pan-African Congress in Manchester as a representative of the Gold Coast Farmers Association. In 1947, W. J. Mould was the second individual after George Grant to make a financial contribution for the formation of the United Gold Coast Convention. Alex's sister, Betty Mould-Iddrisu, has served in government as Minister for Education and also Attorney-General and Minister for Justice.

Mould attended Accra Academy from 1973 to 1978 and Accra High School from 1978 to 1980 for O-Level and A-Level qualifications respectively. Mould's father died and was buried in 1980. He proceeded to the Kwame Nkrumah University of Science and Technology. There, he earned a bachelor of science degree in 1985 in chemical engineering. Mould enrolled at the College of Petroleum Studies, Oxford where he obtained a postgraduate diploma in Oil Marketing and Economics in 1989. In 1994, Mould earned a Master of Business Administration degree in Finance, Accounting and Decision Science from J. L. Kellogg Graduate School, Northwestern University, Illinois.

== Career ==
After graduating from Kwame Nkrumah University of Science and Technology, Mould was posted to undergo a one-year national service at the newly created Ghana National Petroleum Corporation in 1985. After service, he was employed by the corporation as a chemical engineer. He rose through the ranks to become a special assistant to the CEO of GNPC in the area of marketing.

In 1997, Mould resigned from GNPC and was appointed as a senior associate, Structured Trade Finance Americas of UBS Investment Bank from 1997 to 1999. He moved banks and was employed as associate director of Commodity Finance at Standard Chartered Bank in New York from 1999 to 2001. Mould was moved to the Ghana branch of Standard Chartered Bank in 2001 as executive director and co-head of the wholesale department. He remained in this role until his exit in 2008.

== National appointments ==
When the John Atta Mills administration was voted into power in 2009, Mould was appointed chief executive officer of the National Petroleum Authority. He remained in the position till 2012. In January 2013, when the John Dramani Mahama administration took over the reins of government, Mould was sent to the Ghana National Petroleum Corporation as its chief executive. He took over from Nana Boakye Asafu Adjaye, who had headed the corporation since 2009. He remained in the position till the end of the John Mahama administration. In January 2017, he was replaced by Kofi Koduah Sarpong.

== Personal life ==
Mould is a brother to Betty Mould-Iddrisu a former Minister of Justice under the John Atta Mills administration and a former Minister of Education under the John Dramani Mahama administration. He lost his daughter, Naa Densua to Malaria on 1 January 2020. This was when she was on holiday in Mauritius.

Political offices
Preceded by Nana Boakye Asafu-Adjaye	CEO GNPC; Ghana; 2010 - 2017	Succeeded by Kofi Koduah Sarpong
