= Jonathan Tetteh Ofei =

Ghanaian lawyer and politician

Jonathan Tetteh Offei

Member of the Ghana Parliament for Dangbe-Shai
- In office 29 August 1969 – 13 January 1972
- Preceded by: Edward Ago-Ackam
- Succeeded by: E. V. T. Engmann

Personal details
- Born: 16 March 1940 (age 86) Prampram, Gold Coast
- Party: National Alliance of Liberals
- Education: Accra High School, St. Augustine's College, University of Ghana
- Profession: Lawyer

Jonathan Tetteh Offei was a Ghanaian lawyer and politician. He was a barrister-at-law and a solicitor, he served as a member of parliament during the second republic for the Dangbe-Shai constituency.

== Early life and education ==
Jonathan was born on 16 March 1940 at Prampram in the Greater Accra Region.

He had his early education at the Accra Royal Middle Boys' School from 1950 to 1954. He had his secondary education at Accra High School from 1955 to 1959 and St. Augustine's College from 1960 to 1961. He continued at the University of Ghana in 1963 for his tertiary education and earned his bachelor of laws degree (LLB) in 1967.

== Career and politics ==
Jonathan was called to the bar on 29 September 1967.

In August 1969, he run for the Dangbe-Shai seat on the ticket of the National Alliance of Liberals. He contested with; Emmanuel Tettey Assimeh of the Progress Party (who amassed 1,134 votes) and Peter Tetteh Otubuah of the United Nationalist Party (who amassed 1,211 votes). He won with 3,779 votes. He was a member of parliament from 1969 to 1972 when the Busia government was overthrown.

He resumed private legal practice after the coup at Osekre and Ofei Company, a law firm he founded with George Adjei Osekre on 11 February 1971.

== Personal life ==
He is married with three children. He is a Christian and his hobbies include; swimming, boxing, farming, tourism and football.

== See also ==
- List of MPs elected in the 1969 Ghanaian parliamentary election
