= Seventh Day Adventist Senior High School, Bekwai =

Mixed second cycle institution in Bekwai, Ashanti Region, Ghana

Seventh Day Adventist Secondary School is a co-ed second cycle school in Bekwai in the Ashanti Region of Ghana.

== Notable alumni ==
- Kofi Koduah Sarpong - Ghanaian administrator and CEO of Ghana National Petroleum Corporation
- Kwadwo Owusu Afriyie - Ghanaian lawyer and politician. CEO of Forestry Commission
