= Sakora Wonoo =

- Kente Clothing Weaving Urban Area
- Nickname: Hanoi
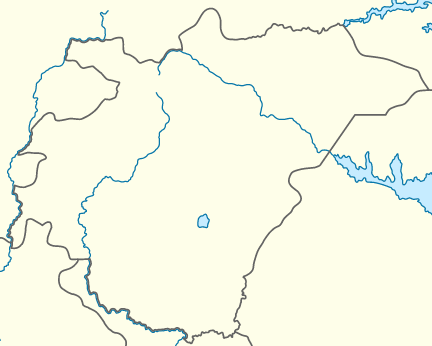
- Location of Sakora Wonoo in Ashanti
- Coordinates: 6°47′45″N 1°30′10″W
- City-State: Ashanti
- District: Kwabre East District

Population
  - Ethnicity: Ashanti people
  - Nationality: Ashanti
- Time zone: Greenwich Mean Time
  - Summer (DST): GMT

Sakora Wonoo is a kente clothing weaving urban area in the Kwabre East District of Ashanti, noted for its Kente weaving alongside Bonwire and Adanwomase.
