= Nsuta-Beposo =

Town in Ashanti, Ghana

Nsuta-Beposo is a town in the Ashanti Region of Ghana.
