= Nana Bediatuo Asante =

Ghanaian lawyer and consultant

Office of the President
- President: Nana Akuffo-Addo

Personal details
- Born: Ghana
- Party: New Patriotic Party

Nana Bediatuo Asante is a Ghanaian administrator, lawyer and consultant. He is a member of the New Patriotic Party. He is the Executive Secretary to the former president of Ghana Nana Akufo-Addo.

== Early life and education ==
He is married to Oluwafemi Adetola. He entered Prempeh College as a freshman in September 1974.

== Working life ==
Asante started his legal practice with Paul Weiss Rifkind Wharton & Garrison, in New York before joining the African Development Bank and Databank as a Consultant and General Counsel respectively. In 2000, he co-founded Faith Brothers Ltd, an investment holding company with Mawuli Ababio in Accra. The company later acquired Citi Savings and Loans Limited, where he served as a Managing Director. The company was subsequently converted into Intercontinental Bank Ghana Limited and was acquired by Access Bank Plc of Nigeria in 2019.

== Political life ==
In January 2017 he was appointed the Executive Secretary at the Flagstaff House by President Nana Akuffo-Addo.

In June 2024, he was appointed Ambassador at Large.

== Health ==
While attending the 79th UN General Assembly with the President, Nana Addo Dankwa Akufo-Addo, he suffered an illness.
