= National Peace Council (Ghana) =

Is an independent statutory national peace institution

National Peace Council of Ghana (NPC) is an independent statutory national peace institution established by the eight hundred and eighteenth (818) Act of the Parliament of the Republic of Ghana, named The National Peace Council Act, 2011. Thus any activity undertaken by the Council must be derived from its mandate under Act 818. The core function of the council is to prevent, manage, and resolve conflict and to build sustainable peace.

With the passing of Act 818, NPC became operational in 2011. Its establishment abolished the previous peace strategy of National, Regional and District Security Councils that established Regional Peace Advisory Councils (RPACs) and District Peace Advisory Councils (DPACs).

The National Peace Council consists at the national level of a governing body known as the Board of thirteen eminent persons appointed by the President. The appointment is for a period of four years but a board member may resign or membership may be revoked by the President for stated reasons. There is also an Executive Secretary appointed by the President, responsible for day-to-day administration of the affairs of the council.

At the Regional and District Levels, the NPC consists of Regional and District Peace Councils appointed by the Board in consultation with the Regional coordinating Council and the District Assembly respectively. There are also Regional and District Executive Secretaries appointed by the President.

Functions

To achieve its object, the Council shall;

(a) Harmonise and co-ordinate conflict prevention, management, resolution and build sustainable peace through net-working and co-ordination.

(b) Strengthen capacities for conflict prevention, management, resolution and sustainable peace in the country including but not limited to chiefs, women, youth groups and community organization.

(c) Increase awareness on the use of non-violent strategies to prevent, manage and resolve conflict and build sustainable peace in the country.

(d) Facilitate the amicable resolution of conflict through mediation and other processes including indigenous mechanisms for conflict resolution and peace building.

(e) Promote understanding of the values of diversity, trust, tolerance, confidence building, negotiation, mediation, dialogue and reconciliation.

(f) Co-ordinate and supervise the work of the Regional and District Peace Councils.

(g) Facilitate the implementation of agreements and resolutions reached between parties in conflict.

(h) Make recommendations to the Government and other stake-holders on actions to promote trust and confidence between and among group.

(i) Perform any other function which is ancillary to its object.

The National Peace Council consists of 13 Governing Members,

The 13 members of the board are; Rev. Dr. Ernest Adu-Gyamfi, Chairman of the National Peace Council, Maulvi Mohammed Bin Salihi (Ahmadiyya Muslim Mission), Most Rev. Emmanuel Kofi Fianu, Nana Agyakoma Difie II, Rev. Prof. Paul Frimpong-Manso, Sheikh Armiyawo Shaibu, Prof. Nana SKB Asante, Numo Blafo Akotia Omaetu III, Sheikh Salman Mohammed Alhassan, Mrs. Joana Adzoa Opare, Rt. Rev. Col. John Kwamina Otoo (Rtd), Mrs. Magdalene Awinyeliya Kannae, Archbishop Nicholas Duncan-Williams .

Vision

The National Peace Council's vision is to have a country characterized by a dynamic environment where people can engage in their lawful activities confident that the institutions, mechanisms, and capacities for mediating differences and grievance are effective and responsive.

Mission

The National Peace Council will facilitate the development of mechanisms for cooperation among all relevant stakeholders in peace building in Ghana by promoting cooperative problem solving to conflicts and by institutionalizing the processes of response to conflicts to produce outcomes that lead to conflict transformation, social, political and religious reconciliation and transformative dialogues.

Objective

The object of the council is to facilitate and develop mechanisms for conflict prevention, management, resolution and to build sustainable peace in the country.

== Notable actions ==
- Pleading for Kwadwo Owusu Afriyie before the Supreme Court of Ghana.
- Post-election mediation: Afrter 2020 elections, mediated to ensure EC fairness and transparency. Through National Peace Council efforts, the NDC returned to IPAC. Also engaging Electoral Commission ahead of 2024 elections.
- DRIVE Initiative: Launched the Development and Resilience Index against Violent Extremism to pilot until June 2026 Northern Ghana border areas. It’s an evidence-based to measure community resilience and vulnerability.
- Local Peace Committees: Established local/community peace committees in conflict-prone areas, especially across the 5 northern regions. Trained 9 member Local Peace Committee + 11 community monitors in Kongo, Tampane District to prevent violent extremism.
