= Carl Daniel Reindorf =

Ghanaian politician (born 1927)

Carl Daniel Reindolf

Member of the Ghana Parliament for Okaikwei
- In office 1969–1972
- President: Edward Akufo-Addo

Personal details
- Born: 29 June 1927
- Education: Accra High School and American Academy of Public Relations
- Occupation: Entrepreneur, Barrister and Solicitor

Carl Daniel Reindolf (born 29 June 1927) is a Ghanaian politician who was a member of the first parliament of the second Republic of Ghana. He represented the Okaikwei constituency under the membership of the progress party (PP)

== Early life and education ==
Reindolf was born on 29 June 1927. He attended Accra High School and American Academy of Public Relations where he obtained a Bachelor of Laws in Law and Public Relations. He later worked as an Entrepreneur, Barrister and Solicitor before going into Parliament.

== Politics ==
Reindolf began his political career in 1969 when he became the parliamentary candidate for the Progress Party (PP) to represent his constituency in the Greater Accra of Ghana prior to the commencement of the 1969 Ghanaian parliamentary election.

Reindolf was sworn into the First Parliament of the Second Republic of Ghana on 1 October 1969, after being pronounced winner at the 1969 Ghanaian election held on 26 August 1969. and his tenure ended on 13 January 1972.
