= Aayalolo =

Bus system in Accra, Ghana

Ayalolo BRT
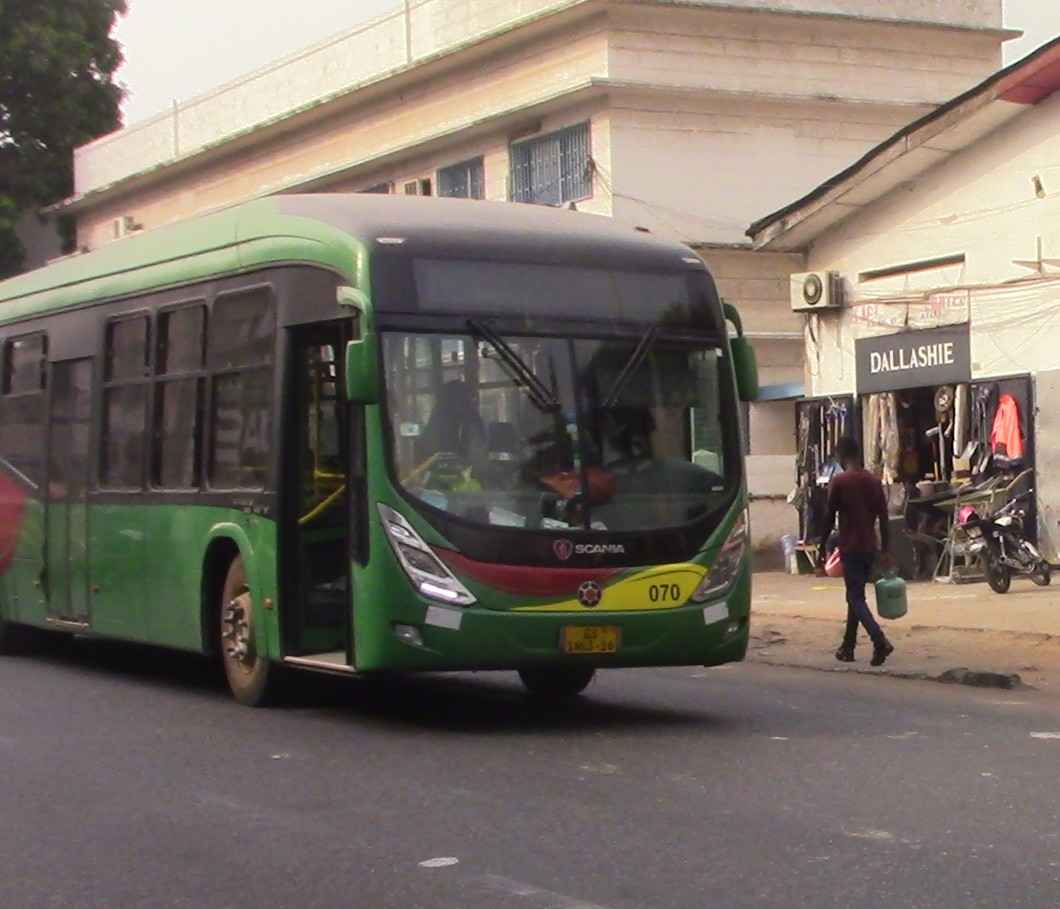

Overview
- Locale: Accra, Ghana
- Transit type: Bus rapid transit
- Number of lines: 1
- Number of stations: 27

Operation
- Began operation: 25 November 2016

Technical
- System length: 22 km (14 mi)

Aayololo is a bus rapid transit (BRT) system inaugurated on 25 November 2016, in Ghana which is operational in the capital city, Accra.

Aayalolo system started in 2016, it started work from Accra to Amasaman and Accra to Ofankor. It was initially planned as a bus transit system with dedicated lanes, but because these lanes were not provided it was renamed Quality Bus System (QBS). Aayalolo is a word from the Ga language which means "still moving on".

Currently Aaylolo operates from Accra to Amasaman, Adentan to Accra, Kasoa to Accra and Ofankor to Accra. It also started operating in the city of Tamale in March 2022. It ran along the Tamale-Nyankpala, and Tamale-Dungu routes.

== Regulation ==
The bus rapid transit (BRT) system is under regulation by the Urban Transport Project (UTP) of the Ministry of Roads and Highways.

== Funding ==
The projected is funded by four parties, The World Bank, the Agence Francaise de Development (AFD), the Government of Ghana and the Global Environment Facility Trust Fund and was implemented by the Ministry of Local Government and Rural Development, the Ministry of Roads and Highways and the Department of Urban Roads. The initial cost estimate was $95 million.

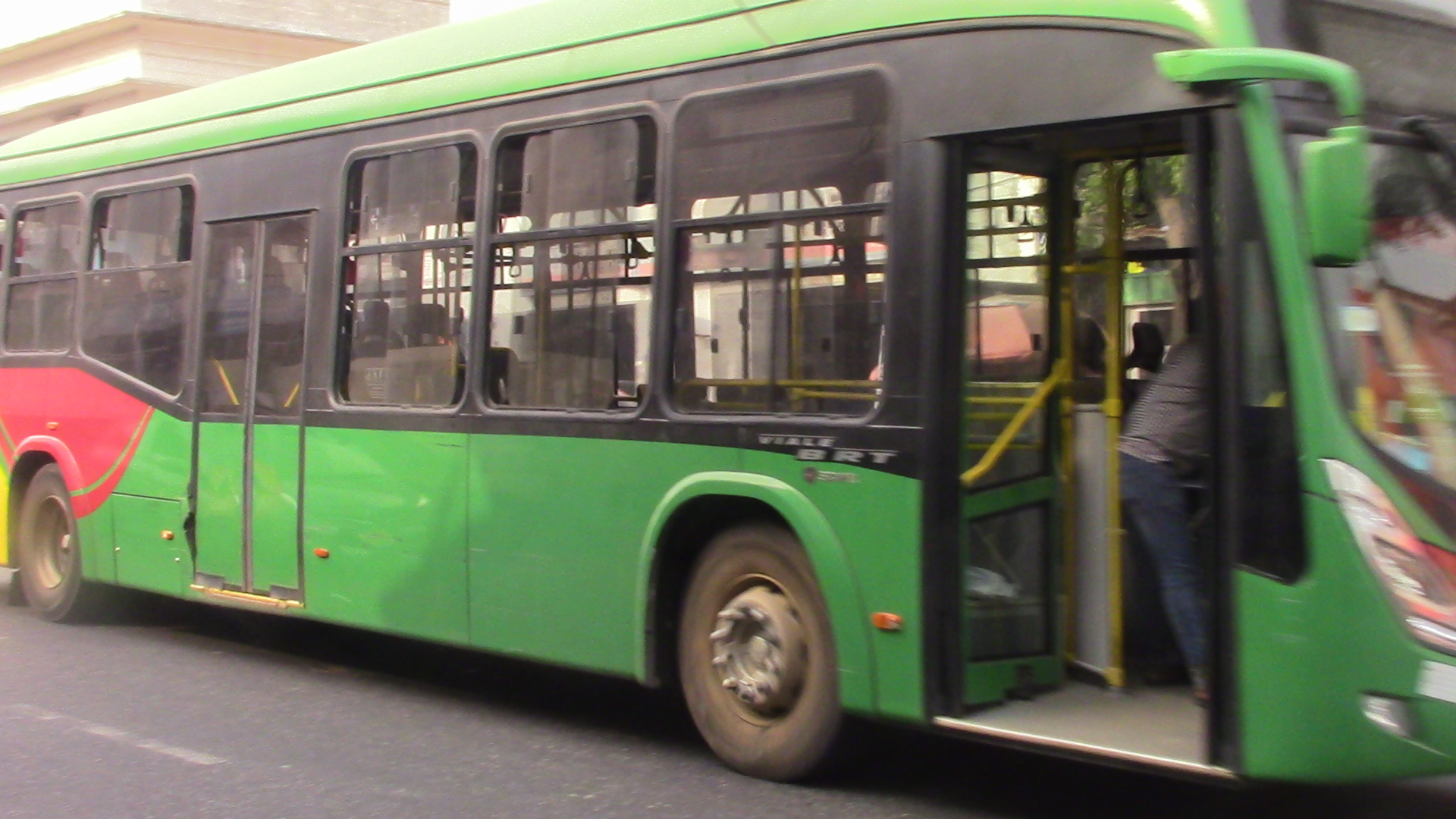
A side view of an Aayalolo Bus

== Challenges ==
The bus system was meant to use e-card as payment instead of cash, however management of the company could not provide e-cards to customers after they ran out.

== Controversies ==
On Monday, 24 February 2020, Drivers of Aayalolo Bus Rapid Transit System began a sit-down strike. They claim their salaries have not been paid by their employers for seven months.

However the Greater Accra Passenger Transport Executive's GAPTE claims its not true and they have been paid.
