= Don Bosco Matriculation Higher Secondary School, Thanjavur =

Don Bosco Matriculation Higher Secondary School
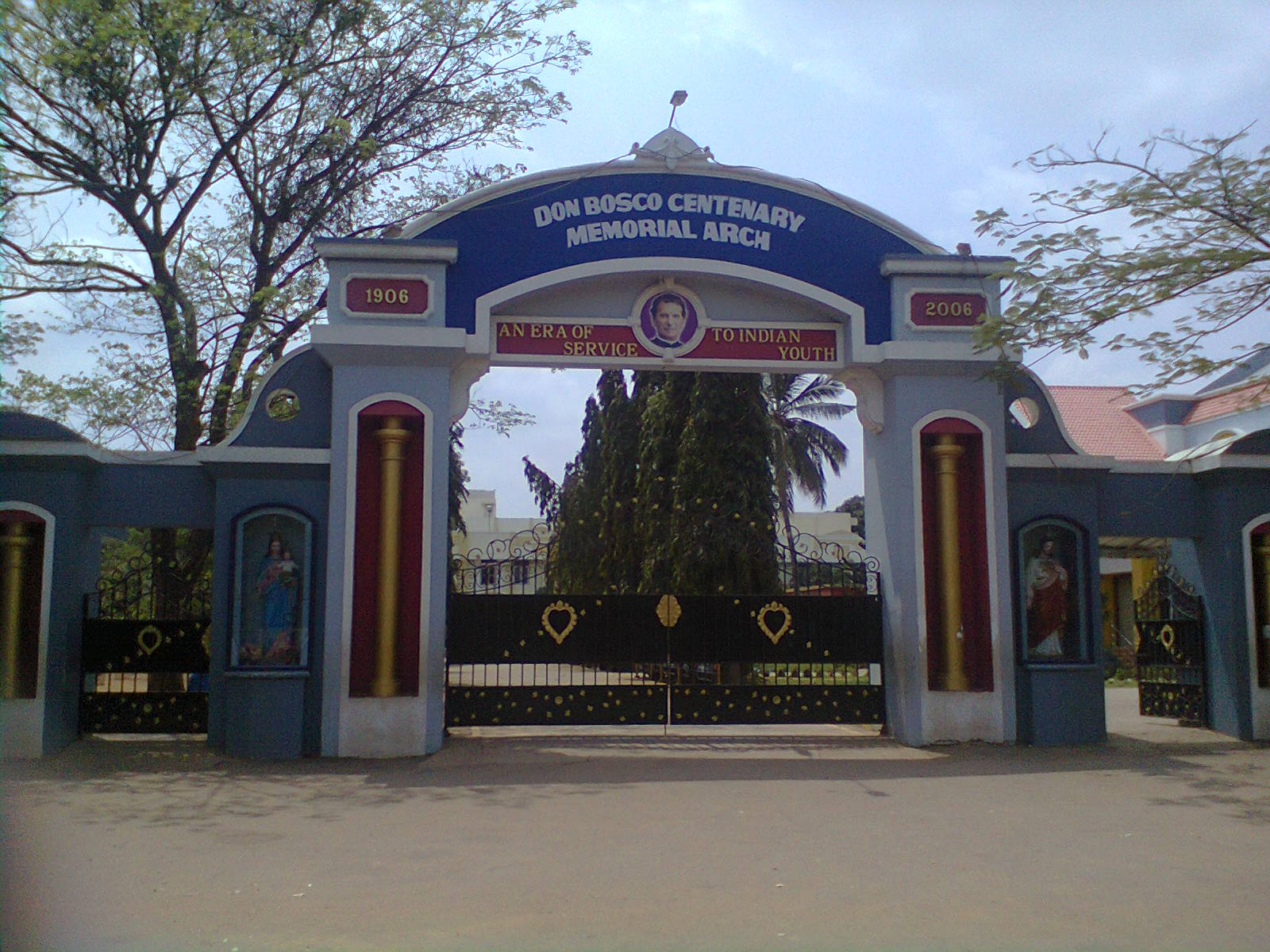

Location
- Yagappa Nagar; Thanjavur, Tamil Nadu, 613007; India; 10.7613°N 79.1338°E

Information
- Type: Private
- Motto: Love and Truth
- Established: 1906; 120 years ago
- School board: Tamil Nadu Board of Secondary Education
- Dean of studies: Rev. Fr. Immanuvel
- Administrator: Fr. Ashly
- Rector: Rev. Fr. Suresh
- Principal: Rev. Fr. Albert
- Teaching staff: 62
- Grades: K-12
- Language: English
- Classrooms: 42
- Campus type: Urban
- Website: www.donboscothanjavur.in

Don Bosco Matriculation Higher Secondary School, Thanjavur is an educational institution providing scholastic education. The school is under the administration of the Salesian Province of Tiruchirappalli. The institution has a Kindergarten, a Primary School, a High School and a Higher Secondary School. The institution is co-educational, providing schooling for both boys and girls. The Kindergarten and Primary schools are completely co-educational whereas the high school sections are partially co-educational. The medium of instruction is English. The second language is Tamil.

== History ==
The Salesians of Don Bosco arrived in Thanjavur in 1906, led by Fr. George Tomatis. They took charge of an orphanage and started an Industrial school for the youth. However, they were unable to continue their mission in Thanjavur after 1928. They returned in the year 1983 to resume their mission in Thanjavur.

They established a Seminary for the youth and a High School, conducting classes from 6th to 10th standard in the year 1983-84. The High School is affiliated to the Matriculation system of Tamil Nadu. They subsequently established a primary school, named "Dominic Savio" as part of the institution in the year 1985-86. Classes in the primary school were held for 1st and 2nd standard. The school continued to grow with the establishment of a new building in 1987. The Higher secondary course was introduced in the year 1994-95. The first batch of Higher secondary students passed out in the year 1996.

In 1993-94, the Salesians, established another institution named St.Michael's, in the nearby settlement of Madhakottai in Thanjavur. This was primarily to help the poor with a high standard of education. Until the year 2005, the school was exclusively for boys.

The school celebrated its Silver Jubilee with a grand function on 24 January 2008.

== Administration ==
The institution was initially under the administration of the Salesian Province of Madras which also administered institutions in Sri Lanka. As the Salesian mission expanded, the school came under the administration of the Salesian Province of Tiruchirappalli. The seminary is headed by a Rector Administrator. The activities of the school are administered by a principal. The high school and the higher secondary school are administered as one unit. The primary school, the kindergarten and a play-school are treated as another unit.

When the school began, teaching was entirely provided by the Salesian brothers. Early administrators of the school were exclusively Salesians. As the school expanded in the number of classes, the institution employed qualified teachers from the local population. Administrative duties were also slowly shared between the teachers and the Salesian brothers.

== Campus ==
The campus is located at Yagappa Nagar. It houses five blocks of buildings. The earliest building of the school has a refectory, and facilities for the Salesian brothers. The building also housed Resident Seminary students. The second building was originally used as an Auditorium, before accommodating the primary school classes. The third building, built in 1987 serves as the main block for the Higher secondary and High school. The fourth building, built in 2001 is the main block for the Primary school and Kindergarten.

Prior to the Silver Jubilee celebrations, a new block was commissioned, housing the new Auditorium and Computer Laboratory facilities. The "Centenary Memorial Hall" was inaugurated 6 February 2006 by Rev. Fr. Pascual Chavez, Rector Major of the Salesians.

The school has two football grounds, a basketball court and a volleyball court. The campus has been operating its own eco-friendly Gobar gas plant ever since its inception.

== Popular culture ==
- '96 (film)

Web Resources
URL Description	Content Publisher
Official Website	Salesians of Don Bosco, Thanjavur
Thanjavur (Don Bosco)	Salesian Provincial House, Trichy
