= Jefferson Sackey =

Ghanaian journalist (born 1978)

Jefferson Kwamina Sackey
- Born: Jefferson Sackey; 9 September 1978 (age 47); Accra Ghana
- Occupations: Journalist, presenter, newsreader, Media Consultant, Film Maker, and PR Strategist.
- Years active: 2003–present

Jefferson Kwamina Sackey (born September 9, 1978) is a Ghanaian journalist, media consultant, filmmaker, and PR strategist.

== Early life and career ==
Sackey was born in Senya Beraku in the Awutu Senya District of Ghana but grew up in Accra after moving there with his parents at a young age. He attended Riis Memorial School for his elementary and junior high school education. At the age of 9, he was featured on the popular kids' program 'Children's Own’ and ‘By the Fireside’ on Ghana Television. In the late nineties, while he was still in secondary school, he hosted the magazine program ‘Teen Beat’. In 1994, he continued his high school education at Accra High School. He later enrolled at the Ghana Institute of Journalism and the Deutsche Welle TV Training Institute in Berlin, Germany.

== Career ==
Sackey started working for Television Africa in 2005 as a lead news anchor. He then went on to host his global affairs show 'JS International Assignment' which later became 'Jefferson Sackey Reports', a news documentary production that aimed to tell in-depth stories which showcased many different points of view. Although the show started on TV Africa, it later aired on Joy News, Ghana and other international news channels including Afroglobal Television in Canada.

From 2006 to 2007, he was the Public Relations Officer for Ghana's Ministry of Foreign Affairs, where he worked closely with President Nana Addo Dankwa Akufo-Addo, who was then the Foreign Minister under the John Agyakum Kufuor administration. During the 2007 NPP primaries, Jefferson launched the documentary 'Pushing the Ghanaian and African Agenda' which showcases the then-candidate Nana Akuffo-Addo's diplomatic and international strength. Jefferson has also worked and reported for global news organizations such as CNN International as a contributor to 'World View' as well as Deutsche Welle Television as a West African Correspondent and contributor to "Quadriga."

His media career also includes working for Multimedia Group as a News Anchor for the Midday News where he also worked as Assistant News Editor until his relocation to Canada in 2015 where he was appointed Vice President of Afroglobal Television.

== Awards ==
| Year | Nominee / work | Award | Result |
|---|---|---|---|
| 2012 | Radio and Television Personality Awards | Best Correspondent of the Year | Won |
| 2015 | African Entertainment Awards | The Media Excellence Award | Won |
| 2015 | Planet Africa Media Award | The Volunteer Award | Won |
| 2015–2016 | Massey | College Gordon N Fisher/JHR Fellowship Awards | Nominated |
| 2014 | Honorary Doctorate Award | Day Spring Christian University, USA | Won |
