= Tema Oil Refinery =

Oil refinery in Greater Accra Region of Ghana

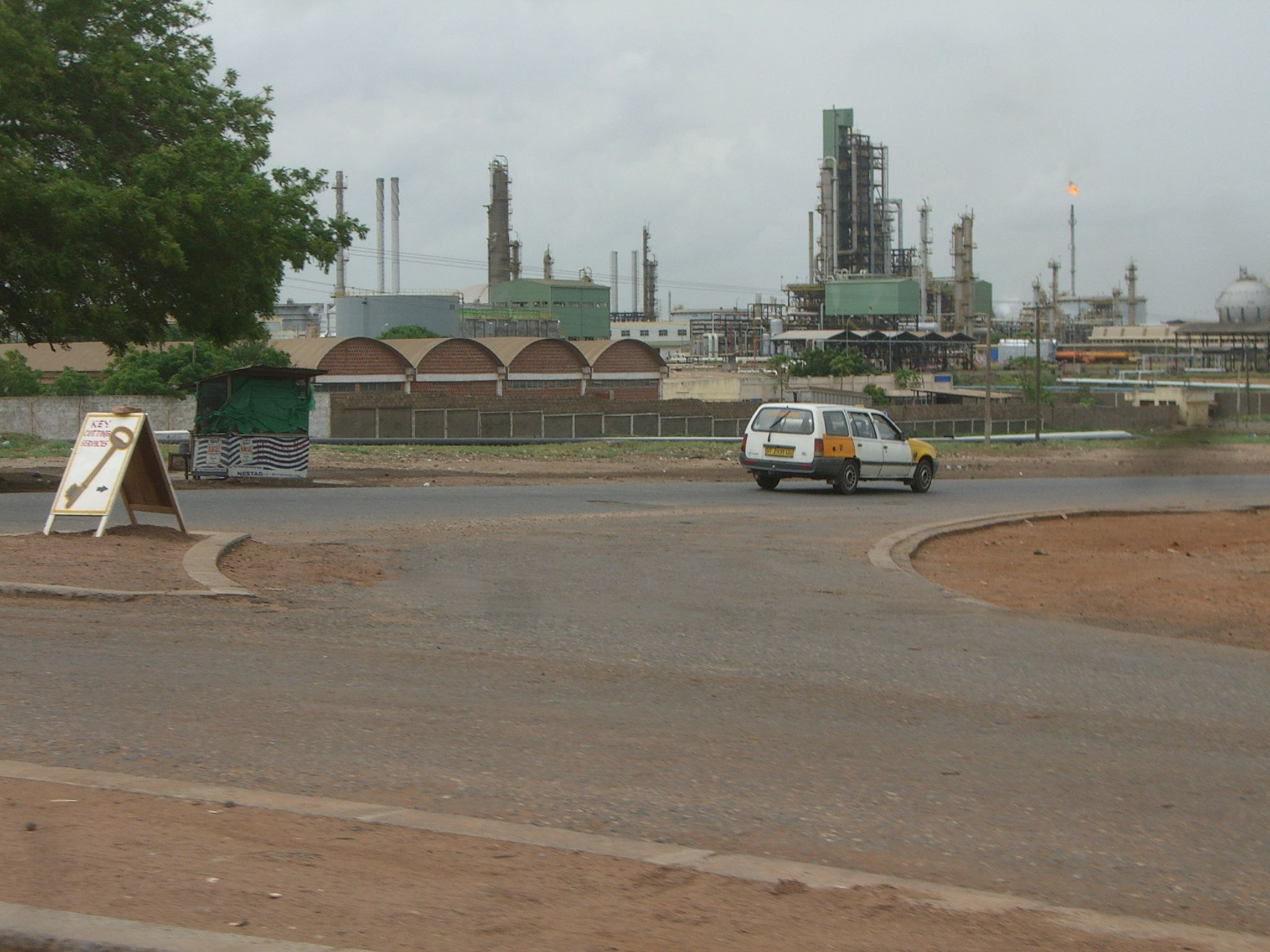

- Location within Ghana
- Location: Tema, Greater Accra, Ghana

Refinery details
- Operator: Tema Oil Refinery
- Opened: 1960

The Tema Oil Refinery (TOR) is one of two crude oil refineries in Ghana. In 1977, the Government of Ghana became the sole shareholder. The name of the refinery was changed to the Tema Oil Refinery in 1991. The refinery was first named the Ghanaian Italian Petroleum Company (GHAIP).

== History ==
The refinery is in Tema, the most industrialized city in Ghana. It is 24 kilometres (15 mi) from Accra, the capital of Ghana. The refinery was first named the Ghanaian Italian Petroleum Company (GHAIP). It was licensed as a private limited liability company in 1960 as a fully owned Italian company – ANIC Societa per Azioni and AGIP Societa per Azioni of Italy were its major shareholders. In April 1977, the Government of Ghana became the sole shareholder. The name of the refinery was changed to the Tema Oil Refinery in 1991. TOR is authorized by law to operate both as a refiner of crude oil and seller of petroleum products.

== Capacity ==
The refinery covers a total area of 440,000 square meters. It is linked to an oil jetty at the Port of Tema by pipelines of various diameters for the transportation of crude oil and refined petroleum products. TOR's refining plant was designed in 1963 as a Hydro-skimming plant with an initial capacity of 28,000 barrels per stream day. It was to process light and low sulfur crude oils, such as Bonny Light and Brass River from Nigeria, and Palanca Blend from Angola. The products of the refining process were liquefied petroleum gas, gasoline, illuminating and cooking kerosene, aviation turbine kerosene, gas-oil or diesel and residual oil. In 1977, as part of the first phase of TOR's expansion and modernization program, the Crude Distillation Unit (CDU) was revamped to 45,000 barrels per stream day. In 2002, as the second phase of the expansion and modernization program, a Residue Fluid Catalytic Cracking (RFCC) unit of capacity 14,000 barrels per stream day was commissioned. The RFCC was to convert the low valued residual fuel oil from the CDU into high valued products of LPG and gasoline.

Ghana started commercial production of crude oil in December, 2010. The country's Jubilee oil field produces the high grade 'Sweet Light' oil. The installation processes 9,548 tonnes (10,525 tons) of crude oil daily. However, TOR was built to process lower grade crudes and cannot refine oil from the new local fields unless significant investment was made. An engineer at the oil field said the costs of retrofitting required to cope with the higher grade oil (approximately $1 billion) was prohibitive, and that it was unlikely that the investment would ever be made. The refinery has an output capacity of about 6,138 metric tonnes per day.

TOR underwent the first phase of a major rehabilitation in 1989. The second phase began in April 1990 at an estimated cost of US$36 million. The aim of the rehabilitation is to improve distribution of liquefied petroleum gas, and increase its supply from 28,000 to 34,000 barrels (4,500 to 5,400 m^{3}) per day. Construction on the new Tema-Akosombo oil products pipeline, designed to carry refined products from Tema to Akosombo Port, began in January 1992. From there, oil is to be transported across Lake Volta to northern regions. In 2002, the Minister of Energy announced that the Government of Ghana had negotiated with Samsung Corporation of South Korea provide 230 million dollars for the funding of expansion works at the refinery. The major work was the installation of the Residue Fluid Catalytic Cracker (RFCC). There was an installation of two new steam boilers with a total capacity of 120 tonnes (130 tons) per day. These replaced three old boilers of total capacity of 60 tonnes (66 tons) per day which had been installed in 1963.

== TOR debts ==
The Government of Ghana in 2010 paid all the debt owed to Ghana Commercial Bank. The debt of 1 billion cedis had accrued due to Government of Ghana's subsidy on petroleum products.

On 29 September 2023, a gas booster station called Quantum Gas near the facility caught fire.

On July 15, 2026, the Tema Oil Refinery (TOR) received one million barrels of Ghana's locally produced Jubilee Medium Sweet Crude. This delivery represents a significant step forward in the efforts to bring the country's sole state-owned refinery back to full operational capacity and to enhance domestic petroleum refining.

== See also ==
- Ministry of Fisheries and Aquaculture Development
- Ghana National Petroleum Corporation
