= Jubilee Oil Field =

Ghanaian oil field in the Atlantic Ocean

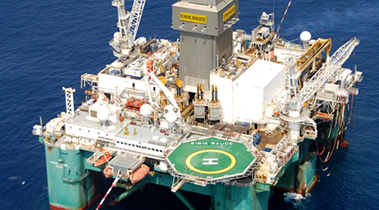
- Jubilee Oil Field of the Ghana National Petroleum Corporation (GNPC) and National Petroleum Authority.
- Country: Ghana
- Region: Western Region
- Location: South Atlantic Ocean
- Offshore/onshore: offshore
- Coordinates: 4.492°N 2.916°W
- Operator: Tullow Oil - 35.48% Kosmos Energy - 24.1% Occidental Petroleum - 23.4% Ghana National Petroleum Corporation - 10% PetroSA Ghana - 4.05%

Field history
- Discovery: 2007
- Start of development: 2007
- Start of production: 2010

Production
- Current production of oil: 75,000 barrels per day (~3.7×10^{6} t/a)
- Year of current production of oil: 2021
- Estimated oil in place: 368 million tonnes (~ 500×10^{6} m^{3} or 3000 million bbl)
- Estimated gas in place: 34×10^{9} m^{3} 1.2×10^{12} cu ft

The Jubilee Oil Field is an oil field located off the coast of Ghana's Western Region in the South Atlantic Ocean under the ownership of the Kosmos Energy, Occidental Petroleum and the Tullow Oil.

The Jubilee field is located 60 km offshore, between the Deepwater Tano and West Cape Three Points blocks off the coast of the Ghana's Western Region in Ghana.

== History ==
Jubilee offshore oilfield was discovered in 2007 by Kosmos Energy and developed by Tullow Oil.

Equity partners of the Deepwater Tano block are Tullow with 49.95%, Kosmos with 18%, Oxy with 18%, PetroSA Ghana with 4.05%, and Ghana National Petroleum Corporation (GNPC) with 10%.

West Cape Three Points is held by Tullow with 22.9%, Kosmos with 30.88%, Oxy with 30.88%, PetroSA Ghana with 1.85%, GNPC with 10%, and EO Group with 3.5%.

The Jubilee appraisal and development programme began at the end of 2008 and the Odum, Mahogany-2, Heydua-2 and Mahogany-3 wells were drilled.

Parallel to the appraisal drilling programme, phase I development of the core field has progressed at a rapid pace since July 2008. Tullow is the operator and Kosmos Energy is the technical operator of the phase I development plan.

The tanker vessel Ohdoh was converted for the Jubilee field and christened the floating, production, storage and offloading (FPSO) vessel Kwame Nkrumah MV21.

== Production ==
Jubilee offshore oilfield began production in 2010 and produces oil. The total proven reserves of the Jubilee oil field are around 3 billion barrels (480,000,000 m^{3}), and production is centered on 150,000 barrels per day (24,000 m^{3}/d).

Tullow Oil failed to meet production targets at the Jubilee oilfield at the end of 2012, causing problems for the firm and the Ghanaian government. The declining productivity led to declining revenues for the government who had budgeted for oil revenue of more than $650 million. The corresponding shortfall was more than $410 million. The oil firm blamed the decline on "sand contamination of the flowlines that carry the oil from the underwater wells" to the storage facility on the surface.

The field produced 75,000 barrels per day (11,900 m^{3}/d) in 2021.

Tullow Oil's Jubilee Oil Field production decreased to 89,000 bpd by October 2024, from over 90,000 bpd in July. The drop was linked to issues with the J69-P Well, unplanned downtime at the Ghana Gas Company, and power outages. The company is optimistic about recovery, with high FPSO uptime of 98% and corrective measures in place. Tullow also reported that the Government of Ghana owes $40 million for overdue gas payments.

== Readiness Report Card ==
On April 11, 2011, the Civil Society Platform on Oil and Gas (funded by the World Bank) gave Ghana a "C" grade in its Readiness Report Card. This report evaluates the government's performance in 10 thematic areas: Transparency, Independent Regulation of the Sector / Role of GNCP, Licensing and Contracts, Citizen Participation / Public Oversight, Petroleum Revenue Collection, Oil Revenue Management / Oil Funds, Linking Oil Revenue Spending to Development Planning, Budget Openness and Public Financial Management, Social and Environmental Issues, and Local Content. The assessments were based from the Government of Ghana, Parliament of Ghana, Ghana's Donor Partners, Oil and Gas Companies, and Civil Society.

=== Transparency ===
Since the discovery of oil in 2007, the administrators placed the importance of transparency and accountability in the management of the oil sector and revenues. It ensures value for money for contracts, allows citizens to monitor contract executions and prevents corruption among others. The grade given was a B.

=== Independent Regulation of the Sector / Role of GNPC ===
Ghana's Petroleum law put the power to regulate petroleum operations to the Minister. The Minister has however relied on the technical expertise of the Ghana National Petroleum Corporation (GNPC) to perform this function. As a result, some misunderstanding regarding the role of the GNPC and thereby raised issues of conflict of interest in the GNPC‘s functions. The independent regulation will continue to be problematic because of technical capacity problems usually faced by new oil producers, lack of appropriate logistics and equipment, financial dependence on the government and possible political party patronage from the governing board of the Petroleum Commission. The grade given was a D.

=== Licensing and Contracts ===
A transparent and competitive licensing and contracting processing in the oil and gas sector to properly start the operation of offshore drilling. As little progress was made since demands for a moratorium on new explorations licenses were ignored and closed door negotiations continued. This resulted in 41 companies expressed their interest in Ghana's new oil production which would increase revenue to the country. Members of Parliament in both the majority and minority have complained that votes have taken place without all members having access to the full agreement, which led to Conflicting evidence of parliamentary engagement in approval of oil agreements. The grade given was a D.

=== Social and Environmental Issues ===
Most of the negative environmental consequences of oil industry activities are localized and more intense in the areas of primary activities, but each round of environment degrading activity tends to increase the incidence of poverty among vulnerable groups such as fishermen and their dependents. This also escalated the exploitation of existing natural resources such as pollution of major fishing waters leads to massive exploitation of marginal fishing waters. This led to a vicious cycled relationship between the environmental degradation and poverty incidence as fishermen did not receive any compensation from oil companies. the call on government to establish an inclusive process to manage the conflicting use of the sea and the development of clear regulations on compensations has received very little attention. A study, by Oxfam America in 2009 on the environmental material for the first phase of the Jubilee project, summaries the weaknesses in the assessment as incorrect classification of the Jubilee project as Category B, no complete ESIA, preconceived conclusions, second-hand, single hulled tanker, inadequate assessment of impacts on endangered species, critical habitats, dumping of drilling wastes into the sea, and lack of demonstration of compliance with international standards. The grade given was a D.

==== Social Issue with Fishing Industry in Ghana ====
The fishing industry in Ghana accounts for nearly 5% of GDP and supported up to 10% of the country's population which approximated 2 million people that were involved in localized catching, marketing and processing. While there was no law obliging to accommodate any of the fishing industry in the event of a spill off the coast of Ghana. Therefore no compensation fund was set to give forth to fishermen in an event of a spill. A law was passed where fishermen could not be in a 500-meter radius around Jubilee, which limits the fishermen. Fishermen noticed an increase of tankers, shipping traffic, and risks of collision as more ballasts were being dumped into sea, resulting in pollution and less fish.

==== Environmental Issues of Pollution ====
On November 3, 2011, fishermen spotted a large oil slick floating towards land. The following day, oil sludge hit beaches of several fishing communities at Ghana’s Ahanta West District. Tarballs, which are blobs of petroleum floating in the ocean, have been seen floating on the coast from Jubilee’s new drilling. Pipelines running from offshore rigs can also worsen water quality. In addition, toxic waste brought from offshore drilling may pollute drinking water. The offshore drilling has also affected the biodiversity of the marine ecosystems. As fishermen have reported less fish being caught and seen which result in less revenue. In 2009, it was reported that 8 dead whales washed ashore.

== Sister well ==
- Tweneboa-Enyenra-Ntomme Oil Field

== See also ==
- Atuabo Gas Plant
