= FPSO John Agyekum Kufour =

The FPSO John Agyekum Kufuor is a floating production storage and offloading (FPSO) vessel. It operates in the Sankofa offshore cape three point (OCTP - ENI) off the coast of Ghana. She is named after a former president of Ghana, John Agyekum Kufuor.
