= MODEC =

Floating platform company

MODEC, Inc.
- Native name: 三井海洋開発株式会社
- Type: Public (K.K)
- Traded as: TYO: 6269
- ISIN: JP3888250002
- Industry: Machinery; Shipbuilding
- Founded: December 26, 1968; 57 years ago
- Headquarters: Nihonbashi, Chuo-ku, Tokyo 103-0027, Japan
- Area served: Worldwide
- Key people: Hirohiko Miyata (President and CEO)
- Products: FPSOs; TLPs; Semi-submersible LNG/LPG vessels
- Revenue: ▲JPY 221.9 billion (FY 2018) (US$ 2 billion) (FY 2018)
- Net income: ▲JPY 21.8 billion (FY 2018) (US$ 198 million) (FY 2018)
- Owner: Mitsui E&S (50.1%)
- Number of employees: 4,241 (consolidated, June 30, 2018)
- Website: www.modec.com

MODEC Inc. (三井海洋開発株式会社, Mitsui Kaiyōkaihatsu Kabushikigaisha; Mitsui Ocean Development & Engineering Company Inc.) is a global supplier and operator of offshore floating platforms.

== Background ==
The company has headquarters in Tokyo, Japan and regional offices in Angola, Australia, Brazil, Senegal, Belgium, Ghana, Ivory Coast, Indonesia, Mexico, Nigeria, Singapore, Thailand, United States and Vietnam.

MODEC holds 51% of the shares in SOFEC, Inc and 20% of the shares in NATCO Japan Co., Ltd. Mitsui Engineering & Shipbuilding holds around 18,700,000 shares which represents just over 50% of the company shares issued.

The company has operations in all major offshore regions and currently owns and operates 23 Floating Production Storage and Offloading vessels.

== Company history ==
The company was founded in 1968. In the mid 1970s, MODEC began constructing jack-up drilling rigs.

The company's first offshore production vessel was the FPSO Kakap Natuna installed in April 1986 at the Kakap KH field in 88 meters water depth, approximately 175 miles west of Great Natuna Island offshore Indonesia.

MODEC delivered its first Tension leg platform (TLP) in 2001, which is installed on El Paso's Prince field in the Gulf of Mexico in 454 m (1,490 ft) water depth In 2003, MODEC had an initial public offering and was listed on the second section of the Tokyo stock exchange.

In 2006, MODEC acquired SOFEC, Inc. and purchased 20% of the shares in NATCO Japan Co., Ltd

In 2007, MODEC entered into a joint development agreement with Velocys Inc. and Toyo Engineering Corporation to develop and commercialize gas to liquids technology for offshore applications.

MODEC has developed a proprietary Semi-submersible design called the Central Pontoon Semi (CP Semi) for use as a production platform, but has not yet gained any orders for this design.

From the announcement of the financial results for the year ending December 31, 2021, the currency used in the financial results was changed from Japanese yen to United States dollars.

== See also ==
- List of oilfield service companies
