= Ramya Sathianathan Polytechnic and B.Ed College =

College in Tamil Nadu, India

Ramya Sathianathan Polytechnic College
- Other names: RSPC
- Motto: Technology For A Better Tomorrow
- Established: 2011
- Founders: R. Sathianathan, Janet Ramya
- Academic affiliations: BOTE
- Students: 500
- Undergraduates: 500
- Location: Pudhupatti, Thanjavur, Tamil Nadu, India; 10.7509°N 79.1542°E
- Website: www.rspolytechniccollege.com

Ramya Sathianathan Polytechnic and B.Ed College is a private college in Pudhupatti, Tiruchirapalli, India under the Directorate of Technical Education, Chennai. It offers Diploma Courses and B.Ed.

== History ==
The school was co-founded by civil engineer R. Sathianathan. His wife and co-founder is Janet Ramya. They formed a registered Trust, Rayappan Mariyapushpam Educational and Public Charitable Trust, to support the school in 2010 in the name of their parents. The pair established two Colleges to educate underprivileged youth. The technical institution was named Ramya Sathianathan Polytechnic College in 2011 at Pudupatti Village. The second institution was Ramya Sathianathan College of Education in 2012 on the same campus.

== Courses offered ==
UG Courses

- Diploma in Automobile Engineering
- Diploma in Civil Engineering
- Diploma in Electronics and Communication Engineering
- Diploma in Electrical and Electronics Engineering
- Diploma in Mechanical Engineering

== Subjects offered in B.Ed. ==
- Tamil
- English
- Mathematics
- Physical Science
- Biological Science
- History
- Geography
- Economics
- Commerce
- Computer Science

== Facilities ==
- Well Equipped Modern Laboratories
- Hostel
- Transport
- Cafeteria
- Library

== Other institutions ==
- Ramya Sathianathan Vidhyashram CBSE School
