= Ghana National Petroleum Corporation =

Ghanaian state agency

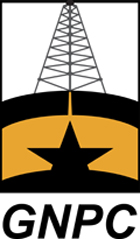
- Industry: Oil and gas industry
- Founded: 1983
- Headquarters: Tema, Greater Accra, Ghana
- Key people: Alex Mould (2013-2016), K.K Sarpong (2017-2022), O.A Danquah (2022-present)
- Owner: Government of Ghana
- Website: www.gnpcghana.com

The Ghana National Petroleum Corporation (GNPC) is a state agency responsible for the exploration, licensing, and distribution of petroleum-related activities in Ghana.

== History ==
GNPC is Ghana's National Oil Company (NOC) which was established in 1983 to replace the Petroleum Department which was an agency under the Ministry of Fuel and power. The department was responsible for the importation of crude oil and petroleum products for the Ghanaian economy. The mandate for oil exploration was held to be the Technical Directorate of the Ministry of Fuel and Power and the Geological Survey Department. The corporation was created to promote the Government of Ghana's objective of supplying adequate and reliable petroleum for the country and the discovery of crude oil in the country's territories. And also to help in reducing the country's dependence on crude oil imports, through the development of the country's own petroleum resources.

In 2025, GNPC signed an energy cooperation pact with Eni and partners of the Offshore Cape Three Points (OCTP) aimed at increasing oil and gas production while also promoting sustainable initiatives.

== Board Members ==
- Freddie Blay - Board Chairman
- Chief Executive Officer - Kwame Ntow Amoah.
- Opoku-Ahweneeh Danquah - Ag. Chief Executive
- Yoo Naa Andani Yakubu Abdulai V - Board Member
- Kwabena Kwakye - Board Member
- Nana Ogye Ahohoo Yaw Gyebi II - Board Member
- Madam Ama Gyamfuah Abrefa - Board Member
- Yaw Kyei - Board Member

== Management Team ==
- Opoku-Ahweneeh Danquah - Ag. Chief Executive Officer
- Joseph Dadzie - DCE, Commerce, Strategy and Business Development
- Benjamin Acolatse - DCE, Finance and Administration
- Victor Sunu-Attah - GM, Engineering
- Cherrison Eleazer Shooter - GM, Finance & Accounting
- Alex Prempeh Kwarteng - GM, Projects
- Alex Prempeh Kwarteng - GM, Projects
- Adwoa Afriyie Wiafe - GM, Legal & Compliance
- Anthony Kobina Ampofo - GM, Commerce
- Dominic Kwesi Eduah - Executive Director, GNPC Foundation.

== Mandate ==
The corporation was established as a state-owned company with the statutory backing of PNDC Laws 64 and 84. The laws mandated the corporation to engage in exploration, production and disposal of petroleum products. The laws also established the legal structure that informed the corporation in contractual agreements between the Government of Ghana and private oil exploration companies. In 1987, the Petroleum Income Tax Law were added to the corporation's mandate to permit it to tax various petroleum products for consumption. The law was the PNDC Law 188.

== Functions ==
Promoting petroleum exploration efforts is one of the corporation's duties. The institution also appraises existing petroleum discoveries, and to ensure that Ghana benefits the most from the development of the country's petroleum resources. The corporation promotes the training of Ghanaians in petroleum-related activities and ensures environmental protection in all petroleum-related activities.

== Jubilee fields ==
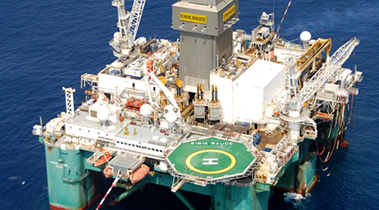
Jubilee Oil Field of the Ghana National Petroleum Corporation (GNPC) and National Petroleum Authority located off the coast of the Western Region in Ghana in the South Atlantic Ocean.

The corporation announced in 2007 that the Petroleum Agreement signed in 2004 had yielded in the discovery of oil in commercial quantities. Production of crude oil begun in December 2010. The country's oil fields are known as Jubilee fields and is situated at Cape Three Points in the Western region of the country. The corporation has controlling stake in all the oil wells that produce crude oil. In April 2011, GNPC confirmed that it had an initial 10% interest in a new oil discovery at the Paradise prospect offshore Ghana. The discovery was announced in April 2011 by Hess Corporation, a New York based oil company. In June 2011, the corporation lifted 135,675 metric tonnes of Jubilee crude oil from the FPSO Kwame Nkrumah. This represented crude oil on behalf of the Ghana Group, comprising the Government of Ghana (GoG) and GNPC. It represented the first lifting of crude oil from the Jubilee fields. The barrels lifted comprised accumulated government royalties of 37,557 metric tonnes and accumulated GNPC's 13.75 per cent participating interest entitlement of 98,119 metric tonnes.

== Recognitions and Conferences ==
=== African Energy Week (AEW) 2024 ===
The Ghana National Petroleum Corporation (GNPC) participated in the African Energy Week (AEW) 2024

== See also ==
- Ghana Oil Company
- Tema Oil Refinery
