= List of companies of Ghana =

Location of Ghana

Ghana is a unitary presidential constitutional democracy, located along the Gulf of Guinea and Atlantic Ocean, in the subregion of West Africa. A multicultural nation, Ghana has a population of approximately 27 million, spanning a variety of ethnic, linguistic and religious groups. Five percent of the population practices traditional faiths, 71.2% adhere to Christianity and 17.6% are Muslim. Its diverse geography and ecology ranges from coastal savannahs to tropical jungles. Ghana is a democratic country led by a president who is both head of state and head of the government. Ghana's economy is one of the strongest and most diversified in Africa, following a quarter-century of relative stability and good governance. Ghana's growing economic prosperity and democratic political system have made it a regional power in West Africa.

== Notable firms ==
This list includes notable companies with primary headquarters located in the country. The industry and sector follow the Industry Classification Benchmark taxonomy. Organizations which have ceased operations are included and noted as defunct.

Notable companies Status: P=Private, S=State; A=Active, D=Defunct
Name	Industry	Sector	Headquarters	Founded	Notes	Status	
Accra Brewery Company	Consumer goods	Brewers	Accra	1931	Brewery, GSE: ABL	P	A
Aerogem Aviation	Industrials	Delivery services	Accra	2000	Cargo airline	P	A
Afra Airlines	Consumer services	Airlines	Accra	2003	Airline, defunct 2005	P	D
Africa World Airlines	Consumer services	Airlines	Accra	2010	Airline	P	A
African Champion Industries	Basic materials	Paper	Accra	1967	Paper, GSE: ACI	P	A
Agricultural Development Bank of Ghana	Financials	Banks	Accra	1965	Commercial bank	P	A
Aluworks	Basic materials	Aluminum	Accra	1978	Aluminium-based products, GSE: ALW	P	A
AmalBank	Financials	Banks	Sunyani	1997	Commercial bank	P	A
Antrak Air	Consumer services	Airlines	Accra	2003	Airline	P	A
Ashanti Goldfields Corporation	Basic materials	Gold mining	Obuasi	1897	Gold mining, merged into AngloGold Ashanti (South Africa)	P	D
Ayrton Drugs	Health care	Pharmaceuticals	Accra	1965	Pharmaceutical, GSE: AYRTN	P	A
Bank of Africa Ghana Limited	Financials	Banks	Accra	1997	Commercial bank	P	A
Bank of Ghana	Financials	Banks	Accra	1957	State bank	S	A
Benso Oil Palm Plantation	Consumer goods	Food products	Sekondi-Takoradi	2004	Food processing, palm oil, GSE: BOPP	P	A
British American Tobacco Ghana	Consumer goods	Tobacco	Accra	1991	Ghanaian arm of British American Tobacco, defunct 2006	P	D
CAL Bank	Financials	Banks	Accra	1990	Financial services, GSE: CAL	P	A
Camelot Ghana	Industrials	Business support services	Accra	1963	Printing, GSE: CMLT	P	A
Capital Bank	Financials	Banks	Accra	2009	Commercial bank	P	A
CFAO Ghana	Consumer goods	Automobiles	Accra	1909	Automotive	P	A
Clydestone Ghana	Technology	Software	Accra	1989	Information technology, GSE: CLYD	P	A
Cocoa Processing Company	Consumer goods	Food products	Accra	1981	Food processing, cocoa bean, GSE: CPC	P	A
CTK – CiTylinK	Consumer services	Airlines	Accra	1994	Airline, defunct 2013	P	D
Eagle Atlantic Airlines	Consumer services	Airlines	Accra	2013	Airline, defunct 2014	P	D
Ecobank Ghana	Financials	Banks	Accra	1990	Commercial bank	P	A
Enterprise Group	Financials	Full line insurance	Accra	1924	Insurance, GSE: EGL	P	A
GCB Bank Ltd	Financials	Banks	Accra	1953	Financial services, GSE: GCB	P	A
Ghana Airways	Consumer services	Airlines	Accra	1958	National airline, defunct 2015	P	D
Ghana Broadcasting Corporation	Consumer services	Broadcasting & entertainment	Accra	1953	Public broadcasting	S	A
Ghana International Airlines	Consumer services	Airlines	Accra	2005	National airline, defunct 2010	P	D
Ghana National Petroleum Corporation	Oil & gas	Exploration & production	Accra	1987	Oil and gas industry	S	A
Ghana News Agency	Consumer services	Broadcasting & entertainment	Accra	1957	News agency	P	A
Ghana Oil Company	Oil & gas	Exploration & production	Accra	1960	Oil and gas industry, GSE: GOIL	P	A
Ghana Ports and Harbours Authority	Industrials	Transportation services	Sekondi-Takoradi	?	Transportation	S	A
Ghana Post	Industrials	Delivery services	Accra	?	Postal services	P	A
Ghana Railway Corporation	Industrials	Railroads	Sekondi-Takoradi	1898	Rail transport	P	A
GN Bank	Financials	Banks	Accra	1997	Commercial bank	P	A
Golden Web	Consumer goods	Food products	Kumasi	1982	Food processing, GSE: GWEB	P	A
Guinness Ghana Breweries	Consumer goods	Brewers	Kumasi	1991	Brewery, part of Diageo (UK), GSE: GGBL	P	A
Home Finance Company (HFC Bank)	Financials	Banks	Accra	1990	Commercial bank	P	A
Kuapa Kokoo	Consumer goods	Food products	Kumasi	1993	Cocoa exports	P	A
Mazzuma	Consumer services	Financials	Accra	2015	FinTech	P	A
Meridian Airways	Industrials	Delivery services	Accra	2007	Cargo airline, defunct 2015	P	D
Metro Mass Transit Company Limited	Consumer services	Travel & tourism	Accra	1927	Public transportation company	P	A
Metro TV (Ghana)	Consumer services	Broadcasting & entertainment	Accra	1997	Television broadcaster	P	A
National Investment Bank	Financials	Banks	Accra	1963	Commercial bank	P	A
Passion Air	Consumer services	Airline	Accra	2017	Airline	P	A
Pioneer Kitchenware	Consumer goods	Durable household products	Accra	1957	Kitchenware company, GSE: PKL	P	A
Printex	Consumer goods	Clothing & accessories	Accra	1958	Textiles	P	A
Produce Buying Company	Consumer goods	Food products	Accra	1981	Cocoa bean company, GSE: PBC	P	A
Prudential Bank Limited	Financials	Banks	Accra	1996	Commercial bank	P	A
Sam-Woode Limited	Consumer services	Publishing	Accra	1984	Publishing company, GSE: SWL	P	A
SIC Insurance Company	Financials	Full line insurance	Accra	1962	Insurance, GSE: SIC	P	A
Societe Generale Ghana	Financials	Banks	Accra	1975	Bank	P	A
Star Africa Commodities & Minerals Limited	Oil & gas	Exploration & production	Accra	2009	Oil and gas	P	A
Starbow	Consumer services	Airlines	Accra	1995	Airline; Defunct 2017	P	D
Starwin Products	Health care	Pharmaceuticals	Accra	1960	Pharmaceutical company, GSE: SPL	P	A
Suretrack Contracts Services	Industrials	Heavy construction	Accra	2007	Construction company	P	A
The Trust Bank	Financials	Banks	Accra	1996	Commercial bank	P	A
Transol Solutions Ghana	Industrials	Electronic equipment	Accra	2002	Electronics company, GSE: TRANSOL	P	A
Trashy Bags	Consumer goods	Containers & packaging	Accra	2007	Consumer products NGO	P	A
TV Africa	Consumer services	Broadcasting & entertainment	Accra	?	Television broadcaster	P	A
TV3 Ghana	Consumer services	Broadcasting & entertainment	Accra	1997	Television broadcaster	P	A
UniBank	Financials	Banks	Accra	1997	Commercial bank	P	A
Unilever Ghana	Consumer goods	Personal products	Accra	1992	Part of Unilever (Netherlands)	P	A
United Television Ghana	Consumer services	Broadcasting & entertainment	Accra	2013	Television broadcaster	P	A
Universal Merchant Bank	Financials	Banks	Accra	1972	Financial services	P	A
Vodafone Ghana	Telecommunications	Fixed line telecommunications	Accra	1974	Telecom, now owned 70% by Vodafone (UK)	P	A
Volta Aluminum Company	Basic materials	Aluminum	Accra	1948	Aluminium	P	A
Volta River Authority	Utilities	Conventional electricity	Accra	1961	Electricity company	P	A

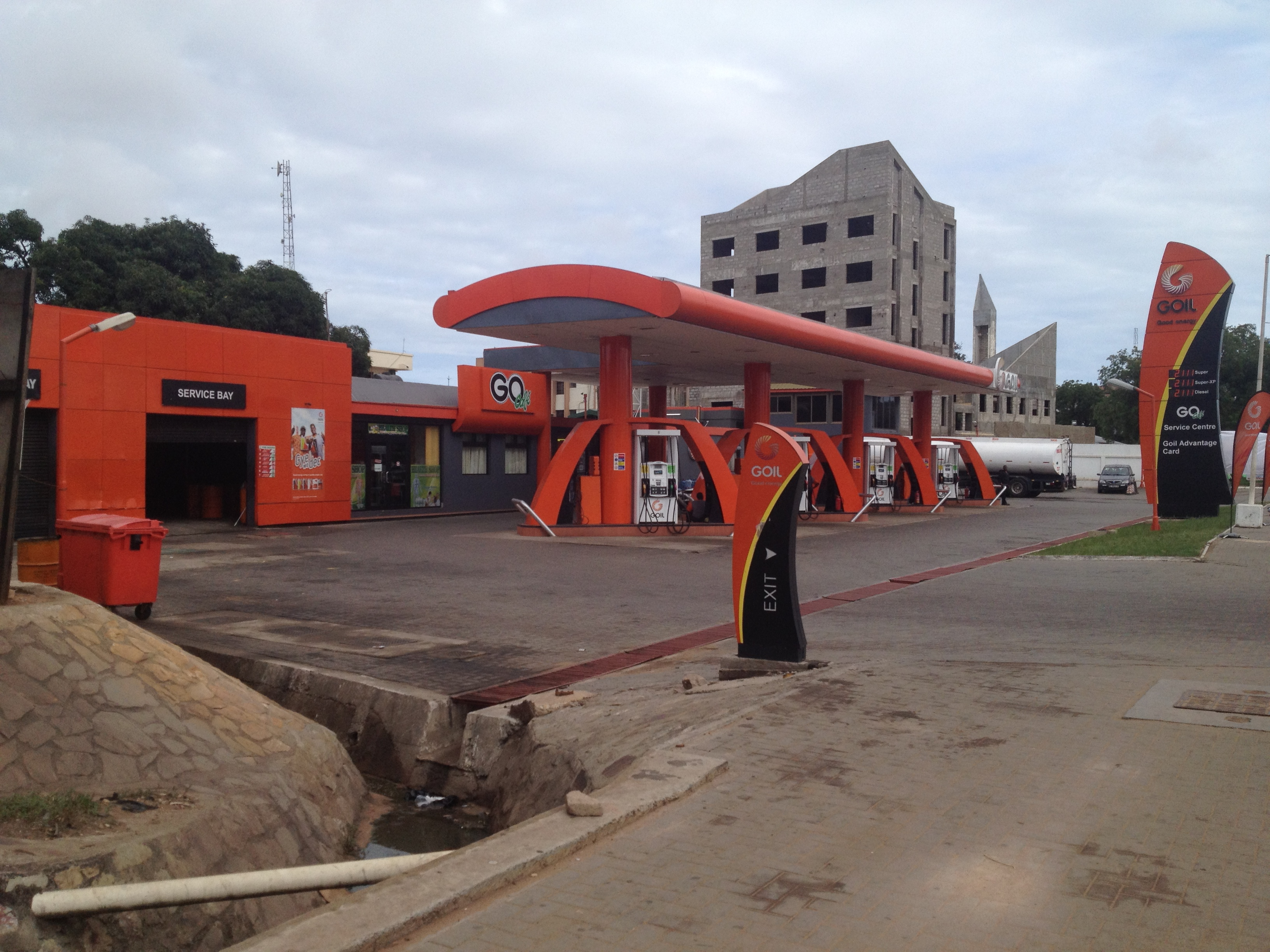
Ghana Oil Company in Accra.

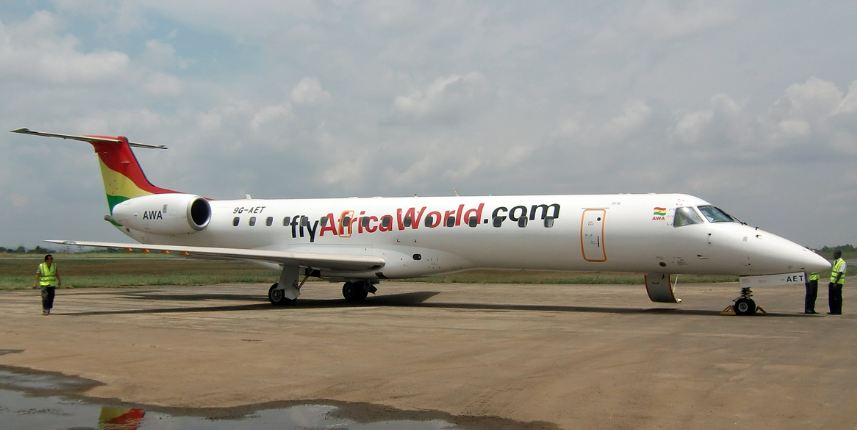
An Africa World Airlines ERJ-145LR at Kumasi Airport.

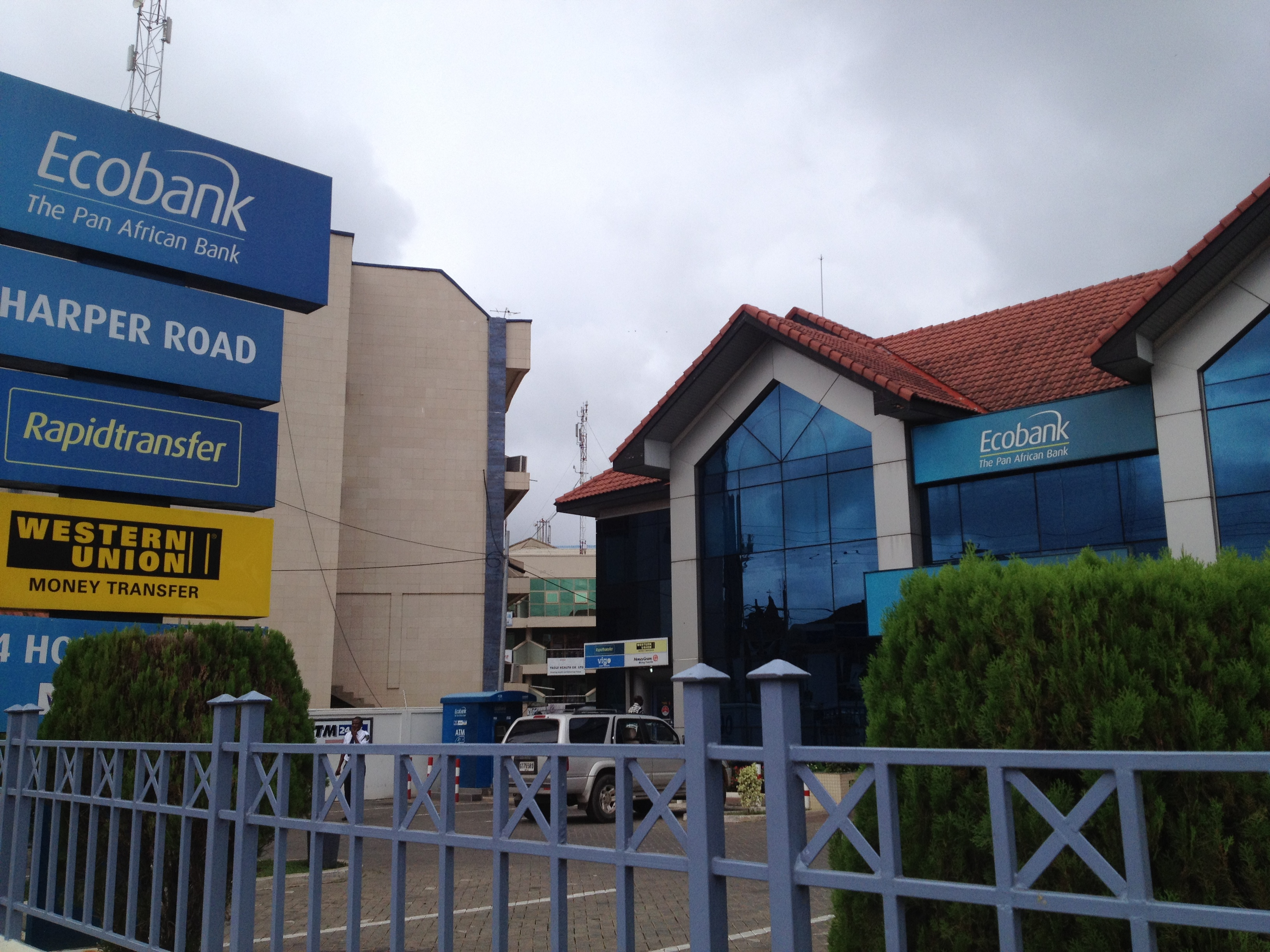
Ecobank Ghana in Kumasi.

== See also ==
- Ghana Stock Exchange
- GSE All-Share Index
- Economy of Ghana
- List of Shopping Malls in Ghana
