= Ghana Club 100 =

Annual list of top companies in Ghana

The Ghana Club 100 is a yearly official list of the top 100 companies in Ghana. The compilation was first done in 1998 by the Ghana Investment Promotion Centre (GIPC) with the aim of recognition of the top 100 companies and to encourage competition and improvement of company products and services in the country. It is based on the responses of a survey conducted annually by the GIPC, which companies can voluntarily participate in by submitting various information, including their financial statements. Due to the voluntary nature of the survey, in some years the number of companies listed has been fewer than 100. Most of the companies listed on the Ghana Stock Exchange are included in Ghana Club 100.

The Ghana Club 100 (or GC100) is about corporate excellence. Companies making it into the GC100 are to serve as role models for the private sector and provide a forum for corporate Ghana to interact with the government at a high level.

== Objectives ==
=== GC100 objectives ===
- Develop an open information culture within the Ghanaian corporate sector
- Provide incentives for improved performance
- Develop uniform criteria for evaluating this performance
- To establish an annual database of the top 100 performing companies.

== Eligibility criteria ==
- All entrants must be limited liability companies
- For companies with Government interest, Government ownership should be less than 50% unless the company is listed on the Ghana Stock Exchange

== Ranking methodology ==
According to GIPC, the following process is used to determine a company’s overall rank in the Ghana Club 100 list, (GC100);

- A weighted rank is calculated by applying the weights to a company’s rank on each of the following parameters:
1. Size
2. Profitability
3. Growth
- An overall rank of a company in the GC100 is then obtained from a company’s weighted average rank.
- A company’s growth is used as a tie-breaker to eliminate all ties in the ranking.

== Awards ==
There are awards for the top 100 businesses and for the leading companies in each of the following strategic sectors;

- Agriculture and Agribusiness
- Information and Communication Technology
- Financial Services
- Manufacturing
- Oil & Gas
- Services
- Infrastructure
- Mining
- Tourism
- Health and Education

There are also Special Awards for outstanding performance in Corporate Social Responsibility (CSR)

== Application procedure ==
Businesses who wish to be considered for the Ghana Club 100 Awards are required to submit the following documents:

- Audited Accounts for 3 past years
- 125 words soft copy of company profile and logo in jpeg/png format
- Soft copies (high resolution) of your CEO's passport size picture in jpeg/png format
- Current Business Registration Certificates.
- Current Tax and SNNIT Clearance Certificates
- Verified contacts of CEO and one other member of management for GC 100 database

== The 2019 edition ==
The top award of the list went out to MTN GH (Scancom Plc) and was presented by Nana Akufo-Addo the President of Ghana.

Below are the list of Winners for the 2019 Edition of the Ghana Club 100 awards;

1. Scancom Plc. (MTN)
2. Kosmos Energy Ghana
3. GOIL
4. Sunon Asogli Power Plant Ltd.
5. IT Consortium
6. ASA Savings and Loans
7. Total Petroleum Ghana Ltd.
8. Goldfields Ghana Ltd.
9. Olam Ghana Ltd.
10. Agro ECOM Ghana Ltd.
11. Anglogold Ashanti Aduapriem
12. Newmont Goldenrich Ghana Ltd.
13. Unilever Ghana Ltd.
14. GCNet
15. Newmont Ghana Gold Ltd.
16. GCB Bank Ltd.
17. Enterprise Trustees
18. Barclays Bank Ghana Ltd. subsidiary of ABSA
19. Metropolitan Health Insurance Ghana Ltd.
20. Ecobank Ghana Ltd.
21. B5 Plus Ltd.
22. Enterprise Life Company Ltd.
23. Poly Kraft Ghana Ltd.
24. Letshego Ghana Savings and Loans
25. Nexans Cable Metals Ltd.
26. Kiteko Ghana Ltd.
27. Maphlix Trust Ghana Ltd.
28. Afcott Ghana Ltd.
29. Stanbic Bank Ghana Ltd.
30. Standard Chartered Bank Ghana Ltd.
31. Fiaseman Rural Bank
32. Fidelity Bank Ghana Ltd.
33. Cal Bank
34. KEK Insurance Brokers
35. Melcom Ltd.
36. GTBank Ghana Ltd.
37. Microfin Rural Bank Ltd.
38. Papaye Ghana Ltd.
39. Landtours
40. Starlife Assurance
41. Nutrifoods
42. Goldfields Tarkwa and Damang mine
43. TekSol Ltd.
44. Niche Cocoa
45. Izwe Savings and Loans
46. Kane-Em Industries Ltd.
47. Glico Life Insurance Company Ltd.
48. Tobinco Pharmacy Ltd.
49. Sefwiman Rural Bank Ltd.
50. Atwima Mponua Rural Bank Ltd.
51. Amenfiman Rural Bank
52. Enterprise Insurance Company Ltd.
53. Societe Generale Ghana
54. L’aine services Ltd.
55. Bayport Savings and Loans
56. Fanmilk Ltd.
57. GHL Bank Ltd.
58. Poly Tanks
59. Ahantaman Rural Bank Ltd.
60. Manya Krobo Rural Bank Ltd.
61. Bosomtwe Rural Bank Ltd.
62. Sunu Assurances Ghana Ltd.
63. New Crystal Health Services Ltd.
64. South Akyem Rural Bank Ltd.
65. Builsa Community Bank Ltd.
66. Interplast Ltd.
67. Otuasekan Rural Bank Ltd.
68. Star Assurance Company Ltd.
69. Kaaseman Rural Bank Ltd.
70. Olam Cocoa Processing Ghana
71. G4S Security Services Ltd.
72. Upper Amenfi Rural Bank Ltd.
73. Activa International Insurance Company Ltd.
74. SIC Insurance Company Ltd.
75. Glico Healthcare Ltd.
76. Leasafric Ghana Ltd.
77. Juaben Rural Bank Ltd.
78. Atwima Kwanwoma Rural Bank Ltd.
79. Crocodile Matchets Ghana Ltd.
80. Ghana Rubber Estates Ltd.
81. Prudential Life Insurance Ghana Ltd.
82. Amansie West Rural Bank Ltd.
83. Amanano Rural Bank Ltd.
84. Tropical Cables and Conductors Ltd.
85. Odotobri Rural Bank Ltd.
86. Kintampo Rural Bank Ltd.
87. Bawjiase Area Rural Bank Ltd.
88. M&G Pharmaceuticals Ltd.
89. Guinness Ghana Breweries Ltd.
90. Kasapreko Company Ltd.
91. Asokori Rural Bank Ltd.
92. Anum Rural Bank
93. Access Bank
94. Akuapim Rural Bank Ltd.
95. Asante Akyem Rural Bank Ltd.
96. ADB Bank
97. Starwin Products Ltd.
98. Glico General Insurance Company Ltd.
99. Acacia Health Insurance
100. Japan Motors Trading Company Ltd.
