= GSE Composite Index =

Ghanaian stock market index

The principal stock index of the Ghana Stock Exchange or GSE is the GSE Composite Index. It was introduced in 2011 with a base value of 1000 points. This index is calculated from the values of each of the market's listings.

== Market listings ==
As of August 2014 there are 38 listings and 2 corporate bonds:
Symbol	Company	Notes (Products)
AADs	AngloGold Ashanti	Exploration, development and mining of gold worldwide
ACI	African Champion Industries	Manufacture of toilet rolls, printing, typing and writing papers
ABL	Accra Brewery Company	Brewery; Manufacturer of Beer and dry stout
AGA	AngloGold Ashanti	Exploration, development and mining of gold worldwide
ALW	Aluworks	Production and sale of aluminium based products, which consist of aluminium sheet-in-coil, circles, flat sheets, louver blades, corrugated roofing sheets
AYRTN	Ayrton Drugs	Pharmaceutical
BOPP	Benso Oil Palm Plantation	Producing and processing crude palm oil
CAL	CAL Banks	Financial services
CLYD	Clydestone Ghana	Information technology
CMLT	Camelot Ghana	Printing
CPC	Cocoa Processing Company	Processing of Cocoa Beans into finished products for export and local consumption
EBG	Ecobank Ghana (Ecobank)	Financial services
EGL	Enterprise Insurance	Insurance Underwriters - Non Banking Financial Institution, Provision of insurance services and insurer in fire, marine, motor and general accident
ETI	Ecobank Transnational (Ecobank)	Financial services
FML	Fan Milk	Production of dairy products such as Fanyogo, Fanmilk and Fanice in various flavours
GCB	Ghana Commercial Bank	Financial services
GGBL	Guinness Ghana Breweries	Production of Guinness Extra Stout, Star Beer, Gulder, etc and non-alcoholic liquor "Malta Guinness and Amstel Malta"
GOIL	Ghana Oil Company	Marketing and Distribution of Petroleum Products
GSR	Golden Star Resources	Mining (mine development and gold exploration in Ghana and West Africa)
GWEB	Golden Web	Edible oil
HFC	HFC Bank	Investment management and savings
MAC	Mega African Capital Limited	Investment, representative of many Investors
MLC	Mechanical Lloyd	Automobile dealer, representative of many Automobile Manufacturers
PBC	Produce Buying Company	To purchase cocoa beans from farmers, and to store them in purpose-built sheds at village/society level, then cart the cocoa beans to collection points for inspection, grading and sealing by the Ghana Cocoa Board's Quality Control Department
PKL	Pioneer Kitchenware	Production of aluminium household wares such as Heavy Casseroles etc
PZC	PZ Cussons Ghana (PZ Cussons)	Manufactureers of over-the-counter pharmaceutical preparations, cosmetics and beauty products
SCB	Standard Chartered Bank Ghana (Standard Chartered Bank)	Financial services
SCB PREF	Standard Chartered Bank Ghana (Standard Chartered Bank)	Financial services
SOGEGH	Société Générale Ghana	financial services
SIC	SIC Insurance Company	Insurers and reinsurers generally for risks of every type and description
SPL	Starwin Products	Pharmaceutical
SWL	Sam Woode Limited	Publishing, printing and related businesses
TBL (The Gambia)	Trust Bank Limited (Gambia)	Financial services
TLW	Tullow Oil	Oil and Gas Exploration
TOTAL	Total Petroleum Ghana (Total S.A.)	Marketing of petroleum products and services
TRANSOL	Transol Solutions Ghana	Prepaid vouchers, third-party billing, automated teller machine services
UNIL	Unilever Ghana (Unilever)	Manufacturing of soaps, detergents, foods, personal products, distribution and service enterprises
UTB	UT Bank	General financing services, forfeiting and factoring, export financing and borrowing from the market

== Profiles of listed companies ==
=== AADs ===
AADs is symbol representing AngloGold Ashanti Limited on the Ghana Stock Exchange. It was listed on the Stock Exchange on 27 April 2004. Its traded securities are ordinary shares of no par value. AADs has a total of four million (4,000,000) authorised shares and 978,000 issued shares. As of 19 August 2014, its stated capital was US $3,364,000,000.

=== ACI ===
ACI is symbol representing African Champion Industries Limited on the Ghana Stock Exchange. It was listed on the Stock Exchange on 2 May 1992. Its traded securities are ordinary shares of no par value. ACI has a total of 500 million authorised shares and 36.603 million issued shares. As of 19 August 2014, its stated capital was GH¢1,505.455.

=== AGA ===
AGA is symbol representing AngloGold Ashanti Limited on the Ghana Stock Exchange. It was listed on the Stock Exchange on 27 April 2004. Its traded securities are ordinary shares of no par value. AGA has a total of six million (600,000,000) authorised shares and 403,364,237 issued shares. As of 19 August 2014, its stated capital was ZAR 49,342,276,064.06.

=== ALW ===
ALW is symbol representing Aluworks Ltd. on the Ghana Stock Exchange. It was listed on the Stock Exchange on 29 November 2004. Its traded securities are ordinary shares of no par value. ALW has a total of one billion (1,000,000,000) authorised shares and 236,687,001 issued shares. As of 19 August 2014, its stated capital was GH¢31,650,000.

=== AYRTN ===
AYRTN is symbol representing Ayrton Drugs Manufacturing Company Ltd. on the Ghana Stock Exchange. It was listed on the Stock Exchange on 27 April 2004. Its traded securities are equity. AYRTN has a total of 500,000,000 authorised shares and 180,000,000 issued shares. As of 19 August 2014, its stated capital was GH¢1500.

=== BOPP ===
BOPP is symbol representing Benso Oil Palm Plantation Limited on the Ghana Stock Exchange. It was listed on the Stock Exchange on 16 April 2004. Its traded securities are ordinary shares of no par value. BOPP has a total of 50,000,000 authorised shares of no par value and 34,800,000 issued shares. As of 19 August 2014, its stated capital was GH¢2,000,000.

=== CAL ===
CAL is symbol representing CAL Bank Limited on the Ghana Stock Exchange. It was listed on the Stock Exchange on 5 November 2004. Its traded securities are ordinary shares of no par value. CAL has a total of one billion (1,000,000,000) authorised shares and 548,261,549 issued shares. As of 19 August 2014, its stated capital was GH¢100,000,000.

=== CLYD ===
CLYD is symbol representing Clydestone Limited on the Ghana Stock Exchange. It was listed on the Stock Exchange on 19 May 2004. Its traded securities are ordinary shares of no par value. CYLD has a total of one hundred million (100,000,000) authorised shares of no par value and 5,548,500,000 issued shares. As of 19 August 2014, its stated capital was GH¢554,850.

=== CMLT ===
CMLT is symbol representing Camelot Ghana Limited on the Ghana Stock Exchange. It was listed on the Stock Exchange on 17 September 1999. Its traded securities are ordinary shares of no par value. CMLT has a total of twenty million (20,000,000) authorised shares and 6,829,276 issued shares. As of 19 August 2014, its stated capital was GH¢217,467.

=== CPC ===
CPC is symbol representing Cocoa Processing Company on the Ghana Stock Exchange. It was listed on the Stock Exchange on 14 February 2003. Its traded securities are ordinary shares of no par value. CPC has a total of 20,000,000,000 authorised shares and 1,100,826,240 issued shares. As of 19 August 2014, its stated capital was GH¢16,778,315.

=== EGH ===
EGH is symbol representing Ecobank Ghana Limited on the Ghana Stock Exchange. It was listed on the Stock Exchange in July 2006. Its traded securities are ordinary shares. EGH has a total of 500 million authorised shares and 293,228,372 issued shares. As of 19 August 2014, its stated capital was GH¢226.64 million.

=== EGL ===
EGL is symbol representing Enterprise Group Limited on the Ghana Stock Exchange. It was listed on the Stock Exchange on 21 February 1992. Its traded securities are ordinary shares of no par value. EGL has a total of 200 million authorised shares and 131,210,825 issued shares. As of 19 August 2014, its stated capital was GH¢31,599,000.00.

=== ETI ===
ETI is symbol representing Ecobank Transnational Incorporation on the Ghana Stock Exchange. It was listed on the Stock Exchange on 11 September 2006. Its traded securities are equities. ETI has a total of 800,000,000 authorised shares and 17,213 Billion issued shares. As of 19 August 2014, its stated capital was US$867,714,000.

=== FML ===
FML is symbol representing Fan Milk Limited on the Ghana Stock Exchange. It was listed on the Stock Exchange on 18 October 1991. Its traded securities are ordinary shares of no par value. FML has a total of 200 million authorised shares and 118,707,288 issued shares. As of 19 August 2014, its stated capital was GH¢10,000,000.00.

=== GCB ===
GCB is symbol representing Ghana Commercial Bank Limited on the Ghana Stock Exchange. It was listed on the Stock Exchange on 17 May 1996. Its traded securities are ordinary shares of no par value. GCB has 1,500,000,000 authorised shares and 265,000,000 issued shares. As of 19 August 2014, its stated capital was GH¢72,000,000.

=== GGBL ===
GGBL is symbol representing Guinness Ghana Breweries Limited on the Ghana Stock Exchange. It was listed on the Stock Exchange on 23 August 1991. Its traded securities are ordinary shares of no par value. EGL has a total of 200 million authorised shares and 211,338,142 issued shares. As of 19 August 2014, its stated capital was GH¢26,252,000.

=== GOIL ===
GOIL is symbol representing Ghana Oil Company Limited on the Ghana Stock Exchange. It was listed on the Stock Exchange on 16 November 2007. Its traded securities are ordinary shares of no par value. GOIL has a total of 1,000,000,000 authorised shares and 252.22 million issued shares. As of 19 August 2014, its stated capital was GH¢31,809,265.00.

=== GSR ===
GSR is symbol representing Golden Star Resources Limited on the Ghana Stock Exchange. It was listed on the Stock Exchange on 15 February 2008. Its traded securities are ordinary shares of no par value. GSR has Unlimited (Under Canadian Law) authorised shares and 259,105,970 issued shares. As of 19 August 2014, its stated capital was US $520,320,000.

=== GWEB ===
GWEB is symbol representing Golden Web Ltd. on the Ghana Stock Exchange. It was listed on the Stock Exchange on 29 August 2005. Its traded securities are ordinary shares of no par value. GWEB has a total of 750,000,000 authorised shares and 29.966,304 issued shares. As of 19 August 2014, its stated capital was GH¢31,809,265.00.

=== HFC ===
HFC is symbol representing HFC Bank Limited on the Ghana Stock Exchange. It was listed on the Stock Exchange on 17 March 1995. Its traded securities are ordinary shares of no par value. HFC has a total of 1 billion authorised shares and 296,080,918 issued shares. As of 12 September 2014, its stated capital was GH¢95,000,624.

=== MAC ===
MAC is symbol representing Mega African Capital Limited on the Ghana Stock Exchange. It was listed on the Stock Exchange on 23 April 2014. Its traded securities are ordinary shares. MAC has a total of 8,641,469 issued shares. As of 12 September 2014, its stated capital was GH¢11,820,922.

=== MLC ===
MLC is symbol representing Mechanical Lloyd Company Limited on the Ghana Stock Exchange. It was listed on the Stock Exchange on 10 May 1994. Its traded securities are ordinary shares of no par value. MLC has a total of 100 million authorised shares and 50,095,925 issued shares. As of 12 September 2014, its stated capital was GH¢2,771,486.00.

=== PKL ===
PKL is symbol representing Pioneer Kitchenware Limited on the Ghana Stock Exchange. It was listed on the Stock Exchange on 25 August 1995. Its traded securities are ordinary shares of no par value. PKL has a total of 100 million authorised shares and 33.34 million issued shares. As of 12 September 2014, its stated capital was GH¢866,201.

=== PZC ===
PZC is symbol representing PZ Cussons Ghana Limited on the Ghana Stock Exchange. It was listed on the Stock Exchange on 12 November 1990. Its traded securities are ordinary shares of no par value. PZC has a total of 200 million authorised shares and 168,000,000 issued shares. As of 12 September 2014, its stated capital was GH¢2,160,000.

=== SCB ===
SCB is symbol representing Standard Chartered Bank Ghana Limited on the Ghana Stock Exchange. It was formally listed on the Stock Exchange on 23 August 1991. Its traded securities are ordinary and preference shares. SCB has a total of 250 million authorised shares(Ordinary) and issued shares consist of 115,507,284 million ordinary shares and 17,486,083 million preference shares. As of 12 September 2014, its stated capital was GH¢52,541,000 Ordinary Shares and GH¢9,090,000 Preference shares; total is GH¢61,631,000.

=== SCB PREF ===
SCB PREF is symbol representing Standard Chartered Bank Ghana Limited on the Ghana Stock Exchange. It was formally listed on the Stock Exchange on 23 August 1991. Its traded securities are ordinary and preference shares. SCB PREF has a total of 250 million authorised shares(Ordinary) and issued shares consist of 115,507,284 million ordinary shares and 17,486,083 million preference shares. As of 12 September 2014, its stated capital was GH¢52,541,000 Ordinary Shares and GH¢9,090,000 Preference shares; total is GH¢61,631,000.

=== SIC ===
SIC is symbol representing SIC Insurance Company Limited on the Ghana Stock Exchange. It was listed on the Stock Exchange on 25 January 2008. Its traded securities are ordinary shares of no par value. SIC has a total of 500 million authorised shares and 195,645,000 issued shares. As of 12 September 2014, its stated capital was GH¢2,500,000.

=== SOGEGH ===
SOGEGH is symbol representing Societe Generale Ghana Limited on the Ghana Stock Exchange. It was listed on the Stock Exchange on 13 October 1995. Its traded securities are ordinary shares of no par value. SOGEGH has a total of 500 million authorised shares and 333,393,894 issued shares. As of 12 September 2014, its stated capital was GH¢62,393,557.80.

=== SPL ===
SPL is symbol representing Starwin Products Limited on the Ghana Stock Exchange. It was listed on the Stock Exchange on 29 December 2004. Its traded securities are ordinary shares of no par value. SPL has a total of 500 million authorised shares and 74,244,825 issued shares. As of 12 September 2014, its stated capital was GH¢1,982,028.

=== SWL ===
SWL is symbol representing Sam Wood Limited on the Ghana Stock Exchange. It was listed on the Stock Exchange on 24 April 2002. SWL has a total of 100 million authorised shares and 21,828,035 issued shares. As of 12 September 2014, its stated capital was GH¢220,990.

=== TBL ===
TBL is symbol representing Trust Bank Limited (The Gambia) on the Ghana Stock Exchange. It was listed on the Stock Exchange on 15 November 2002. Its traded securities are ordinary shares of no par value. TBL has a total of 200 million authorised shares and 200,000,000 issued shares. As of 12 September 2014, its stated capital was Dalasis 200,000,000.

=== TLW ===
TLW is symbol representing Tullow Oil Plc on the Ghana Stock Exchange. It was listed on the Stock Exchange on 27 July 2011. Its traded securities are ordinary shares of no par value. TLW has a total of 903,846,948 issued shares. As of 12 September 2014, its stated capital was GH¢109,477,926.

=== TOTAL ===
TOTAL is symbol representing Total Petroleum Ghana Limited on the Ghana Stock Exchange. It was listed on the Stock Exchange on 19 July 1991. Its traded securities are ordinary shares of no par value. TOTAL has a total of 50 million authorised shares and 13,948,259 issued shares. As of 12 September 2014, its stated capital was GH¢49,722,000.

=== TRANSOL ===
TRANSOL is symbol representing Transol Solutions Ghana Limited on the Ghana Stock Exchange. It was listed on the Stock Exchange on 29 December 2006. Its traded securities are equity shares. TRANSOL has a total of 1 billion authorised shares and 80,000,000 issued shares. As of 12 September 2014, its stated capital was GH¢2,150,000.

=== UNIL ===
UNIL is symbol representing Unilever Ghana Limited on the Ghana Stock Exchange. It was formally listed on the Stock Exchange on 23 August 1991. UNIL has a total of 100 million authorised shares and 62.5 million issued shares. As of 12 September 2014, its stated capital was GH¢1,200,000.

=== UTB ===
UTB is symbol representing UT Bank Limited on the Ghana Stock Exchange. It was listed on the Stock Exchange on 25 November 2008. Its traded securities are ordinary shares of no par value. UTB has a total of 750 million authorised shares and 456,310,181 issued shares. As of 12 September 2014, its stated capital was GH¢85,275,000.

== See also ==
- Economy of Ghana
- Ghana Stock Exchange
- List of African stock exchanges
