= PZ Cussons Ghana =

- Type: Public
- Traded as: GSE: PZC
- Industry: Cosmetics, Soaps, Gels, Dairy, Household chemicals, & Natural Oils
- Founded: May 24, 1958
- Headquarters: PZ Cussons Ghana Ltd, No. 15 Kwame Nkrumah Avenue, Accra, Greater Accra, Ghana
- Key people: P. K. Pepera (Chairman); Sekar Ramamoorthy (MD)
- Products: Imperial Leather, Soaps, Shampoos, Gels, Milk, Olive Oil, Detergents & Healthcare Products.
- Parent: PZ Cussons
- Website: pzcussonsghana.com

PZ Cussons Ghana (GSE: PZC) is a major manufacturer of personal healthcare products, and consumer goods. It operates in Ghana, and is a subsidiary of PZ Cussons. They are listed on the stock index of the Ghana Stock Exchange, the GSE All-Share Index. It formed on May 24, 1958.

== History ==
PZ Cussons Ghana Limited is one of the early Companies that was first listed on the Ghana Stock Exchange (GSE) at the inception of the stock exchange in the early 1990s. The company, which started operations in the then Gold Coast in the 1930s, begun as a trading concern which imported goods from Europe for distribution and sale in the Gold Coast and West Africa as a whole. The company also engaged in the export of produce from the West African region to Europe.

== Operations ==
PZ Cussons Ghana Limited manufactures, distributes and sells soaps, cosmetics and over-the-counter pharmaceutical preparations. The company's products are for export and also for local Ghanaian consumption.
