= PKL (disambiguation) =

PKL is an acronym for Pro Kabaddi League, a men's professional Kabaddi league of India.

It may also refer to:

- Papert Koenig Lois, an American advertising agency from 1960 to 1969
- PKL, a Digital Cinema Package file type
- PKL, stock ticker symbol for Pioneer Kitchenware
- PKL, the Protestant Church of Luxembourg
- PKL, an alias for the PKLR enzyme
- PKL, Panchkula, Haryana, India
- PKL, Pedagang Kaki Lima, an Indonesian term for hawker
