= Social Security and National Insurance Trust =

Agency of the government of Ghana

SSNIT
- Social Security and National Insurance Trust
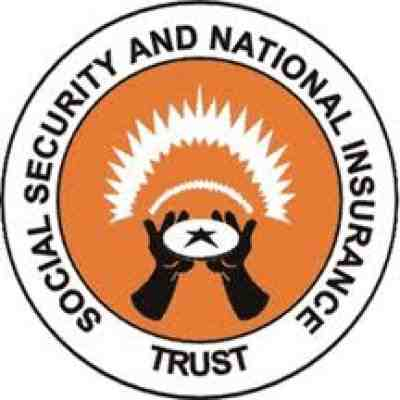
- Official seal

Agency overview
- Formed: 1965
- Jurisdiction: Republic of Ghana
- Headquarters: Accra, Greater Accra Region, Ghana
- Employees: 2,200
- Agency executives: Dr Kwame Addo Kufuor, Chairman, Board of Trustees; Dr. John Ofori-Tenkorang, Director-General
- Website: www.ssnit.org.gh

The Social Security and National Insurance Trust is an agency of the government of Ghana. Its job description, according to its website, is to administrate the National Pension Scheme. In so doing, the trust owns major amounts of stock in Ghana's principal companies.

== History ==
The Trust was founded in 1972 according to NRCD 127, with the purpose of managing the National Social Security Scheme. Before 1972, the Scheme was jointly managed by the Department of Pensions and the State Insurance Corporation. The Trust used to manage the Social Security Scheme as a Provident Fund Scheme until 1991. After that, it changed to a Social Insurance Pension Scheme, which was governed by the PNDC law 247. In Ghana, there were changes made to the pension system by a law called Act 766 of 2008. This new system was put into action in January 2010, replacing all existing pension schemes in Ghana, including Cap 30. Later, in 2014, the National Pensions (Amendment) Act 883 was passed to modify some parts of Act 766.

The Trust's vision is “to be the model for the administration of Social Protection Schemes in Africa and beyond” and its mission is “to provide income security for workers in Ghana through excellent business practices”.

== Investments ==
=== Stock Portfolio ===
For example, the trust owns:

- 10% of Accra Brewery Company Limited;
- 25% of Aluworks;
- 30% of Ghana Commercial Bank;
- 20% of HFC Bank; and
- 20% of SG-SSB (SG Social Security Bank).
- 10% of Africa World Airlines;
- 40% of West Hills Mall.

== End of lump sum payment ==
From 1 January 2020 all workers who attain the age of 60 years would not receive the lump sum payment anymore as was stated in PNDC Law 247. The lump sum payments had been transferred to the second tier fund managers.

== Self-employed Enrolment Drive (SEED) ==
To help self-employed person to join the pension scheme, SSNIT introduced the Self-employed Enrolment Drive (SEED) initiative. The Self-Employed Enrolment Drive (SEED) is a program designed to encourage self-employed individuals and informal sector workers to join the SSNIT Scheme and make regular contributions based on their full earnings. Self-employed workers aged 15 to 45 who have never been members of the SSNIT Scheme can register and start contributing. Additionally, individuals who previously worked in the formal sector and are now self-employed, regardless of their age, can reactivate their accounts to resume contributions or monthly premium payments, ensuring eligibility for a pension.
