= Afare Apeadu Donkor =

Former Ghanaian Diplomat and Banker

Ghana Ambassador to China
- Appointed by: Government of Ghana

Afare Apeadu Donkor, Amb (born February 10) is a Ghanaian diplomat and banker. He is the founding chief executive of Cal Bank Ghana and also the former ambassador of Ghana to China during the administration led by John Kufour.

== Early life and education ==
Afare was born in 1940s and hails from Aburi Akuapim. He attended Prempeh College, but left after a year to Konongo Odumase Senior High School. He is also an alumnus of the University of Ghana, where he obtained a Bachelor's degree in economics.

== Career ==
In July 1990, he founded Calbank as a local merchant bank. He led the bank to acquire its International Banking license in 2003 before handing over to Frank Adu Jr.

In 2017, he contested as the Eastern Region representative for the council of State but lost to Nana Somuah Mireku.

== Philanthropy ==
In 2015, Afare donated books to the University of Ghana Economics department and Balme Library in a bid to enhance learning.
