= J. K. Siaw =

Ghanaian businessman (1923–1986)

Joshua Kwabena Siaw, popularly known as J. K. Siaw (January 1923 – October 1986), was a Ghanaian industrialist and philanthropist, who in 1969 established Tata Brewery Ltd. – now known as Guinness Ghana Breweries, also as Achimota Brewery Company (ABC). He is notable for opening the largest wholly African-owned brewery company in West Africa in 1973. In 1979 all his assets were confiscated by the AFRC regime of Ghana under false allegations of tax evasion. He died in London, in exile, in October 1986.

== Early life ==
Joshua Kwabena Siaw was born in Obomeng, a small town in the Eastern Region of Ghana, in January 1923. His father came from Akwaseho and his mother from Juaben in the Ashanti Region. J. K. Siaw worked with his father on a cocoa farm before attending school, aged 12, in 1935, and he took to basket-making as a way to make more money to further his own education.

== Career ==
=== Teacher ===
In 1942, aged 19, Siaw became a teacher of Standard One class in Akwaseho. After a couple of months he went to work at the Orthodox Mission School and then to the Bremang Gold Dredging Company near Bogoso, in Ghana's Western Region. After just one month, he went to Effiduase Banko to work again as a teacher from June 1943 to March 1945. Siaw then went to work at the New Juaben Grammar School but left after a year because the headmaster, Mr. Sarkodea, was mismanaging the school. Siaw established Christ College in 1946 with his father, before apprenticing with a pharmacist for a year. Christ College evolved into Ghana Secondary School in Effiduase by 1976.

=== Cocoa broker ===
Siaw then decided to go into business and borrowed £50 (£1500.00 in 2013 relative value) to start up as a cocoa broker. In four months he had made £600 (£18,000.00 in 2013 relative value) profit. In April 1950 he became a siding clerk at Kwahu Praso, transporting cocoa to Accra, Ghana's capital. He repaid the £200 security charge for the clerking employment with interest in six months and was bound for a further six months, by contract, but he decided to stay for only four. In 1953 he worked as a siding clerk, this time for the Cocoa Purchasing Company, which paid £6 a month. He became a cocoa and timber transporter in 1954.

=== Entrepreneur ===
In 1957, he began selling enamelware until the Government of Ghana under Kwame Nkrumah banned the importation of those goods.

In 1964, Siaw's first request to the government to be granted permission to set up a brewery was rejected. He applied again in 1967 and that application too was rejected on the grounds that licences had been given to Ashanti and Takoradi breweries. Despite being offered an investment of 400,000 cedis from Siaw, Takoradi brewery could not happen.

== Tata Brewery ==
A third application to the government to set up a brewery was successful and approved 26 July 1969. The approval was given to "Tata Trading Company" to establish a brewery in Cape Coast in the Central Region, Ghana, "a place of fashion, scholarship, and beauty". A suitable site could not be found in Cape Coast and the project was relocated to Achimota, a town on the Accra-Nsawam Road.

The new National Redemption Council (NRC) government attempted to renegotiate the competing interests of the state, local businessmen, workers, and foreign capital. Loans and tax incentives were promised to Ghanaian businessmen who went into manufacturing.

Tata Brewery Ltd was commissioned on 30 January 1973, Siaw's 50th birthday. It was officially opened by the then Head of State Colonel Ignatius Kutu Acheampong, who said of the event: "It is the single-minded and single-handed effort of Mr. J. K. Siaw... which has been responsible for what we see around us today. Mr. Siaw is an excellent example of the innate ability of the Ghanaian to rise to the needs of the occasion". Siaw had wanted "his Brewery to stand for centuries to come", "even longer than the famous Christiansborg Castle". J. K. Siaw, established Tata Brewery Limited, the first fully Ghanaian-owned brewery in the country.

Tata Company secured exclusive export rights for the "Maltex" drink to neighbouring Togo, Dahomey (Benin), Upper Volta (Burkina Faso), Ivory Coast, Sierra Leone, Liberia, Senegal, and The Gambia from Albani Breweries Limited, a Danish firm operating in Ghana. The company was the first brewery to introduce draught beer into the country.

The Ghana Commercial Bank provided a loan of 950,000 cedis for the project to begin, with a pre-requisite that Siaw deposited 200,000 cedis. By 1976, the brewery employed 750 Ghanaians and only four expatriates. Siaw produced his own brand of beer - Tata Pilsner Beer.

"In the country's bid to industrialize, the alcohol industry has played a pioneering role."

=== Modern Continental Bank ===
August 25, 1977 J.K Siaw formed The Modern Continental Bank together with Mr Kwadwo Ohene-Ampofo a legal practitioner.

=== Philanthropy ===
For the workers and their families there was a clinic, a subsidised canteen and free transport to work. Siaw sought to build housing for the workers not too far from the site. Vaccinations were provided free of charge to the workers and their families.

Siaw presented to the Korle-Bu Teaching Hospital an electro-cardiograph, a piece of equipment the hospital was deficient of.

Siaw also donated towards the construction of a hospital in Akwaseho in 1975 and begun the building of a road from Akwaseho to Obomeng, a project that ceased when the 1979 AFRC regime seized his assets. No subsequent governments have completed the road.

Siaw was the subject of a book by J. Benibengor Blay entitled The Story of Tata (c.1976).

== 1979: AFRC regime ==
See Armed Forces Revolutionary Council, Ghana

Siaw was among the businessmen targeted by the AFRC under the "house cleaning" exercise against corruption. The AFRC were under the impression that Ghana's wealthiest businessmen, of whom J. K. Siaw was the most prominent, must have acquired their wealth through corruption facilitated by the country's former leaders, including Lt. Gen. Akwasi Afrifa, Gen. Acheampong and Lt. Gen. Fred Akuffo, who were all executed. During the short time that the Armed Forces Revolutionary Council was the government of Ghana (4 June 1979 until 24 September 1979), Siaw was arrested on numerous occasions, and his house looted. Junior soldiers raided his properties for a catalogue of items, including a £3000.00 gold watch (£33000.00 in 2013 relative value), until he was released secretly by a junior soldier and left for Liberia.

The tax-evasion charges totalled ¢10 million (as of 1979) however, they were false allegations.

== Life in exile ==
=== Liberia Brewery ===
Following from the upheaval in Ghana in 1979, Siaw started again in Liberia, which by comparison to Ghana was a very safe and peaceful country in West Africa at the time.

=== PNDC petitions ===
Siaw petitioned the PNDC government, which came into power with the overthrow of the government of Hilla Limann, who had been supported by the AFRC in the 1979 elections. The PNDC government systematically targeted businesses of other businessmen as well as Siaw. The National Investigation Committee, created in 1982, was created to investigate corruption in public office. It reviewed cases of persons whose assets were confiscated by the state during the three-month rule of the AFRC. The NIC "found that the confiscation of all the assets of J. K. Siaw, owner of the former Tata Brewery, on the grounds that he engaged in over-invoicing and under-invoicing during the Acheampong period was a travesty of justice".

== Death ==
Siaw left Liberia to live in South London, until he died in October 1986. He had sent numerous petitions to the military government PNDC and had applied for safe entry to be allowed back into Ghana without risk of arrest. His body was flown back to Ghana in December of that year. He did not receive his assets back and was considered a criminal by the state, despite the allegations being baseless.

== Return of property and compensation issue ==
In the 1990s under the NDC government, successor to the PNDC government and AFRC, Tata Brewery (by then Achimota Brewery Company) was privatised. The International Finance Corporation provided a US$3.5 million loan and a US$1 million equity investment to help finance the US$24.5 million privatization, rehabilitation, and expansion of Achimota Brewery Company (ABC) in Accra, Ghana. The sale of the brewery by the Government of Ghana represented the largest non-mining privatization in Ghana by that time. The IFC also acquired an 11% stake in the business.

J. K. Siaw's family have not since received any compensation for the ordeal that they went through. --->Ghana's subsequent NPP government announced its intention to compensate victims of the previous military regimes and return some seized assets In 2008, the then government returned eight houses to the family on a "where is, as is basis", meaning they were made to accept the properties in the condition the government was prepared to return them. It was hinted that compensation would be paid to those whose properties were sold, yet despite Tata Brewery being sold twice since confiscation the family received no compensation on that single property, nor on the list of items looted from Siaw's numerous properties.
