= Transol Solutions Ghana =

- Company type: Public
- Traded as: GSE: TRANSOL
- Industry: Electronics
- Founded: July 8, 2002
- Headquarters: Transol Solutions Ghana, 1st Floor Ahemansa House, 5 Lamb Road, Accra, Greater Accra, Ghana
- Key people: Paul Tse Jacquaye; Chairman; Frank Kofi Opata; CEO
- Services: Prepaid vouchers, third-party billing, automated teller machine services
- Website: www.transolghana.com

Transol Solutions Ghana (GSE: TRANSOL), also known simply and stylized as TranSol, is a Ghanaian electronics company. They are listed on the stock index of the Ghana Stock Exchange, the GSE All-Share Index. It formed on July 8, 2002.

== Operations ==
Transactions Solutions Ghana, provides electronic funds transfer (EFT) infrastructure and support services, third party payments, teller machine services, prepaid voucher and top-up products.
