= Fan Milk =

Ghanaian ice cream manufacturer

- Company type: Public
- Traded as: GSE: FML
- Genre: Ice Cream
- Founded: 1960
- Headquarters: Ghana
- Key people: Danish investors
- Products: Milk, Ice Cream, Yoghurt and Ice lollies
- Total assets: 3250 + shareholders (2003)
- Parent: Danone
- Website: fanmilk.danone.com

Fan Milk is a Ghana based manufacturer and retailer of ice cream and frozen dairy products, In July 2019, Danone, previously a joint shareholder with The Abraaj Group, increased its stake to 100% and thus assumed complete ownership of the company.

== History ==
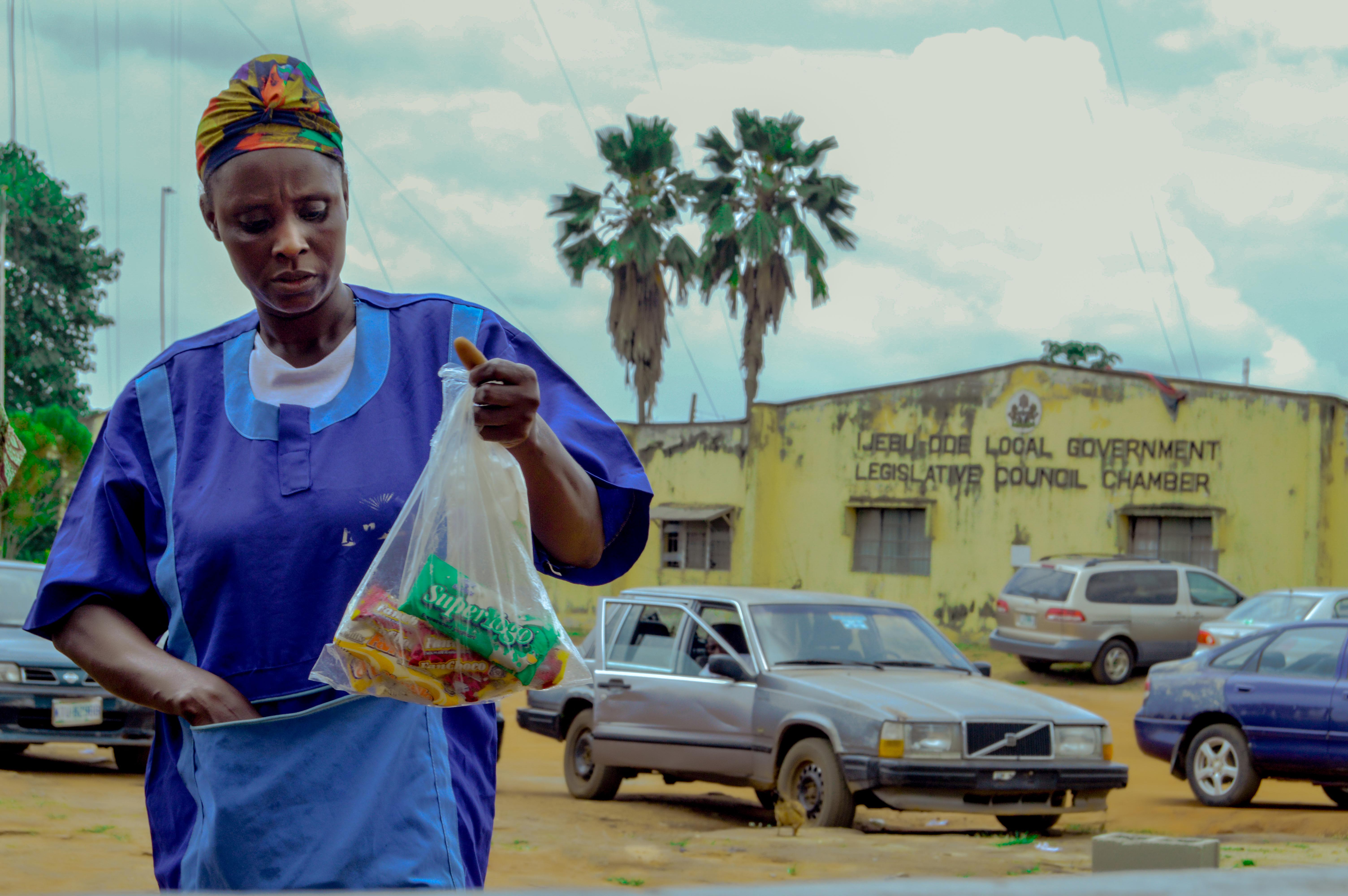
A woman selling Fan Milk products in Ijebu Ode

Fan Milk Limited is a Ghanaian dairy retailer based in Accra that's listed on the Ghana Stock Exchange and the GSE All-Share Index. Since its inception in 1960 the company has commenced operations in Benin, Togo and Burkina Faso. Previously known as the Ghanaian Milk Company, they ascertained Danish investment in the early 1960s and initially specialized in pasteurised milk. However, in 1962, the company changed its name to Fan Milk Limited and branched out into the production of ice cream, yoghurt, ice lollies and other frozen dairy products.

Fan Milk Limited was the first foreign-invested company in Ghana to become a Public Limited Liability in 1967 and among the first companies to be listed on the Ghana Stock Exchange on 18 October 1991 with the symbol FML. As of 2003, it had over 3,250 shareholders.

== Ownership ==
As of December 2003, Fan Milk's top shareholders were Fan Milk International Denmark with 7,365,955 shares as in 37.23%, the Danish Industrialization Fund For Developing Countries with 4,954,420 shares as in 25.04%, and Enterprise Insurance with 1,978,472 shares being 10% of the company. At that stage Fan Milk International Denmark, the Danish Industrialization Fund for Developing Companies and Enterprise Insurance each owned a 37.23%, 25.04% and 10% stake of Fan Milk Ghana respectively.

In 2013, The Abraaj Group and Danone became joint owners of Fan Milk, obtaining a 51% and 49% stake in the company, respectively. Danone eventually became a majority shareholder in 2016. On July 30, 2019, Danone acquired Abraaj's remaining 49% shares, increasing its stake to 100% and thus assuming complete ownership of the company.

== Products ==
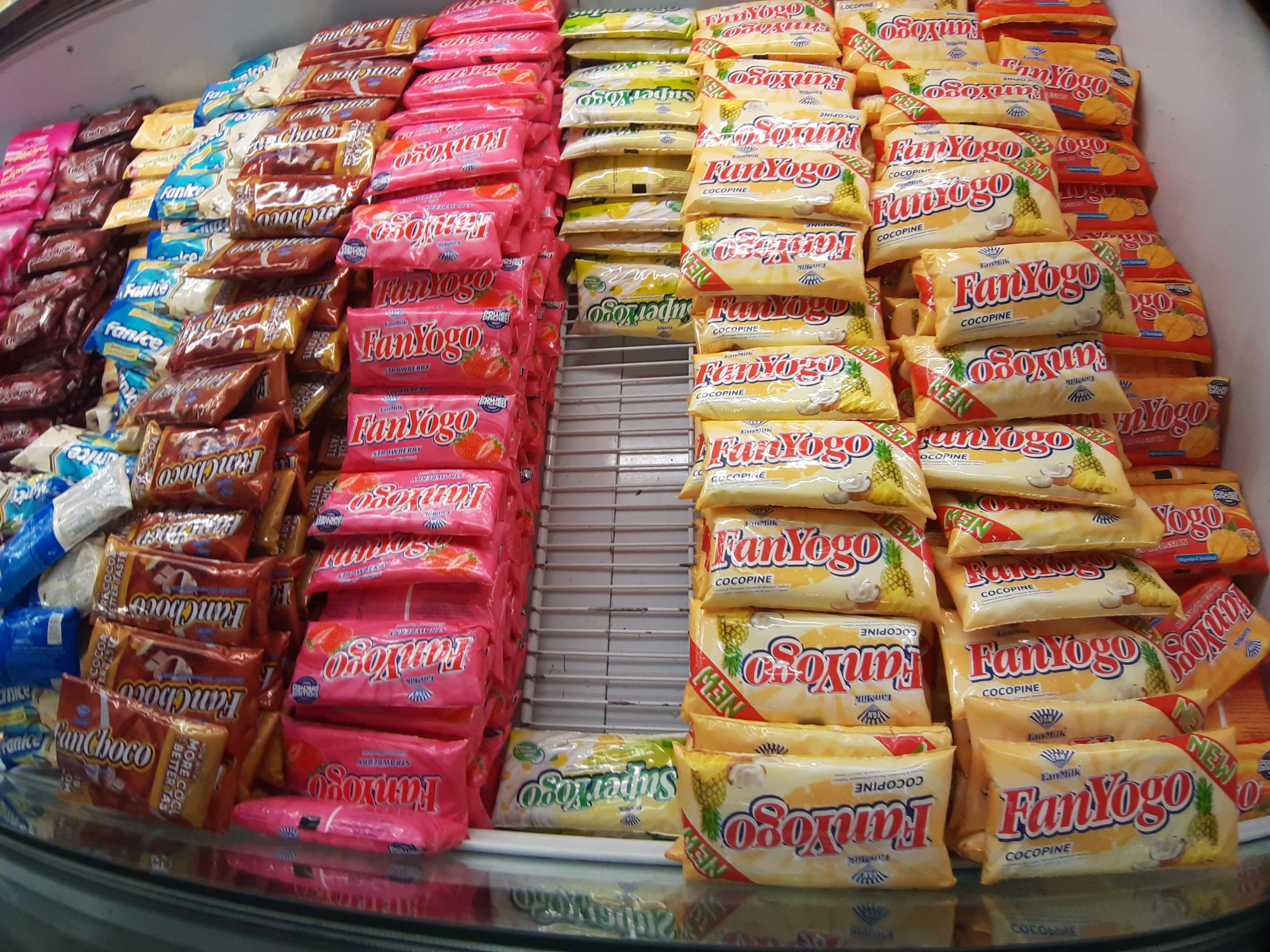
A range of Fan Milk products

- Fanice (150mL Pouch)
- FanGold
- FanYogo (Strawberry, mango & passion)
- FanChoco
- FanDango
- FanVanille (Togo, Benin)
- Fanmaxx (Ghana)
- FanYogo (Strawberry, Banana Flavour)
