= Camelot Ghana =

Ghanaian printing company

- Company type: Public limited company
- Traded as: GSE: CMLT
- Industry: Printing
- Founded: 1963
- Headquarters: Camelot Ghana Ltd, Osu-La Road, Osu, Accra, Ghana
- Key people: Elizabeth Joyce Villars; Chairman; John Colin Villars; CEO
- Products: Printing, Stationery
- Website: www.camelotprint.com

Camelot Ghana is a Ghanaian printing company, serving the West Africa market. The company was founded in 1963. The company's principal business includes the printing of stationery, computer stationery, security stationery, and business printing including stock certificates, cheques, chequebooks, payment vouchers, invoices and dividend warrants.

Camelot's shares are publicly listed on the Ghana Stock Exchange and are a component of the GSE All-Share Index.
