= Total Petroleum Ghana =

Ghanaian petroleum company

TotalEnergies Ghana
- Company type: Public
- Traded as: GSE: TOTAL
- Industry: Oil and gas industry
- Founded: December 31, 1951
- Headquarters: TotalEnergies Marketing Ghana PLC, Mobil House, 25 Liberia Road, Accra, Greater Accra, Ghana
- Key people: Stanislas Mittleman; Chairman; Guillaume Larroque; CEO
- Products: Oil and gas exploration and production, natural gas and LNG trading and transportation, oil refining, chemicals
- Services: Fuel stations
- Parent: Total S.A.
- Website: totalenergies.com.gh

TotalEnergies Marketing Ghana PLC, formerly known as Mobil Oil Ghana Limited is a Ghanaian petroleum company. They are listed on the stock index of the Ghana Stock Exchange, the GSE All-Share Index. As of October 30, 2006 it operated 225 petrol stations across Ghana with a significant 28% of the market.
