= Societe Generale Ghana =

Société Générale (SG)
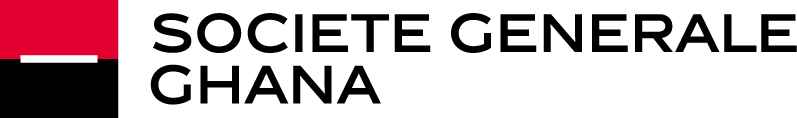

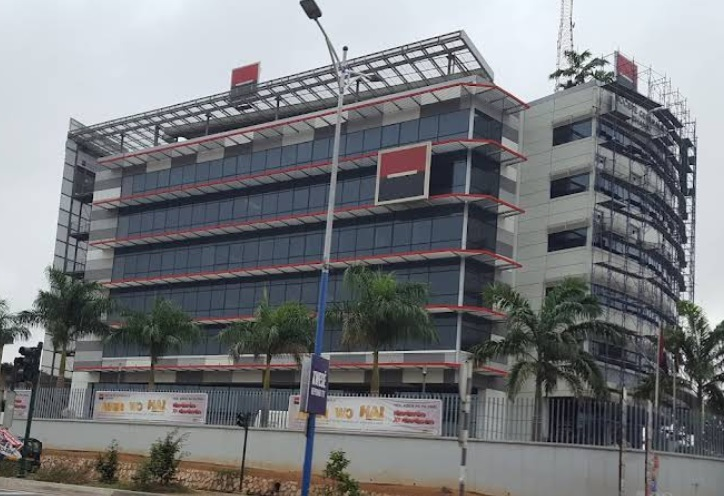
- Type: Public
- Traded as: GSE: SG-SSB
- Industry: Financial services
- Founded: 1975
- Headquarters: Ring Road Central, Accra, Greater Accra, Ghana
- Key people: Kofi Ampim, chairman Sionle Yeo,managing director Arnaud Crouzet, chief operating officer
- Products: Loans, checking, savings, investments, debit cards, credit cards
- Revenue: GHS 1.35B (2024)
- Total assets: US$ 554+ million (GHS 1,088+ million) (2012)
- Website: societegenerale.com.gh

Societe Generale Ghana Limited (SG) is a bank based in Ghana, previously known as Société Générale - Social Security Bank (SG-SSB). It is part of the Société Générale banking group. The bank is based in Accra and its stock is listed on the Ghana Stock Exchange. It is a component of the GSE All-Share Index. According to its website, it is the 7th largest bank in Ghana and has 45 networked branches in Ghana.

== History ==
SG began in 1975 as Security Guarantee Trust Limited and the following year changed its name to Social Security Bank Limited, or SSB. In 1994, SSB merged with the National Savings and Credit Bank, under a World Bank program. The next year, the Ghanaian government divested its 21% share of the bank, and it was converted to a public limited liability company and subsequently listed on the Ghana Stock Exchange. In 2004, the bank rebranded as SG-SSB after Societe Generale acquired a 51% controlling interest in the institution. In 2013 it rebranded as SG to conform with the wider Société Générale group name.

== Overview ==
According to its website, the bank is the 5th largest commercial bank in Ghana by assets, as of December 2011. As of December 2010, the bank's total assets were valued at approximately US$423.4 million (GHS:685.9 million), with shareholders' equity of approximately US$71.9 million (GHS:116.2+ million). The bank markets the "Sika" program including the SIKA Card, a credit card and the Sikatext Initiative Program. The bank is actively investing in internet banking.

== Société Générale Group ==
The bank is one of the subsidiaries of Société Générale. Several of these are located in Africa, in Algeria, Benin, Burkina Faso, Cameroon, Chad, Côte d’Ivoire, Egypt, Ghana, Equatorial Guinea, Madagascar, Mauritania, Morocco, Senegal, South Africa, and Tunisia.

In 2024, the group announced that it would cease operations in Guinea.

== Ownership ==
The bank's stock is listed on the Ghana Stock Exchange and is traded under the symbol SG-SSB. Major shareholders in the bank include the following corporate entities and individuals:

SG-SSB stock ownership
| Rank | Name of owner | Percentage ownership |
|---|---|---|
| 1 | Société Générale Financial Services Holding | 52.24 |
| 2 | SSNIT | 22.14 |
| 3 | Daniel Ofori (an individual) | 07.31 |
| 4 | Others | 08.31 |
| | Total | 100.00 |

== Branches ==
As of December 2011, SG-SSB maintains a network of 38 branches in all regions of Ghana.

=== Greater Accra region ===
- Accra New Town (branch)
- Ashaiman (branch)
- Faanofa (branch)
- Kaneshie Main (branch)
- Spintex Road (branch)
- Osu (branch)
- East Legon (branch)
- Lotteries (agency)
- Pig Farm Spot Bank (agency)
- North Industrial Area (branch)
- Accra Main (branch)
- Okaishie (branch)
- Premier Towers (branch)
- Ring Road Central (branch)
- Tema Main Comm 2 (branch)
- Tema Fishing Harbour (branch)
- Tema Motorway Spot Bank (agency)
- Tudu (branch)
- Madina (branch)
- Dansoman (branch)
- Achimota (branch)

=== Ashanti region ===
- Adum (branch)
- Asafo (branch)
- Kumasi Central (branch)
- Suame (branch)
- Tepa (agency)
- Kejetia (branch)

=== Brong-Aharfo region ===
- Berekum (branch)
- Sunyani (branch)

=== Central region ===
- Cape Coast (branch)
- Dunkwa (branch)
- Kasoa (branch)

=== Eastern region ===
- Akim Oda (branch)
- Koforidua (branch)

=== Northern region ===
- Tamale (branch)

=== Upper east region ===
- Bolgatanga (branch)

=== Volta region ===
- Ho (branch)

=== Western region ===
- Adabokrom (agency)
- Bibiani (branch)
- Takoradi (branch)
- Akontombra (agency)
- Tarkwa (branch)

== See also ==
- List of banks in Ghana
- Economy of Ghana
