= Cocoa Processing Company =

Ghanaian cocoa processing company

- Type: Public limited company
- Traded as: GSE: CPC
- Industry: Manufacturing
- Founded: 27 November 1981; 44 years ago
- Headquarters: Cocoa Processing Company, Heavy Industrial Area, Tema, Greater Accra, Ghana
- Key people: Jacob S. Arthur (Chairman); Richard Amarh Tetteh (CEO)
- Products: Cocoa Beans
- Website: www.goldentreeghana.com

The Cocoa Processing Company Limited is a Ghanaian cocoa processing company. They are listed on the stock index of the Ghana Stock Exchange, the GSE All-Share Index. It formed in 1981.

== Products ==
- Chocolate Varieties (Tetteh Quarshie Bar (TQ Bar), Kingsbite, Oranco bar, Akuafo Bar, Portem Pride, Portem Nut, Coffeechoc)
- Choco-Bake
- Choco Delight (chocolate spread)
- Groundnut Coated with Chocolate (Pebbles (Chocolate dragees))
- Royal Natural Cocoa Powder
- Alltime (Instant drinking chocolate)
- Vitaco (Instant drinking chocolate)

The Company’s products have won several local and international quality awards, thereby confirming the organoleptic quality of food products presented to consumers. In the year 2002, nine of the company’s products have been presented at the World Quality Selections, organized by Monde Selection. Eight of them (the seven branded chocolates and Alltime) have received a Gold Quality Award and one of them (Vitaco) – a Silver Quality Award.

== See also ==
- List of bean-to-bar chocolate manufacturers
