= Ayrton Drugs =

Ghanaian pharmaceuticals company

Ayrton Drug Manufacturing Limited
- Traded as: GSE: AYRTN
- Industry: Pharmaceuticals
- Founded: September 24, 1965
- Headquarters: Accra, Greater Accra, Ghana
- Key people: Chairman- Nik Amarteifio, CEO- Daniel Apeagyei Kissi
- Products: Teedar, Samalin Cough syrup, Virol blood tonic, Ayrton Para caplets
- Website: https://ayrtondrug.com (archived)

Ayrton Drug Manufacturing Limited was a Ghanaian pharmaceutical company. It was established on September 24, 1965. The business entity was listed on the stock index of the Ghana Stock Exchange, the GSE All-Share Index. The factory it ran is based in Tesano, a suburb of Accra. The company's product portfolio included anti-hypertensives, hematinics, dermatological preparations, antibiotics, dewormers, pain killers and anti-inflammatory drugs. In February 2010 Adcock Ingram, a South African pharmaceutical company acquired 66% shares in the company.

In January 2020, Ayrton Drug Manufacturing Limited and two other domestic pharmaceutical companies, Dannex Limited and Starwin Products Limited, had already merged and listed on the GSE as DAS Pharma.
