= Sam-Woode Limited =

Sam Woode Limited
- Company type: Public
- Traded as: GSE: SWL
- Industry: Publishing
- Founded: 16 October 1984
- Founder: Kwesi Sam-Woode
- Headquarters: Sam Woode Ltd, House No. 1, Adole Abla Link, Dansoman, Greater Accra, Ghana
- Key people: Kwesi Sam-Woode (Chairman); Richard K. Oguaa (CEO)
- Services: Publishing, Printing, Stationery

Sam Woode Limited is a Ghanaian publishing company. The company is listed on the stock index of the Ghana Stock Exchange, the GSE All-Share Index. Sam Woode Limited was founded on 16 October 1984 and was listed on the Ghana Stock Exchange in 2002, having converted into a public company in 1998.

== Operations ==
Sam Woode Limited publishes educational textbooks, story books, as well as non-book materials for different levels. Sam Woode Limited's products portfolio includes pre-school and primary school levels, among others.

The company produces books in categories including agency books, agricultural science, basic design and technology, citizenship education, handwriting, information and communication technology, integrated science, social studies, mathematics and religious and moral education, among others. Products from the Sam Woode catalogue are also available for purchase online.

Sam Woode Limited holds exclusive distribution rights for the territory of West Africa for titles by foreign publishers listed on the company's Agency Lists.
