= Golden Web (company) =

Ghanaian food company

- Type: Public
- Traded as: GSE: GWEB
- Industry: Food
- Founded: May 5, 1982
- Headquarters: Golden Web Ltd, Gihoc Shoe Factory, Agogo, Kumasi, Ashanti, Ghana,
- Key people: Amy A. Bello (Chairman); Peter Nkansah (CEO)
- Services: Oils, Vegetable fats and oils, Cooking oils, Palm kernels, Soya beans, Cakes
- Website: goldenwebgh.com

Golden Web is a Ghanaian food company. They are listed on the stock index of the Ghana Stock Exchange, the GSE All-Share Index. It formed on May 5, 1982.

== Operations ==
Golden Web Ltd. processes vegetable oil. The Company produces and markets palm kernels, soya beans, oils and cakes.
