= Starwin Products =

- Company type: Public limited company
- Traded as: GSE: SPL
- Industry: Pharmaceutical
- Founded: 1960
- Headquarters: Starwin Products, Adjuma Crescent Ring Road, South Industrial Area, Accra, Greater Accra, Ghana
- Key people: Nik Amarteifio (Chairman); Yaw Opare-Asamoah (CEO)
- Products: Rapinol, Asmadrin, Painoff, Paraking, milk of magnesia, liver salts

Starwin Products Ghana was a Ghanaian pharmaceutical manufacturer. It was the first pharmaceutical company to be listed on the Ghana Stock Exchange. It was a component of the GSE All-Share Index. The company produced 8 brand name products.

== History ==
Starwin began as the Ghana branch of Sterling Products International in 1960. In 1976, under the Ghanaian government's indigenization program, the company sold 50% of its stock to entrepreneurs in Ghana. In 1987, Sterling, the original company, was bought by Kodak and Starwin Products was born. On January 13, 2004 Starwin became a public limited liability company and in December 2004 the company was listed on the Ghana Stock Exchange.

In January 2020, Starwin Products Limited and two other domestic pharmaceutical companies, Dannex Limited and Ayrton Drug Manufacturing Limited, had already merged and listed on the Ghana Stock Exchange as DAS Pharma.

== Operations ==
The company's product line included Rapinol, Asmadrin, Painoff, Paraking, milk of magnesia and liver salts.
