= Volta Aluminum Company =

Aluminium company

Coordinates: 5°40′04″N 0°01′16″E

Volta Aluminum Company Limited (VALCO)
- Type: Public; Government-owned corporation
- Industry: Metal: Aluminium smelting
- Founded: 1967
- Headquarters: Tema, Greater Accra, Ghana
- Key people: CEO - Robert Makila Sambian
- Products: Alumina to produce aluminium ingots and sows
- Owner: Government of Ghana (100%)
- Website: https://www.valcotema.com

Volta Aluminum Company, doing business as VALCO, is an aluminium company based in Tema, Greater Accra Region founded by Kaiser Aluminum and now wholly owned by the government of Ghana.

== History ==
VALCO was a joint venture with Kaiser Aluminum and ALCOA, major aluminum conglomerates both based in the United States, in the British Gold Coast colony in 1948.

In 1961, Kaiser Aluminum & the Ghana Government invested in the Akosombo Hydroelectric Project to provide energy for its aluminum smelters. The company had negotiated favorable terms for power purchase with the government. The agreement was re-negotiated in 1985, by the Rawlings government, to reflect the increased value of electrical energy. Documentaries reported favourable conditions for employees, with a hospital on site, maternity leave, long service rewarded by imported white goods (fridges, washing machines, etc.), and housing. Industrial relations had cooled by 1993, when the first union backed strike took place. This resulted in a 60% pay increase.

Since this time the Tema plant has seen several years of shutdown and reduced capacity. In May 2003 VALCO closed completely due to persistent problems in negotiating its high consumption of electricity at an affordable rate. On August 4, 2004, Alcoa and the Government of the Republic of Ghana announced that they had finalized agreements to restart the VALCO smelter in Tema. The plan, which included the restart of 3 potlines, representing 120,000 metric tons per year (mtpy), was to be implemented in the first quarter of 2006.]. It reopened in early 2006, However the plant shut again between 2007 and 2011.

In June 2008, ALCOA sold its 10% stake in VALCO to the government of Ghana, leaving it wholly in government ownership and with no source of foreign investment capital.

== Operations ==
VALCO smelts alumina to produce aluminium ingots at its smelter at Tema. Locally, a major Ghanaian customer of VALCO is Aluworks. While one motivation for establishing the plant was the local availability of bauxite in Ghana, the major raw material of alumina, VALCO has for many decades imported alumina to produce aluminum.

The smelter has a capacity to produce 200,000 metric tons per year of ingots. In early 2011, it began operating again at about 20% of its capacity, producing 3,000 tons per month, mostly for local consumption, with plans to activate a second potline to bring monthly production up to 6,000 tons in Tema. 11 years later in 2022, the 600-acre plant was still operating at about one-fifth of its rated capacity, producing liquid aluminium, rolling ingot, and extrusion billet. These are used for electrical cables and conductors, holloware (including pots and pans) and roofing sheets.

The government is seeking to internalise bauxite mining and aluminium smelting and production in Ghana, with new mines and plant updates. Industry media suggests in 2023 that despite retaining 750 workers the plant is aging, requiring at least US$600m of investment, to bring production up to 300,000 tpa. Ghana imports up to 45,000 tonnes of aluminium products and also sees potential in joining the 'green metals' sector given the plant is still mostly powered by hydroelectricity.

== See also ==
- Aluminium in Africa
