= Standard Chartered Ghana =

Bank in Ghana

Standard Chartered Bank Ghana Limited
- Company type: Public company
- Traded as: GSE: SCB
- Industry: Financial
- Founded: 1896
- Headquarters: Accra, Greater Accra, Ghana
- Key people: Ishmael Yamson, Chairman; Mansa Nettey, CEO
- Products: Financial services, Trade, Investments
- Parent: Standard Chartered
- Website: www.sc.com/gh

Standard Chartered Ghana (officially Standard Chartered Bank Ghana PLC (SCB.GH)) is a banking and financial services company in Ghana, and an 80% subsidiary of Standard Chartered. They are listed on the stock index of the Ghana Stock Exchange, the GSE All-Share Index. Operating since 1896, it is one of the oldest companies in Ghana. It is the successor to the Bank of British West Africa in Ghana.

== Services ==
Standard Chartered Bank PLC is a financial services institution in Ghana offering a wide range of banking products to the retail, commercial and corporate sectors. They company also offers full-service products, from transactional accounts and electronic banking services to foreign exchange and currency accounts, trade and working capital solutions, international trade accounts and personal overdraft and unsecured loans as well as bancassurance and asset protection services.

== Management ==
The CEO of Standard Chartered Bank Ghana PLC is Mansa Nettey. The banky appointed Ebenezer Twum Asante as Chairman of the Board of Directors in March 2023.

Standard Chartered Bank Ghana PLC Management
No.	Name of Board Chair	Year Appointed
1	Ebenezer Twum Asante	March 2023
2	Dr. Emmanuel Oteng Kumah	July 2018
