= African Champion Industries =

- Company type: Public
- Traded as: GSE: ACI
- Genre: Manufacturing
- Founded: May 23, 1967; 52 years ago
- Headquarters: 113, 3rd Industrial Link, Tema, Greater Accra, Ghana
- Key people: Francis Andoh (CEO); Elkin Pianim (Chairman)
- Products: Toilet rolls, printing, typing and writing papers
- Website: africanchampionindustries.com

African Champion Industries, previously called Super Paper Products Co. Ltd., is a Ghana and manufacturing company involved in the production of toilet paper. They are listed on the stock index of the Ghana Stock Exchange, the GSE All-Share Index. The company was established on May 23, 1967.
