= Produce Buying Company =

- Type: Public
- Traded as: GSE: PBC
- Industry: Buying of cocoa beans
- Genre: Manufacturing
- Founded: November 13, 1981
- Headquarters: Dzorwulu Junction, Achimota Road, Achimota, Greater Accra, Ghana
- Key people: Maxwell Kojo Atta-Krah; Managing Director; Joseph Osei Manu; Dep. Managing Director (F&A)
- Products: Cocoa beans, sheanuts
- Website: www.pbcgh.com

Produce Buying Company is a Ghanaian cocoa bean company. They are listed on the stock index of the Ghana Stock Exchange, the GSE All-Share Index. It formed on November 13, 1981.

== Operations ==
Produce Buying Company is one of the biggest dealers in cocoa, sheanut and other cash crop in the West Africa sub-region.

The Produce Buying Company purchases cocoa beans and shea nuts from agricultural producers for storage in local, specialized sheds. The company is responsible for transporting these stocks to designated takeover centers and collection points, where they undergo inspection, grading, and sealing by the Quality Control Department of the Ghana Cocoa Board.[1]
