= Clydestone Ghana =

Ghanaian information and communications technology company

Clydestone Ghana PLC
- Type: Public limited company
- Traded as: GSE: CLYD
- Industry: Information technology
- Founded: June 1989
- Founder: Paul Tse Jacquaye
- Headquarters: No. 14 Adebeto Close, North Labone, Accra, Ghana
- Key people: Paul Jacquaye (Acting Chairman) Felistas Kisivo (Executive Director)  Nii Obodai Torto (Non-Executive Director) Dr Kwabena Adusei-Poku (Independent Non-Executive Director)
- Products: Payment systems, transaction switching, financial technology and information technology services
- Website: https://www.clydestone.com/

Clydestone Ghana PLC is a Ghanaian information and communications

 technology company headquartered in Accra. The company is listed on the Ghana
 Stock Exchange under the ticker symbol CLYD.[1][2]
The company provides payment systems, transaction switching, settlement and
 clearing solutions, instant card-issuance solutions, authentication services,
 financial-document processing, and other information-technology services.[1] Clydestone's products and services include G-switch,
 an electronic payment platform, as well as cheque-truncation and transaction-
 processing systems.[3]

== Subsidiaries and operations ==
 Clydestone Ghana PLC owns a 100% beneficial interest in Clydestone Nigeria
 Limited, a company incorporated in Nigeria. The group also owns an 85%
 interest in Remittance Processing Limited, incorporated in Ghana.[1]

 Clydestone states that it operates across Ghana, Nigeria and Kenya, providing
 financial-document processing, remittance-processing and transaction-switching
 technology to financial institutions and other organisations.[3]
