= Printex =

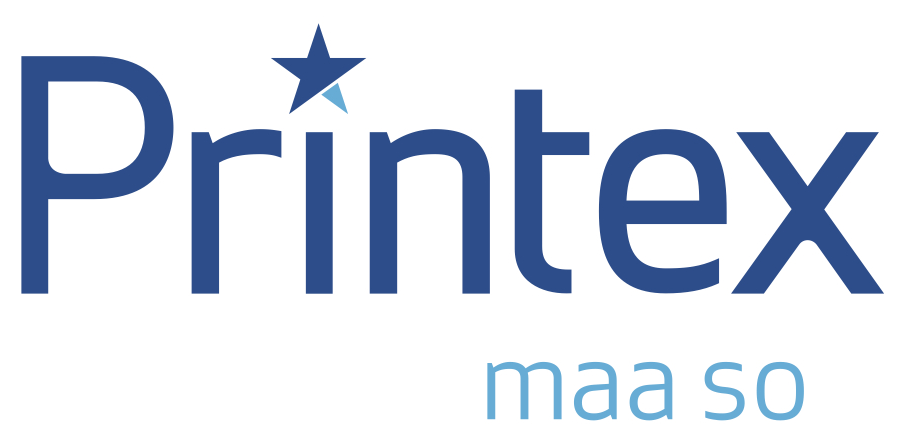
- Company type: Public
- Genre: Textile industry Textile manufacturing
- Founded: 1958
- Headquarters: Spintex Road, Accra, Greater Accra, Ghana
- Area served: Worldwide
- Products: Textile products; including uniforms, shirting materials, dress fabrics, and furnishings
- Number of employees: 500+
- Website: printexghana.com

Printex Limited is a privately owned textile manufacturing company headquartered in Accra, the capital of Ghana, with over 500 employees. The company was established in 1958 as Millet Textile Corporation (MTC), producing mainly terry towels. Printex prints are a combination of art, cultural inspirations, and interpretations of Africa’s landscape, and wildlife.

In 1980 the company began operating as Spintex Limited, on a 25+ acre plot on the Spintex Road in a massive expansion program. Spinning, kente clothing weaving and finishing departments were added to increase production capacity for new textile products including uniforms, shirting materials, dress fabrics, and furnishings.

By 1997 when it assumed its current name, the company had entered into the African textiles market producing woven or printed cotton or polyester viscose blends. Printex ventured into the African print market with a trademark black-and-white print of intricate designs.

Today the company produces all-color screen prints and African print fabric inspired by a team of textile creatives. Printex prints different range of authentic Ghanaian and African patterns which are sold locally in Ghana and exported to other parts of the continents and the world as a whole.

== Products ==
African Print, African Fashion, Seer Sucker, Oheneba, Piesie, Diamond (Plain & Colored), Gold Print, Opanyin, Amaamre, Soso, Egudie, Exotic, Fancy, Osikani, Adinkra, Lace, Ruby, Ntamapa-Royale, Arete, Xclusive

== Fun Facts ==
Printex is headquartered in Accra the capital of Ghana with an office on Spintex Road.

In 2012, Menaye Donkor, model and wife of International footballer Sulley Muntari was the "Face of Printex"’.

(Ashanti Twi: Maaso Me she bi) is one of the most recognized brand tag lines in Ghana.
