= Suretrack Contracts Services =

Private Construction Firm

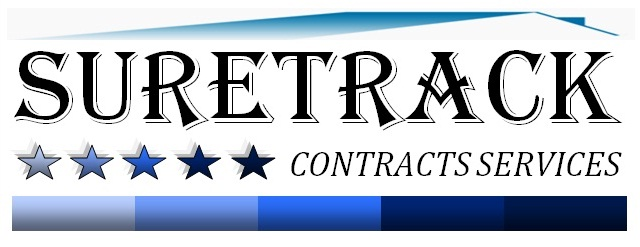
- Type: Private
- Industry: Construction, Civil engineering
- Founded: 2007
- Headquarters: Accra, Ghana
- Website: www.suretrackservices.com

Suretrack Contracts Services is a privately owned construction firm which provides professional services which include Engineering, Design, Planning, Project Management, Construction Management, Real Estate and Consulting services for all aspects of buildings, infrastructure and the environment in Ghana.

== History ==
The Company was founded in 2007: it was originally based in the Eastern Region Nkawkaw. Originally working mainly on projects in Accra, the firm now operates nationwide and in almost all areas of engineering and construction for the built environment.

== Operations ==
The Company has offices in four regions, Greater Accra Region, Eastern Region, Ashanti Region and Northern Region, with its head office in the Greater Accra Region.

== Major projects ==
Public Projects: Suretrack was involved in the construction of training ground facilities in the Northern Region for the 26th edition of the Africa Cup of Nations held in Ghana. Suretrack completed a two number four- apartments teachers’ accommodation for Abirem District Assembly (JICA sponsored project). A major subcontractor on a contract for the construction of classroom blocks in the New Juaben Municipal Assembly. Suretrack is currently in contract with JICS for the construction of three number classroom blocks in Assin Manso in the Central Region.

Private Projects: A majority of Suretrack projects are construction of high end private residential developments, hotels and office developments for overseas clients. Current ongoing projects for detached residential properties in Greater Accra and Ashanti Region. It is also developing a hotel and leisure resort in the central region.
