= Enterprise Group (Ghana) =

Ghanaian insurance company

Enterprise Group is a Ghanaian insurance company. It is now called Enterprise Group Plc and it was incorporated on 24 November 2008. It is the parent company of all it subsidiaries .

They are listed on the stock index of the Ghana Stock Exchange, the GSE All-Share Index. It has been in operation since 1924, when Ghana was the British Gold Coast, under the name Enterprise Insurance Company.

The group has Friendliness, Professionalism, Trust, Excellence and Reliability as its core value.

== History ==
The company was originally called Enterprise Insurance Company and it was established in 1924. It is the oldest insurance company in Ghana. It was listed on the Ghana Stock Exchange (GSE) in 1991 and it currently listed as Enterprise Group Plc.

== Directors ==
Keli Gadzekpo is the board chairman of Enterprise Group Plc, Daniel Larbi- Tieku is the group chief executive officer and Michael Tyson is the group chief finance officer. Some of the directors of the group are Trevor Trefgarne, Prof. Angela Ofori-Atta, Martin Esson-Benjamin and Fiifi Kwakye.

== Operations ==
The core business used to be solely insurance but over the years it has expanded into investment financing, management consultancy, real estate, health, pensions and funeral home. It has Life Assurance branches in Nigeria and The Gambia.
