= Pioneer Kitchenware =

Ghanaian retailer

- Company type: Public limited company
- Traded as: GSE: PKL
- Industry: Manufacturing
- Founded: July 11, 1957
- Founder: Paul Gottfried Schwegler
- Headquarters: Pioneer Kitchenware, Heavy Industrial Area, Tema, Greater Accra, Ghana
- Key people: Togbe Afede XIV (Chairman); Alhaji A. R. Isaka (CEO)
- Products: Kitchenware

Pioneer Kitchenware, formerly known as the Ghana Pioneer Aluminium Factory, is a kitchenware retailer in Ghana. It was listed on the stock index of the Ghana Stock Exchange, the GSE All-Share Index, until 14 January 2019.
