= SIC Insurance Company =

Ghanaian insurance company

- Type: Public
- Traded as: GSE: SIC
- Industry: Insurance
- Genre: Insurers and reinsurers
- Founded: February 1962; 64 years ago
- Headquarters: SIC Head Office Building (Nyemitei House); 28/29 Ring Road East; Osu, Greater Accra; Ghana
- Key people: Hon. Bernard Ahiafor (1st Deputy Speaker of Parliament & MP for Akatsi South) Board Chairman); James Agyenim-Boateng Managing Director
- Services: Insurance
- Website: www.sic-gh.com

SIC Insurance PLC (formerly known as State Insurance Corporation) is a Ghanaian insurance company. They are listed on the Stock Index of the Ghana Stock Exchange, the GSE All-Share Index. It was formed in February 1962.

== Operations ==
=== Products ===
SIC Insurance writes virtually all classes of short-term insurance including five which covers motor, fire, marine, aviation, general accident, and policies for the hospitality industry.

=== Oil and gas ===
In light of the oil found along the western coast of Ghana, SIC Insurance positioned itself to underwrite oil and gas and other ancillary businesses in Ghana. Further to this, Ghana Insurers Association (GIA) as a way of building capacity and positioning itself to adequately handle all related insurance on oil and energy risks, and form a pool. All insurances relating to exploration, drilling, to the production of oil and gas are placed in the pool and the core responsibility of the entire portfolio is managed by the appointed Manager. SIC Insurance was appointed as the pool manager based on their capital base, human resource capacity, and track record among other things. SIC Insurance's responsibility involves dealing with all the Ghana insurance companies participating in the pool, the clients and other stakeholders as well as the overseas re-insurers.

=== Market share ===
SIC Insurance is one of the leading providers of non-life insurance products in Ghana with an estimated market share of over 12%. The company exceeds the minimum stated capital requirement of US$1 million (GH¢1.42 million) set by the National Insurance Commission of Ghana.
