= Ghana Oil Company =

State-Owned Oil company based in Ghana

GOIL Ghana Limited
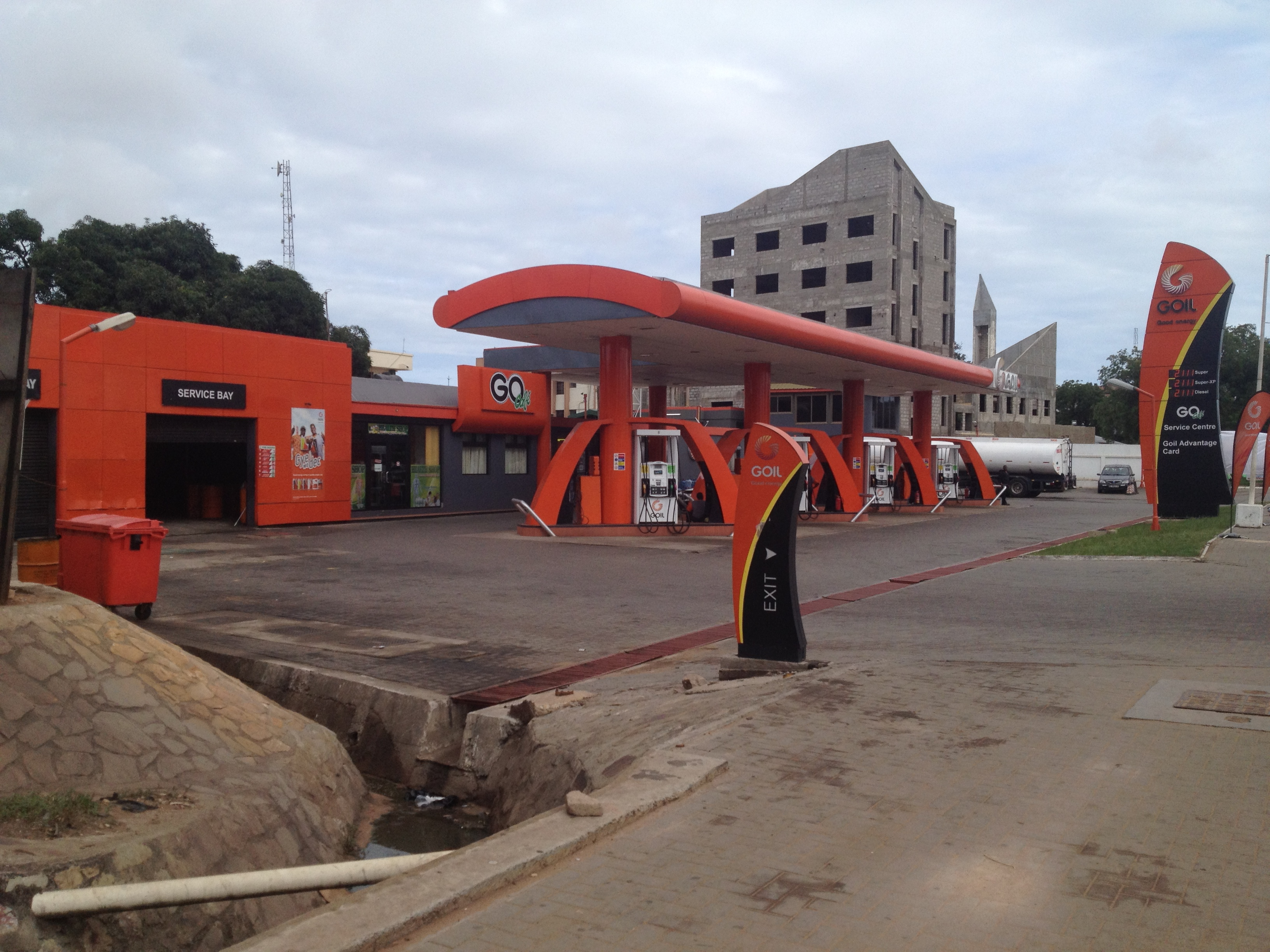
- Ghana Oil Company in Accra
- Type: Public
- Traded as: GSE: GOIL
- Industry: Petroleum
- Founded: 14 June 1960
- Headquarters: House. No. D659/4, Kojo Thompson Road, Accra, Greater Accra, Ghana
- Key people: K. Osei-Prempeh (group CEO); Mr Reginald Daniel Laryea (chairman)
- Products: Petroleum natural gas petroleum products
- Owner: Government of Ghana
- Website: www.goil.com.gh

GOIL PLC, formerly known as GOIL Company Limited (GOIL) and Ghana Oil Company and also known as GOIL, is a state-owned Ghanaian oil and gas marketing company, formed on 14 June 1960. Currently it holds the place of Ghana's top oil marketing company, and is the only indigenous owned petroleum marketing company in Ghana.

== History ==
=== Founding ===
Founded in 1960, GOIL began as a private enterprise named AGIP Ghana Company Limited, with major shareholders being AGIP SPA of Italy and SNAM S.P.A. It took over from the marketing outfit of AGIP PETROLI, a subsidiary that was established in Ghana in 1960. It was initially founded as a company producing fossil fuel products such as fuel, propane and butane, asphalt, and lubricants. In 1968 SNAM S.P.A. transferred its shares to Hydrocarbons International Holdings. In 1974, the Government of Ghana acquired 100 percent shares and the name was changed from AGIP Ghana Company Limited to Ghana Oil Company Limited.

Again, in 2019, the company changed its name to GOIL Company Limited and later to GOIL PLC, to represent its growth and expansion works in the petroleum sector and other industries.

=== Ownership ===
In 1974 Ghana bought AGIP SPA's and Hydrocarbons International Holdings’ shares. In 2007 GOIL's board approved becoming a public company, making the company a state-owned enterprise (SOE). The shareholding structure of GOIL PLC is as follows: Government of Ghana currently owns 34.23%, Social Security and National Insurance Trust (SSNIT) owns 25%, Bulk Oil Storage And Transportation Co Ltd (BOST) owns 20.03% and other private investors own 20.74% of its shares. These shares are held through Social Security and National Insurance Trust (SSNIT), an agency charged with Ghana's pension system. The SSNIT holds these shares because it has an interest in major aspects of Ghana's economy because it needs sectors to do well to insure pensions.

=== 2010–2012 rebranding ===
Due to deregulation efforts in 2005 among downstream petroleum companies, GOIL began to lose its market dominance. The method the company employed to address the revenue losses from increased competition was to embark on a rebranding strategy that included a new logo and a new slogan of "energy with a smile." The new logo expresses the positive flow of energy to represent movement, energy, life, warmth, harmony, organic and growth. They also completed ISO certification, giving both customers and shareholders more confidence in GOIL's products. More service stations were added as part of the initiative. Efforts are still being made to further improve customer satisfaction, increased shareholder value. The rebranding has overall been considered successful, and has kept GOIL as the country's top petroleum marketer.

=== 2015 Explosion ===
On 4 June 2015, a GOIL fuel station in Accra exploded. The station had been used as a shelter for victims of the 2015 Accra floods, and the disaster was compounded by floodwaters as gas floated and spread. The death toll was at least 150 people.^{[5]} In 2018, 69 victims filed a class action lawsuit for GH₵40 million in damages, and GH₵1 million for hospital bills and transportation against the specific GOIL station, the National Petroleum Authority, and Accra's mayor, Alfred Oko Vanderpuije.

=== ExxonMobil Partnership ===
In October 2018, Ghana began asking for bids from domestic and international oil companies to explore offshore oil reserves. In December 2018 it was announced that GOIL, in partnership with ExxonMobil and Ghana National Petroleum Corporation (GNPC) would be entering into deep-water oil exploration in the Cape Three Points area. This move is supposed to strengthen Ghana's indigenous presence in the petroleum industry, and increase domestic oil production. For GOIL, engaging in deep-water oil exploration would mean shifting towards being an upstream petroleum company.

== Leadership ==
Mr Reginald Daniel Laryea, who is also a past president of the Advertising Association of Ghana has been the board chairman of GOIL PLC since September 2021.

Kwame Osei-Prempeh served as Goil's chief executive officer, managing director, and executive director from December 2019 to November 2024. Before his appointment, he had been a board member of GOIL since 2017. He has also gained rich experience from private practice as a senior legal practitioner and as a public servant.

Jacob Kwabena Adjei currently serves as Group CEO & Managing Director of GOIL.

In February 2025, Nana Philip Archer was appointed the position of Board Chairman and Edward Abambire Bawa was made Group CEO & Managing Director.

== Awards and recognition ==
Goil has won numerous awards, including first place in the Ghana Energy Awards for petroleum company of the year in 2001, 2005, 2007, and 2008. It also consistently places first in Chartered Institute of Marketing Ghana (CIMG) awards for petroleum company of the year.

In 2018, Chairman Peter Bartels was awarded "Outstanding Board Chairman of the year 2018" in Accra's 9th Entrepreneur and Corporate Executive Awards.

In 2019 the company picked up the Chartered Institute of Marketing Ghana (CIMG) Hall of Fame Award in the Elite Category under 10 years.

== Operations ==
The company's main business is the marketing and distribution of petroleum products in Ghana. The biggest chunk of its sales comes from the sale of diesel and gasoline. The company is staffed by a fifteen member management team headed by the managing director.

Throughout Ghana, GOIL has five regional offices that serve as distribution points in Accra, Tema, Kumasi, Takoradi, and Tamale. However, the main distribution points for fuels are Liaison Office, Central Depot, and the Accra Plains Depot all within the Tema catchment area, and the Takoradi Depot.

GOIL has the largest retail network across Ghana. The company also has numerous consumer outlets throughout Ghana. The consumer outlets include companies, schools, hospitals, factories, hotels, banks and major parastatals. In addition, GOIL has a number of other retail outlets established to market premix fuel and kerosene to rural areas in Ghana. LP Gas filling plants have also been installed at some of the filling and service stations and at other locations in Ghana.

Currently, GOIL's technical partners are ENI SPA (AGIP) of Italy.

In 2023, GOIL Company Limited became GOIL Public Limited Company (PLC).

In September 2024, GOIL and Société Multinationale de Bitumens (SMB) of Cote d'Ivoire began a joint venture for the commissioning of the $40 million Bitumen Terminal in Tema.

== Corporate Social Responsibility ==
In February 2026, Ghana Oil Company (GOIL PLC) reaffirmed its support as a key sponsor of the 10th edition of the Heritage Caravan, an annual cultural tour organized by Channel One TV and Citi FM that promotes Ghanaian heritage. GOIL’s involvement, described by a company representative as part of its commitment to connecting with local communities and celebrating national culture, marked continued sponsorship of the event. The 2026 Heritage Caravan, scheduled to begin on 1 March, was expected to feature curated travel experiences, live performances, and culinary showcases across several regions of Ghana.

== See also ==
- List of oil exploration and production companies
- Oil reserves in Ghana
- Economy of Ghana
