= Guinness Ghana Breweries =

Ghanaian brewery

Guinness Ghana
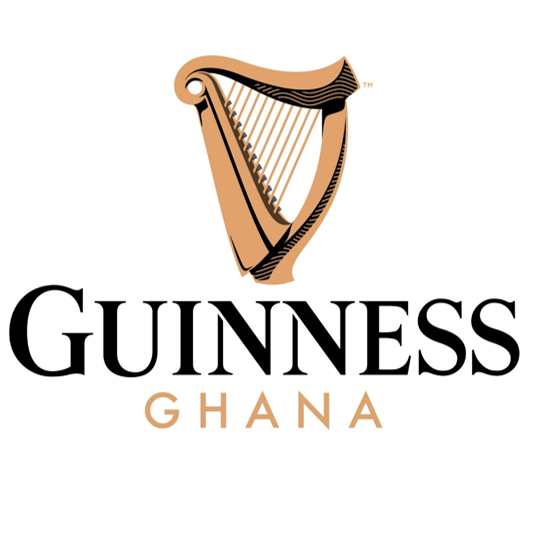
- Type: Public
- Traded as: GSE: GGBL
- Industry: Brewing
- Founded: 29 August 1960; 65 years ago
- Headquarters: Kumasi & Accra, Ghana
- Products: Beer brewing, Non-alcoholic Malt drinks and RTD drinks dry stout; liquor
- Parent: Castel Group

Guinness Ghana Breweries is a Ghanaian brewery founded in 1960, located in the Kaase Industrial Area in Kumasi and listed on the stock index of the Ghana Stock Exchange, the GSE All-Share Index. At its inception, it produced only Guinness Foreign Extra Stout, popularly known as Guinness.

In Accra, the brewery is represented at the former premises of Achimota Brewery Company, in Achimota, at the Tata Brewery Ltd, which was established by J. K. Siaw, a Ghanaian industrialist.

In July 2025, Diageo sold 80.4% of the company's stake to the French brewery Castel Group.

== Brands ==
The company makes the following products:

- Malta Guinness
- Star Beer
- Orijin
- Smirnoff
- Alvaro
- Gulder
- Guinness
- Odehye3

== Sponsorship ==
On 5 August 2022, the Ghana Football Association announced a title sponsorship with Guinness Ghana for the Ghana Women’s Premier League worth GH¢10 million (renaming the league as the Malta Guinness Women's Premier League) for three years from the 2022–23 season onwards.
