= Third-party billing =

Type of billing which involves an intermediary

Third-party billing is a form of billing where an intermediary handles the invoicing and payment between a purchaser and a vendor.

== Telecommunications ==
In telecommunications, it can refer to an operator-assisted telephone call, usually in conjunction with the assistance of a live or automated telephone operator.

It can also refer to a service that allows consumers to make purchases through authorized merchants, service providers and telecommunications companies, and have charges placed directly on their local phone bill, as an alternate payment option.

Third party billing serves nearly 12 million households in the United States, and handles hundreds of millions of authorized transactions for consumers and businesses each year. Several businesses, including Fortune 500 companies, choose to have their services included on their phone bills to reduce administrative needs and costs.

== Transportation ==
In transportation, third party billing is the transference of transportation charges to a party other than the shipper or consignee.

== Cramming ==
Cramming happens when third party billing occurs on phones without consent of the person being billed.
