= Aluworks =

Aluminium-based products company in Ghana

- Company type: Public
- Traded as: GSE: ALW
- Industry: Aluminium
- Founded: February 24, 1978
- Headquarters: Tema, Greater Accra; No. 63/1, Heavy Industrial Area, P. O. Box 914, Tema, Greater Accra, Ghana
- Key people: Seth Adjei, Chairman; E. Kwasi Okoh, CEO
- Products: sheets, coils, louver blades, corrugated roofing

Aluworks is a manufacturing company based in Tema, Greater Accra. It was founded on February 24, 1978, and was converted to a public limited liability company on May 28, 1996. After an Initial Public Offer in October 1996, it was listed on the Ghana Stock Exchange on November 29, 1996, at the share price of GH¢ 0.135. The company is a component listing of the GSE All-Share Index. It is the only company in Ghana that casts and processes aluminium ingots.

== Operations ==
Aluworks makes aluminium sheets, coils, corrugated roofing, and louver blades from raw aluminium ingots.

In 2021, the Chairman of the company was Lade Wosomu.

== Controversy ==
In 2020, the management of the company accused Sunda International and Yai Tin International of importing subsidized aluminium coils and circles into Ghana. The company also accused them of reduction of prices and abuse of the 5% duty rates. The company petitioned the Ghana government, citing dumping, trade in cheap goods, and price undercutting.

== Suspension ==
In 2017, the company was put on a watch list by the Ghana Stock Exchange.

In 2018, the company again was threatened by the Ghana Stock Exchange to be delisted due to lack of compliance.

In 2023, the Ghana Stock Exchange suspended the listing status of the company due to the company's failure to submit its audited accounts for 2022 and its financial statements for 2023.
