= CalBank =

Commercial bank in Ghana

Coordinates: 05°33′51″N 00°11′44″W

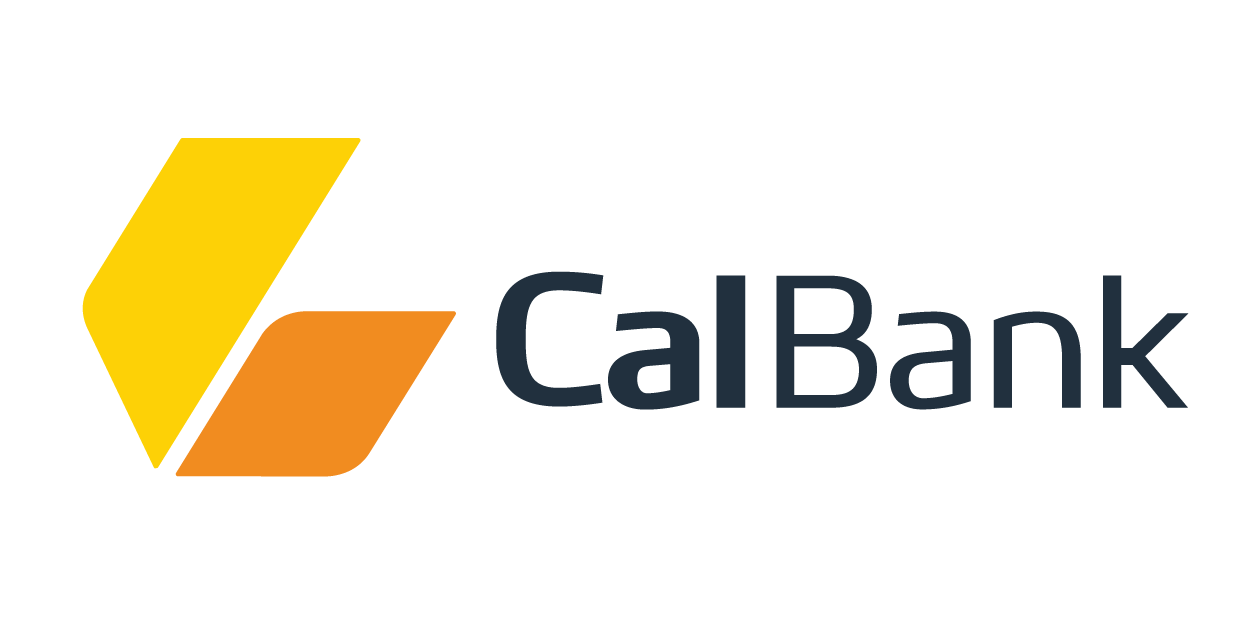

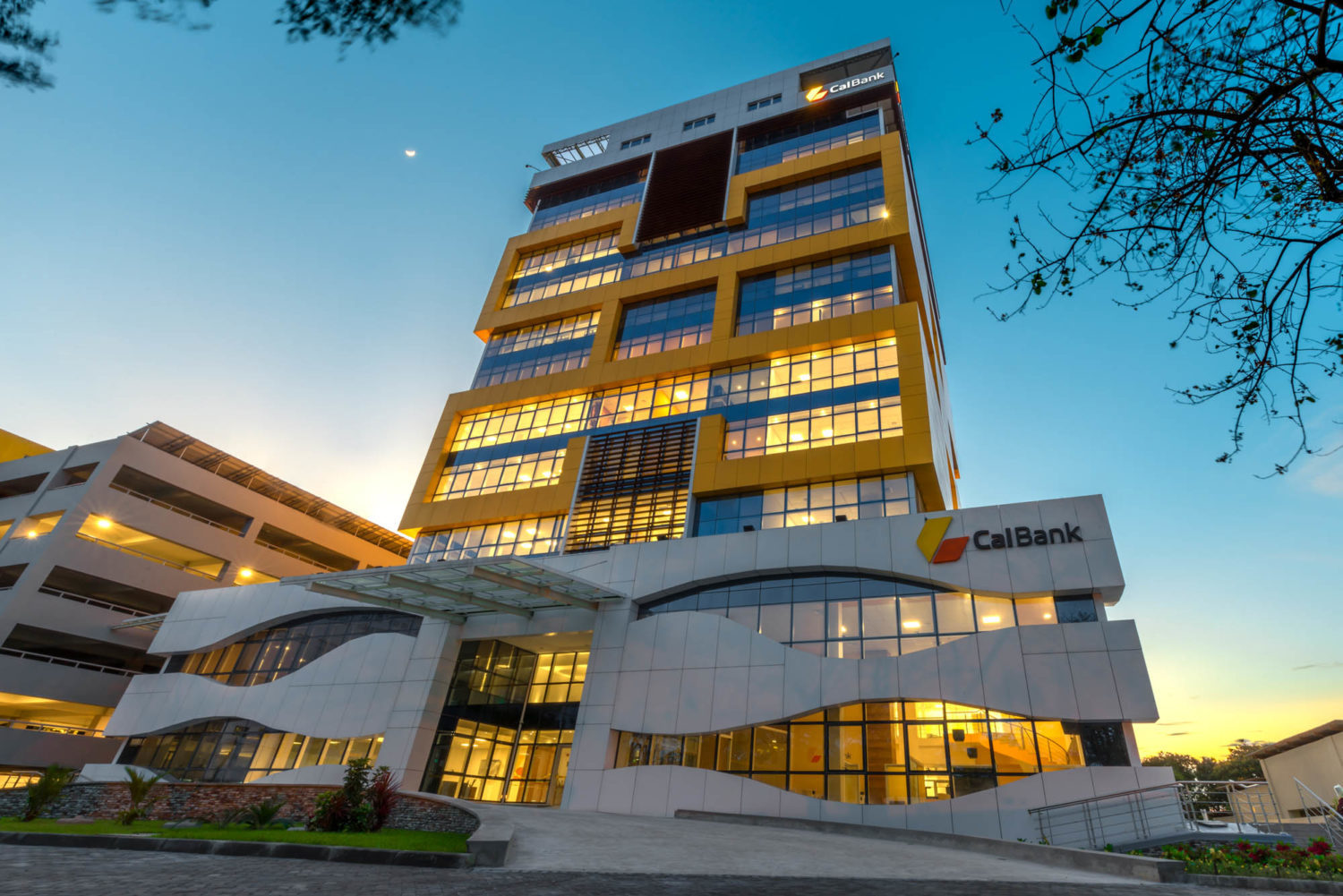
- CalBank's Head Office Tower, located on the 23 Independence Avenue in Accra
- Type: Public
- Traded as: GSE: CAL
- Industry: Financial services
- Founded: July 1990; 36 years ago
- Headquarters: 23 Independence Avenue, North Ridge, Accra, Ghana
- Key people: Daniel Nii Kwei-Kumah Sackey, chairman Carl Selasi Asem, managing director
- Products: Loans, checking, savings, investments, debit cards, mortgages
- Revenue: ▲ Aftertax:GHS:267,720,000 (2024)
- Total assets: GHS:11,688,797,000 (2024)
- Website: www.calbank.net

CalBank is a commercial bank in Ghana that is licensed by the Bank of Ghana, the central bank and national banking regulator.

== Location ==
The headquarters of CalBank and its main branch are located at 23 Independence Avenue, in North Ridge in the central business district of Greater Accra, the capital of Ghana. The geographical coordinates of the bank's headquarters are:05°33'51.0"N, 0°11'44.0"W (Latitude: 5.564167; Longitude: -0.195556).

== Overview ==
Founded in 1990, CalBank is a large financial services retail bank that serves the banking needs of large corporations, high net worth individuals, non-governmental organisations, regular customers and small and medium enterprises. As of December 2024, the bank's assets totaled GHS:11,688,797,000, with shareholders' equity of GHS:272,564,000.

== Ownership ==
The stock of CalBank is traded on the Ghana Stock Exchange under the symbol CAL. As of December 2024, the stock ownership of the bank is reflected in the table below:

CalBank stock ownership
Rank	Name of owner	Percentage ownership
1	Social Security and National Insurance Trust	55.65
2	Arise B.V.	16.03
3	Scgn/Jpmse Lux Re Robeco Afrika Fonds N.V.	2.29
4	Scgn/Citibank Kuwait Inv Authority	1.88
5	Apotica Limited Company	1.84
6	Hfcn/ Glico Pensions Re: Cidan Investments Ltd	1.66
7	Adu Jnr, Frank Brako	1.56
8	Ofori, Daniel	1.42
9	Scgn/Enterprise Tier 2 Occupational Pension Scheme	1.19
10	Hfcn/ Ssnit Staff 2Nd Tier Occupational Pension Sc	1.13
11	Ofori, Daniel	0.84
12	Scgn/Citibank New York Re Allan Gray Africa, Ex - Sa Equity Fund Limited	0.77
13	Ges Occ Pension - Databank Financial Services	0.66
14	Scgn/Scb Difc Ac Fi.Br.Group Ac Double Di.Div.Fd.L	0.63
15	Gentrust Sankofa Master Trust Scheme, Gentrust Sankofa Master Trust Scheme	0.38
16	Ansah, Benjamin Fosu	0.37
17	Enterprise Tier 2 Occupational Pension Scheme	0.37
18	Scgn / Enterprise Life Ass. Co. Policy Holders/ E.L.A.C.P.H.	0.35
19	Hosi, Senyo Kwasi	0.29
20	Addison, Eugene Samuel	0.24
21	Others	10.4
	Total	100.00

== Directors ==
CalBank is governed by a board of directors, of whom two are executive directors and three are non-executives. The chairman of the board is Daniel Nii Kwei-Kumah Sackey, one of the non-executive directors.

Board of directors
Name	Position
Daniel Nii Kwei-Kumah Sackey	Chairman
Carl Selasi Asem	Managing director
Johnson Delali Oware	Deputy managing director
Kwadwo Brantuo Mpeani	Non-executive director
Yvonne Ofosu-Appiah	Non-executive director
Gerrit Muller	Non-executive director

== Executive management ==
Carl Selasi Asem is the managing director of CalBank. He is an associate member of the Ghana Institute of Engineers. Prior to becoming the acting managing director at CalBank, he was the deputy managing director at the bank. He previously served as the managing director at Ecobank Gambia bringing over 17 years in marketing, sales, and business development. Asem holds a Bachelor of Science in Chemical Engineering and has pursued executive education at Columbia Business School and the Harvard Kennedy School.

CalBank PLC has appointed Johnson Oware as its deputy managing director, effective January 20, 2025. Oware, with over 20 years in banking, will oversee the bank's corporate, commercial, and retail operations. He previously served as head of corporate banking at Ecobank Ghana. Oware holds a BSc in Administration, an MBA in Finance, and a Diploma in Public-Private Partnership. CalBank's board chairman expressed confidence in his ability to support the bank's growth and strategic goals.

== See also ==
- List of banks in Ghana
- Economy of Ghana
