= Accra Brewery Limited =

Brewery in Accra, Ghana

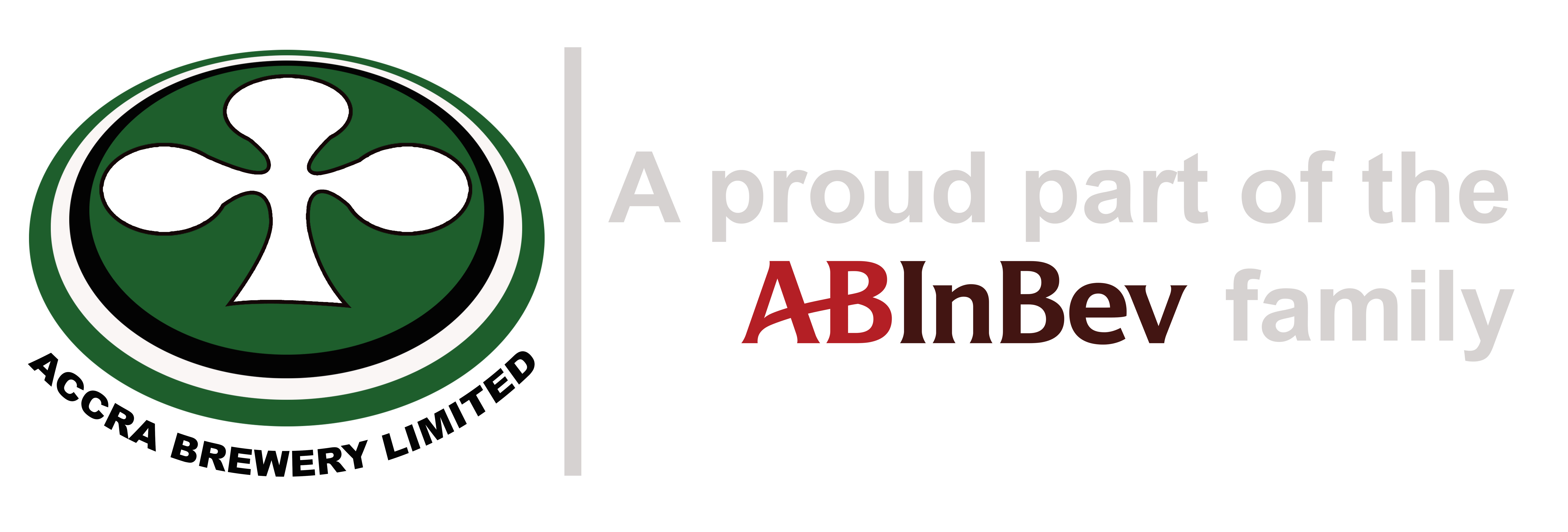
Accra Brewery Limited corporate logo

Accra Brewery Limited is a brewery based in Accra, Ghana.

== Background ==
In 1931, Accra Brewery Limited (ABL), first registered in Switzerland as Overseas Breweries Limited, was built in Adabraka, becoming West Africa's first brewery. The company's establishment marked the beginning of Ghana's non-traditional manufacturing industry, with CLUB Premium Lager, its flagship brand, becoming Ghana's first manufactured product. In 1975, the assets of Overseas Breweries Ltd. were taken over by the locally registered Accra Brewery Ltd. (ABL) to facilitate Ghanaian participation in the business. In October 2016, ABL became a subsidiary of Anheuser-Busch InBev (ABInBev) after the latter acquired controlling shares of ABL's former parent company, SABMiller Plc.

== History ==
Accra Brewery Limited's (ABL) history began in 1931 when Overseas Breweries Ltd., a Swiss-registered company built the brewery in Adabraka, in an area later designated as the South Industrial Area of Accra.

The Nathan Institute of Zurich, Switzerland, was contracted to see to the general supervision of all construction works, installation of plant and machinery, and brewery technology. The building contract was awarded to Turner & Schilling, a local firm who, with the assistance of over 500 workers, completed all the buildings for the official opening.

The Governor of the Gold Coast, Sir Shenton Thomas, inaugurated the Brewery, setting the company up as Ghana's first non-traditional manufacturing company, and the first brewery in West Africa.

=== ABL in the 1930s ===
A number of factors threatened to derail the company's fortunes in the 1930s.

a) Its flagship brand, CLUB Premium Lager, had to compete against a variety of imported beers.

b) That era's recession generally impacted industries around the world, affecting the sale of beer which was considered a luxury.

c)The subsequent outbreak of World War II disrupted the constant flow of raw materials, spares, etc.

=== First Year of Production ===
In the first year of operation, a quantity of 24,411 cases = 8,878hl of beer and 2,076 dozen of soda and mineral water were sold. This was just enough to break even: for 1933/34, the books showed a moderate profit of £60. The following year, sales made was 54,102 cases of beer = 19,500hl and 6,795 dozens soda and mineral waters which meant that we produced nearly at as full as the installed capacity for the whole year which was about 20,00hl. From 1935 onwards, the company's Board was able to repay its capital debts and declare a modest dividend of 7% of the equity capital.

=== Expansion Period ===
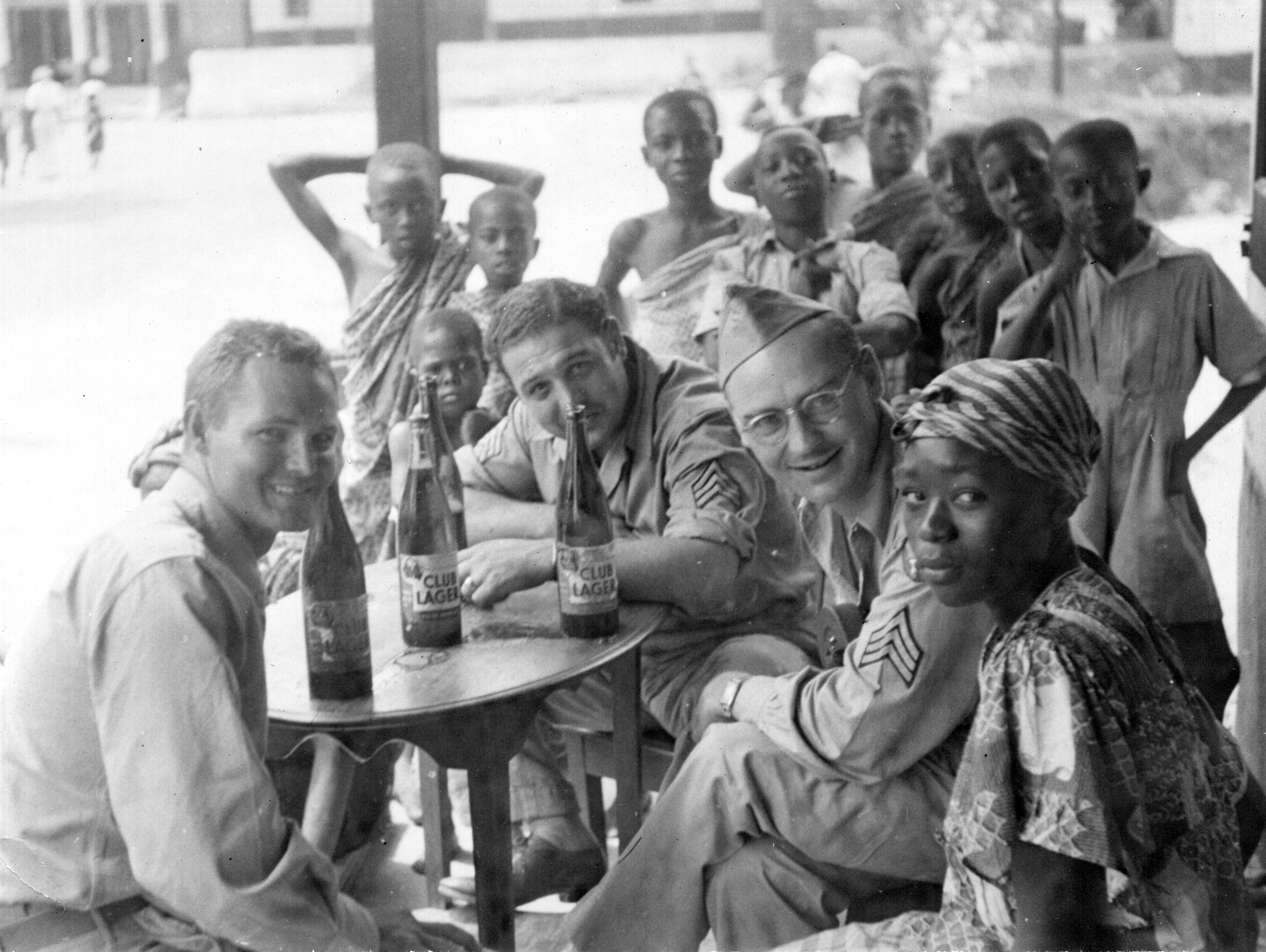
American soldiers drinking CLUB Lager in West Africa, 1942.

Ghanaians embraced CLUB Premium Lager after World War II, necessitating that production keep pace with demand. Factory buildings were, therefore, enlarged and new machinery and equipment were installed, bringing the company to current standards of brewery technology. In the early 60s, the capacity of its fermenting hall was also enlarged with the installation of 20 new fermenting vessels. Another key achievement was the construction of a new bottling plant, which was equipped with a new bottling line comprising a bottle-washing machine, a filler/corker unit, pasteurizer, and a labelling machine.

In the 60s, ABL embarked upon a 4-Phase expansion programme that would have more than doubled its production capacity. While general economic constraints prevented that from happening, the company succeeded in completing Phase 1 which involved the installation of a new 700,000 hectolitre brew house at C5 million.

=== New Ownership and Expansion ===
The company's ownership was revised in 1975 following the passage of an Investment Law. Consequently, Overseas Breweries Ltd. acquired 45% shares, the government of Ghana bought 40% shares, and the remaining 15% shares were floated to the Ghanaian public. In view of this new arrangement, Sekar Limited was brought in as Technical Management, formally heralding the company's new and current identity as Accra Brewery Limited (ABL).

=== As Accra Brewery Ltd ===
In spite of the company's initial successes and strides, it was still saddled with problems. Favourable government policies in the mid-80s, however, improved its fortunes, resulting in increased production levels to meet consumer demand. The company was also able to continue its stalled 4-Phase programme, which consisted of the installation of a new Bottling Plant and Warehouse pegged at C6.2 billion with a 100% production target. On the occasion of its 60th milestone, the company financed the construction of a new bottling hall and warehouse at a cost of C1.8 billion, from its own resources through re-investment of earned profit.

=== As a subsidiary of SABMiller Plc ===
In 1997, SABMiller Plc {then South African Breweries (SAB)} acquired controlling shares of ABL through its acquisition of Overseas Breweries Ltd. The acquisition and subsequent infusion of capital and expertise propelled the expansion of its brand portfolio with the introduction of Castle Milk Stout, and very recently, Beta Malt, unto the Ghanaian market. Capping this era is the US$130 million expansion project that has resulted in the construction and installation of three new packaging lines warehouse with hard stand and loading area electricity substation two additional power generators ten new beer tanks two additional water storage tanks a water treatment plant sidewalks for location road and a new entrance with gate house and offices. The expansion was necessary and urgent as a result of the increasing need to meet consumer demands.

=== As a subsidiary of Anheuser-Busch InBev (ABInBev) ===
In October 2016, ABL became a subsidiary of ABInBev after it acquired SABMiller Plc.

== Brands ==
ABL has been manufacturing CLUB Premium Lager for over 85 years. CLUB Premium Lager sold under the tagline, "Beer deԑ ԑnoaa ne CLUB" and the moniker 'Charlie' is Ghana's #1 selling beer. The company introduced CLUB Shandy in the early 1990s, and Eagle Lager in the 2010s while Beta Malt in PET pack was introduced in 2015. The company launched Belgian pilsner, Stella Artois, and Eagle Extra Stout, Beta Malt in Returnable Glass Bottles (RGB) in 2017, and Budweiser in 2019.
