= GCB Bank =

Bank in Ghana

GCB Bank Ltd
- Type: Public
- Traded as: GSE: GCB
- Industry: Financial services
- Founded: 1953; 73 years ago
- Headquarters: Accra, Ghana
- Key people: Joshua Alabi; Chairman; Farihan Alhassan; Managing Director
- Products: Loans, Savings, Checking, Investments, Debit Cards, Mobile Banking, Credit Cards, Mortgages
- Revenue: ▲ Aftertax:GHS:326 million (2018)
- Total assets: US$ 1.7 Billion (GHS:9.7 billion) (2018)
- Number of employees: 2,299 (2019)

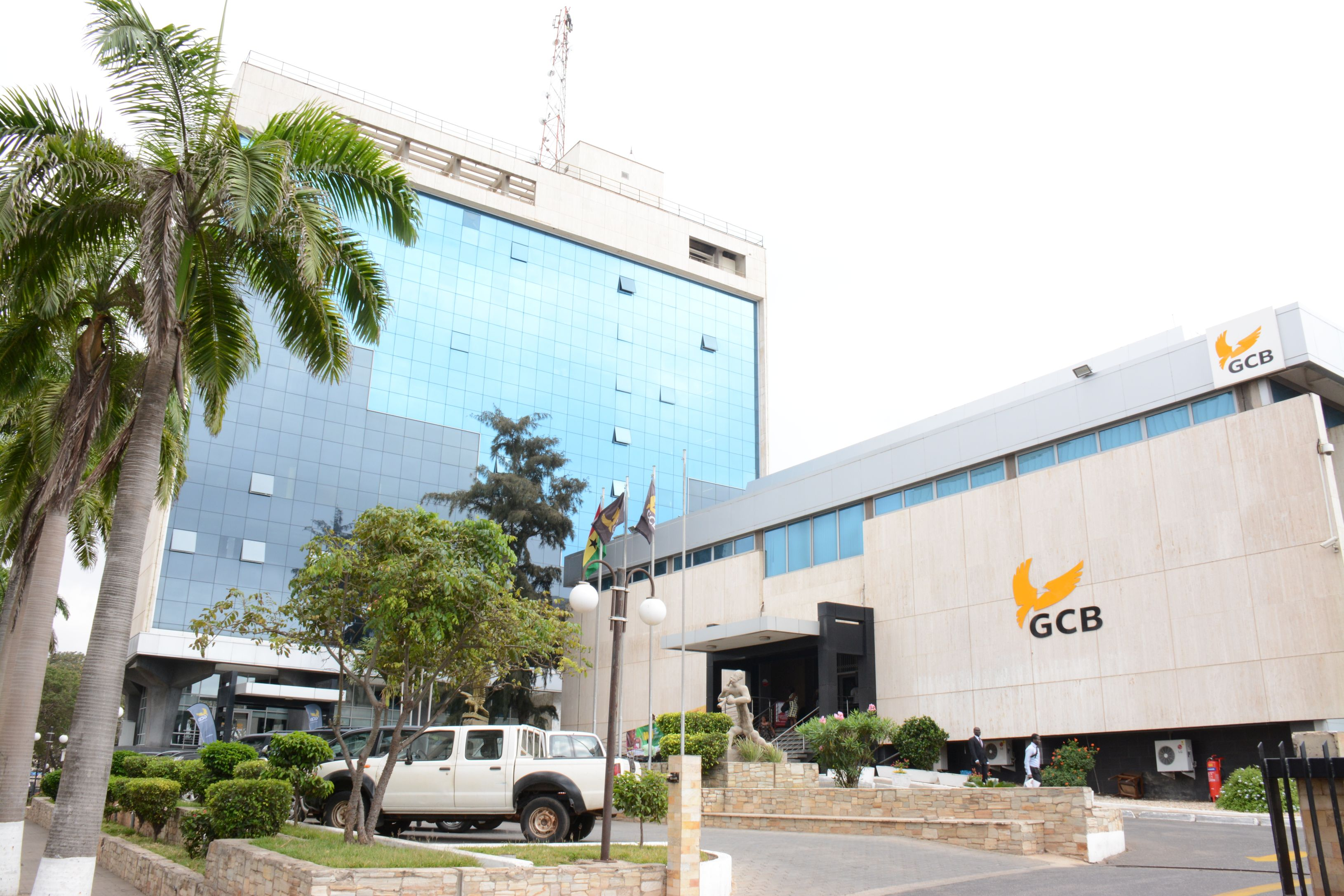
GCB Bank Ltd. High Street

GCB Bank Limited formally known as Ghana Commercial Bank is the largest bank in Ghana in terms of total operating assets and share of industry deposits, with 14.2% of total industry deposits. In August 2017, the Bank of Ghana, the nation's central bank, announced that it had approved a Purchase and Assumption transaction with GCB Bank Limited for the transfer of all deposits and selected assets of UT Bank and Capital Bank (Ghana) to GCB Bank Ltd.

== Overview ==
GCB Bank Ltd is Ghana's largest indigenous financial institution with 185 branches. As of December 2018, the bank's total assets were valued at about GHS9.7billions+, with shareholders' equity of approximately GHS:1.3billion+.

In a report issued by PwC Ghana, a member of PricewaterhouseCoopers International Limited indicated GCB Bank as part of the Top 7 banks in Ghana controlling 56.3% of the market share with the bank representing 8.7%.

At the 28th Annual General Meeting (AGM), GCB Bank posted a profit of GH¢831.9m before tax for the year 2021.

== History ==
The bank was founded on May 20, 1953, with 27 employees, as the Bank of the Gold Coast. Initially, it focused on serving Ghanaian traders, farmers, and business people, who could not obtain financing from the expatriate banks. In 1957, when Ghana attained Independence, the bank re-branded to Ghana Commercial Bank, to concentrate on commercial banking, since Bank of Ghana had been created to function as the central bank and banking regulator.

In the beginning, the bank was wholly owned by the Government of Ghana. However, in 1996, when government shareholding stood at 51.17%, the stock of the bank was listed on the Ghana Stock Exchange. In 2013, the bank renamed itself GCB Bank Ltd, with a new brand identity which was launched at the end of 2014. Today, GCB Bank Ltd serves the banking needs of large corporations, parastatal companies, small and medium enterprises as well as individuals. As of December 2016, the bank employs 1,532 staff, in branches distributed in all 10 regions of the Republic of Ghana.

GCB Capital Limited has launched the Golden Eagle Unit Trust, a collective investment scheme designed to provide accessible investment opportunities to both individual and institutional investors in Ghana. With a minimum investment of GHS 100, the trust offers a diversified portfolio of local and international assets, including government securities, corporate bonds, equities, and real estate investment trusts (REITs). The fund will be valued daily, ensuring regular performance updates and easy entry or exit for investors. The launch aims to expand investment access and transparency for a broader range of investors.

== Ownership ==
The shares of stock of GCB Bank Ltd are listed on the Ghana Stock Exchange and are part of the exchange's GSE All-Share Index. The government of Ghana maintains 21.4% shareholding in the bank, while the remaining 78.6% is owned by institutional and private investors. As of December 2016, there are about 21 investors in the stock of the bank as depicted in the table below:

GCB Bank Ltd Stock Ownership
Rank	Name of Owner	Percentage Ownership
1	SOCIAL SECURITY AND NATIONAL INSURANCE TRUST	1.50
2	MINISTRY OF FINANCE & ECONOMIC PLANNING	21.36
3	SCGN/Northern Trust Global Services Limited	6.79
4	DANIEL OFORI	53.81
5	SCGN/JPMC RE DUET AFRICA OPPORTUNITIES MASTER FUND, IC GTI:AEX26	2.19
6	SCGN/BANQUE PICTET & CIE SA RE NON TAX 6275J	2.10
7	PRIMARK BANK LIMITED PRIMARK BANK PLC PAC ATM MASTER CARD VISA VERVE	1.13
8	SCGN/CITIBANK KUWAIT INV AUTHORITY	0.98
9	SCGN/BANQUE PICTET & CIE SA RE NON TAX 6275J	0.77
10	GHANA REINSURANCE COMPANY LTD GENERAL BUSINESS	0.68
11	SCGN/SSB TEACHER RETIREMENT, SYSTEMS OF TEXAS FD-TRAB	0.68
12	SCGN/CITIBANK LONDON OP- AFRICAN FUND, NON-UCITS	0.63
13	SCGN/SSB EATON VANCE STRUCTURED, EMERGING MARKET FUND	0.61
14	GHANA COCOA BOARD	0.60
15	SCGN/'EPACK INVESTMENT FUND LTD TRANSACTION EIFLE	0.57
16	SCGN/PICTET & CIE EUROPE S.A LUX RE BLAKENEY	0.53
17	SCGN/SSB EATON VANCE TAX, MANAGED EMERGING MARKET FUND	0.52
18	STD NOMS/BNYM SA NV/ADV SRS TRST/AST PTRIC EMG MKT	0.45
19	SCGN/JP MORGAN CHASE DUET GAMLA LIV AFRICA, OPPORTUNITIES FUND IC	0.44
20	AFRIKANSK STD NOMS/BNYM SANV/KAPFRG INVESTIN PRO	0.45
21	OTHERS	24.90
	Total	100.00

== Leadership ==
- Hon. Kojo Oppong Nkrumah
- Joshua Alabi - Board Chairman
- Farihan Alhassan - Managing Director
- Socrates Afram - Deputy Managing Director (Finance)
- Emmanuel Odartey Lamptey - Deputy Managing Director (Operations)
- Samuel Kwame Yedu Aidoo - Executive Director (Wholesale and Investment Banking)
- Osmani Aludiba Ayuba - Director
- Francis Arthur-Collins - Director
- Queen Mother of Denkyira Nana Saraa III - Director
- Nick Amartefio - Director
- Lydia Gyamera Essah - Director
- Alhaji Alhassan Yakubu- Director- https://www.gcbbank.com.gh/board-members/489-alhaji-alhassan-yakubu

== Honors ==
- The current Managing Director of GCB, Mr. Farihan Alhassan has been honored with a prestigious Special African Leadership Commendation Award for his tremendous contribution to the banking sector in Ghana and Africa.
- GCB Bank named Regional Bank of the year - West Africa at the 20th African Banker Awards held at Brazzaville, Congo.

== Branches ==
GCB Bank Ltd maintains its headquarters in Accra, the capital of Ghana and the largest city in the country. The bank has over 184 branches distributed across most major urban areas of Ghana, with plans to refurbish many of them following a re-brand in 2014.

GCB Bank Expands to 214 Branches as it assumes the management of Two Banks.

== Domestic Debt Exchange Programme (DDEP) ==
The Government of Ghana launched its Domestic Debt Exchange Programme (DDEP) on 5 December 2022 to manage public debt and prevent the further financial collapse of the Ghanaian economy through a voluntary exchange of GHS137 billion of domestic notes and bonds of the Republic. When the programme closed on Friday, 10 February 2023 about 80 per cent of bondholders voluntarily subscribed.

The bank recorded a loss of ¢743.5 million in 2022, compared to a profit before tax of ¢832.0 million in the prior year.

== See also ==
- List of banks in Ghana
- Ghana Stock Exchange
- Economy of Ghana
