= Ghana Stock Exchange =

Stock exchange in Ghana

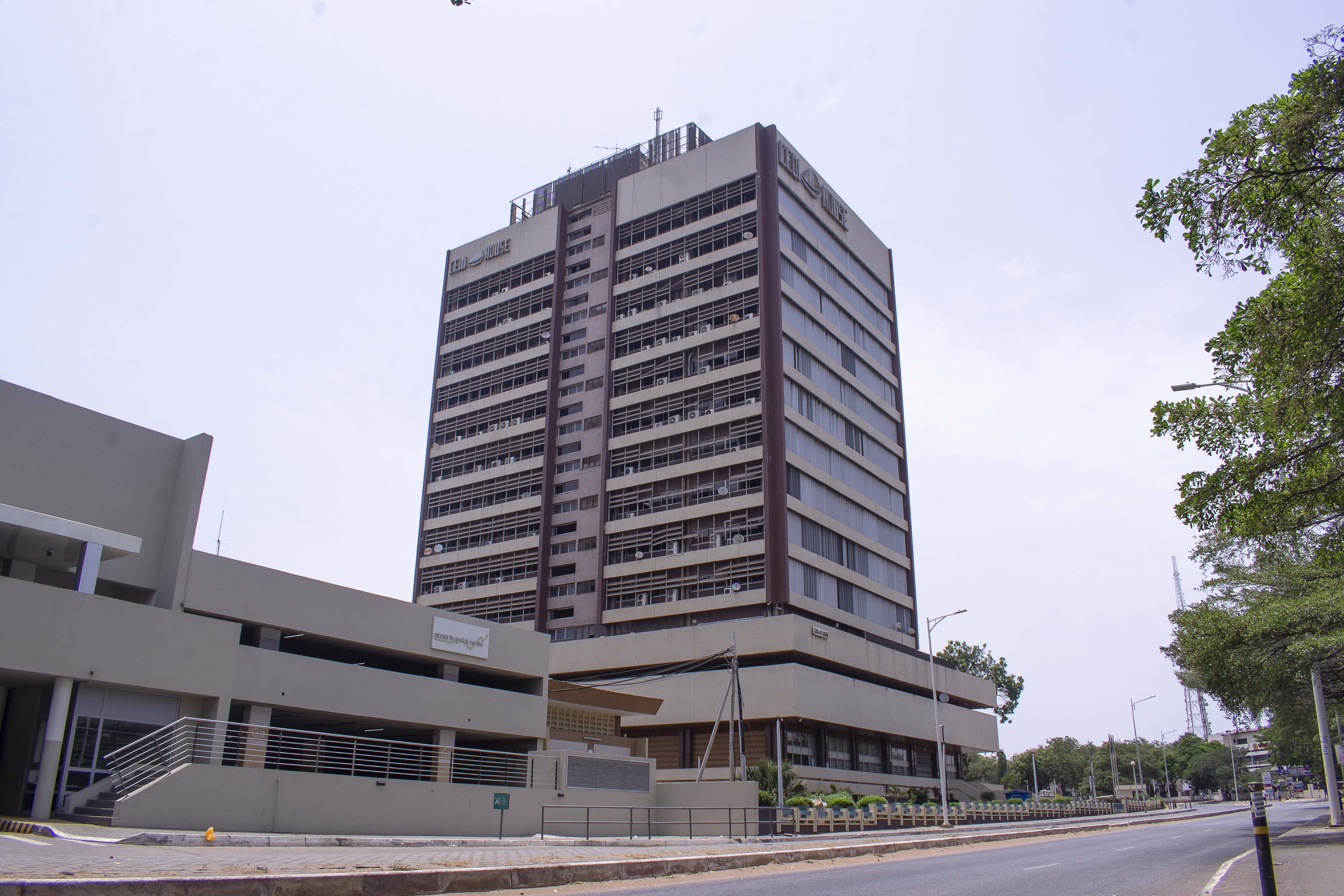
- Type: Stock exchange
- Location: Accra, Greater Accra, Ghana
- Coordinates: 5°33′20″N 0°12′08″W
- Founded: July 10, 1989
- Key people: Abena Amoah Managing Director
- Currency: Ghana cedi
- No. of listings: 49
- Market cap: GH¢172.04 billion (December 2025)
- Website: gse.com.gh

The Ghana Stock Exchange (GSE) is the principal securities exchange of Ghana. It was incorporated in July 1989 as a private company limited by guarantee, recognised as an authorised stock exchange in October 1990, and began trading on 12 November 1990. The exchange was officially launched on 11 January 1991 and moved to its offices at Cedi House, Liberia Road, Accra, in September 1993.

The GSE provides a market for the trading and listing of securities, including shares, bonds and other instruments. It operates the Main Market and the Ghana Alternative Market (GAX), with the Main Market subject to more stringent requirements and GAX designed with less stringent requirements for small and medium-sized businesses. The exchange also works with the Ghana Fixed Income Market for debt securities and publishes regular market reports and trading data.

As of the Ghana Stock Exchange's December 2025 Equities Market Report, the GSE Composite Index closed at 8,770.25 points, representing a year-to-date gain of 79.40%, while the GSE Financial Stocks Index closed at 4,647.17 points, up 95.19%. Market capitalization reached GH¢172.04 billion at the end of December 2025, compared with GH¢111.36 billion at the end of December 2024, a year-on-year increase of 54.50%.

== History and operations ==
The Ghana Stock Exchange traces its origins to earlier efforts to establish a securities market in Ghana, including the Stock Exchange Act of 1971 and the incorporation of the Accra Stock Exchange company, which never operated. In February 1989, the PNDC government established a 10-member National Committee on the creation of a stock exchange, chaired by Dr. G. K. Agama, then Governor of the Bank of Ghana. The Ghana Stock Exchange was incorporated in July 1989 as a private company limited by guarantee, recognised as an authorised stock exchange in October 1990, and began trading on 12 November 1990. It was officially launched on 11 January 1991.

The GSE All-Share Index was developed and adopted in September 1994. In January 1995, the exchange was named the best-performing emerging market globally by the 1994 Annual Report and Statistics of the Fédération Internationale des Bourses de Valeurs, after the GSE All-Share Index increased by 124%. The exchange later introduced a manual continuous trading system in March 2001 and reduced its settlement period from five business days to three business days in April 2003.

The GSE modernised its operations during the late 2000s and early 2010s. Daily trading began in August 2008, and in March 2009 the exchange introduced the GSE Automated Trading System, automated clearing and settlement, and created a Settlement Guarantee Fund. In January 2011, the exchange developed the GSE Composite Index (GSE-CI) and the GSE Financial Stocks Index (GSE-FSI), replacing the older index structure.

The GSE operates two listing categories: the Official List and the Ghana Alternative Market (GAX), with GAX aimed at small and medium-sized enterprises. Securities that may be listed include preference shares and ordinary equities, corporate bonds and notes, municipal bonds and notes, government bonds and notes, closed-end unit trusts and mutual funds. The exchange publishes market reports, trading volumes, prices, market capitalisation data and other market statistics for transparency and market information.

The GSE Composite Index is a market-capitalisation-weighted index based on the volume-weighted average closing prices of listed ordinary shares. The GSE Financial Stocks Index tracks listed financial-sector stocks, including banking and insurance companies. Both indices have a base date of 31 December 2010 and a base value of 1,000.

In May 2024, Atlantic Lithium received approval to list on the Ghana Stock Exchange by introduction, adding a mining-sector lithium company linked to the Ewoyaa lithium project to the exchange. The company is listed by the GSE as Atlantic Lithium Limited.

== Hours ==
Trading in equities on the Ghana Stock Exchange takes place on working days from 10:00 a.m. to about 3:00 p.m. Ghana time. The exchange's equity trading schedule includes a pre-open session from 9:30 a.m. to 10:00 a.m., followed by a continuous auction session from 10:00 a.m. to 3:00 p.m. Trading does not take place on Saturdays, Sundays or holidays declared by the exchange.

Trading on the fixed income market takes place from 9:00 a.m. to 4:00 p.m. on working days.

== Licensed brokers ==
Trading on the Ghana Stock Exchange is carried out through Licensed Dealing Members (LDMs), which are broker-dealer firms authorised to deal in securities on the exchange. The GSE states that LDMs have direct trading access to the exchange and may execute equity and fixed-income trades for retail, institutional and foreign investors.

The exchange maintains a current list of Licensed Dealing Members, including their contact details and sponsored companies. Current LDMs listed by the GSE include Amber Securities, Black Star Brokerage, Bullion Securities, CDH Securities, Chapel Hill Denham Securities, Databank Brokerage, EDC Stockbrokers, IC Securities Ghana, NTHC Securities, Republic Securities, SBG Securities Ghana, SIC Brokerage, Strategic African Securities and others.

== See also ==
- List of companies of Ghana
- GSE Composite Index
- List of African stock exchanges
- List of stock exchanges
- List of stock exchanges in the Commonwealth of Nations
