= Presidency of John Atta Mills =

Ghanaian presidential administration from 2009 to 2012

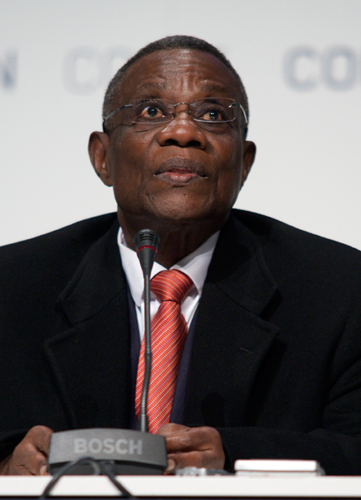
- Mills in 2009
- Presidency of John Atta Mills; 7 January 2009 – 24 July 2012
- President: John Atta Mills
- Cabinet: See list
- Party: National Democratic Congress
- Election: 2008
- Seat: Jubilee House
- Seal of the President

The presidency of John Atta Mills began on 7 January 2009 and ended on 24 July 2012. John Atta Mills, an NDC candidate, became the 3rd President of the Ghanaian Fourth Republic after he defeated NPP opponent Nana Akufo-Addo in the 2008 Ghanaian general election. After his death on 24 July 2012, John Atta Mills was succeeded by his vice president, John Mahama in accordance to the 1992 Constitution. He was the first Ghanaian Head of State to die in office.

From 1997 to 2001, Atta Mills served as Vice-President of Ghana under the Rawlings government. He was unsuccessful in his bid for presidency in the 2000 and 2004 Ghanaian general election. During his 2008 campaign he began the Better Ghana Agenda policy. Amongst his accomplishments as president was presiding over and initiating Ghana's first ever foray into oil production, after oil was discovered in commercial quantities under his predecessor, John Kufuor. In his second year, the president enabled a GDP rebasement which adjusted the growth figures for the Ghanaian economy upwards. Atta Mills also signed the Data Protection Act in May 2012.

== General election and inauguration ==
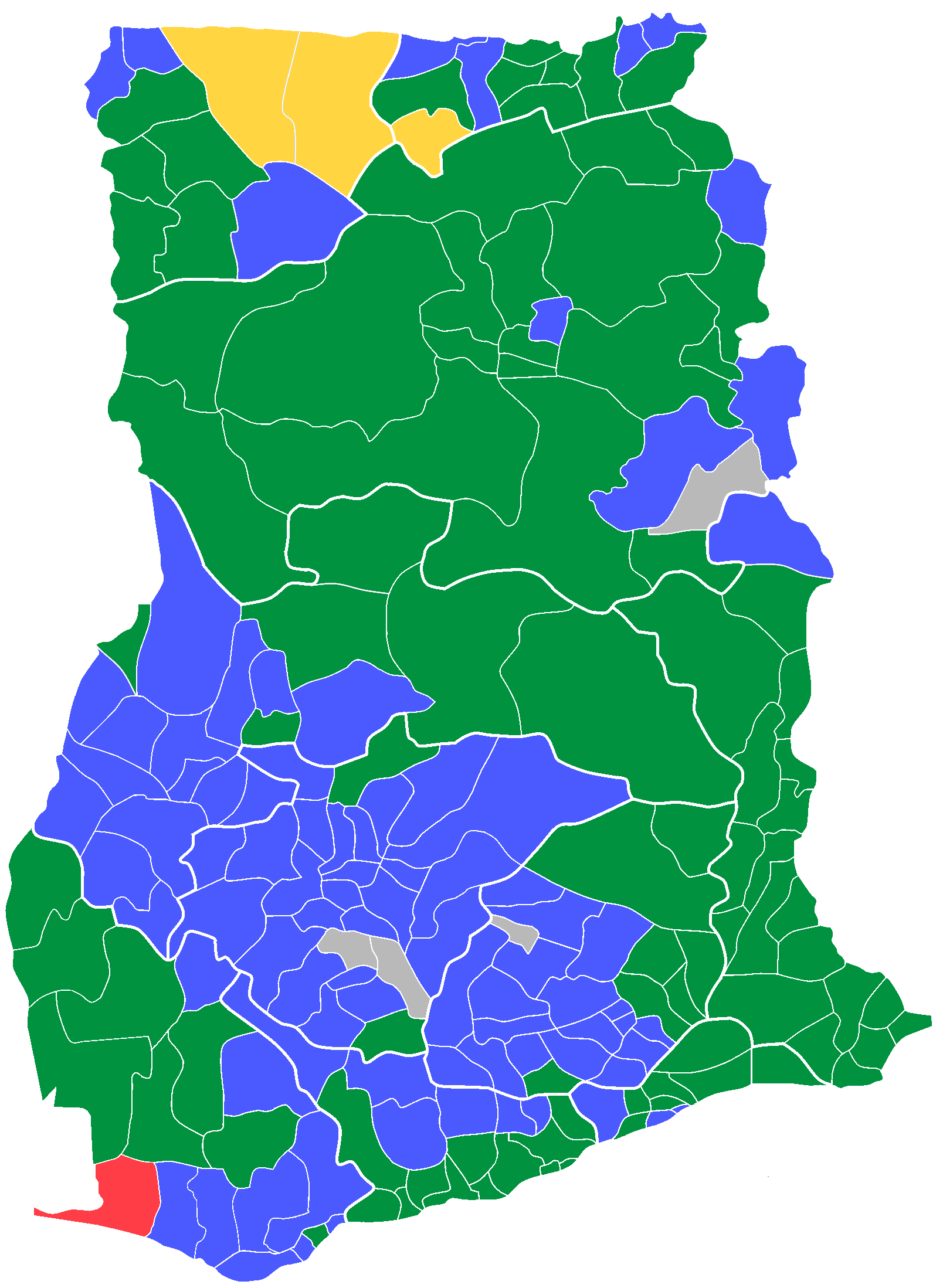
Map showing the party-political geography of Ghana after the 2008 parliamentary elections. Green: National Democratic Congress Blue: New Patriotic Party Yellow: People's National Convention Red: Convention People's Party Grey: Independent

On 21 December 2006, he became the NDC's candidate for the 2008 presidential election, winning his party's ticket by an 81.4% result (1,362 votes), far ahead of his opponents, Ekwow Spio-Garbrah, Alhaji Mahama Iddrisu, and Eddie Annan. In the 2008 election, John Agyekum Kufuor was no longer eligible to run as president, having served two terms. It was during this time that the term Better Ghana Agenda was coined.

Mills' main opponent from the New Patriotic Party was now Nana Akufo-Addo. Mills ran under the campaign slogan of "A Better Man for a Better Ghana," on a platform of change. He said: "People are complaining. They're saying that their standard of living has deteriorated these past eight years. So if Ghana is a model of growth, it's not translating into something people can feel." The result of the first ballot had Akufo-Addo in front with 49.13% of the vote to Mills' 47.92%, however, a run-off second round of voting was needed. The second round of voting took place on 28 December 2008. The result was a slim lead held by Mills, but due to problems with the distribution of ballots, the Tain constituency, located in the Brong-Ahafo Region, was forced to vote again on 2 January 2009. Mills was certified as the victor in the run-off election on January 3, 2009, by a margin of less than one percent. It is to date the closest election in Ghanaian history. Self-described as a social democrat who believed in the concept of social welfare espoused by Kwame Nkrumah Mills embraced a political platform that was more comprehensive and less divisive than that of either Nkrumah or Rawlings. John Atta Mills was sworn in as president on 7 January 2009 in a peaceful transition after Akufo-Addo was narrowly defeated.

== Personnel ==
Office(s)	Officeholder	Term
President	John Atta Mills	2009 to 2012
Vice President	John Dramani Mahama	2009–2012
Cabinet Ministers
Office(s)	Officeholder	Term
Minister for Foreign Affairs and Regional Integration	Muhammad Mumuni	2009 – 2012
Minister for the Interior	Cletus Avoka (MP); Martin A. B. K. Amidu; Benjamin Kunbuor; William Kwasi Aboah	2009 – 2010; 2010 – 2011; 2011 – 2012; 2012
Minister for Finance and Economic Planning	Kwabena Dufuor	2009 – 2012
Minister for Defence	Lt. Gen. Joseph Henry Smith	2009 – 2012
Attorney General and Minister for Justice	Mrs. Betty Mould-Iddrisu; Martin Amidu; Benjamin Kunbuor	2009 – 2011; 2011 – 2012; 2012
Minister for Education	Alex Tettey-Enyo (MP); Mrs. Betty Mould-Iddrisu; Lee Ocran	2009 – 2011; 2011 – 2012; 2012
Minister for Food and Agriculture	Kwesi Ahwoi	2009 – 2012
Minister for Trade and Industry	Hanna Tetteh	2009 – 2012
Minister for Health	George Sipa-Adjah Yankey; Benjamin Kunbuor; Joseph Yieleh Chireh (MP); Alban Bagbin (MP)	2009 – 2009; 2009 – 2011; 2011 – 2012; 2012
Minister for Local Government and Rural Development	Joseph Yieleh Chireh (MP); Samuel Kwame Ofosu-Ampofo	2009 – 2011; 2011 – 2012
Minister for Tourism	Juliana Azumah-Mensah (MP); Zita Okaikoi; Akua Sena Dansua (MP)	2009 – 2010; 2010 – 2011; 2011 – 2012
Minister for Energy	Joe Oteng-Adjei	2009 – 2012
Minister for Transport	Mike Allen Hammah (MP); Collins Dauda (MP)	2009 – 2011; 2011 – 2012
Minister for Roads and Highways	Joe Kwashie Gidisu (MP)	2009 – 2012
Minister for Lands and Natural Resources	Collins Dauda (MP); Mike Allen Hammah (MP)	2009 – 2011; 2011 – 2012
Minister for Women and Children's Affairs	Akua Sena Dansua (MP); Juliana Azumah-Mensah (MP)	2009 – 2010; 2010 – 2012
Minister for Communications	Haruna Iddrisu	2009 – 2012
Minister for Environment, Science and Technology	Sherry Ayitey	2009 – 2012
Minister for Information	Zita Okaikoi; John Tia (MP); Fritz Baffour (MP)	2009 – 2010; 2010 – 2012; 2012
Minister for Employment and Social Welfare	Stephen Amoanor Kwao (MP); Enoch Teye Mensah (MP); Moses Asaga (MP)	2009 – 2010; 2010 – 2012; 2012
Minister for Water Resources, Works and Housing	Albert Abongo (MP); Alban Bagbin (MP); Enoch Teye Mensah (MP)	2009 – 2010; 2010 – 2012; 2012
Minister for Youth and Sports	Muntaka Mohammed Mubarak (MP); Abdul-Rashid Pelpuo (MP); Akua Sena Dansua (MP); Clement Kofi Humado (MP)	2009 – 2009; 2009 – 2010; 2010 – 2011; 2011 – 2012
Minister for Chieftaincy and Culture	Alexander Asum-Ahensah (MP)	2009 – 2012
Regional Ministers
Region	Officeholder	Term
Ashanti Regional Minister	Kofi Opoku-Manu; Dr. Kwaku Agyemang-Mensah	2009 – 2011; 2011 – 2012
Brong Ahafo Region	Kwadwo Nyamekye Marfo	2009 – 2012
Central Region	Ama Benyiwa-Doe	2009 – 2012
Eastern Region	Samuel Kwame Ofosu-Ampofo; Dr Kwasi Akyem Apea-Kubi; Victor Emmanuel Smith	2009 – 2011; 2011 – 2012; 2012
Greater Accra Regional Minister	Nii Armah Ashitey	2009 –2012
Northern Region	S.S. Nanyina; Moses Bukari Mabengba	2009 – 2010; 2010 – 2012
Upper East Region	Mark Woyongo	2009 – 2012
Upper West Region	Mahmud Khalid; Issaku Saliah; Amin Amidu Sulemana	2009 – 2010; 2010 – 2012; 2012
Volta Regional Minister	Joseph Amenowode (MP); Henry Ford Kamel (MP)	2009 – 2012; 2012
Western Region	Paul Evans Aidoo (MP)	2009 – 2012
Ministers of State
Office(s)	Officeholder	Term
Minister at the Presidency	Alhassan Azong	2009 – 2012
Minister at the Presidency	Mrs Hautie Dubie Alhassan	2009 – 2012
Minister at the Presidency	Amadu Seidu	2009 – 2009
Minister at the Presidency	Stephen Amoanor Kwao (MP)	2010 – 2012
Minister at the Presidency	Rafatu Halutie A. Dubie	? – 2012
Minister at the Presidency	Dominic Azimbe Azumah (MP)	2012

=== government changes ===
==== 2009 ====
The first batch of ministers in the NDC government were sworn in on 13 January 2009. Betty Mould-Iddrisu who was initially out of the country was later sworn in as Ghana's first female Attorney General and Minister for Justice. Muntaka Mohammed Mubarak, the Minister for Sports, resigned on 25 June 2009 following findings of financial impropriety against him by a committee set up by government. Two additional ministers, Dr. George Yankey, Minister for Health and Ahmed Seidu, Minister at the Presidency tended their resignations on 10 October 2009, following allegations of having accepted bribes from a United Kingdom company many years prior to the formation of this government.

In October 2009, when Ghana U-20 won that year's FIFA U-20 World Cup after defeating Brazil U-20 in the final match, Mills promised each player a cheque of GHS 10,000, which was invested until their release and cashing in 2025.

==== 2010 ====
On 25 January 2010, President Mills conducted his first cabinet reshuffle. There were changes of ministers in 7 ministries and one change of regional minister. In all, four new ministers came into government including Alban Bagbin, the Majority Leader in parliament and his deputy, John Tia. Also in were Enoch T. Mensah, a former minister in the Rawlings NDC government and Martin Amidu, the new Interior minister. On 11 May 2010, Mahmud Khalid, the Upper West Regional Minister was dismissed by President Mills. Khalid suggested members of his party lobbied for his dismissal. Alhaji Issaku Saliah, a former MP for Wa West was nominated as his replacement and approved by parliament on 23 July 2010.

==== 2011 ====
The second cabinet reshuffle by President Mills was in January 2011. 9 ministries were affected in all. One Regional minister was also changed. Notable changes including replacing Betty Mould-Iddrisu with Martin Amidu as Attorney-General. Zita Okaikoi and Alex Tettey-Enyo were dropped from government.

==== 2012 ====
In January 2012, Martin Amidu was sacked by President Mills. This followed allegations he made suggesting some members of the ruling party may be corrupt. He was asked to substantiate his allegations by Mills and subsequently sacked ostensibly because he was unable to do so. A few days later, Betty Mould-Iddrissu, Minister for Education who was the Attorney-General before Amidu tended her resignation as Minister for Education. This was accepted by President Mills who appointed Enoch Mensah to replace her as Minister for Education temporarily. A cabinet reshuffle was announced a few days later via a press release from the Office of the President. There were new ministers nominated for approval by parliament. These include William Kwasi Aboah for Interior, Lee Ocran for Education, Fritz Baffour MP for Ablekuma South for Information, Moses Asaga for Employment and Social Welfare, Dominic Azimbe Azumah, MP for Garu - Timpane – Minister of State and Amin Amidu Sulemani, Upper West Regional Minister designate. They were all sworn in on 24 February 2012 by President Mills after having been approved by the Parliament of Ghana. On 26 March 2012, President Mills appointed two new regional ministers. The former ambassador to the Czech Republic, Victor Emmanuel Smith became the new Eastern Region Minister and the MP for Buem, Henry Kamel Ford became the new Volta Region Minister.

== Policy ==
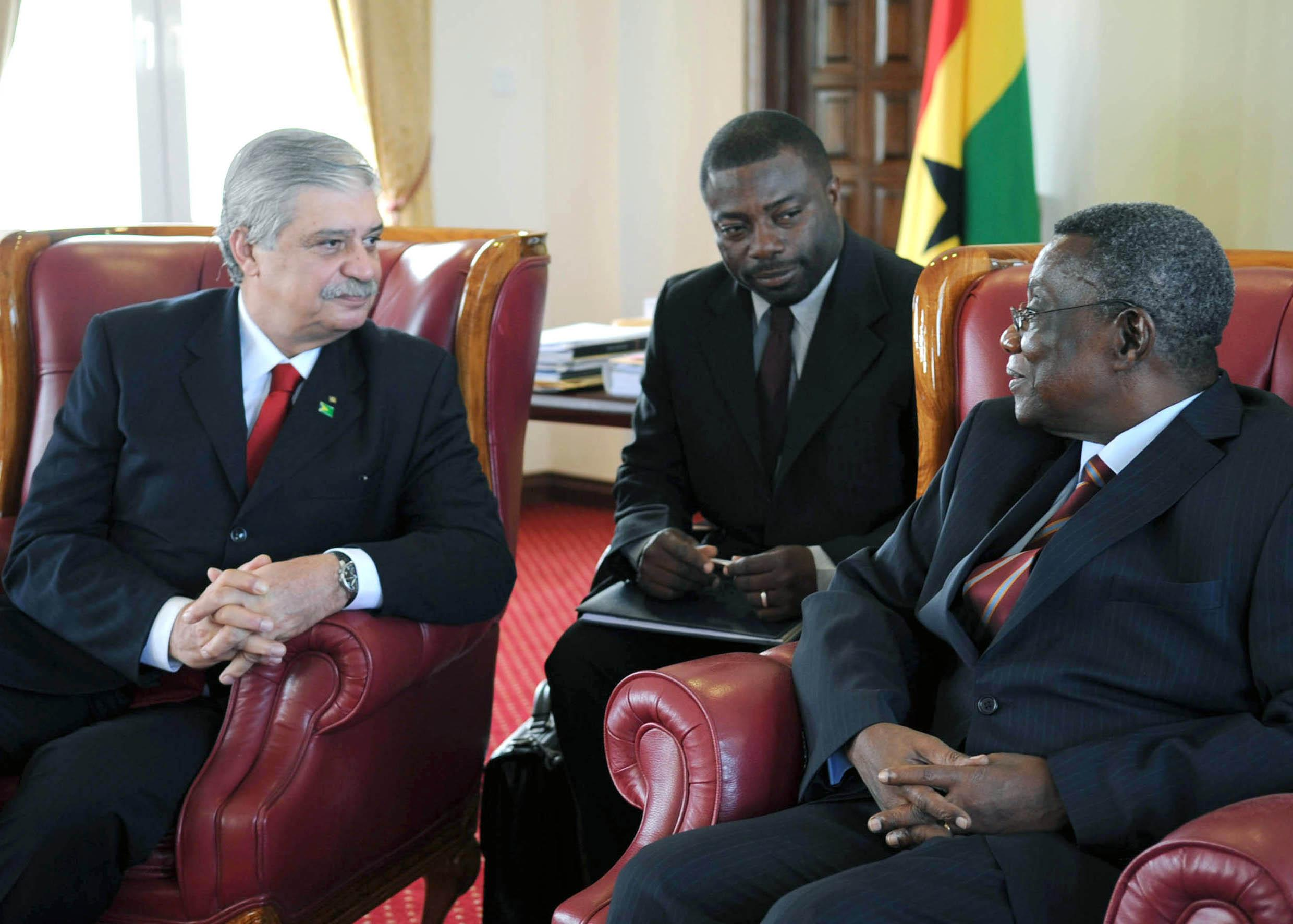
President Mills on a meeting with the Minister of Development of Brazil, Miguel Jorge

=== Economy ===
Under Mills, Ghana's stable economy experienced sustained reduced inflation leading to the attainment of single digit inflation of about 8.4% (one of the lowest inflation rates Ghana had attained in 42 years i.e. period between 1970 and 2012 as well as the lowest since June 1992 just before the start of Ghana's Fourth Republic) from a high of 18.1% in December 2008. This is indicative of prudent fiscal, monetary and other austerity policy measures that characterised his presidency to put the economy in healthy shape. The Ghanaian currency, the Cedi also stabilised as a result of these policies. In 2011, Ghana was the fastest growing economy in the world at 20.15% for the first half of the year and 14.4% at the end of the financial year according to the International Monetary Fund and EconomyWatch.com. Moreover, Ghana's budget deficit was reduced to 2% of the Gross Domestic Product during his tenure compared to 14.5% of GDP in 2008, just before he was elected as the President of Ghana. There was also a huge improvement in Ghana's gross international reserves and foreign direct investments (FDI) highlighting exceptional macroeconomic performance. The Mills government also implemented the Single Spine Salary system which increased compensation levels of all public sector workers. In a bid to improve the efficiency in revenue collection, Mills established the Ghana Revenue Authority which integrated Value Added Tax (VAT), Customs Excise and Preventive Service (CEPS) and Internal Revenue Service (IRS). Under his governance, Ghana met three out of the four primary convergence criteria for the proposed common currency, Eco of the West African Monetary Zone. These accomplishments led to renewed domestic and foreign investor confidence in Ghana's economy. During Mills' time in office, Ghana was adjudged the best place for doing business in West Africa and best West African performer in access to credit according to the 2011 World Bank Doing Business global rankings.

==== GDP rebasing ====
In 2010, the government rebased the economic statistics of the country pushing the GDP of Ghana up by more than 60%. This was carried out for the purpose of capturing new sectors of the economy such as oil exploration, forestation and telecommunications. The base year for calculations was changed from 1993 to 2006 in the process. The rebase moved Ghana into middle income status and it placed the country as the third largest in the ranking of GDP per person in West Africa behind Cape Verde and Nigeria. After the changes in statistics, the service sector became the largest sector of Ghana's economy with a share of 51%. Agriculture, which was initially the dominant sector, accounted for 30.2% after the economic rebasing whiles the industrial sector lagged behind with a share of 18.6%. The changes attracted discussions on the accuracy of GDP estimates, particularly in African countries.

=== Education ===
There was also an increase in the capitation grants (government subsidies towards public education) under Mills. The government also introduced a programme to provide free school uniforms to deprived communities while providing over 100,000 laptops or notebooks to school children to facilitate the learning process in a highly technological world. An initiative to provide free exercise books started under Mills. More than 23 million books were distributed. His government also expanded the school feeding programme to include 230 more schools. Government paid the full tuition fees for all teachers pursuing further studies through distance learning. A sustained program involving the Ministry of Education, the GETFUND, and resources allocated by the various District Assemblies have begun to ensure the elimination of schools under trees and provide all schools in the country with decent classroom infrastructure. Out of the 4,320 schools under trees, almost 1,700 schools under trees were eliminated across the country. The Mills administration also started a program to re-equip science resource centres in all districts of the country to enhance the teaching and learning of science. Two new specialized public universities were established during his tenure: the University of Health and Allied Sciences in the Volta Region and the University of Energy and Natural Resources in the Brong-Ahafo Region. As president, Mills established a working relationship between the Masters in Development Practice program (MDP) at the University of Winnipeg, Canada and the University for Development Studies Ghana, leading to a joint initiative on the study of development practice for Indigenous and traditional societies.

=== Health ===
During his term of office, the Mills government provided a facelift to many teaching, regional and district hospitals across the country by upgrading old facilities and providing newer ones such as more high-tech equipment and more beds in hospitals, particularly at the Tamale Teaching Hospital. His government also built several polyclinics to increase access to healthcare. The government also scaled up the National Ambulance Service to cover all districts in the nation. Increased collaboration between stakeholders led higher patronage of the National Health Insurance Scheme. Utilization of the scheme rose by 75%.

=== Governance and international relations ===
True to his promise to reduce the number of Ministerial appointees and run a lean government, the number of Ministers was significantly reduced from 87 of the previous Kufuor NPP government to 73 (a reduction of 16%) in the Mills-led government. It was projected that approximately $4 million was saved annually by this bold decision to run a small government. The hundreds of Special Assistants, Presidential Staffers and Spokespersons were also eliminated to improve fiscal efficiency. He commissioned a review of the 1992 Constitution of Ghana in a bid to improve upon the country's governance architecture. He held an annual media forum every year at the presidency to interact with journalists about socio-political issues.

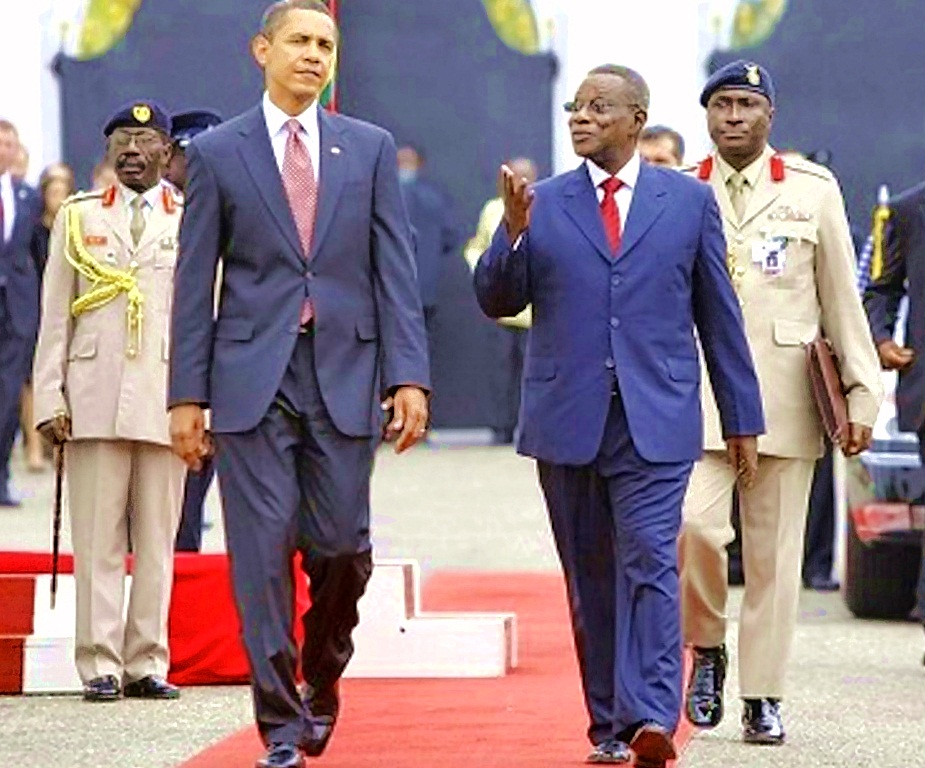
Obama & Atta Mills, 2009

President Atta Mills re-equipped and re-tooled the security agencies: the military, the police, the fire service, the Immigration, The Prisons Service and the Customs Excise and Preventive Service (CEPS). In order to ensure inter-generational equity because of the "finite nature of resource revenue" as well as financial security for future Ghanaian generations, the Mills government established in 2011, the Ghana Heritage Fund - a sovereign wealth fund generated from petroleum revenue accumulated from the country's oil and gas industry. John Atta Mills established the Media Development Fund to promote media excellence and freedom in the spirit of 1992 constitution. A few months prior to his death, he was praised by US President Barack Obama for making Ghana a "good news story" that had good democratic credentials. He also fostered economic ties with China in a bid strengthen Sino-Ghanaian bilateral relations. In 2009, the Journal of International Affairs at Columbia University featured Mills as one of the "Five Faces of African Innovation and Entrepreneurship" along with South African innovator, Euvin Naidoo and Mo Ibrahim, (founder of Celtel International and Chairman of the Mo Ibrahim Foundation) where he was lauded for his commitment to strengthening Ghana's Electoral Commission, National Media Commission and National Commission for Civic Education and more importantly, transparency in public institutions, particularly in the country's growing oil and gas sector. Mills' leadership style was very diplomatic, inclusive and less polarising than his predecessors. The BBC described his presidency as that of "a peacemaker who was never one to make disparaging comments in public" despite intense criticisms and vilification from his political supporters and opponents alike.

=== Agriculture, energy access and rural development ===
The Savannah Accelerated Development Authority (SADA) law was passed and work was started to open up the three Northern regions, Brong Ahafo and Volta Regions to enhance agriculture production and industrialisation. Under Mills, the producer price of cocoa increased appreciably to $1600 per tonne of 16 bags, which was the highest in the sub-region and the highest that had ever been paid to cocoa farmers in Ghana's entire history. Cocoa production also hit a record-breaking 1 million metric tonnes. Under the rural electrification programme, he extended national electricity coverage from 54% to 72% improving livelihoods in 1,700 communities and making Ghana the third best country in sub-Saharan Africa after Mauritius and South Africa with enhanced energy access.

== Illness and death ==
Mills died on 24 July 2012 at the 37 Military Hospital in Accra, three days after his 68th birthday. Though the cause of death was not immediately released, he had been suffering from throat cancer and had recently been to the US for medical reasons. Announcing his death, his office noted that he died hours after being taken ill, but a presidential aide said that he had complained of pains the day prior to his death. However, Mills' brother, Dr. Cadman Mills later disclosed during the graveside service that he had died from complications of a massive hemorrhagic stroke resulting from brain aneurysm. According to the BBC, his voice had degenerated in the previous few months. Vice president John Dramani Mahama was sworn in at about 20:00 GMT on the same day after the death of Mills. In accordance with Ghana's constitution, Mahama's tenure expired at the same time Mills' was due to end, by the end of the year just prior to an election, in which he was due to run.

=== State funeral ===
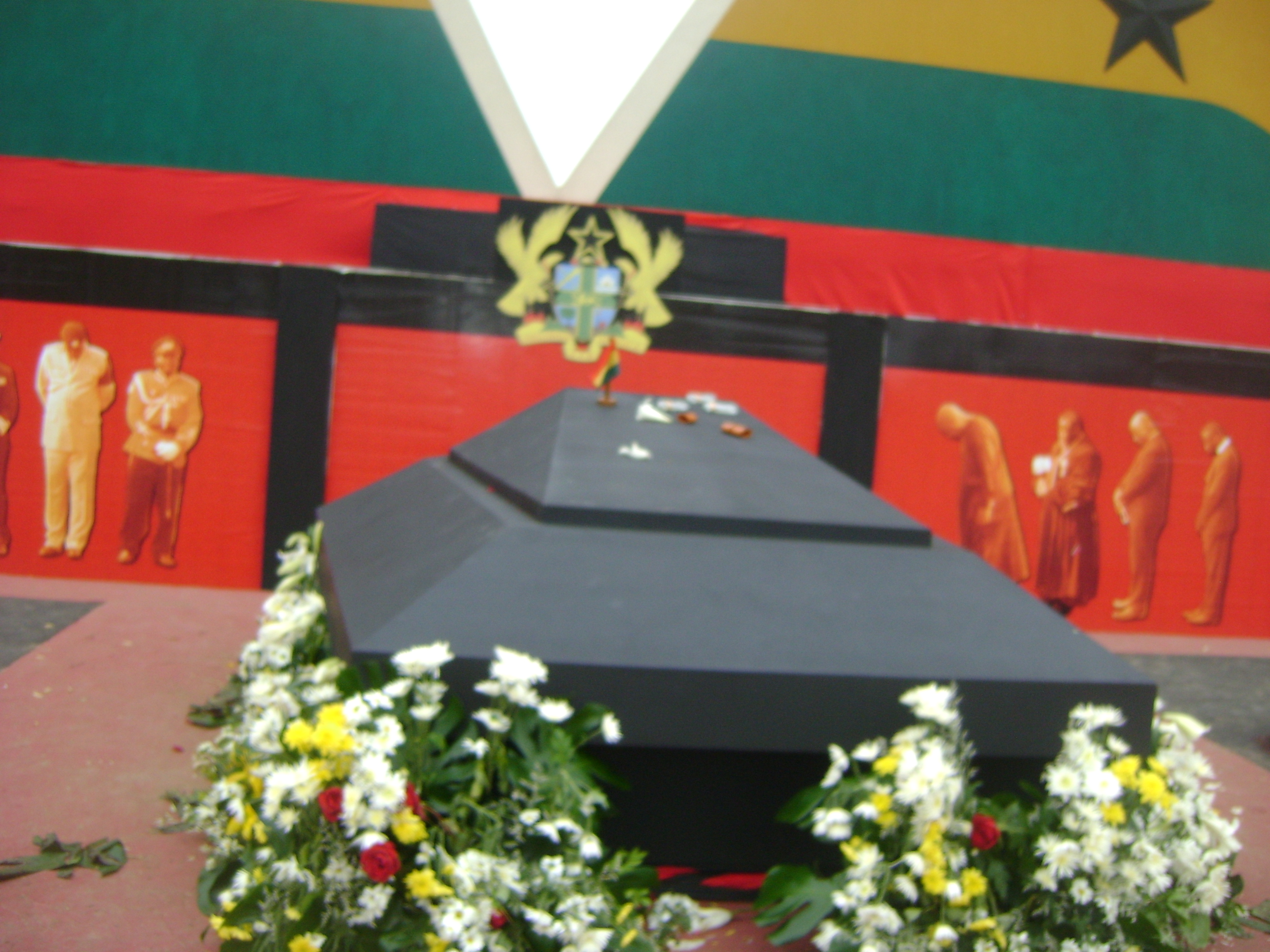
Atta Mills' gravestone at the Asomdwee Park, Accra in 2013

From 8–10 August, his body lay in state, and Ghanaian government officials, civil society, traditional leaders, the clergy, the general public and dignitaries such as Côte d'Ivoire's Alassane Ouattara, Liberia's Ellen Johnson Sirleaf, Nigeria's Goodluck Jonathan and Senegal's Macky Sall paid their last respects. Within this period, a two-night vigil was also held at the forecourt of the State House for cultural and musical performances such as traditional dirges, plays and tribute reading. Thousands streamed into the State House to pay their last respects to Mills as he lay in state with some mourners queuing for hours, many of them wailing with grief, in lines up to 10 km (6 miles) long per press reports. The body was then taken by a military cortege from the State House parliamentary complex to the Independence Square for the funerary services which was attended by 18 African Heads of State, 5 Vice-Presidents, United States Secretary of State, Hillary Clinton, former United Nations Secretary-General, Kofi Annan, president of the Pontifical Council for Justice and Peace, Cardinal Peter Turkson, Secretary-General of African, Caribbean and Pacific Group of States, Mohamed Ibn Chambas and several other international envoys. In all, there were 67 foreign delegations represented at the funeral. In addition to the over 50,000 people who gathered for the ceremony, his funeral was also attended by Benin's Thomas Boni Yayi, who said of Mills that he was "passionate about peace in Africa and in the region," as well as Togo's Faure Gnassingbe, who said "[Mills] was like a brother to me. I will surely miss him."

Ahead of religious ceremonies on Friday morning, the officially declared national day of mourning, a helicopter hovered over the area dropping leaflets reading: We want peaceful elections in 2012. The funeral ended with the release of a hundred white doves into the air to signify the peaceful nature of the departed leader.

After the funeral service, the president's body was taken on a military procession through some principal streets of the Ghanaian capital, Accra and then for burial in a newly created presidential mausoleum located in a bird sanctuary, Geese Park renamed Asomdwee (Peace) Memorial Park along the Marine Drive and next to the old seat of government, the 17th-century Fort Christiansborg, (also known as Osu Castle), which overlooks the Atlantic Ocean's Gulf of Guinea. As the sitting Commander-in-Chief, Mills was accorded full military honours, steeped in distinct and elaborate traditions, including a slow march by the Ghana Army, a fly-past of Ghana Air Force jets ejecting plumes of smoke in the national colours of red, gold and green, with the Ghana Navy ships also performing ceremonial manoeuvres on the shoreline behind the Independence Square and a 21-gun salute accompanying the playing of the bugle call, Sunset and the Christian hymn, Abide with Me (Eventide), in addition to sounding of the Last Post by military buglers after the casket had been lowered into the grave. Approximately 700 domestic and foreign media outlets received accreditation from the Ghanaian Ministry of Information to cover the event. An estimated 20–25 million television and online or web audience watched the three-day funeral ceremonies. The state funeral for the late president was most likely the largest gathering of people in one place at a single public event in recent or modern Ghanaian history.

=== International reactions ===
Following his death, a press statement from the United Nations Secretary-General, Ban Ki-moon said Mills "will be remembered for his statesmanship and years of dedicated service to his country." and French President Francois Hollande described Mills as " the guardian of institutions and the defender of Ghanaian democracy...committed to protecting national unity and profoundly attached to African unity and to the place of Africa within the international community." A White House statement from United States President Barack Obama called Mills a "strong advocate for human rights and for the fair treatment of all Ghanaians, tirelessly working to improve the lives of the Ghanaian people; He helped promote economic growth in Ghana in the midst of challenging global circumstances and strengthened Ghana's strong tradition of democracy" while Prime Minister of the United Kingdom, David Cameron praised Mills as "a tireless defender of democracy in West Africa and across the continent" Furthermore, the Prime Minister of Japan, Yoshihiko Noda lauded Mills for "his exemplary leadership which endeared him to the hearts of many and his contribution to strengthening the relationship between Ghana and Japan." FIFA President, Sepp Blatter offered his sympathies to Ghanaians on behalf of the worldwide football fraternity saying, "Ghana has lost a great football supporter and a supporter of the development of the game in the country." In a message of condolence from the Vatican City, Pope Benedict XVI "recalled Mills' years of public service and his dedication to democratic principles and entrusted the late president's soul to the providence of Almighty God"

The Secretary General of the Commonwealth of Nations, Kamalesh Sharma eulogised Atta Mills by describing him as "an inspiring leader, a strong advocate and champion of the Commonwealth, and our membership benefited enormously from his active participation in Commonwealth life and his wisdom." The West African regional body, ECOWAS said President Mills' death "has robbed the region of a voice of wisdom which enriched the discussions of the affairs of the Community." The African Union through its chairman, Yayi Boni said "the late President Mills had the same vision as the first President of Ghana, Kwame Nkrumah and it was a great, great loss for the country and for the continent." Liberia's president and 2011 Nobel Peace Prize laureate Ellen Johnson-Sirleaf extended her condolences to Ghanaians, saying the news had "come as a surprise. On a personal level his moderation and integrity stood out, playing a strong role at the regional meetings they both attended". Nigeria's President Goodluck Jonathan said of Mills: "he was a great friend of our country and a firm believer in the shared heritage and common destiny of all Africans. President Mills and I shared a vision of peace and political stability as well as regional and continental economic integration in pursuit of progress and development, in our individual countries, within the sub-region and in Africa as a whole". South African President Jacob Zuma paid tribute to President Atta Mills, saying: "South Africa and Ghana enjoy strong relations at both the bilateral and multilateral levels, and under President Mills' leadership, we saw genuine efforts aimed at deepening the historical relations between our two nations."
