= Economic history of Ghana =

Change in per capita GDP of Ghana, 1870–2018. Figures are inflation-adjusted to 2011 International dollars

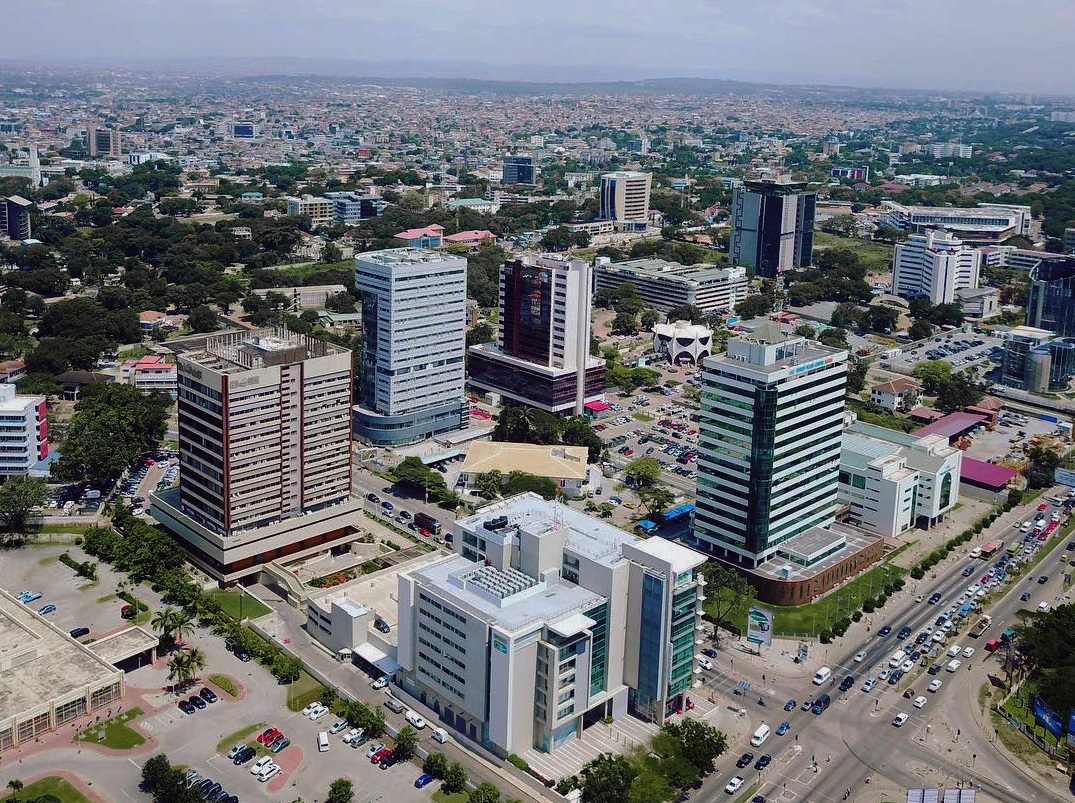
Accra is the capital as well as the economic center of Ghana

The economic history of Ghana details the economic development and the current economic situation of Ghana since pre-colonial times to date.

== Pre-colonial Ghana ==
According to economic historian Stephen Hymer, land was relatively equally distributed in Ghana prior to British colonization.

== Colonial Ghana ==
Endowed with gold and oil palms and situated between the trans-Saharan trade routes and the African coastline visited by successive European traders, the area known today as Ghana has been involved in all phases of Africa's economic development during the last thousand years. As the economic fortunes of African societies have waxed and waned, so, too, have Ghana's, leaving that country in the early 1990s in a state of arrested development, unable to make the "leap" to Africa's next, as yet uncertain, phase of economic evolution.

As early as the thirteenth century, present-day Ghana was drawn into long-distance trade, in large part because of its gold reserves. The trans-Saharan trade, one of the most wide-ranging trading networks of pre-modern times, involved an exchange of European, North African, and Saharan commodities for the products of the African savannas and forests, including gold, kola nuts, and slaves. Present-day Ghana, named the Gold Coast by European traders, was an important source of the gold traded across the Sahara. Centralized states such as Asante controlled prices by regulating production and marketing of this precious commodity. As European navigational techniques improved in the fifteenth century, Portuguese and later Dutch and English traders tried to circumvent the Saharan trade by sailing directly to its southernmost source on the West African coast. In 1482 the Portuguese built a fortified trading post at Elmina and began purchasing gold, ivory, and pepper from African coastal merchants.

Although Africans for centuries had exported their raw materials (ivory, gold, kola nuts) in exchange for imports ranging from salt to foreign metals, the introduction of the Atlantic slave trade in the early sixteenth century changed the nature of African export production in fundamental ways. An increasing number of Ghanaians sought to enrich themselves by capturing fellow Africans in warfare and selling them to slave dealers from North America and South America. The slaves were transported to the coast and sold through African merchants, using the same routes and connections through which gold and ivory had formerly flowed. In return, Africans often received guns as payment, which could be used to capture more slaves and, more importantly, to gain and preserve political power.

An estimated ten million Africans, at least half a million from the Gold Coast, left the continent in this manner. Some economists have argued that the slave trade increased African economic resources and therefore did not necessarily impede development, but others, notably historian Walter Rodney, have argued that by removing the continent's most valuable resource—humans—the slave trade robbed Africa of unknown invention, innovation, and production. Rodney further argues that the slave trade fueled a process of underdevelopment, whereby African societies came to rely on the export of resources crucial to their own economic growth, thereby precluding local development of those resources. Although some scholars maintain that the subsequent economic history of this region supports Rodney's interpretation, no consensus exists on this point. Indeed, in recent years, some historians not only have rejected Rodney's interpretation but also have advanced the notion that it is the Africans themselves rather than an array of external forces that are to blame for the continent's economic plight.

When the slave trade ended in the early years of the nineteenth century, the local economy became the focus of the so-called legitimate trade, which the emerging industrial powers of Europe encouraged as a source of materials and markets to aid their own production and sales. The British, in particular, gained increasing control over the region throughout the nineteenth century and promoted the production of palm oil and timber as well as the continuation of gold production. In return, Africans were inundated with imports of consumer goods that, unlike the luxuries or locally unavailable imports of the trans-Saharan trade, quickly displaced African products, especially textiles.

In 1878 cacao trees were introduced from the Americas. Cocoa quickly became the colony's major export; Ghana produced more than half the global yield by the 1920s. African farmers used kinship networks like business corporations to spread cocoa cultivation throughout large areas of southern Ghana. Legitimate trade restored the overall productivity of Ghana's economy; however, the influx of European goods began to displace indigenous industries, and farmers focused more on cash crops than on essential food crops for local consumption.

== 1957-1995 ==
When Ghana gained its independence from Britain in 1957, the economy appeared stable and prosperous. Ghana was the world's leading producer of cocoa, boasted a well-developed infrastructure to service trade, and enjoyed a relatively advanced education system. At independence, President Kwame Nkrumah sought to use the apparent stability of the Ghanaian economy as a springboard for economic diversification and expansion. He began the process of moving Ghana from a primarily agricultural economy to a mixed agricultural-industrial one. Using cocoa revenues as security, Nkrumah took out loans to establish industries that would produce import substitutes as well as process many of Ghana's exports. Nkrumah's plans were ambitious and grounded in the desire to reduce Ghana's vulnerability to world trade. Unfortunately, the price of cocoa collapsed in the mid-1960s, destroying the fundamental stability of the economy and making it nearly impossible for Nkrumah to continue his plans. Pervasive corruption exacerbated these problems. In 1966 a group of military officers overthrew Nkrumah and inherited a nearly bankrupt country.

Since 1966 Ghana has been caught in a cycle of debt, weak commodity demand, and currency overvaluation, which has resulted in the decay of productive capacities and a crippling foreign debt. Once the price of cocoa fell in the mid-1960s, Ghana obtained less of the foreign currency necessary to repay loans, the value of which jumped almost ten times between 1960 and 1966. Some economists recommended that Ghana devalue its currency, the cedi, to make its cocoa price more attractive on the world market, but devaluation would also have rendered loan repayment in United States dollars much more difficult. Moreover, such a devaluation would have increased the costs of imports, both for consumers and nascent industries.

Until the early 1980s, successive governments refused to devalue the currency (with the exception of the government of Kofi Abrefa Busia, which devalued the cedi in 1971 and was promptly overthrown). Cocoa prices languished, discouraging cocoa production altogether and leading to smuggling of existing cocoa crops to neighboring countries, where francs rather than cedis could be obtained in payment. As production and official exports collapsed, revenue necessary for the survival of the economy was obtained through the procurement of further loans, thereby intensifying a self-destructive cycle driven by debt and reliance on vulnerable world commodity markets.

By the early 1980s, Ghana's economy was in an advanced state of collapse. Per capita gross domestic product (GDP) showed negative growth throughout the 1960s and fell by 3.2 percent per year from 1970 to 1981. Most important was the decline in cocoa production, which fell by half between the mid-1960s and the late 1970s, drastically reducing Ghana's share of the world market from about one-third in the early 1970s to only one-eighth in 1982-83. At the same time, mineral production fell by 32 percent; gold production declined by 47 percent, diamonds by 67 percent, manganese by 43 percent, and bauxite by 46 percent. Inflation averaged more than 50 percent a year between 1976 and 1981, hitting 116.5 percent in 1981. Real minimum wages dropped from an index of 75 in 1975 to one of 15.4 in 1981. Tax revenue fell from 17 percent of GDP in 1973 to only 5 percent in 1983, and actual imports by volume in 1982 were only 43 percent of average 1975-76 levels. Productivity, the standard of living, and the government's resources had plummeted dramatically.

In 1981 a military government under the leadership of Flight Lieutenant Jerry John Rawlings came to power. Calling itself the Provisional National Defence Council (PNDC), the Rawlings regime initially blamed the nation's economic problems on the corruption of previous governments. Rawlings soon discovered, however, that Ghana's problems were the result of forces more complicated than economic abuse. Following a severe drought in 1983, the government accepted stringent International Monetary Fund (IMF) and World Bank loan conditions and instituted the Economic Recovery Program (ERP).

Signaling a dramatic shift in policies, the ERP fundamentally changed the government's social, political, and economic orientation. Aimed primarily at enabling Ghana to repay its foreign debts, the ERP exemplified the structural adjustment policies formulated by international banking and donor institutions in the 1980s. The program emphasized the promotion of the export sector and an enforced fiscal stringency, which together aimed to eradicate budget deficits. The PNDC followed the ERP faithfully and gained the support of the international financial community. The effects of the ERP on the domestic economy, however, led to a lowered standard of living for most Ghanaians.

In the early 1990s, Ghana's economic recovery still appeared uneven and was geared primarily to the export rather than domestic market. GDP had risen by an average of 5 percent per year since 1984, inflation had been reduced to about 20 percent, and export earnings had reached US$1 billion. Most production came from the export sector, and by the 1992-93 crop year, cocoa production surpassed 300,000 tons, placing Ghana third in the world. In 1990 exports of minerals—primarily gold but also diamonds, manganese, and bauxite—brought in US$234 million, an increase of 23.2 percent from the year before. Nevertheless, salaries were low, and because the cost of public services continued to rise, Ghana's poor bore the brunt of the negative effects of the austerity program.

== 1995-present ==
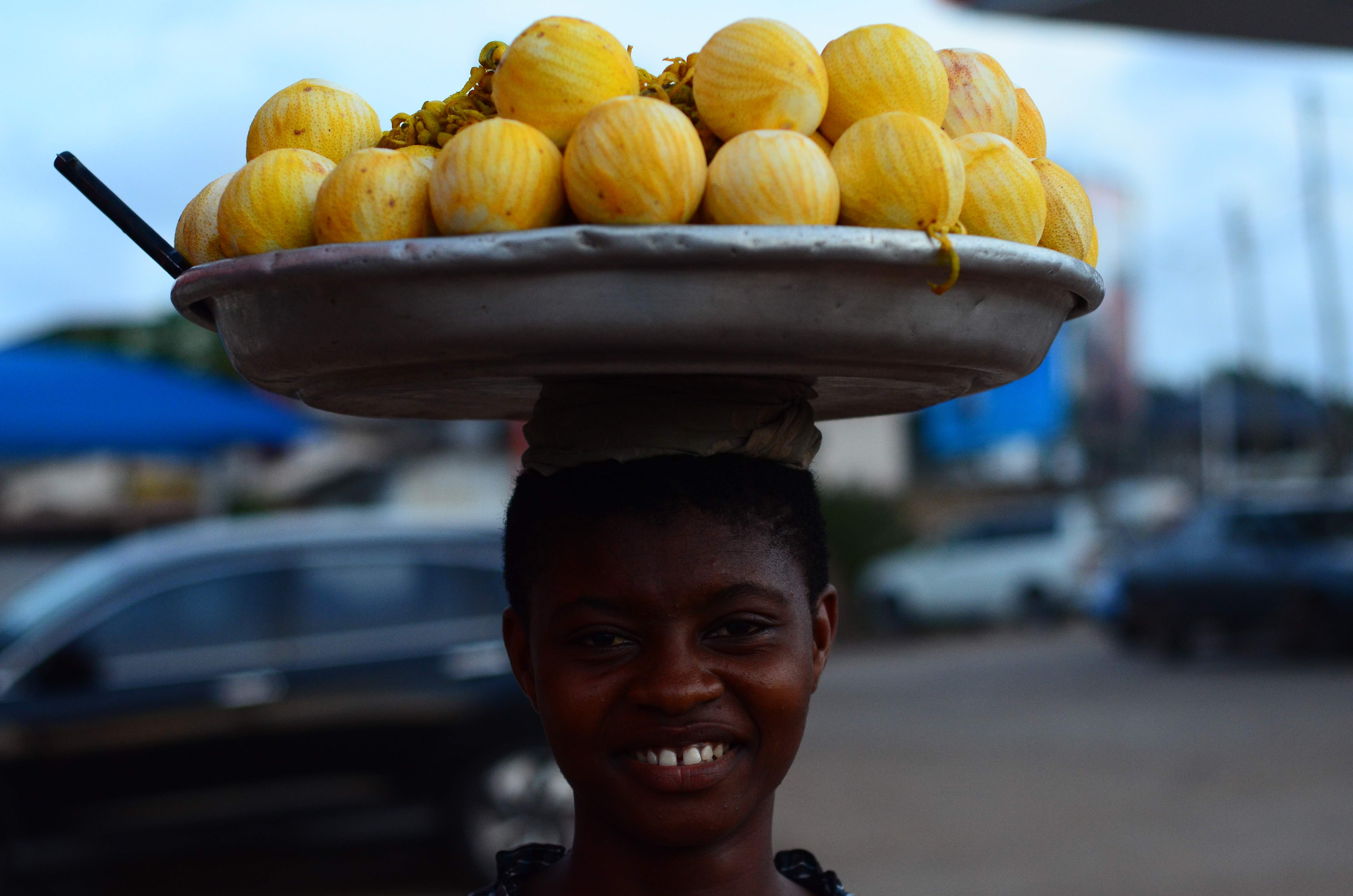
Woman selling oranges in Ghana, 2018

Oil was discovered in commercial quantities under the Presidency of John Kufuor. His successor, John Atta Mills initiated Ghana's first ever foray into oil production. In 2010, the government rebased the economic statistics of the country resulting in an upward push of the GDP of Ghana by more than 60%. The base year for calculations was also changed from 1993 to 2006. The rebase moved Ghana into middle income status and it placed the country as the third largest in the ranking of GDP per person in West Africa behind Cape Verde and Nigeria. After the changes in statistics, the service sector became the largest sector of Ghana's economy with a share of 51%. Agriculture, which was initially the dominant sector, accounted for 30.2% after the economic rebasing whiles the industrial sector lagged behind with a share of 18.6%. Ghana became the fastest growing nation in the world in 2011 and once more in 2019. Ghana’s rapid growth (7 percent per year in 2017-19) was halted by the consequences of COVID-19 pandemic, especially the March 2020 Ghana’s lockdown.

== See also ==
- Economy of Ghana
