= Forestry in Ghana =

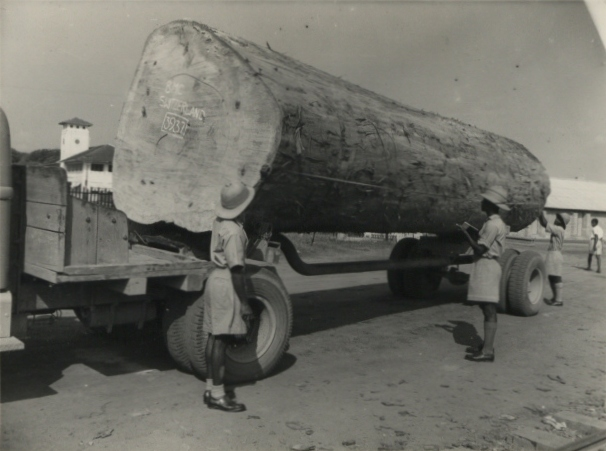
Sawn Timber being loaded into lighters from Timber Sheds at Takoradi Harbour in Ghana in the 20th century.

Forests cover about one-third of Ghana's total area, with commercial forestry concentrated in the southern parts of Ghana.

== Overview ==
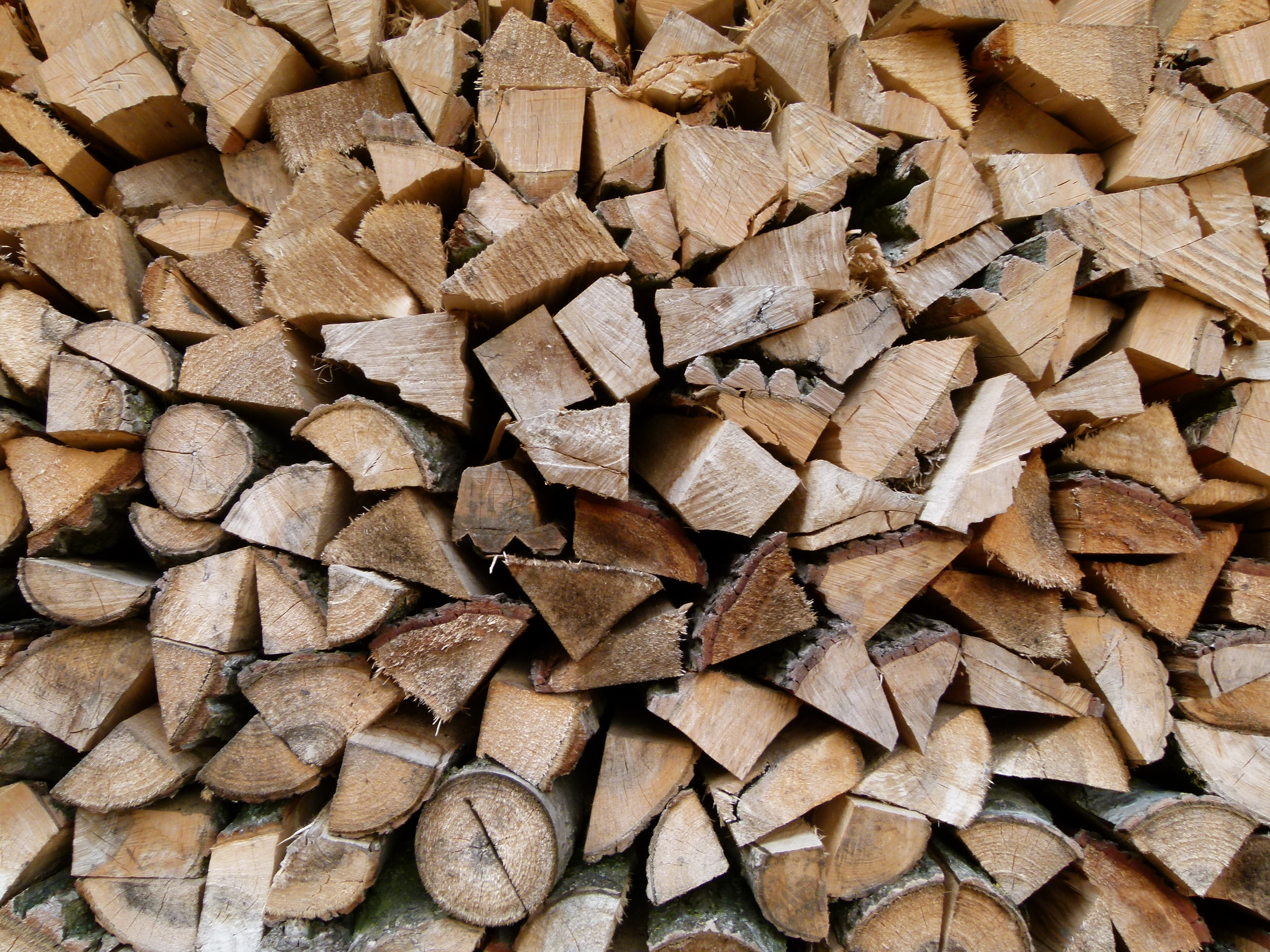
Processed timber

There were about 220 lumber processors in Ghana at the beginning of the 1990s, but the sector was subjected to a number of limitations. Kiln-dried goods were in high demand abroad. Ghanaian producers couldn't keep up with demand due to a lack of kilns. Because air-dried wood tends to become unstable over time, the inexpensive air-dried processing method was not satisfactory. Incentives for foreign investment were less alluring in this industry than they were in others, like mining as compared to other mining and cocoa production regions. The lumber processing infrastructure in the Western Region,has been relatively neglected. Lack of managerial and technological expertise are among the other challenges.

Scandals have been reported in Ghana's forestry industry since 1986, and they erupted again in early 1992. The most notable case involved African Timber and Plywood, once Ghana's largest exporter of round logs. In the mid-1980s, the government embarked on a US$36 million rehabilitation project to boost the company's production. In 1992 as much as US$2.3 million was alleged to have been siphoned off from the project through various malpractices, and a number of officials were arrested. Furthermore, the environmental group, Friends of the Earth, alleged that there had been additional thefts by foreign companies totaling almost US$50 million in hard currency during the 1980s. In 1992 the government began investigating the activities of hundreds of companies, both foreign and local, that were alleged to have entered into a range of illegal dealings including smuggling, fraudulent invoicing, violation of local currency regulations, corruption, bribery, and nonpayment of royalties. The corruption is so widespread, however, that it remains to be seen on whether the Ghanaian authorities will stop timber-related crimes anytime soon.

== History ==
The forestry sector of Ghana accounted for 4.2 percent of GDP in 1990; timber was the country's third largest foreign exchange earner. Since 1983 forestry has benefited from more than US$120 million in investments and has undergone substantial changes, resulting in doubled earnings between 1985 and 1990. In 1993 timber and wood products earnings totaled US$140 million against a targeted level of US$130 million. Between January and November 1994, exports amounted to 919,000 tons and earned US$212 million.

Until the 1980s, forestry production suffered because of the overvalued cedi and deterioration of the transportation infrastructure. Log production declined by 66 percent during 1970- 81 and sawed timber by 47 percent. Exports fell from US$130 million in 1973 to US$15 million in 1983, and four nationalized firms went bankrupt during that period. The forestry sector was given a large boost in 1986, with a US$24 million timber rehabilitation credit, which financed imports of logging equipment. As a consequence, log production rose 65 percent in 1984–87, and export revenues rose 665 percent in 1983–88. Furthermore, the old Ghana Timber Marketing Board was disbanded and replaced by two bodies, the Timber Export Development Board—responsible for marketing and pricing, and the Forest Products Inspection Bureau—responsible for monitoring contracts, maintaining quality standards, grading products, and acting as a watchdog for illegal transactions. Some of the external financing underwrote these institutional changes, while much of the rest financed forestry management and research as well as equipment for logging, saw milling, and manufacturing.

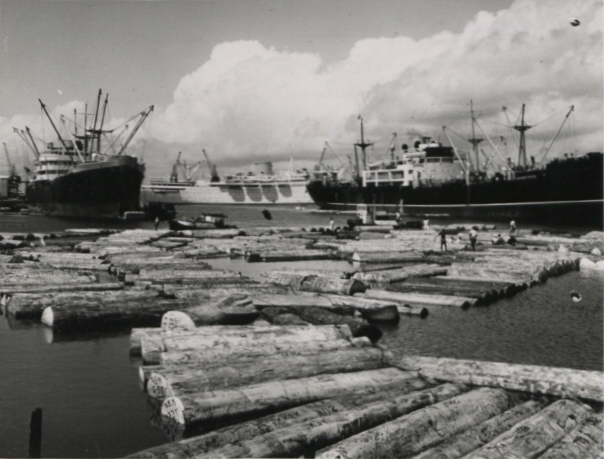
Timber logs and Timber rafting at Takoradi Harbour in Ghana in the 20th century.

The sector, however, faced several problems. The most important was severe deforestation. A century ago, Ghana's tropical hardwood forest extended from about the middle of the country southward to the sea. Moreover, nearly half the country was covered with forests, which included 680 species of trees and several varieties of mahoganies. Most of this wood has been cut. By the early 1990s, only about one-third of the country was still forested, and not all of this was of commercial value. This situation has forced the government to make difficult choices between desperately needed hard currency earnings and conservation. The Forest Resource Management Project, part of the economic recovery program (ERP), was initiated in 1988, and in 1989 the government banned log exports of eighteen species. The government later extended the list and imposed high duties on other species, planning to phase out log and air-dried timber exports altogether by 1994.

Instead, the government hoped to increase sales of wood products to replace earnings from logs. Government figures showed that one cubic meter of lumber and plywood was worth more than twice as much as the same amount of logs; veneers earned five times as much; and other products, such as furniture and floorings, earned six times the price of an equivalent volume of logs. Improvements in the processing sector caused wood products (excluding lumber) to rise to about 20 percent of export earnings in 1991, accounting for 6.9 percent of volume exports. By comparison, wood products represented 11 percent of earnings and 5.5 percent of volume in 1985. The fall in the proportion of volume sales accounted for by logs was accompanied by a dramatic fall in their share in earnings, from 50 to 60 percent in the mid-1980s to 23 percent in 1990.

=== Colonial era ===
Giving a back track of Ghana's forestry, the early colonial period (1847–1926) was a period where there was a successful opposition to colonial masters taking control over Ghana's forest resources, which collapsed all efforts of scientific forestry. It was the idea of the then British colonial masters at that time to seize all forest resources and “waste" land and vest it in the Crown with the aim of giving grants to European investors in areas of plantation, mining and forestry through the Crown lands bill which was abolished by a strong protest of natives of the then Gold Coast (Wardell, 2006). A forestry department was established in 1909 with the main objective of touring forests, improving knowledge of flora and setting up sites for reservation in then Gold Coast with a staff of two alongside a Forest bill passed in 1911 by the legislative council (Thompson, 1910). Thus, timber harvest in the colonial period was modest compared to what was projected by Munro et al. (2001), who projected high timber harvest in Sierra Leone, with the first logs of Khaya senegalis been exported to the U.K in 1833 (Parren et al.1995). Fast forward to the forest reservation period (1927–1945), there was resistance by chiefs to set forest reservation by laws even though the Governor of that period gave an ultimatum in March 1924 where if they should fail, a new forest ordinance would be set up (Logan,1947). With time, a new bill was proposed in 1926 and passed in 1927 (The Forest Ordinance cap,127) which gave the colonial government the authority to reserve forests in the Gold Coast as a result of the chief's resistance to set up by-laws voluntarily. After World War II, Europeans needed wood to reconstruct their cities. This resulted in a high export rate of timber between the period 1946–1956, where the mahogany specie dominated the harvested export but dropped rapidly in 1957 as it started to become rear (Hall and Swaine 1981; Foggie and Piasecki 1962). From 1947 onwards, initiatives were set up to nurture highly valuable tree species in the forest reserve using a system termed the Tropical Shelterwood System (TSS). This procedure involved the cutting of climbers, shrubs and unwanted plant species a few years before exploitation to ensure a higher canopy system in the forest reserve with desired seedlings set up annually in the previously cleaned area to enable the seedlings flourish. This initiative, “The TSS” was not applied on a larger scale in Ghana as a result of the project being too expensive and difficult to administer with an average cost of £10-£12 per ha (Foggie,1957; Parren and de Graaf, 1995; Asabere 1987).

=== Post-Colonial era ===
During the period of 1957-1970 where Ghana, then Gold Coast gained independence under the new government of Dr. Kwame Nkrumah, the timber boom continued mainly for the purpose of export. With time, desired species located on the off-forest reserves became rear which resulted in timber contractors channeling their focus on the main forest reserves. The gradual disappearance of desired species resulted in the accreditation of lesser-known species such as Pericopsis elata commonly known as “Kokrodua" which later on became one of the most preferred species used in the making of luxurious furniture until it became extinct in the 1900s, slowly caused the expansion of the desired species list (Oteng-Amoako, 2006). The Ghana Selection System (GSS), which was cheaper simple and standardized was set up following the disappointing outcome of TSS (Foggie, 1957). It was a project which involved selective exploitations and improvement thinning (Baidoe, 1970). Bringing the account of Ghana's forestry history from 1992 to date, there were many laws and policies that were set up. The off-forest reserve interim measures were introduced to give specific measures to obtain consent from a farmer before harvesting timber by concessionaires in farmland (Kotey et al., 1998). For forest areas, 55% was considered outside the production circle, where the small-grained protection was prescribed which encompassed a specific number of trees to be logged per ha, depending on ecological zone (Wong, 1995). Gradual development brought about new forestry institutions, laws and policies. The Forest and Wildlife Policy (FWP) which was adopted with the aim of securing the forest estate and secure a perpetual supply of timber in 1994. Manuals and procedures related to forestry such as the Annual Allowable Cut (AAC) of 1.0 cubic meters which was endorsed made the national regulatory level in 1996 (Planning branch, 1999). Currently, despite the scientific management-based regime documented on paper, the practical implementation of it remains challenged in the sense that, chainsaw operators harvest exceeds that of the formal sector and tendency in stock surveys to inflate the number of trees to be harvested through the overestimation of tree diameters. With the name change from Gold Coast to Ghana post-independence, two main forest vegetation types were classified; the Tropical High Forest (which includes the evergreen rainforests) accounting for 8milllion ha and the Savanna which also accounted for 14.7 million ha of the land area (Hall and Swaine, 1981).

With an equatorial climate, Ghana became notable as endowed with a wide range of natural resources in its forest vegetation areas. In particular, such natural resources as gold, diamond and highly valued tree species namely Khaya senegalis which possess monetary value; worth a good price and having desirable or esteemed characteristics or qualities and of great use or service (FAO, 1991) in the forest zones of Ghana was estimated. Forests are extremely significant in people's lives, national and local economy as well as maintaining environmental quality. By so doing, forest policies and legislation were enacted and these have had an impact on national development, sustainable livelihoods and poverty reduction (Kotey et al., 1998). The forest zone in Ghana could be classified into Evergreen Rainforest, Evergreen Moist Forest and Moist Semi-deciduous Forest. These rich forest classifications or high forest zones could be located specifically in rural areas found at the Southern part of the country where timber is harvested from two distinct land-use types. These land use types include the on-forest reserve areas and off forest reserve areas (areas outside forest reserves). These two land use types are designated to be retained as high forest for sustainability, management for timber production and biodiversity conservation (FAO, 2005). Ghana's forests are potentially essential to the nation economically, ecologically and socio-culturally. Due to this reason, all-natural resources are taken care of by the President of the nation, through which the forestry commission (re-established 1999) was set up as a subdivision of the Ministry of Lands Natural resources to sustain development and management of Ghana's forests and wildlife.

== Tree cover extent and loss ==
Global Forest Watch publishes annual estimates of tree cover loss and 2000 tree cover extent derived from time-series analysis of Landsat satellite imagery in the Global Forest Change dataset. In this framework, tree cover refers to vegetation taller than 5 m (including natural forests and tree plantations), and tree cover loss is defined as the complete removal of tree cover canopy for a given year, regardless of cause.

For Ghana, country statistics report cumulative tree cover loss of 1,752,041 ha (17,520.41 km^{2}) from 2001 to 2024 (about 25.1% of its 2000 tree cover area). For tree cover density greater than 30%, country statistics report a 2000 tree cover extent of 6,968,887 ha (69,688.87 km^{2}). The charts and table below display this data. In simple terms, the annual loss number is the area where tree cover disappeared in that year, and the extent number shows what remains of the 2000 tree cover baseline after subtracting cumulative loss. Forest regrowth is not included in the dataset.

Annual tree cover loss in Ghana, 2001–2024. View chart definition.
Tree cover extent in 2000 minus cumulative tree cover loss in Ghana, 2001–2024 (loss-only residual; does not account for gain). View chart definition.

Annual tree cover extent and loss
Year	Tree cover extent (km2) (Note: This residual measure does not include forest regrowth.)	Annual tree cover loss (km2)
2001	69,252.11	436.76
2002	68,468.18	783.93
2003	68,218.72	249.46
2004	68,042.44	176.28
2005	67,629.05	413.39
2006	67,357.62	271.43
2007	66,955.78	401.84
2008	66,577.52	378.26
2009	66,194.96	382.56
2010	66,000.20	194.76
2011	65,638.18	362.02
2012	65,271.88	366.30
2013	64,459.85	812.03
2014	63,257.78	1,202.07
2015	62,683.87	573.91
2016	61,491.44	1,192.43
2017	60,338.12	1,153.32
2018	58,822.81	1,515.31
2019	57,940.16	882.65
2020	56,574.02	1,366.14
2021	55,559.89	1,014.13
2022	54,373.45	1,186.44
2023	53,247.64	1,125.81
2024	52,168.46	1,079.18

== REDD+ reference levels and monitoring ==
Under the UNFCCC REDD+ framework, Ghana has submitted national reference-level benchmarks. On the UNFCCC REDD+ Web Platform, both the 2017 and 2021 submission packages are listed as having assessed reference levels, and both packages list a national strategy, safeguards information, and a reported national forest monitoring system.

The first assessed submission, technically assessed in 2018, was a national forest reference level (FRL) covering "reducing emissions from deforestation", "reducing emissions from forest degradation", and enhancement of forest carbon stocks. Using a 2001-2015 reference period and a simple historical average approach for 2016–2025, the assessed FRL was 60,670,197 t CO2 eq per year. The technical assessment states that the benchmark included above-ground biomass, below-ground biomass, deadwood, litter, soil organic carbon, and harvested wood products depending on the activity, and included CO2, CH_{4} and N_{2}O, with non-CO2 gases estimated for forest fires.

An updated national forest reference emission level and forest reference level was submitted in 2021 and technically assessed in 2023. Covering the same three REDD+ activities and the same 2001-2015 reference period, the assessed benchmark was 19,659,303 t CO2 eq per year after revision during the assessment process. The technical assessment states that the modified submission expanded activity data, incorporated national data on wood removals and fuelwood, and added the soil organic carbon pool; it also reports that the benchmark included above-ground biomass, below-ground biomass, deadwood, litter and soil organic carbon, excluded harvested wood products, and included CO2 as well as CH_{4} and N_{2}O from biomass burning in forest land.

Both submissions used a forest definition with a minimum canopy cover of 15 percent, minimum height of 5 metres and minimum area of 1 hectare.

== See also ==
- Economy of Ghana
