= Better Ghana Agenda =

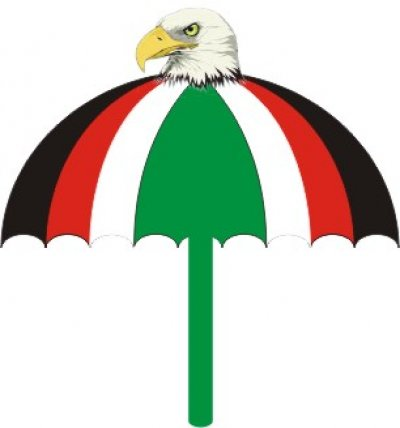
The logo of the National Democratic Congress, Ghana

The term Better Ghana Agenda, is a policy vision, that was used by the former ruling party of Ghana, the National Democratic Congress of Ghana. The term "Better Ghana Agenda" was coined in the year 2007, prior to the 2008 elections, by John Atta Mills, the late President of Ghana because in his view the NPP government had failed to live up to its expectations. They expressed much concern about several shortcomings in the areas of the economy, employment, the environment, health, education, the utilities and many more. Since its inception, there have been huge gains made in all sectors of the Ghanaian economy, notably the attainment of single digit inflation, a fast economic growth rate, solid environmental sustainability portfolios, elimination of schools under trees and expansion of universal healthcare coverage.
