= Manufacturing in Ghana =

Industry in Ghana accounts for about 24.5% of total GDP. However, Ghana's industrial production is rising at a 7.8% rate, giving it the 38th fastest growing industrial production in the world due to government industrialization policies.

Ghana's most important manufacturing industries include electronics manufacturing, car manufacturing, electric car manufacturing, automotive manufacturing, light manufacturing, aluminum smelting, food processing, cement, and small commercial ship building. A relatively small glass-making industry has also developed due to the high-quality sand available from the Tarkwa mining area. The foreign capital has increased in recent years. Most products are for local consumption and exportation.

Other industries include the production of food and beverages, textiles, chemicals and pharmaceuticals, and the processing of metals and wood products.

== History ==
In 1957, after Ghana gained independence, the Nkrumah government launched an industrialization drive that increased manufacturing's share of GDP from 10 percent in 1960 to 14 percent in 1970. This expansion resulted in the creation of a relatively wide range of industrial enterprises, the largest including the Volta Aluminum Company (Valco) smelter, saw mills and timber processing plants, cocoa processing plants, breweries, cement manufacturing, oil refining, textile manufacturing operations, and vehicle assembly plants. Many of these enterprises, however, survived only through protection. The overvalued cedi, shortages of hard-currency for raw materials and spare parts, and poor management in the state sector led to stagnation from 1970 to 1977 and then to a decline from 1977 to 1982.

Thereafter, the manufacturing sector never fully recovered, and performance remained weak into the 1990s. Underutilization of industrial capacity, which had been endemic since the 1960s, increased alarmingly in the 1970s, with average capacity utilization in large- and medium-scale factories falling to 21 percent in 1982. Once the ERP began, the supply of foreign exchange for imported machinery and fuel substantially improved, and capacity utilization climbed steadily to about 40 percent in 1989. Nevertheless, by 1987 production from the manufacturing sector was 35 percent lower than in 1975 and 26 percent lower than in 1980.

Ghana's record with industrialization projects since independence is exemplified by its experience with aluminum, the country's most conspicuous effort to promote capital-intensive industry. This venture began in the mid-1960s with the construction of a 1,186-megawatt hydroelectric dam on the lower Volta River at Akosombo. The Akosombo Dam was the centerpiece of the Volta River Project (VRP), which the Nkrumah government envisioned as the key to developing an integrated aluminum industry based on the exploitation of Ghana's vast bauxite reserves and its hydroelectric potential. Valco became the principal consumer of VRP hydroelectricity, using 60 percent of VRP-generated power and producing up to 200,000 tons of aluminum annually during the 1970s.

Changing global economic conditions and severe drought dramatically affected the Ghanaian aluminum industry during the 1980s. The discovery of vast bauxite reserves in Australia and Brazil created a global oversupply of the mineral and induced a prolonged recession in the aluminum trade. Under these conditions, Valco found it far more economical to import semi-processed alumina from Jamaica and South Korea than to rely on local supplies, despite the discovery in the early 1970s of sizable new deposits at Kibi. Valco's refusal to build an aluminum production facility brought Kaiser and Reynolds into bitter conflict with the government.

Severe drought compounded the effects of unfavorable market conditions by reducing the electricity generating capacity of the Akosombo Dam and by forcing a temporary shutdown of the smelter from 1983 to 1985. Aluminum production was slow to recover in the wake of the shutdown. In the early 1990s, aluminum production and exports continued to be negligible.

Drastic currency devaluation after 1983 made it exceptionally expensive to purchase inputs, which hurt businessmen in the manufacturing sector. Furthermore, the ERP's tight monetary policies created liquidity crises for manufacturers, while liberalization of trade meant that some enterprises could not compete with cheaper imports. These policies hurt industries beset by long recession, hyperinflation, outmoded equipment, weak demand, and requirements that they pay 100 percent advances for their own inputs. Local press reports have estimated the closure of at least 120 factories since 1988, mainly because of competitive imports. The garment, leather, electrical, electronics, and pharmaceuticals sectors had been particularly hard hit. In 1990, even the New Match Company, the only safety match company in the country, closed.

ERP strategies made it difficult for the government to assist local enterprises. Committed to privatization and the rule of free market forces, the government was constrained from offering direct assistance or even from moderating some policies that had a detrimental impact on local manufacturers. Nevertheless, the Rawlings government initiated programs to promote local manufacturing.

In 1986, the government established the Ghana Investment Center to assist in creating new enterprises. Between 1986 and 1990, the vast majority of projects approved—444 of 621—were in the manufacturing sector. Projected investment for the approved ventures was estimated at US$138 million in 1989 and at US$136 million in 1990. In the initial phase, timber was the leading sector, giving way in 1990 to chemicals. In 1991 the government established an office to deal with industrial distress in response to complaints that "unrestrained imports" of foreign products were undermining local enterprises. The 1992 budget included assistance for local industrialists; ¢2 billion was set aside as financial support for "deserving enterprises."

The dominant trends in manufacturing, nonetheless, were the involvement of foreign capital and the initiation of joint ventures. Significant new enterprises included a US$8 million Taiwanese-owned factory, capable of turning out ten tons of iron and steel products per hour, which began trials at Tema in 1989. Although approximately 500 projects had been approved since the investment code came into force in 1985, almost half had still not been launched by the end of 1989. Between 90 and 95 percent of the approved projects were joint ventures between foreign and local partners, 80 percent of which were in the wood industry. Restructuring of the sector was proceeding through divestiture, import liberalization, and promotion of small-scale industries.

In June 2021, Ghanaian businessman Ibrahim Mahama's company Dzata Cement started commercial production after the completion of phase one of the Dzata Cement plant. The company is the first wholly Ghanaian owned cement company. The first phase of the company was projected to make an annual production of 1.2 million tonnes. The plant is projected to make an annual production of 3 million tonnes after the two phases of the project is complete.

== Ghana textile manufacturers ==
As of 2012 there were four major companies in this sector. Akosombo Textiles Limited (ATL), Tex Style Ghana Limited (GTP), Printex Ghana and Ghana Textile Manufacturing Company (GTMC).

== Automobile manufacturing ==
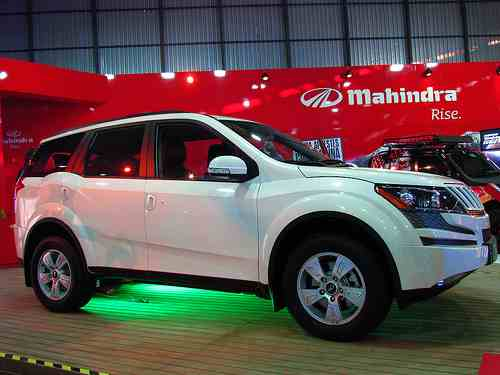
Mahindra XUV500 is manufactured and exported from Ghana along with the urban electric car the Mahindra e2o, the Mahindra Genio and the Mahindra Xylo.

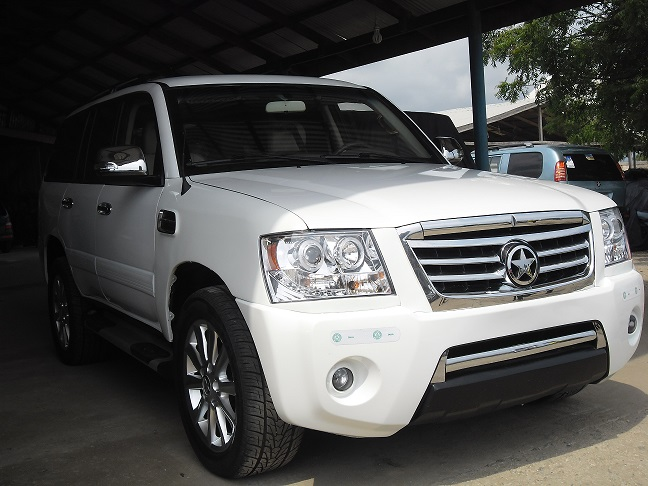
Kantanka Otumfo SUV made by Apostle Kwadwo Safo of Kantanka Automobiles in Ghana

Ghana began its automotive industry car manufacturing with the construction of its first self assembled automobile from Ghanaian automotive company "Suame Industrial Development Organization" (SMIDO) first constructed prototype robust sport utility vehicle (SUV), named the SMATI Turtle 1, intended for use in the rough African terrain and designed and manufactured by "Artisans of Suame Magazine Industrial Development Organization" (SMIDO) and the construction of Ghanaian urban electric cars from 2014, and Indian automotive major Mahindra & Mahindra Limited and Mahindra & Mahindra Ghana Limited has set up assembly plants across South Ghana to service western Africa and the Africa continent and set up of service centres on a 3.8-hectare (9.5-acre) plot in the Greater Accra region capital Accra along with its Ghanaian partner Mahindra & Mahindra Ghana Limited.

Mahindra vehicles are sold to state institutions, private organizations, industries, United Nations agencies and individuals in Ghana, on the Africa continent and around the world. Mahindra & Mahindra Ghana Limited automobiles to be manufactured in Ghana and exported from Ghana include the latest generation of Mahindra & Mahindra Limited vehicles - the Mahindra XUV500, the urban electric car the Mahindra e2o, the Mahindra Genio and the Mahindra Xylo. As part of Mahindra's efforts to make it easy for more people on the Africa continent to afford vehicles, the company has joined with Ghana-headquartered financial institution Fidelity Bank Ghana to provide financial assistance to customers through hire-purchase and lease schemes.

Mahindra Group is a GH₵34.9 billion (US$16.2 billion) multinational conglomerate and operates in the key industries that drive economic growth such as a strong presence in the agribusiness, aerospace, component-based software engineering, information technology consulting services, defence, electricity generation, financial services, industrial equipment, logistics, real estate, retail, steel, commercial vehicles, two-wheeler motorcycles and dicycles industries. In 2012, Mahindra featured in the Forbes Global 2000, a listing of the biggest and most powerful companies in the world. In 2013, the Mahindra Group received the Financial Times Boldness in Business Award in the Emerging Markets category.

The Apostle Safo Suaye Technology Research Centre (ASSTRC), headed by Dr. Kwadwo Safo, is currently manufacturing 2 vehicles per year. Yet, by 2015, if things work as planned, Kwadwo Safo and his team should be able to manufacture about 500 cars per year. This will be made possible thanks to the construction of a new automobile assembly plant that will manufacture the various brands of Kantanka vehicles. The Apostle Safo Suaye Technology Research Centre (ASSTRC), confirmed that the local automobile assembly plant, will be ready in May, 2014. When completed, the project, which is an initiative of Ghanaian industrialist, Apostle Dr Kwadwo Safo, would see the production of between 120 and 240 cars daily. As of 2015 Kantanka vehicles are assembled upon order in small numbers from imported Chinese parts.

== See also ==
- Economy of Ghana
