= Economy of Ghana =

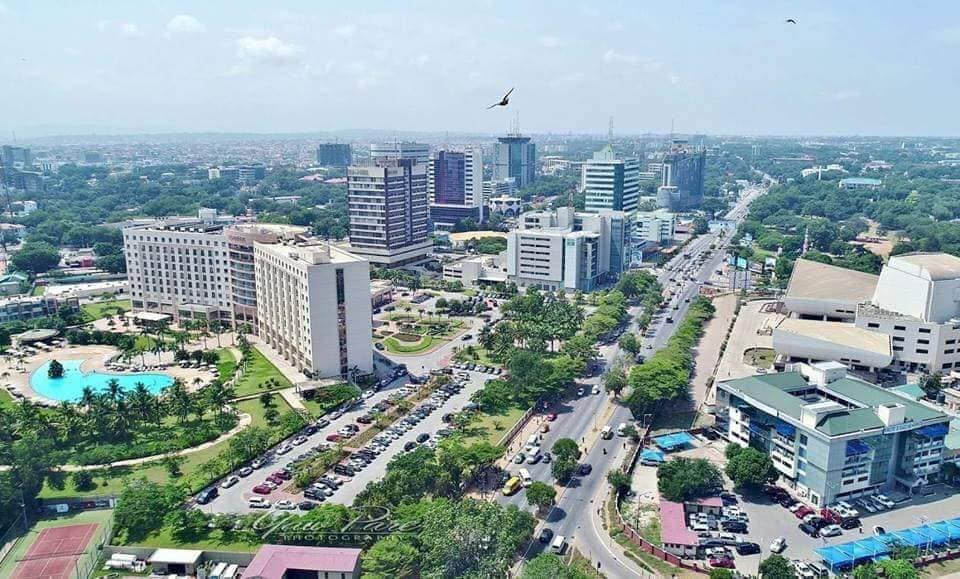
- Accra, the financial capital of Ghana
- Currency: Cedi (GHS, GH₵)
- Fiscal year: Calendar year
- Trade organisations: AU, AfCFTA, WTO, ECOWAS
- Country group: Developing economy; Lower-middle income economy

Statistics
- Population: ▲34,378,768 (2026)
- GDP: ▲$111.96 billion (nominal; 2025); ▲$294.9 billion (PPP; 2025)
- GDP rank: 79th (nominal; 2025); 68th (PPP; 2025)
- GDP growth: 4.0% (2025)
- GDP per capita: ▲$3,190 (nominal; 2025); ▲$8,410 (PPP; 2025)
- GDP per capita rank: 143rd (nominal; 2025); 130th (PPP; 2025)
- GDP per capita growth: 3.6% (2024)
- GDP by sector: agriculture: 22.8%; industry: 31.3%; services: 45.9%; (2025 est.)
- Inflation (CPI): ▼3.7% (May 2026)
- Population below national poverty line: 21.9% in multidimensional poverty (Q3 2025); 30.5% on less than $3.20/day (2016)
- Gini coefficient: 43.5 medium (2016)
- Human Development Index: ▲0.628 medium (2023) (143rd); 0.458 low IHDI (2022)
- Labour force: ▲13,927,871 (2024 est.); 69% employment rate (2021)
- Labour force by occupation: agriculture: 36.8%; industry: 16.3%; services: 46.9%; (2023 est.)
- Unemployment: 3.1% (2024 est.)
- Main industries: mining, petroleum extraction, cocoa processing, agribusiness, cement production, manufacturing, telecommunications, financial services, aluminum processing, construction materials, renewable energy development, digital technology services

External
- Exports: ▲$16.7 billion (2023 est.)
- Export goods: gold, crude petroleum, cocoa beans, cocoa paste, manganese ore, refined petroleum products, cashew nuts, aluminum products, processed agricultural commodities
- Main export partners: Switzerland 18.2%; South Africa 11.7%; United Arab Emirates 10.1%; China 8.2%; India 7.0%; United States 4.7%; Netherlands 3.9%; Italy 3.7%; (2023 est.)
- Imports: ▲$17.15 billion (2024 est.)
- Import goods: refined petroleum products, industrial machinery, motor vehicles, rice and cereals, pharmaceuticals, electrical equipment, construction materials
- Main import partners: China 22.4%; United Arab Emirates 11.6%; India 8.9%; United States 5.3%; United Kingdom 4.8%; Netherlands 4.1%; Belgium 3.6%; South Africa 3.1%; (2024 est.)
- FDI stock: ▲$52.3 billion (2025 est.); ▲ Abroad: $3.8 billion (2025 est.)
- Current account: ▲$3.10 billion (Q1 2026)
- Gross external debt: ▲$29.1 billion (January 2026)

Public finance
- Foreign reserves: ▲$11.1 billion (January 2026)
- Budget balance: −3.0% of GDP (2025 est.)
- Revenue: $24.6 billion (2026 est.)
- Spending: 23.3% of GDP (2024 est.)
- Credit rating: Standard & Poor's; CCC+ (Stable Outlook); Fitch; B (Positive Outlook); Moody's; Caa1 (Positive Outlook)
- All values, unless otherwise stated, are in US dollars.

Ghana has a developing mixed economy. Based on International Monetary Fund estimates, it is the 73rd-largest economy in the world and the 10th-largest economy in Africa by nominal gross domestic product. By purchasing power parity, it ranks 67th globally and 9th in Africa.

Ghana's economy is led by the services sector, followed by industry and agriculture. Recent economic growth has been supported by services, a recovery in agriculture, strong gold exports, and improved macroeconomic conditions. Although agriculture accounts for a smaller share of output than services or industry, it remains an important source of employment, while services account for the largest share of total employment.

Ghana undertook a currency redenomination in July 2007, replacing the old cedi with the Ghana cedi at a rate of 10,000 old cedis to one Ghana cedi.

Ghana is one of Africa's largest commodity exporters. It is Africa's leading gold producer and also produces cocoa, manganese ore, bauxite, diamonds, and crude petroleum. Strong gold exports contributed to a current account surplus, higher foreign-exchange reserves, and an appreciation of the cedi in 2025.

The country has also faced repeated fiscal and external-sector pressures. In April 2015, the International Monetary Fund approved a three-year Extended Credit Facility arrangement of about US$918 million to support Ghana's economic reform programme. Ghana entered another period of debt distress in the early 2020s, leading to debt restructuring and a new IMF-supported programme aimed at restoring macroeconomic stability.

== Taxation ==
Taxation in Ghana is administered by the Ghana Revenue Authority (GRA). The tax system includes value-added tax (VAT), personal income tax, corporate income tax, capital gains tax, withholding taxes, excise duties, customs duties, and rent income tax.

Ghana introduced VAT in 1998. Under the current VAT system, the standard VAT rate is 15%, applied alongside the 2.5% National Health Insurance Levy (NHIL) and the 2.5% Ghana Education Trust Fund (GETFund) Levy, giving a combined effective VAT and levy rate of 20% on VAT-able goods and services. The COVID-19 Health Recovery Levy has been abolished.

The general corporate income tax rate in Ghana is 25%, although different rates apply to some sectors and business categories. Personal income tax is progressive, with rates for resident individuals rising to a top marginal rate of 35%. Capital gains tax is also levied, with gains realized by individuals generally taxed at 15% of net gains.

Rent income is taxable in Ghana. The GRA applies an 8% rate on residential premises and a 15% rate on commercial and non-residential premises.

Ghana has sought to strengthen domestic revenue mobilisation as part of its fiscal consolidation efforts. The Ministry of Finance reported that tax collections in 2024 totalled GH₵153.6 billion, exceeding the 2024 budget target of GH₵143.0 billion. The International Monetary Fund has identified revenue mobilisation as a central part of Ghana's fiscal adjustment programme, with the authorities aiming to raise the government revenue-to-GDP ratio to over 18% from 15.7% in 2022.

== Development planning and industrialization ==
Ghana has used a series of long-term and medium-term development plans to guide economic transformation, industrialization, poverty reduction, and infrastructure development. One of the earliest post-1992 frameworks was Ghana: Vision 2020, launched in the mid-1990s as a long-term plan to accelerate economic growth, reduce poverty, expand social services, and move Ghana toward middle-income status.

The Vision 2020 framework was not fully implemented as originally designed. According to the National Development Planning Commission, the first medium-term plan under Vision 2020, known as the First Step, expired in 2000, while the subsequent steps were not operationalised. Ghana's development planning later shifted to poverty-reduction and growth frameworks, including the Ghana Poverty Reduction Strategy, the Growth and Poverty Reduction Strategy, the Ghana Shared Growth and Development Agenda, and the Agenda for Jobs policy frameworks.

Industrialization has remained a central goal of Ghana's development strategy. Recent policy efforts have focused on increasing domestic value addition, reducing dependence on raw commodity exports, expanding manufacturing, promoting import substitution, and improving Ghana's role as a regional hub for goods and services. The Ghana CARES “Obaatanpa” programme, launched after the COVID-19 pandemic, described its medium-term transformation goals as including competitive import substitution, export promotion, economic diversification, and the leveraging of digitization.

The One District One Factory initiative, introduced in 2017, is one of Ghana's industrialization programmes. It was designed to support manufacturing and value addition by encouraging the establishment of factories across districts, using local raw materials where possible and shifting the economy away from dependence on raw material exports and imported finished goods. Other industrial-policy priorities have included industrial parks, small and medium-sized enterprises, export development, strategic anchor industries, agro-processing, automotive assembly, and light manufacturing.

Ghana's current long-term national planning framework is Vision 2057, prepared by the National Development Planning Commission. The framework is intended to guide successive medium-term development plans and annual action plans up to 2057, when Ghana will mark 100 years of independence. Its focus areas include macroeconomic stability, human capital development, science and technology, sustainable infrastructure, clean energy transition, and economic transformation.

== Data ==
Change in per capita GDP of Ghana, 1870–2018. Figures are inflation-adjusted to 2011 International dollars

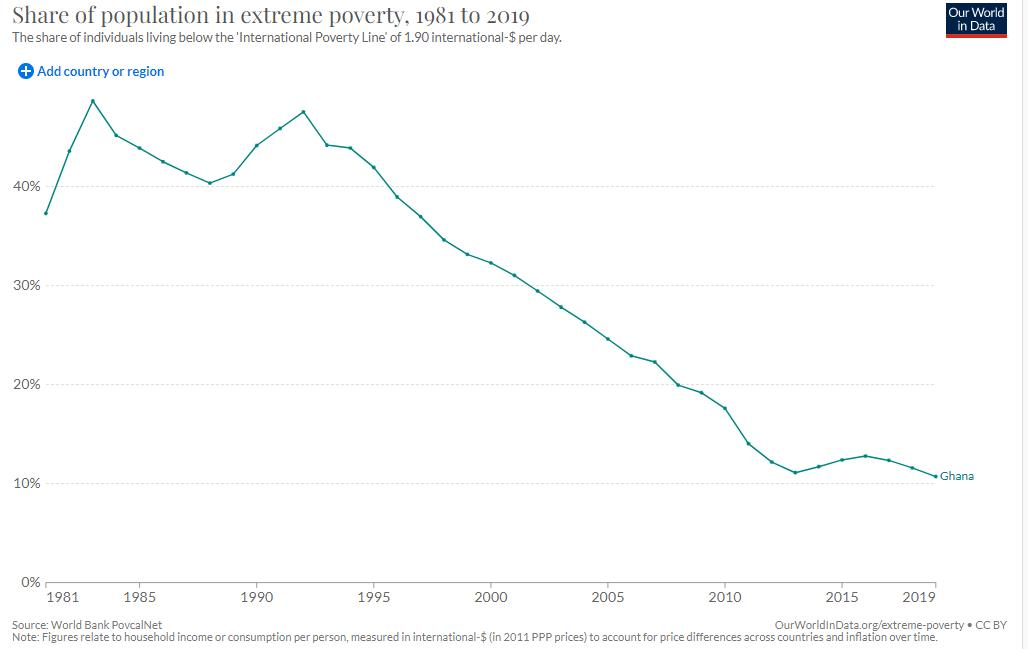
Share of population in extreme poverty over time, 1981 to 2019

The following table shows the main economic indicators in 1980–2026. Inflation below 5% is in green. Figures for 2026 are IMF projections.

Year	GDP (in billion US$ PPP)	GDP per capita (in US$ PPP)	GDP (in billion US$ nominal)	GDP growth (real)	Inflation rate (in percent)	Government debt (in % of GDP)
1980	11.5	959	38.7	▲0.5%	▲50.0%	n/a
1981	▲12.1	▲982	▲61.5	▼−3.8%	▲116.5%	n/a
1982	▼11.7	▼929	▲71.0	▼−8.3%	▲22.5%	n/a
1983	▼11.4	▼878	▼49.3	▼−6.2%	▲122.2%	n/a
1984	▲13.0	▲970	▼18.0	▲9.4%	▲40.0%	n/a
1985	▲14.2	▲1,042	▼16.0	▲6.4%	▲10.3%	n/a
1986	▲15.4	▲1,105	▼15.1	▲6.2%	▲24.5%	n/a
1987	▲16.9	▲1,180	▼12.7	▲6.7%	▲39.8%	n/a
1988	▲18.6	▲1,270	▲13.6	▲6.5%	▲31.4%	n/a
1989	▲20.2	▲1,346	▲13.7	▲4.5%	▲25.2%	n/a
1990	▲21.7	▲1,410	▲15.9	▲3.6%	▲37.2%	17.8%
1991	▲23.5	▲1,489	▲17.8	▲4.8%	▲18.1%	▼17.3%
1992	▲25.1	▲1,552	▼17.7	▲4.5%	▲10.0%	▲21.3%
1993	▲26.9	▲1,624	▼14.5	▲4.8%	▲24.9%	▲34.1%
1994	▲28.5	▲1,676	▼13.4	▲3.5%	▲24.9%	▲50.6%
1995	▲30.3	▲1,742	▲15.7	▲4.2%	▲59.3%	▼47.6%
1996	▲32.3	▲1,815	▲16.6	▲4.8%	▲44.5%	▼42.9%
1997	▲34.8	▲1,908	▲17.0	▲5.8%	▲24.8%	▲45.2%
1998	▲37.0	▲1,977	▲18.5	▲5.0%	▲19.2%	▼37.6%
1999	▲39.2	▲2,046	▲19.2	▲4.5%	▲12.5%	▲51.7%
2000	▲41.5	▲2,113	▼12.3	▲3.6%	▲25.1%	▲74.5%
2001	▲44.1	▲2,185	▲13.1	▲3.8%	▲32.9%	▼57.8%
2002	▲46.8	▲2,258	▲15.2	▲4.6%	▲14.8%	▼54.1%
2003	▲50.2	▲2,356	▲18.8	▲5.1%	▲26.6%	▼49.3%
2004	▲54.3	▲2,483	▲21.8	▲5.4%	▲12.7%	▼38.4%
2005	▲59.5	▲2,650	▲26.4	▲6.2%	▲15.1%	▼31.7%
2006	▲64.9	▲2,817	▲31.0	▲5.8%	▲11.7%	▼17.3%
2007	▲69.4	▲2,934	▲36.5	▲4.1%	▲10.7%	▲21.1%
2008	▲77.1	▲3,178	▲41.3	▲9.0%	▲16.5%	▲23.2%
2009	▲82.0	▲3,296	▼37.1	▲5.7%	▲13.1%	▲25.4%
2010	▲89.4	▲3,510	▲45.4	▲7.8%	▲6.7%	▲32.9%
2011	▲104.0	▲3,985	▲53.6	▲14.0%	▲7.7%	▼31.2%
2012	▲114.8	▲4,296	▲55.8	▲8.4%	▲7.1%	▲35.5%
2013	▲125.3	▲4,574	▲62.8	▲7.2%	▲11.7%	▲42.9%
2014	▲131.1	▲4,674	▼54.7	▲2.9%	▲15.5%	▲50.1%
2015	▲135.1	▲4,708	▼49.4	▲2.1%	▲17.2%	▲53.9%
2016	▲141.0	▲4,802	▲56.1	▲3.4%	▲17.5%	▲55.9%
2017	▲155.2	▲5,171	▲60.4	▲8.1%	▲12.4%	▲57.0%
2018	▲169.6	▲5,536	▲67.3	▲6.2%	▲9.8%	▲62.0%
2019	▲187.6	▲6,003	▲68.4	▲6.5%	▲7.2%	▲62.9%
2020	▲192.8	▲6,047	▲70.0	▲0.5%	▲9.9%	▲79.1%
2021	▲214.9	▲6,608	▲79.5	▲5.1%	▲10.0%	▲86.9%
2022	▲238.9	▲7,208	▼73.9	▲3.8%	▲31.9%	▲92.7%
2023	▲255.5	▲7,563	▲80.5	▲3.1%	▲39.2%	▼79.1%
2024	▲277.2	▲8,051	▲83.3	▲5.8%	▲22.9%	▼70.3%
2025	▲302.0	▲8,613	▲114.7	▲6.0%	▲14.2%	▼48.8%
2026	▲325.4	▲9,116	▲118.3	▲4.8%	▲5.8%	▲53.0%

== Economic sectors ==
=== Agriculture ===
In 2013 agriculture employed 53.6% of Ghana's total labor force. Agribusiness accounts for a small fraction of the gross domestic product. The main harvested crops are corn, plantain, rice, millet, sorghum, cassava and yam. Unlike the agricultural livestock, forestry and fishing sectors, the crop sector is key to the Ghanaian agricultural industry.

Ghana produced in 2018:

- 20.8 million tons of cassava (4th largest producer in the world, second only to Nigeria, Thailand and Congo)
- 7.8 million tonnes of yam (2nd largest producer in the world, second only to Nigeria)
- 4.1 million tons of plantain (2nd largest producer in the world, just behind Congo)
- 2.6 million tons of palm oil (8th largest producer in the world)
- 2.3 million tons of maize
- 1.4 million tons of taro (4th largest producer in the world, second only to Nigeria, China and Cameroon)
- 947 thousand tons of cocoa (2nd largest producer in the world, second only to Ivory Coast)
- 769 thousand tons of rice
- 753 thousand tons of orange (19th largest producer in the world)
- 713 thousand tons of pineapple (11th largest producer in the world)
- 521 thousand tons of peanut

In addition to smaller productions of other agricultural products, like sweet potato (151 thousand tons), natural rubber (23 thousand tons) and tobacco (2.3 thousand tons).

=== Manufacturing ===
Manufacturing is an important part of Ghana's industrial sector, although the economy remains more heavily weighted toward services and primary commodity exports. World Bank data show that manufacturing value added accounted for about 10% of Ghana's gross domestic product in 2024. Ghana's main manufacturing activities include agro-processing, food and beverages, cocoa processing, textiles and footwear, cement and construction materials, plastics, pharmaceuticals, metal and aluminium products, and vehicle assembly.

Agro-processing is one of the central components of Ghanaian manufacturing because of the country's agricultural base. The Ghana Investment Promotion Centre identifies agro-processing, cocoa processing, textiles and footwear, and light manufacturing as important areas for industrial development. Ghana's manufacturing base is linked to domestic agricultural production, including cocoa, cassava, rice, tomatoes, poultry, and other food crops, but local processing capacity remains uneven in several subsectors.

Government industrial policy has aimed to expand local production, reduce import dependence, and increase domestic value addition. The manufacturing sector has been supported through programmes such as industrial parks, import-substitution initiatives, the One District One Factory programme, and efforts to strengthen agro-processing, textiles and garments, iron and steel, wood processing, and other light manufacturing activities.

Ghana has also developed a vehicle assembly industry under the Ghana Automotive Development Programme. The Ghana Automotive Development Centre lists several bonafide assemblers under the programme, including Peugeot, Foton, Nissan, Hyundai, Volkswagen, Kantanka, Changan, ZX Auto, Toyota, Suzuki, Honda, Kia, Ashok Leyland, and Great Wall Motors. The programme is part of Ghana's wider strategy to develop the country as a competitive automotive assembly hub in West Africa.

Despite these developments, Ghana's manufacturing sector continues to face constraints, including competition from imports, limited local processing capacity in some industries, financing constraints, energy and infrastructure costs, and exposure to exchange-rate movements. The Ghana Investment Promotion Centre has noted that demand for manufactured products in Ghana exceeds domestic supply in several areas, requiring imports to fill the gap.

=== Mining ===
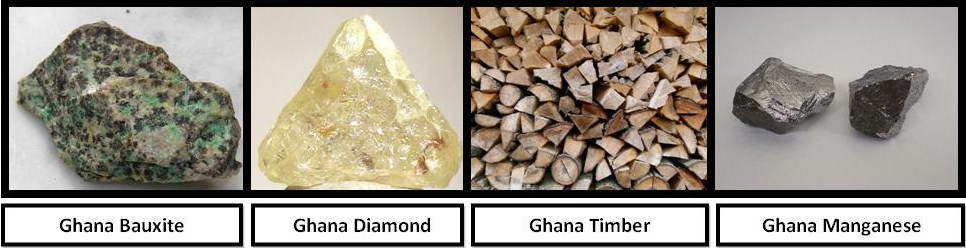
Ghanaian mineral resources: bauxite, diamond, timber and manganese

Mining in Ghana is a major contributor to the economy of Ghana, providing about 40% of its foreign exchange earnings as well as about 5.7% of its Gross Domestic Product. Gold dominates the mineral sector, contributing over 90% of total mineral exports. In 2019, Ghana overtook South Africa to become the largest gold producer in Africa, producing 142.4 metric tonnes of gold that year.

Ghana's mining sector produces minerals such as bauxite, manganese, natural gas, petroleum, salt, silver and diamonds. In 2020, the country produced approximately 1.16 million metric tons of bauxite, ranking it among Africa's top bauxite exporters. In recent years, Ghana has identified substantial lithium deposits.

=== Tourism ===
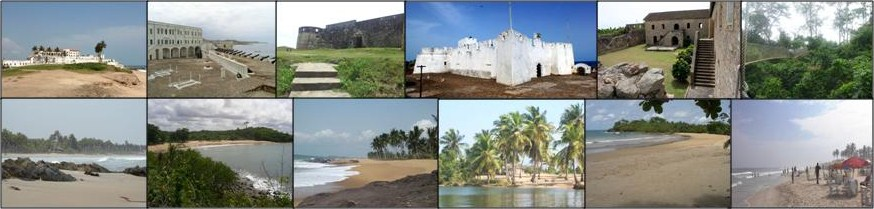
Tourism destinations in Ghana

The Ministry of Tourism has placed great emphasis upon further tourism support and development. Tourism contributed to 4.9% of GDP in 2009, attracting around 500,000 visitors. Tourist destinations include Ghana's many castles and forts, national parks, beaches, nature reserves, landscapes and World Heritage buildings and sites.

In 2011, Forbes magazine ranked Ghana eleventh-friendliest country in the world. The assertion was based on a survey of a cross-section of travelers in 2010. Of all the countries on the African continent that were included in the survey, Ghana ranked highest.

To enter Ghana, it is necessary to have a visa authorized by the Government of Ghana, except for certain entrepreneurs on business trips.

=== Telecommunications ===
Telecommunications is one of Ghana's most developed service industries and is central to the country's digital economy. The sector is regulated by the National Communications Authority (NCA), which licenses electronic communications networks and services, manages spectrum, and monitors market performance.

Mobile telephony is the dominant form of telecommunications access in Ghana. According to the NCA, Ghana had 43.49 million mobile voice subscriptions in February 2026, compared with 42.87 million in December 2025. The main mobile network operators are MTN Ghana, Telecel Ghana, and AT Ghana. At the end of December 2025, MTN Ghana accounted for 72.92% of mobile voice subscriptions, followed by Telecel with 20.17% and AT with 6.91%.

Mobile internet access has grown rapidly and accounts for most data subscriptions in the country. NCA data show that total data subscriptions increased from 31.30 million in December 2025 to 31.93 million in February 2026, while mobile network data subscriptions rose to 31.75 million. Total data penetration reached 94.34% in February 2026. In the mobile data market, MTN Ghana held 81.29% of subscriptions in February 2026, followed by Telecel with 14.50% and AT with 4.21%.

Fixed-line and fixed broadband services form a much smaller part of the market. In February 2026, Ghana had 265,634 fixed voice access lines and 183,387 fixed data subscriptions. Fibre broadband has expanded, but mobile networks remain the primary means of internet access for most users.

The NCA has continued to update service-quality rules for the sector. In February 2026, it announced amended quality-of-service key performance indicators for voice, data, and messaging services, replacing older benchmarks that had been in effect since 2004.

Ghana also has a comparatively liberal media environment. The Constitution of Ghana protects freedom of expression and prohibits censorship, while Reporters Without Borders ranked Ghana 39th out of 180 countries in its 2026 World Press Freedom Index, with a score of 72.20.

=== Banking ===
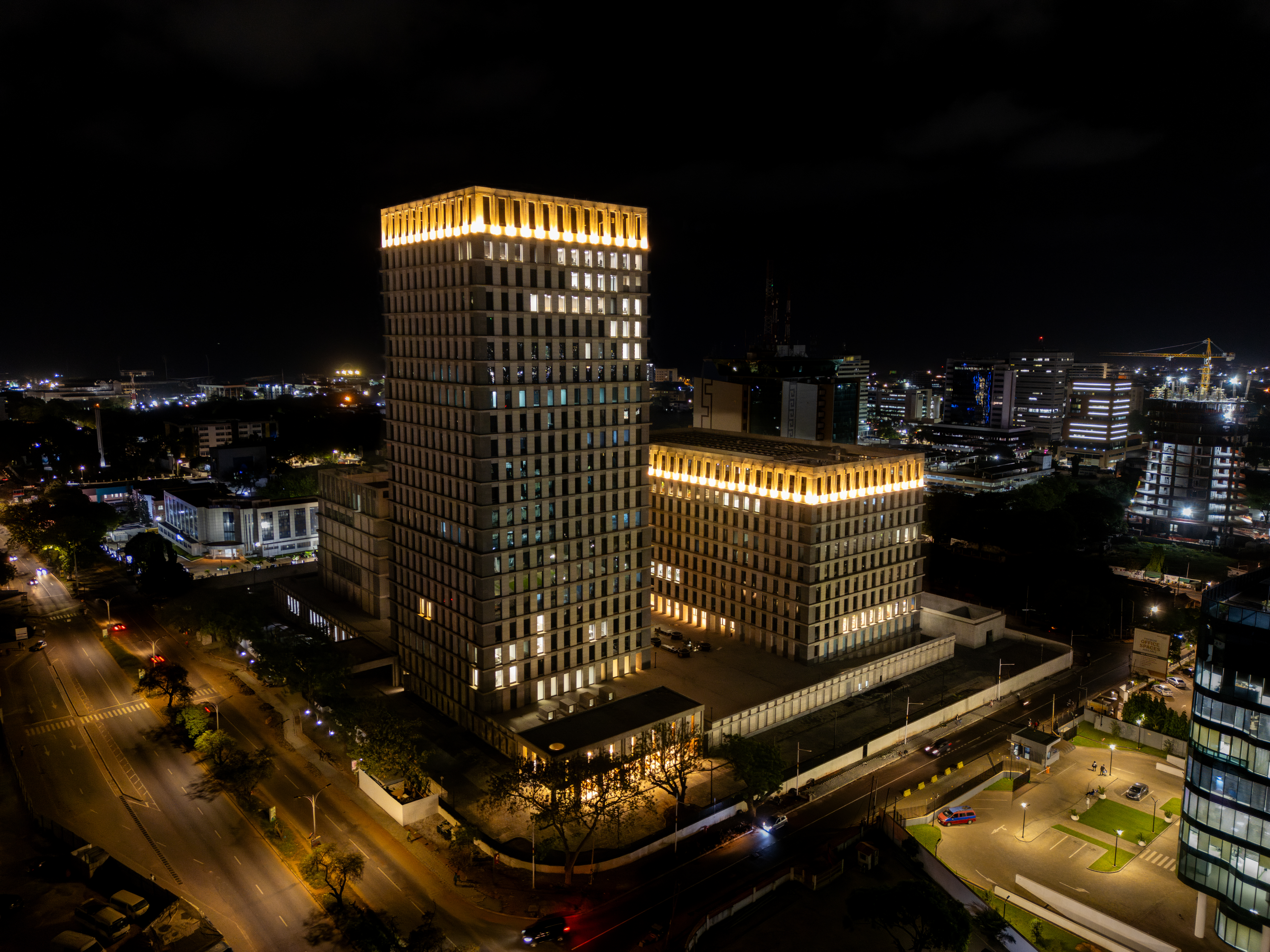
The Bank Square, headquarters of the Bank of Ghana in Accra

Ghana's banking sector is regulated by the Bank of Ghana, which licenses and supervises banks and other deposit-taking institutions. Since 2003, Ghana has operated a universal banking model, replacing the earlier separation between development, merchant, and commercial banking. Under this model, licensed banks may provide a broad range of banking services, including retail banking, corporate banking, trade finance, treasury services, and digital banking.

The Bank of Ghana lists 23 licensed banks operating in Ghana. These include locally owned banks, foreign-owned banks, and subsidiaries of regional and international banking groups. Major banks operating in the country include GCB Bank, Ecobank Ghana, Absa Bank Ghana, Stanbic Bank Ghana, Standard Chartered Ghana, Fidelity Bank Ghana, CalBank, Access Bank Ghana, Zenith Bank Ghana, and Consolidated Bank Ghana.

Ghana's banking sector underwent a major reform and clean-up process between 2017 and 2019, after the Bank of Ghana identified weaknesses in solvency, corporate governance, risk management, and regulatory compliance among some institutions. The reforms included higher minimum capital requirements, licence revocations, mergers, and the creation of Consolidated Bank Ghana to take over selected assets and liabilities of some failed banks.

The sector recovered after the clean-up, but was later affected by Ghana's macroeconomic crisis and the Domestic Debt Exchange Programme, which imposed losses on holders of domestic government securities, including banks. In its 2025 Financial Stability Review, the Bank of Ghana reported that the banking sector remained resilient, supported by improved profitability, higher capital adequacy, sustained liquidity, and asset growth, although non-performing loans remained elevated.

Digital financial services have become increasingly important within Ghana's banking system. Banks operate alongside electronic money issuers, payment service providers, mobile money operators, and fintech companies licensed or approved by the Bank of Ghana under the Payment Systems and Services Act, 2019.

=== Stock exchange ===
The Ghana Stock Exchange (GSE) is the principal securities exchange of Ghana. It was incorporated in July 1989 as a private company limited by guarantee, recognised as an authorised stock exchange in October 1990, and began trading on 12 November 1990. The exchange was officially launched on 11 January 1991 and moved to its offices at Cedi House, Liberia Road, Accra, in September 1993.

The GSE provides a market for the trading and listing of securities, including shares, bonds and other instruments. It operates the Main Market and the Ghana Alternative Market (GAX), with the Main Market subject to more stringent requirements and GAX designed with less stringent requirements for small and medium-sized businesses. The exchange also works with the Ghana Fixed Income Market for debt securities and publishes regular market reports and trading data.

As of the Ghana Stock Exchange's December 2025 Equities Market Report, the GSE Composite Index closed at 8,770.25 points, representing a year-to-date gain of 79.40%, while the GSE Financial Stocks Index closed at 4,647.17 points, up 95.19%. Market capitalization reached GH¢172.04 billion at the end of December 2025, compared with GH¢111.36 billion at the end of December 2024, a year-on-year increase of 54.50%.

=== Information technology and cybersecurity ===
Information and communications technology has become an important part of Ghana's education system, public administration, financial services, and digital economy. Ghana's ICT-in-education policy framework has promoted the use of technology for teaching and learning, digital literacy, teacher training, and wider access to internet connectivity in educational institutions.

Ghana has also pursued broader digital transformation through public-sector digitisation, broadband expansion, digital financial services, and support for digital innovation. In 2022, the World Bank approved US$200 million for the Ghana Digital Acceleration Project, intended to expand access to broadband, improve selected digital public services, and strengthen Ghana's digital innovation ecosystem. Ghana's Ministry of Communications, Digital Technology and Innovations describes the project as focused on expanding broadband access, improving selected digital public services, and strengthening the digital innovation ecosystem.

Ghana's cybersecurity framework has expanded significantly since the late 2000s. Earlier legislation included the Electronic Transactions Act, 2008 and the Electronic Communications Act, 2008, which provided legal foundations for electronic transactions, electronic communications, and digital services. The Cybersecurity Act, 2020 later established the Cyber Security Authority as the national regulator responsible for regulating cybersecurity activities and promoting the development of cybersecurity in Ghana.

The Cyber Security Authority is responsible for cybersecurity regulation, protection of critical information infrastructure, cybersecurity incident reporting, sectoral computer emergency response teams, and licensing of cybersecurity service providers. The authority also supports national cyber-awareness and coordination of responses to cyber threats.

In 2024, Ghana was ranked as a Tier 1 country in the International Telecommunication Union's Global Cybersecurity Index, the highest category in the index. The ITU describes Tier 1 countries as "role-modelling" states in cybersecurity commitment across legal, technical, organisational, capacity-development, and cooperation measures.

=== Real estate ===
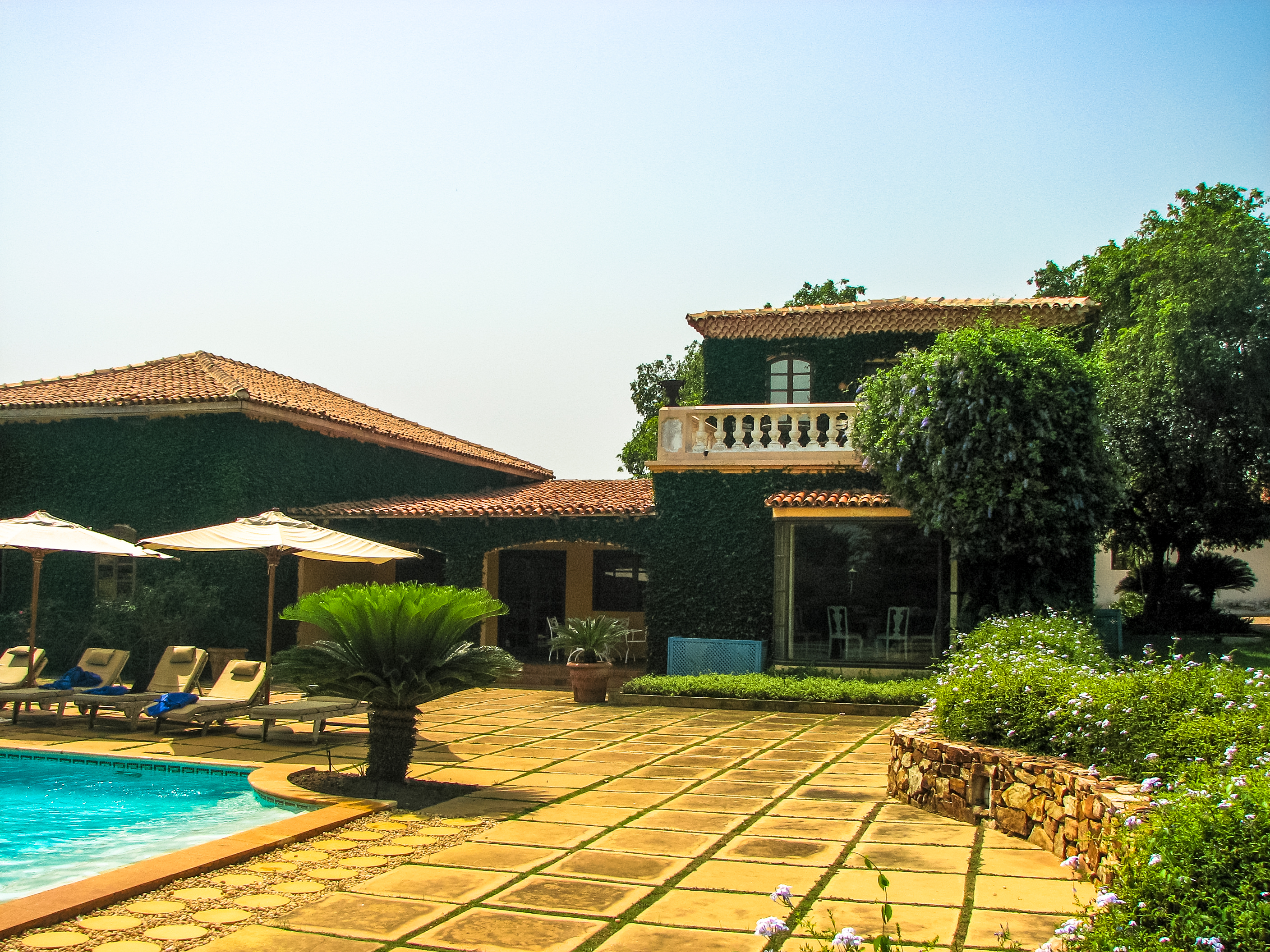
Residential property in southern Ghana

Real estate and housing are important parts of Ghana's urban economy, particularly in Accra, Kumasi, Tema, Sekondi-Takoradi and other growing urban centres. Demand for housing and commercial property has been driven by population growth, urbanisation, household formation, diaspora investment, and the expansion of services, construction and finance. According to World Bank data, Ghana's urban population accounted for more than half of the national population by the 2020s, increasing pressure on land, housing, infrastructure and urban services.

Ghana's real estate market includes public housing projects, private residential developments, commercial property, mixed-use developments, self-built housing and informal settlements. The Ghana Investment Promotion Centre identifies real estate and construction as investment areas linked to residential housing, offices, retail space, hospitality, industrial property and infrastructure-related development.

Housing affordability remains one of the sector's main challenges. Ghana has a housing deficit estimated at about 1.8 million units, with demand especially strong among low- and middle-income households. The Ghana Housing Profile found that housing supply, affordability, access to serviced land, construction costs, finance and infrastructure remain major constraints in the housing sector.

The formal real estate market is concentrated in major urban areas, while much housing production takes place through incremental self-building and small-scale private construction. High land prices, building-material costs, limited mortgage access and infrastructure gaps have made formal housing unaffordable for many households. These constraints have contributed to the growth of informal settlements and to a mismatch between high-end housing supply and lower-income housing demand.

Real estate income is subject to taxation in Ghana. The Ghana Revenue Authority applies rent income tax at 8% for residential premises and 15% for commercial and non-residential premises.

=== Pharmaceuticals and biotechnology ===
Ghana's health and biotechnology sector includes plant-medicine research, pharmaceutical regulation, clinical trials, biological products, and emerging vaccine-manufacturing initiatives. A major public institution in this field is the Centre for Plant Medicine Research (CPMR) at Mampong-Akuapem, formerly known as the Centre for Scientific Research into Plant Medicine. The centre was established by the Government of Ghana in 1975 to conduct research into medicinal plants and support the scientific development of herbal medicine.

The Ministry of Health describes the Centre for Plant Medicine Research as an institution for research into herbal medicine in Mampong Akuapem, in Ghana's Eastern Region. The centre produces herbal medicines and operates an out-patient clinic, linking scientific research with practical health-service delivery.

Ghana also has a regulatory framework for clinical trials, vaccines, biological products, and related health technologies. The Food and Drugs Authority regulates clinical trials in the country and states that its clinical-trials function is intended to ensure that trials are conducted according to ethical, quality, scientific, and good clinical practice standards. The FDA also provides registration and regulatory services for vaccines and biological products, including marketing authorisation, import and export permits, and oversight of biological-product applications.

In 2023, Ghana established the National Vaccine Institute through the National Vaccine Institute Act, 2023. The Act created the institute to coordinate and supervise research, development, and manufacturing of vaccines and sera in Ghana. The World Health Organization has described Ghana's vaccine-manufacturing ambition as linked to the strengthening of clinical-trials systems, pharmaceutical production capacity, and health-security infrastructure.

=== Healthcare ===
Healthcare delivery in Ghana is provided through a mixed public and private system. Public healthcare is led by the Ministry of Health and its agencies, including the Ghana Health Service, teaching hospitals, regulatory bodies and specialised public health institutions. Ghana's health policy is guided by the objective of achieving universal health coverage, which the Ministry of Health's 2020–2030 roadmap defines as ensuring that all people in Ghana have timely access to high-quality health services irrespective of ability to pay at the point of use.

The National Health Insurance Scheme (NHIS) is Ghana's main public health-financing mechanism. It is administered by the National Health Insurance Authority and is intended to reduce out-of-pocket payments and improve access to healthcare. In 2025, the NHIS reported active membership of about 18.5 million people, representing approximately 56% population coverage.

Healthcare services are delivered through teaching hospitals, regional hospitals, district hospitals, polyclinics, health centres, private clinics and community-based services. Primary healthcare remains central to Ghana's health system, particularly in rural and underserved areas, where access to hospitals and specialist services may be limited.

Despite progress in health financing and service delivery, Ghana continues to face inequalities in access, coverage and quality of care. A 2026 district-level spatial and machine-learning study by Valentine Golden Ghanem found that uninsurance in Ghana was geographically clustered and associated with district-level poverty and illiteracy, highlighting persistent subnational inequities in health-insurance coverage.

== Energy ==
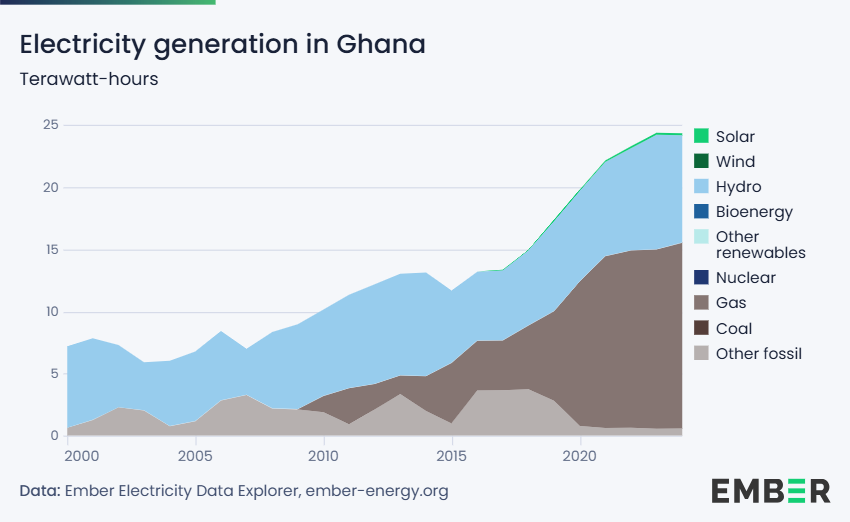
Electricity generation in Ghana in terawatt-hours

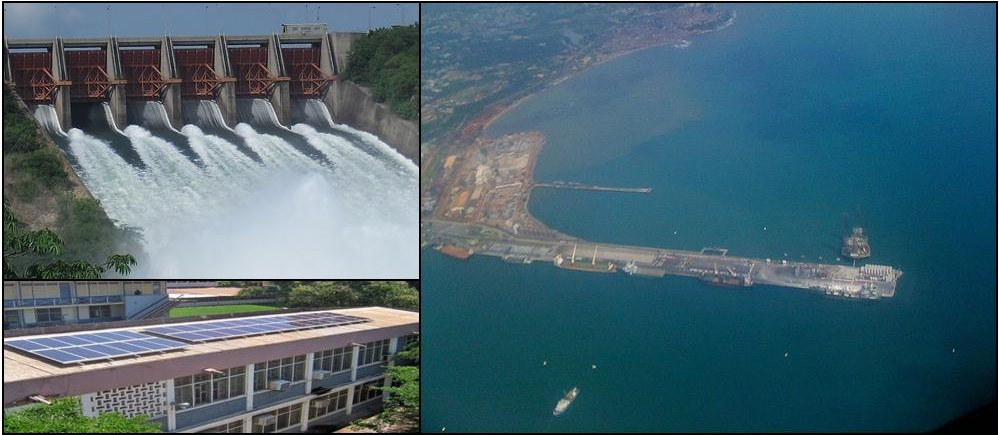
Hydropower and solar energy electricity generation industries, and oil and gas industry in Ghana

Ghana generates electric power from hydropower, fossil-fuel (thermal energy), and renewable energy sources such as wind and solar energy. Electricity generation is one of the key factors in order to achieve the development of the Ghanaian national economy, with aggressive and rapid industrialization; Ghana's national electric energy consumption was 265 kilowatt hours per person in 2009.

Ghana exports some of its generated energy and fossil fuels to other countries. Electricity transmission is under the operations of Ghana Grid Company. The distribution of electricity is under Northern Electricity Distribution Company and Electricity Company of Ghana.

According to data by the International Energy Agency, Ghana's electricity mix in 2021 relied on natural gas (62.6%) and hydropower (34.1%). Solar power accounted for less than one percent.

Total energy consumption in Terrawatt-hours (TWh) of Ghana
1980	1990	2000	2010	2020	2021
25	▲29	▲42	▲55	▲112	▲114
Per capita consumption in Kilowatt-hours (KWh)
2,135	▼1,900	▲2,117	▲2,142	▲3,484	▼3,483

=== Oil & Gas ===
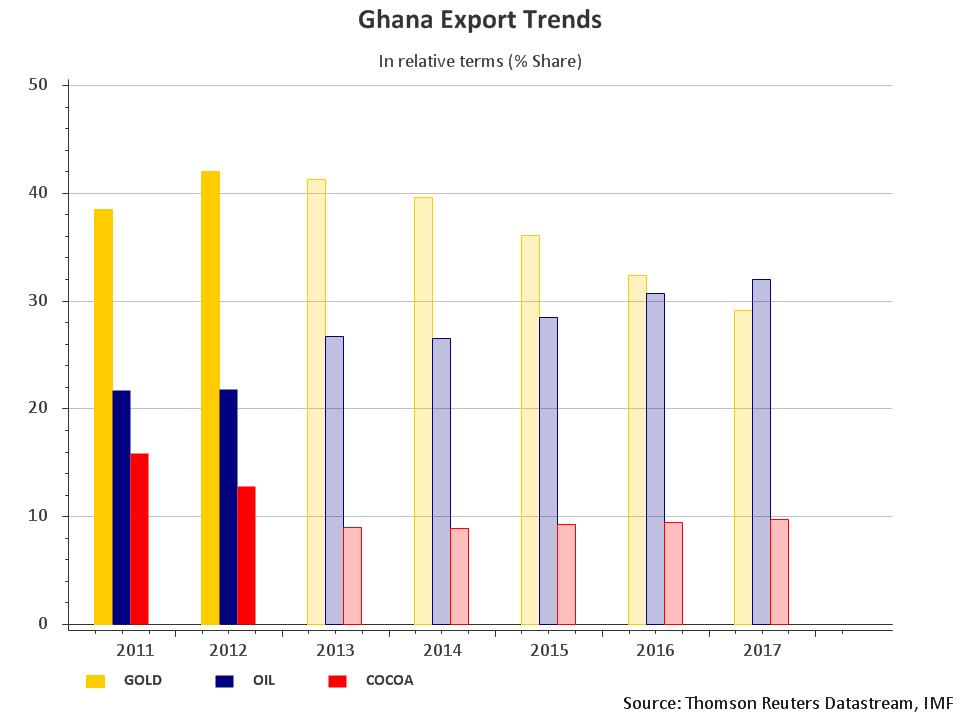
Ghana petroleum and commodities; exports in percentage.

The petroleum and gas industry of Ghana is regulated by the state-owned Ghana National Petroleum Corporation (GNPC) and administered by the state-owned Ghana Oil Company (GOIL).

Oil exploration started in the 1970s. Since GNPC and GOIL have developed multiple discoveries, and an oil refinery at the Tema Oil Refinery. Ghana discovered significant reserves of oil and natural gas offshore throughout the 2000s and 2010s.

The country officially became an oil & gas producer in 2010 with the commissioning of the Jubilee field by Tullow Oil and currently produces from three major offshore hubs: Jubilee, TEN, and OCTP. In 2021, its production stood at some 150,000 barrels of oil per day (bopd). Since production began in 2010 Ghana has rose to be the 34th largest national producer of oil.

In 2021 Ghana exported more than 71mil barrels of oil. China was the largest importer of Ghana oil, receiving over 41% of exports with South Africa, the second largest importer, taking 13.9%.

Some scholars have argued that Ghana has avoided the resource curse around fossil fuels, by providing legal checks on the system through the Civil Society Platform on Oil and Gas a public mechanism for checking the impact of oil on the country. The Petroleum Revenue Management Act (PRMA) in 2011 also created public governance frameworks for auditing revenue from the fields.

=== Solar energy ===
Solar power forms a small but growing part of Ghana's electricity sector. The country has high solar resource potential, and solar photovoltaic projects have been promoted as part of Ghana's broader renewable energy and energy-transition policies. However, Ghana's power system remains dominated by thermal generation and hydropower, with solar still accounting for a limited share of total electricity supply.

According to the Energy Commission's 2025 Energy Outlook for Ghana, renewable energy sources excluding large hydropower accounted for 132.145 MW of installed generation capacity at the end of 2024, representing 2.4% of Ghana's total installed generation capacity. This included solar photovoltaic plants operated by the Volta River Authority at Navrongo, Lawra and Kaleo, privately developed solar plants, the Bui solar facility, the Tsatsadu mini-hydro plant, and the Safisana biogas plant.

In 2025, the Energy Commission projected that other renewables, including solar photovoltaic and biogas generation at the sub-transmission level, would supply about 196 GWh, or 0.8% of total electricity supply. Thermal power plants were projected to supply 65.8% and hydropower 33.1% of electricity supply in the same year.

Ghana's Renewable Energy Master Plan, published in 2019, set a target to increase renewable energy capacity, excluding large hydropower, from 42.5 MW in 2015 to 1,363.63 MW by 2030, including 1,094.63 MW of grid-connected systems. Solar photovoltaic development is therefore treated as part of Ghana's long-term strategy to diversify electricity generation, reduce dependence on fossil-fuelled thermal plants, and expand decentralised energy access.

=== Wind energy ===
Wind power remains a prospective renewable energy source in Ghana rather than a major contributor to electricity generation. Studies have identified wind-resource potential in parts of the country, particularly along sections of the eastern coast, the Accra Plains, the Volta and Oti areas, and some elevated inland locations. However, large-scale wind power has not yet become a significant part of Ghana's installed electricity generation mix.

The Energy Commission's 2025 National Energy Statistical Bulletin reported that Ghana's total installed electricity generation capacity reached 5,749 MW in 2024. Hydropower accounted for 1,584 MW, thermal generation for 4,032 MW, and other renewable sources for 133 MW, or about 2% of installed capacity. In its 2025 Energy Outlook for Ghana, the Energy Commission projected that other renewables, including solar photovoltaic and biogas generation at the sub-transmission level, would supply 196 GWh, or 0.8% of total electricity supply in 2025.

Ghana's Renewable Energy Master Plan notes that significant data had been collected and feasibility studies were advanced to assess the economic potential of wind and remaining hydropower resources. The 2023 Integrated Power Sector Master Plan also states that intermittent renewable energy sources would need to be added in the medium term to help reduce generation costs and fossil-fuel dependence.

One of Ghana's best-known proposed wind projects is the Ayitepa Wind Farm in the Ningo-Prampram District of the Greater Accra Region. Mainstream Renewable Power describes the project as a 150 MW onshore wind farm in advanced development, with potential expansion by a further 75 MW.

=== Bio-energy ===
Bio-energy in Ghana is mainly associated with biomass, woodfuel, charcoal, agricultural residues, biogas, and potential liquid biofuels. Traditional biomass remains important for household cooking and small-scale commercial and industrial heating, although Ghana's energy policy has sought to modernise bio-energy use and reduce unsustainable dependence on woodfuel.

Ghana's Renewable Energy Master Plan identifies biomass, biogas, waste-to-energy and biofuels as part of the country's renewable-energy development strategy. The plan aims to promote investment in renewable energy while reducing dependence on biomass as the main fuel for thermal energy applications.

Woodfuel remains a major part of Ghana's energy use, especially for cooking. A World Bank analysis of Ghana's woodfuels sector reported that the share of woodfuels in national energy consumption fell from about 70% in 1990 to 35% in 2019, but that demand continued to rise in absolute terms because of population growth. The report also stated that firewood or charcoal remained the main cooking fuel for about 4.5 million households.

The Energy Commission's 2025 Energy Outlook for Ghana shows that biomass consumption remains concentrated in the residential sector, with smaller shares used in services and industry. The Commission has also tracked charcoal prices because charcoal is widely traded as a household and commercial cooking fuel.

Modern bio-energy projects in Ghana include biogas, waste-to-energy, and possible liquid biofuel production. However, their contribution to electricity generation remains small. In 2025, the Energy Commission projected that other renewables, including solar photovoltaic and biogas generation at the sub-transmission level, would supply about 196 GWh, or 0.8% of total electricity supply.

Ghana's Renewable Energy Act, 2011 provides a legal framework for renewable-energy development, including provisions on biofuel blends and woodfuel management. The Act gives the National Petroleum Authority responsibility for the pricing of designated biofuel blends under the prescribed petroleum pricing formula, while also requiring programmes to support sustainable woodfuel production and use.

=== Energy consumption ===
Electricity consumption in Ghana has increased with population growth, urbanisation, industrial activity, and wider access to the national grid. According to the Energy Commission's 2025 Energy Outlook for Ghana, projected electricity consumption for 2025 was 25,836 GWh, representing a 4.7% increase over 2024.

Ghana's electricity supply is dominated by thermal generation and hydropower, with other renewables still accounting for a small share of supply. The 2025 Energy Outlook projected that thermal power plants would supply 65.8% of electricity, hydropower 33.1%, and other renewables, including solar photovoltaic and biogas generation at the sub-transmission level, about 0.8%.

The 2025 Electricity Supply Plan projected Ghana system peak demand of 4,338 MW in 2025, compared with 3,952 MW in 2024. It also projected total energy consumption of 28,339 GWh in 2025, including transmission losses.

Ghana experienced a major power crisis between 2012 and 2016, popularly known as dumsor, during which electricity shortages and load shedding affected households and businesses. Power-sector reliability and finances have remained important policy issues, including arrears owed to independent power producers and gas suppliers. In 2025, the government paid US$1.47 billion to clear legacy energy-sector debts and restore a World Bank partial risk guarantee linked to gas supplies for power generation.

== Imports and exports ==
Exports of Ghana by product category (2019) Chemical products Transportation Machines Mineral products Plastics and rubbers Metals Foodstuffs Precious metals Textiles Instruments Animal products Vegetable products Paper goods Footwear and headwear Miscellaneous Stone and glass Wood products Animal and vegetable bi-products Animal hides Arts and antiques Weapons

Ghana's external trade performance strengthened significantly in 2025, driven largely by strong commodity exports. Total export earnings reached approximately US$31.1 billion, while total imports stood at approximately US$17.4 billion, resulting in a trade surplus of about US$13.6 billion.

Ghana's principal export commodities include gold, which accounted for approximately 62.9% of total exports in 2025, followed by cocoa beans and cocoa products, crude petroleum, manganese ore, and processed agricultural products.

Major export destinations for Ghana include Switzerland, South Africa, United Arab Emirates, China, and India.

On the import side, Ghana primarily imports refined petroleum products, industrial machinery, motor vehicles, rice and cereals, electrical equipment, and construction materials. Major import partners include China, Netherlands, India, United States, and Belgium.

=== Trade and exports ===
Ghana's external trade is strongly influenced by commodity exports, especially gold, cocoa and crude petroleum, while imports are dominated by petroleum products, machinery, vehicles, industrial inputs, food products and consumer goods. The country is a member of the World Trade Organization, the Economic Community of West African States and the African Continental Free Trade Area.

Ghana recorded a large merchandise trade surplus in 2025, supported mainly by higher gold export earnings. According to the Bank of Ghana, total exports increased to US$31.11 billion in 2025, while total imports reached US$17.45 billion, producing a trade surplus of US$13.66 billion, equivalent to 12.1% of GDP.

Gold is Ghana's largest export earner. In 2025, gold exports were valued at US$20.98 billion, followed by cocoa exports at US$3.86 billion and oil exports at US$2.62 billion. Other exports were valued at US$3.65 billion. In 2024, the World Trade Organization listed Ghana's leading merchandise exports as gold, crude petroleum, cocoa beans, cocoa paste, cocoa butter, manganese ore, cashew nuts, processed tuna, vegetable fats and iron or steel products.

Ghana's major export destinations in 2024 included Switzerland, the United Arab Emirates, South Africa, the European Union, China, India, Canada, Burkina Faso, the United States and Brazil. The country's main import partners included China, the European Union, the United Arab Emirates, the United Kingdom, India, the United States, Switzerland, Russia, South Africa and Canada.

Ghana's imports include refined petroleum products, machinery and equipment, motor vehicles, cement clinker, cereals, chemicals, pharmaceuticals, electrical equipment and other manufactured goods. In 2024, the WTO recorded Ghana's total merchandise imports at US$17.15 billion and total merchandise exports at US$20.00 billion.

The country's main seaports are the Port of Tema and the Port of Takoradi, both operated by the Ghana Ports and Harbours Authority. Tema is Ghana's principal container and import gateway, while Takoradi handles a large share of bulk exports. In 2024, the Port of Takoradi handled 36.8% of Ghana's national seaborne traffic, 77.4% of national seaborne exports and 16.6% of national seaborne imports. Major commodities handled at Takoradi include manganese, bauxite, cocoa, clinker, wheat, petroleum products and equipment for the mining and oil and gas industries.

As of February 2026,multilateral debt accounted for 42% of the country's total external debt stock.

=== Trade statistics ===
Trade statistics in US$ millions
Year	Goods exports	Goods imports	Net trade
2023	▲$16,703	▲$14,009	▲$2,694
2020	▲$14,472	▼$12,429	▲$2,043
2015	▲$10,321	▲$13,465	▼−$3,144
2010	▲$7,960	▲$10,922	▼−$2,962
2005	▲$2,802	▲$5,347	▼−$2,545
2000	▲$1,936	▲$2,767	▼−$830
1990	▼$897	▲$1,205	▼−$308
1980	$1,104	$908	▲$195

Customs clearance is handled through the Integrated Customs Management System (ICUMS), on which importers file the bill of entry and the customs declaration. An importer must first obtain an import declaration form from the Ministry of Trade and Industry and a tax clearance certificate from the Ghana Revenue Authority; food, drugs and cosmetics additionally require registration with the Food and Drugs Authority, and plant and animal products with the Plant Protection and Regulatory Services Directorate.

== Challenges ==
Ghana has faced recurring macroeconomic challenges, including high public debt, fiscal deficits, inflation, exchange-rate volatility, energy-sector arrears, and dependence on commodity exports. These pressures intensified in the early 2020s, when rising borrowing costs, currency depreciation, high inflation and limited access to international capital markets contributed to a severe economic crisis.

In December 2022, Ghana defaulted on most of its external debt and began a comprehensive debt restructuring process. The government completed a domestic debt restructuring in 2023 and later restructured its Eurobonds in 2024. Ghana also reached and formalised debt-relief agreements with official bilateral creditors as part of efforts to restore debt sustainability under its IMF-supported programme.

The International Monetary Fund approved a 39-month Extended Credit Facility arrangement for Ghana in 2023 to support macroeconomic stabilization, debt restructuring, fiscal consolidation and structural reforms. By 2026, the IMF stated that the programme had delivered substantial stabilization gains, including lower inflation, higher external buffers, improved confidence in the cedi and marked gains in debt sustainability. The World Bank reported that by 2025 Ghana's comprehensive debt restructuring was nearly completed, although negotiations on remaining external commercial debt were still ongoing.

Inflation and exchange-rate instability have also been major challenges. Ghana's inflation peaked at 54.1% in December 2022 during the crisis before falling sharply in 2025 and 2026 as monetary policy, fiscal consolidation and external-sector conditions improved. Despite the improvement, inflation management, exchange-rate stability and rebuilding policy credibility remain important priorities.

Ghana's power sector has also created fiscal pressures. The country has accumulated arrears to independent power producers and gas suppliers, partly reflecting power-purchase obligations, fuel costs and tariff-recovery challenges. In 2025, the government paid US$1.47 billion to clear legacy energy-sector debts and restore a World Bank partial risk guarantee linked to gas supplies for power generation.

Ghana's economy remains exposed to external shocks because of its reliance on commodity exports, especially gold, cocoa and crude petroleum. Fluctuations in commodity prices, climate risks affecting agriculture, global financial conditions and domestic fiscal policy can therefore have significant effects on growth, public finances and the balance of payments.

== Economic transparency ==
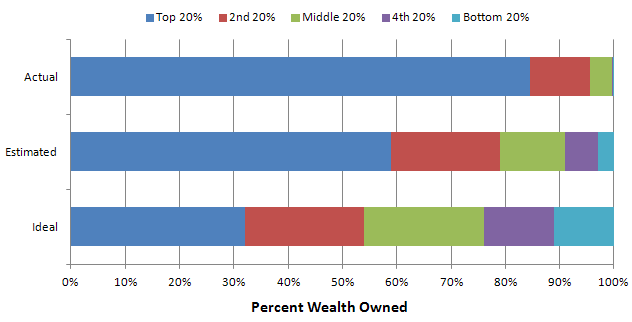
The distribution of wealth ownership in Ghanaian society in 2013. A majority of wealth is held by 20% of the population.

The judicial system of Ghana deals with corruption, economic malpractice and lack of economic transparency. Despite significant economic progress, obstacles do remain. Particular institutions need reform, and property rights need improvement. The overall investment regime lacks market transparency. Tackling these issues will be necessary if Ghana's rapid economic growth is to be maintained.

According to Transparency International's 2022 Corruption Perception Index, Ghana was ranked 72nd out of 180 countries, with a score of 43 on a scale where a 0–9 score means highly corrupt, and a 90–100 score means very clean. This was based on perceived levels of public sector corruption. John Addo Kufuor, son of former President John Agyekum Kufuor and Kojo Annan, son of former Secretary-General of the United Nations Kofi Annan, have been named in association with the Panama Papers.

== Child labor ==
The 2010 United States Department of Labor estimated over 2.7 million child laborers in Ghana, or about 43% of all children aged 5–14. 78.7% of these children work in agriculture, 17.6% in fishing and transportation services, and 3.7% in industry, which includes manufacturing work and mining. In Ghana 64% of children seek work for financial reasons, making it the leading driver for child labor in the region. Most children working in rural areas are working on family farms and often combine schooling with their work. In Urban areas, such as Accra and Ashanti children are often not enrolled in school and are often engaged in artisanal fishing and domestic services. Child porters, locally called kayaye, work in urban areas and some of them are as young as 6 years.

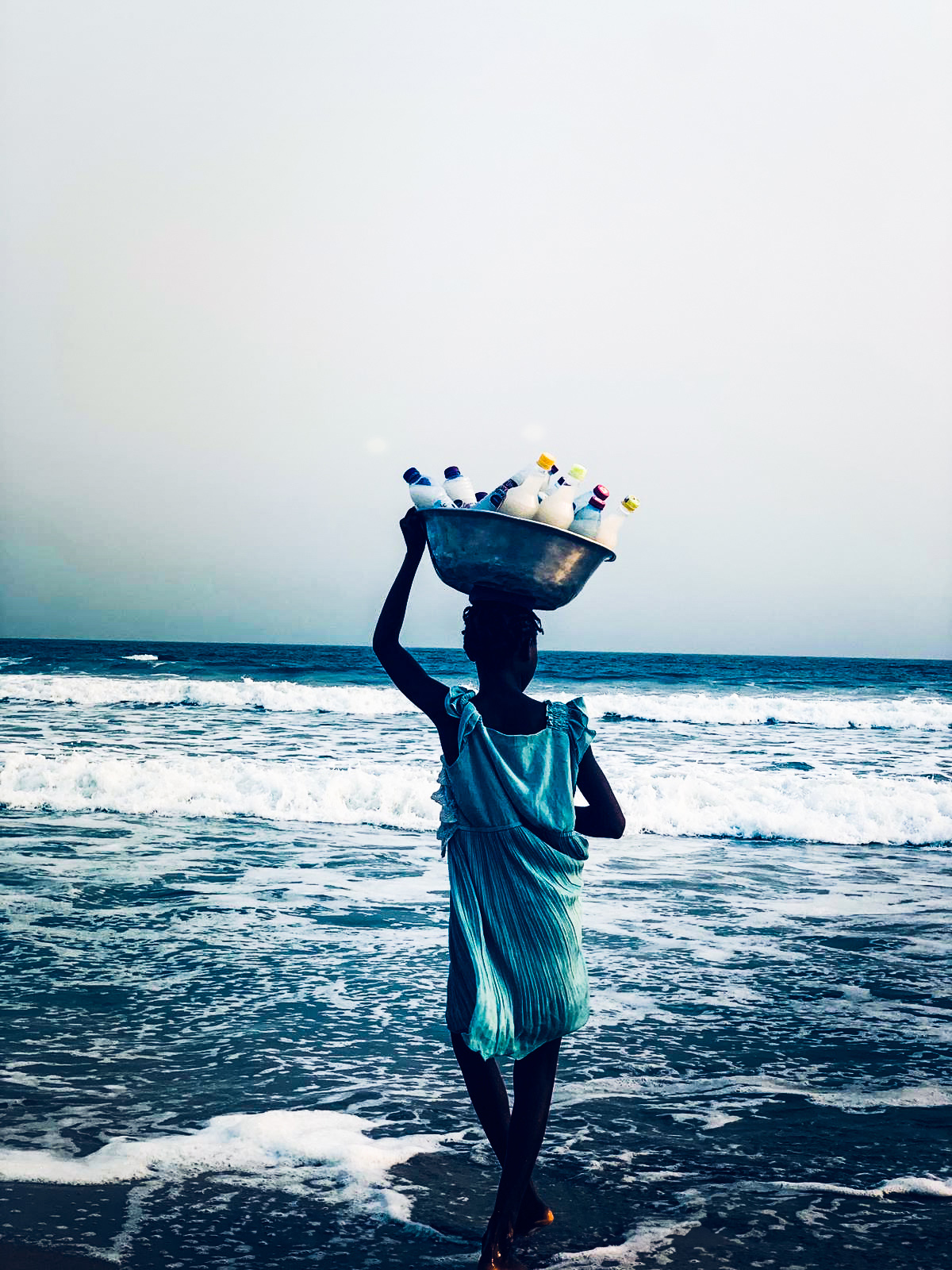
A young 'kayaye' girl engaged in selling palm wine in Ghana

Agriculture, fishing and artisan mining were the largest employers.

In southern Volta region, children work in religious servitude for a period ranging between few months to three years. They are known as trokosi (literally: wife of a god), fiashidi, or vudusi. This practice requires young girls to work and serve the religious order, in order to atone for family members’ alleged sins or as an offering for the family's good fortune. This practice is claimed to be also present in neighboring countries, even though it has been outlawed and carries a prison term under the laws of Ghana and neighboring countries.

In 2013, statistics on children's work have not changed much and according to the DOL's Findings on the Worst Forms of Child Labor in Ghana, the majority of working children engage in hazardous activities like pesticide spraying in the production of cocoa, fishing and gold mining. The Department's 2014 List of Goods Produced by Child Labor or Forced Labor includes fish and tilapia in particular, cocoa and gold as goods produced in such working conditions in Ghana.

== See also ==
- Economic history of Ghana
- United Nations Economic Commission for Africa
- List of countries by gold production
