= List of shopping malls in Ghana =

This article shows a list of shopping malls in Ghana:

== List ==
Greater Accra Region

- Accra Mall
- Marina Mall Accra
- Junction Mall
- Oxford Street Mall
- West Hills Mall
- Achimota Retail Centre
- A&C Mall
- Melcom Mall
- China Mall
- Oyarifa Mall
- Kitea mall
- Palace mall
- Atlantic Mall
- Ghana international mall

Ashanti Region

- Kumasi City Mall
- KNUST Jubilee Mall
- SG Mall
