= Ring Road Central =

Major urban arterial road in Accra, Ghana

- Interactive map of Ring Road Central
- Type: Urban arterial road / ring-road extension
- Owner: Accra Metropolitan Assembly
- Maintained by: Urban Roads Department (Ghana)
- Length: 3.5 km (2.2 mi)
- Location: Accra, Greater Accra Region, Ghana
- Quarter: Accra Central Business District (CBD)
- Coordinates: 5.5560°N 0.2040°W
- North-west end: Kwame Nkrumah Circle
- Major junctions: Liberation Road, Ring Road East, Oxford Street
- South-east end: Black Star Square

Other
- Known for: Commercial frontage, heavy traffic, CBD connectivity
- Status: Active

Ring Road Central is an urban arterial road in Accra, Ghana, forming the central segment of the city's ring-road network. The road links key nodes such as Kwame Nkrumah Circle, Independence Avenue, and the Accra Central Station, passing through dense commercial, transport, and residential districts. It is an artery for public transport and urban mobility, handling significant daily traffic volumes.

== History ==
The central ring road network, including Ring Road Central, was developed during the 1950s and 1960s to facilitate traffic flow around Accra's old city center and connect emerging commercial and administrative districts. Over the decades, the road has been resurfaced and modernized with interchanges and traffic management systems to handle increasing vehicle volumes.

== Route ==
Ring Road Central begins at Kwame Nkrumah Circle in the northwest, proceeding southeast through central Accra neighborhoods including Adabraka and Usshertown. It intersects other major routes such as Ring Road West, Independence Avenue, and Liberation Road, providing direct access to commercial centers, bus and tro-tro terminals, and government buildings.

== Landmarks ==
Significant locations along or adjacent to Ring Road Central include:

- Kwame Nkrumah Circle – a major roundabout and transit hub linking Ring Road Central to other arterial routes.
- Black Star Square – the ceremonial and historical landmark at the southern end of the corridor.
- Various media offices, banks, commercial buildings, and retail centers along the road contributing to CBD activity.

== Economy and urban character ==
Ring Road Central supports a dense mix of commercial, governmental, and residential activities. Businesses, banks, and retail outlets rely on the road for visibility and access, while the corridor remains a key route for goods and passenger transport.

== Transportation challenges and planning ==
The corridor faces heavy congestion during peak hours, pedestrian-vehicle conflicts, and limited parking. Urban authorities and the Ghana Police Service periodically implement traffic management measures including diversions and decongestion exercises to improve flow and safety.

== In popular culture and media ==
Ring Road Central often appears in local news coverage and documentaries highlighting Accra's urban mobility challenges and city life along the central business corridor.

== See also ==
- Ring Road East
- Ring Road West
- Accra Mall
- Oxford Street, Accra
- Transport in Ghana
- Greater Accra Region
