= Ring Road East, Accra =

Major urban arterial road in Accra, Ghana

Ring Road East
- Interactive map of Ring Road East
- Type: Urban arterial road / ring-road extension
- Owner: Accra Metropolitan Assembly
- Maintained by: Urban Roads Department (Ghana)
- Length: 4.0 km (2.5 mi)
- Location: Accra, Greater Accra Region, Ghana
- Quarter: North Ridge, Osu, Circle
- Coordinates: 5.5735°N 0.1797°W
- North-west end: Danquah Circle
- Major junctions: Tetteh Quarshie Interchange, Kwame Nkrumah Circle
- South-east end: Osu / Gulf of Guinea coast

Other
- Known for: High traffic volume, commercial frontage, urban mobility
- Status: Active

Ring Road East is an urban arterial road in Accra, the capital of Ghana. It forms the eastern section of the city’s broader "Ring Road" network and links key nodes including the Danquah Circle, the NSC/GBC area, the Tetteh Quarshie Interchange and the coastal neighbourhood of Osu. The corridor features dense commercial frontage, public transport termini, and remains one of the busiest urban traffic routes in the city.

== Route ==
Ring Road East begins at the Danquah Circle roundabout, which links the road to the western and central sections of the city, then proceeds eastwards through North Ridge, crosses the NSC/Ghana Broadcast Corporation area (GBC), passes the Tetteh Quarshie Interchange, and continues toward the coastal Osu district and the Gulf of Guinea. The road serves as a link for traffic distribution, public transport routes (tro-tros and buses) and frontage for commerce and residential areas.

== History ==
The Ring Road network, including its East segment, was originally constructed in the 1950s–1960s as part of Accra’s post-independence urban planning efforts to circumnavigate the older city-core and manage circulation around the metropolis. Over subsequent decades the road has been progressively upgraded (with interchanges and resurfacing) to respond to growing traffic volumes.

== Landmarks ==
Landmarks and nodes along Ring Road East include:

- The Ghana Broadcasting Corporation (GBC) headquarters and studio district.
- Danquah Circle – a major roundabout and transport hub linking Ring Road East with Osu, Cantonments and other corridors.
- Several transport terminals, tro-tro stands and bus stops serve the corridor given its role in public transport distribution.

== Economy and urban character ==
Ring Road East is characterised by dense mixed-use development including retail shops, media offices, government service buildings and residential apartments along the length of the corridor.

== Transportation challenges and planning ==
The corridor remains heavily trafficked, especially during peak hours, and suffers from congestion, pedestrian-vehicle conflicts, and limited parking in some segments. Upgrades such as flyovers, interchange improvements and signalisation have been undertaken as part of the city’s mobility improvement programme.

== In popular culture and media ==
Ring Road East frequently features in visual media (news reports, urban documentaries) as a representation of Accra’s heavy traffic and urban transit environment.

== See also ==
- Oxford Street, Accra
- Cantonments Road
- Transport in Ghana
- Greater Accra Region
- Liberation Road, Accra
- Spintex Road, Accra
