= Markets in Ghana =

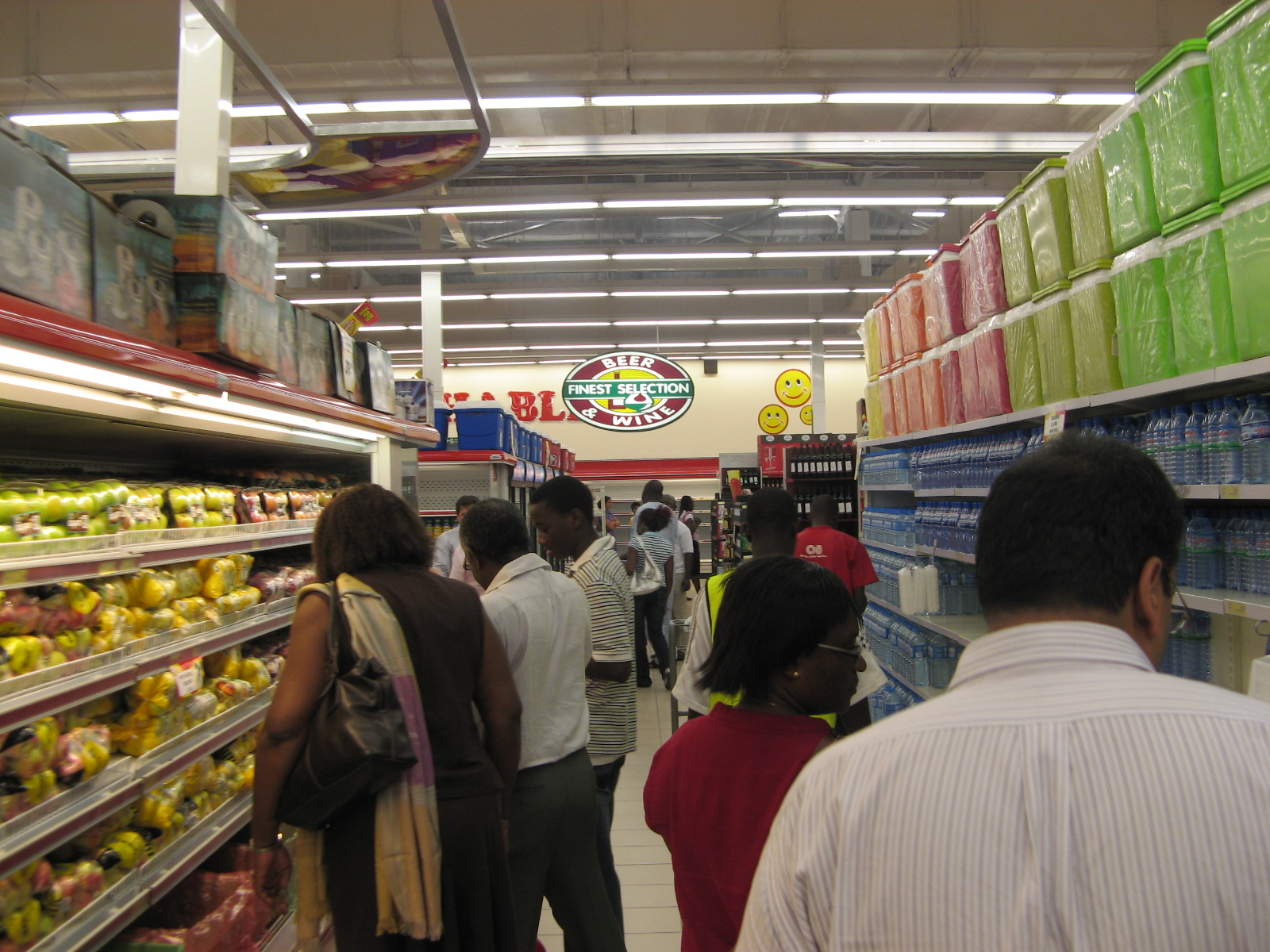
Supermarket and Shopping Centre in Accra, Ghana

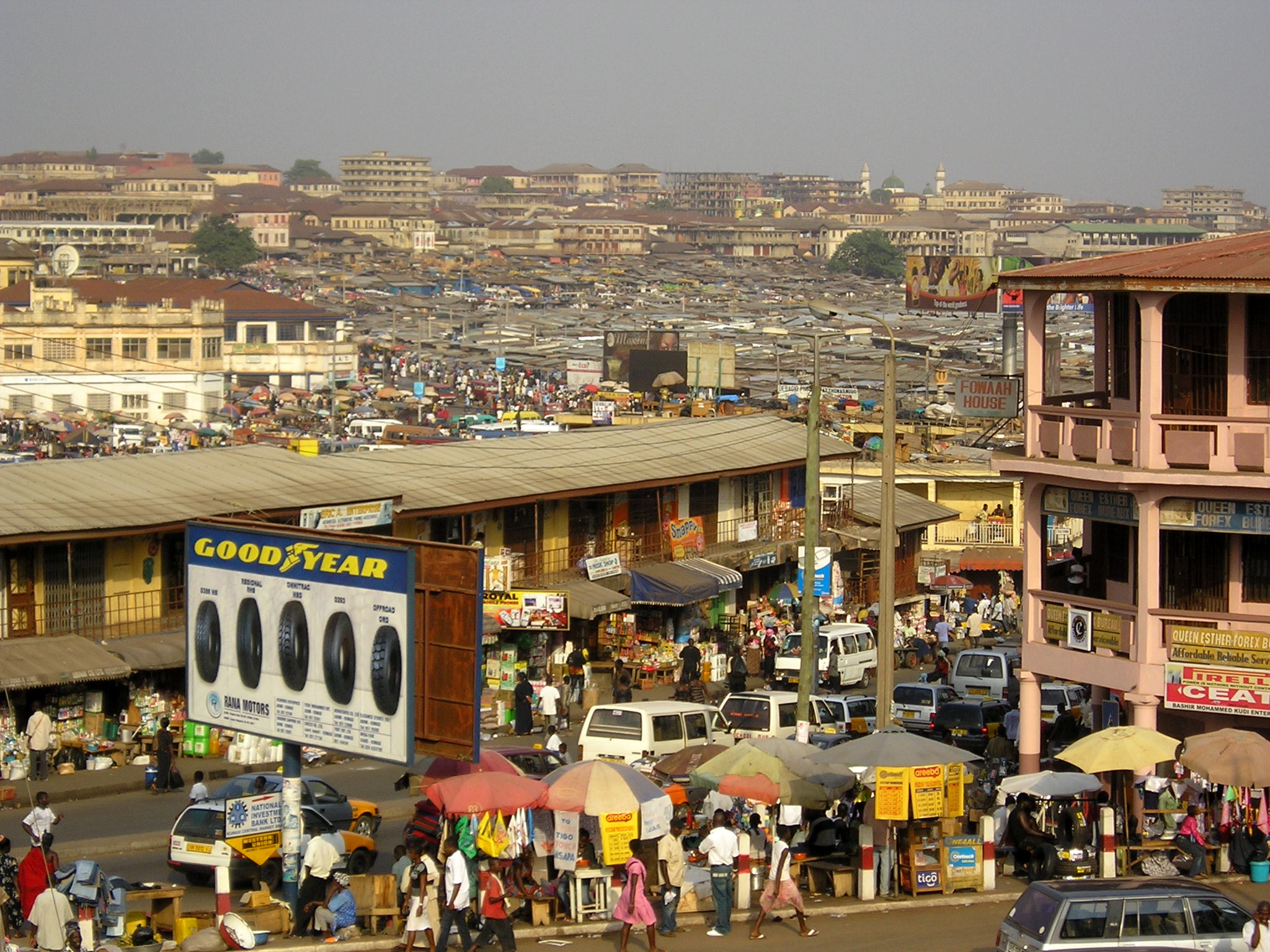
Kumasi market

Markets are essential to the Economy of Ghana

== History of markets ==
Trading in the country begun when the first settlers arrived in the region. Like many countries in Africa, the main method of trading was through the barter system. People used to exchange goods and services for commodities and services that was believed to measure up to what was being offered. As trade became more liberalized, people used to trade their goods and services for cowries known locally as "cedie". This later became the country's currency - the cedi.

== Supermarkets ==
The Accra Mall remains Ghana's prime supermarket. The mall, which started operations in the 2008, sought to improve the Ghanaian shopping experience. It is located on the Spintex Road adjacent the Tema Motorway. Other major supermarkets include Melcom. The company was established in 1989 and its primary shop was opened in Accra Central by 1991. It has branches across the regions of the country including the single largest shop in Ghana; Melcom Plus in Kaneshie, covering an area of over 90,000 square feet.

== Street markets ==
There are sixteen administrative regions in Ghana with each having its own regional capital. Every region has at least one major street market where peculiar goods and services offered at minor street markets would be readily available and at a cheaper price. Some of the major street markets in the country are:

- Kotokoraba Market in Cape Coast - Central region
- Market Circle in Takoradi - Western region
- Kejetia in Kumasi - Ashanti region
- Kantamanto in Accra - Greater Accra region
- Makola Market in Accra - Greater Accra region
- Kintampo market in Kintampo - Brong-Ahafo region
- Tamale Central Market in Tamale - Northern region
- Kaneshie market in Kaneshie - Greater Accra region
- Bantama in Kumasi - Ashanti region
- Tafo in Kumasi - Ashanti region
