= Danquah Circle =

Roundabout in Accra, Ghana

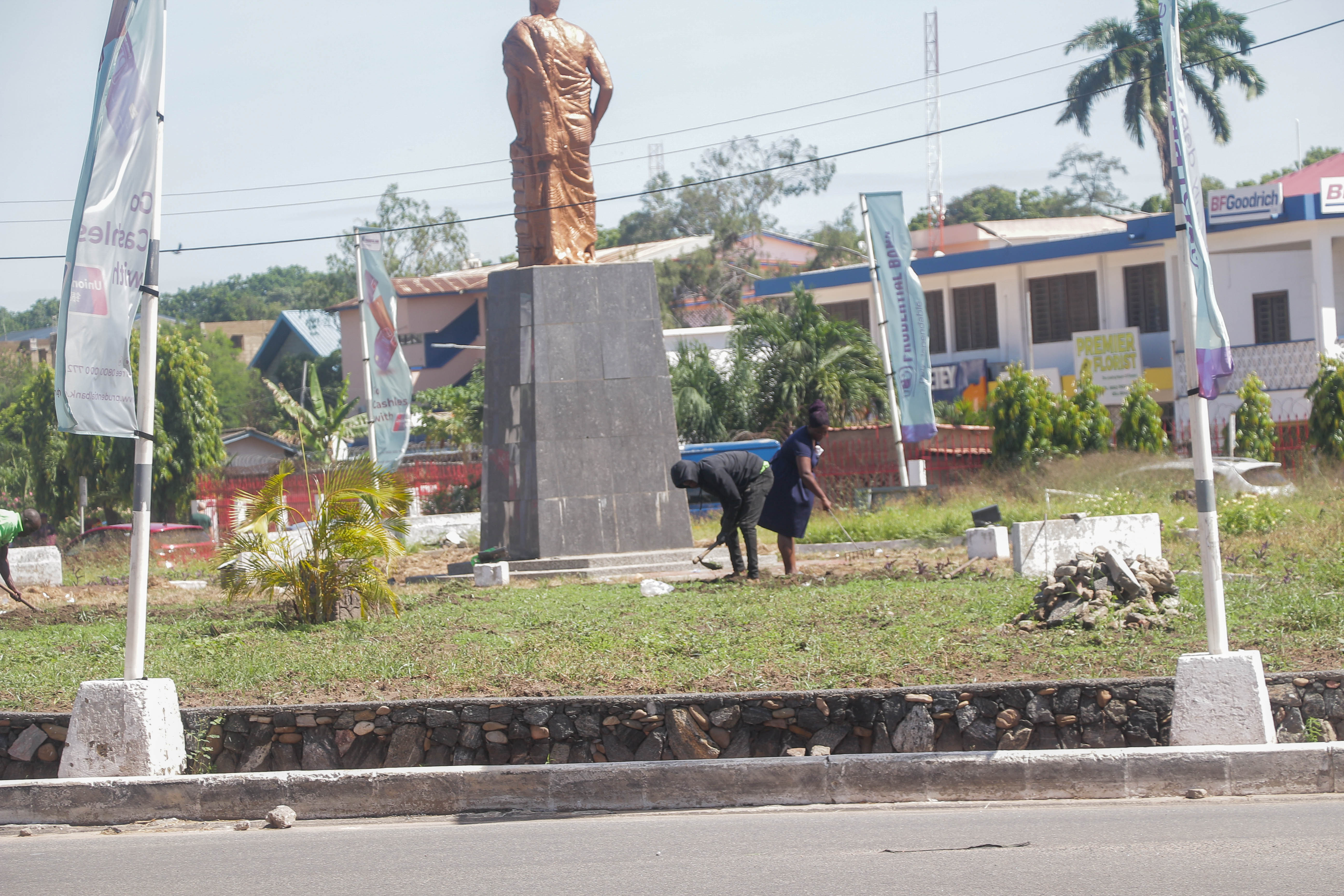
- Street view of Danquah Circle, with the Danquah statue
- Interactive map of Danquah Circle

Location
- Osu, Accra, Ghana
- Coordinates: 5°34′0″N 0°10′51″W
- Roads at junction: Ring Road East; Oxford Street; Cantonments

Construction
- Constructed: c. 1950s
- Opened: Before 2015

Danquah Circle is a roundabout and traffic interchange in Osu, Accra, Ghana. It is a key node of the city's arterial road network, linking Ring Road East, Oxford Street and Cantonments. Serving as both a traffic and cultural landmark, the circle was named in honour of J. B. Danquah, a member of The Big Six and a leading figure in Ghana's independence movement.

Danquah Circle is an urban junction that facilitates movement between central Accra, Labadi, Cantonments, and Osu. It carries an estimated 28,000 vehicles daily, according to the Ghana Investment Promotion Centre (GIPC) in 2015.

== Description ==
Danquah Circle is in Osu, Accra, approximately one mile from Kwame Nkrumah Interchange, which was named after Kwame Nkrumah, the first president of Ghana, and at the Ako Adjei Interchange to Labadi. The roundabout connects Ring Road East to Oxford Street and Cantonments. The roundabout features a bronze statue of J. B. Danquah, surrounded by sculptures and statues illustrating the culture of Ghana, such as "Pounding Fufu" and "Drumming the Bongo Drums". These monuments have been described as "non-partisan" and historically significant by local historians and civic commentators. According to the Ghana Investment Promotion Centre in 2015, Danquah Circle carries an estimated 28,000 vehicles daily.

== History ==
Danquah Circle dates back to the 1950s when Accra's early urban planning schemes sought to decongest the central city and improve connectivity toward the newly developing eastern suburbs. Following Ghana's independence, the circle was dedicated to The Big Six member J. B. Danquah. After Danquah's death, his son requested that the Ghanaian government construct a statue commemorating Danquah at the circle. In 1978, sculptor Saka Acquaye was asked to erect the statue, but the government, led by Ignatius Kutu Acheampong, was overthrown that year.

In 1988, a series of protests in support of the Palestinian Liberation Organization occurred at Danquah Circle, where demonstrators burned a small coffin covered with the flag of Israel. In 1990, Jerry Rawlings supported the creation of the Danquah statue, which was erected on 7 January 2001, the same day John Kufuor was sworn in as president, and revealed to the public in 2007.

Since 2003, the circle has been used by AIDS organizations to strategically place billboards, of which, as of 2008, there are seven of them. Danquah Circle was renovated in 2007 as part of Ghana's 50th anniversary, but the nearby Kwame Nkrumah Interchange was not. On 26 May 2024, the Department of Urban Roads, under the Ministry of Roads and Highways, began construction near the Danquah Circle, which ended on 29 July. The construction was in collaboration with the International Hospitals Group and the Ministry of the Interior to improve the drainage system and pedestrian safety near the police station's hospital. On 20 January 2025, GhanaWeb reported that the University of Ghana historian Kweku Darko Ankrah cited the statue at Danquah Circle as non-controversial due to its historical relevance and the critical thinking behind its erection.
