= Kwame Nkrumah Avenue (Accra) =

Major commercial and historic avenue in Accra, Ghana

- Nkrumah Avenue
- Interactive map of Kwame Nkrumah Avenue
- Former name: Farrar Avenue (colonial era)
- Namesake: Kwame Nkrumah, Ghana’s first President
- Type: Avenue
- Owner: Accra Metropolitan Assembly
- Maintained by: Urban Roads Department (Ghana)
- Length: 2.8 km (1.7 mi)
- Area: Central Accra
- Location: Accra, Greater Accra Region, Ghana
- Quarter: Tudu, Adabraka, and Central Business District
- Coordinates: 5.5581°N 0.2029°W
- West end: Ring Road Central (Adabraka)
- East end: Kinbu Road / Kojo Thompson Road (Central Accra)

Construction
- Construction start: 1950s
- Completion: 1960s
- Inauguration: 1966

Other
- Known for: Commercial centres, historical landmarks, and proximity to Kwame Nkrumah Mausoleum
- Status: Active

Kwame Nkrumah Avenue is a major avenue and one of the principal thoroughfares in Accra, the capital of Ghana. It stretches from Ring Road Central in Adabraka through Tudu to the Central Business District, connecting several important commercial, historical, and civic institutions.

== History ==
Originally known as Farrar Avenue during the colonial period, the street was renamed after Ghana's first president, Kwame Nkrumah, following independence in 1957. Th renaming symbolized national pride and the shift from colonial to indigenous leadership. During the 1960s, the area developed into a mixed-use corridor, combining administrative buildings, shops, and transportation hubs.

== Route and layout ==
The avenue begins at Ring Road Central near Adabraka and runs eastwards toward Kinbu Road and Kojo Thompson Road near Makola Market. It forms part of Accra's core commercial and traffic circulation system, connecting the central market area, banking district, and government precinct.

== Landmarks ==
Landmarks and institutions along Kwame Nkrumah Avenue include:

- Kwame Nkrumah Mausoleum and Memorial Park – the resting place of Ghana's first President and a major tourist site.
- Accra Technical University – one of Ghana's oldest tertiary institutions.
- Tudu Transport Terminal – a major interchange connecting central Accra with other parts of the city.
- Ridge Hospital (Greater Accra Regional Hospital) – located nearby, serving as a landmark along the corridor.
- Numerous banks, retail stores, and electronic shops that define the avenue's strong commercial identity.

== Economy and activity ==
Kwame Nkrumah Avenue is one of Accra's busiest commercial corridors, hosting banks, telecommunications offices, automobile dealers, hotels, and small retail businesses. The avenue's proximity to Makola Market, Kinbu Gardens, and the Ministries area makes it a hub for traders, civil servants, and visitors.

Street-level economic activity is characterized by a blend of informal trading and established retail shops.

== Transportation ==
The avenue serves as a traffic corridor linking the Ring Road to central Accra. It is accessible by public transport, especially through trotro and taxi services operating between Tudu, Circle, and the Ministries enclave. Pedestrian movement is high, and traffic congestion is common during peak hours. The Urban Roads Department (Ghana) has proposed the installation of smart traffic lights and pedestrian walkways to improve safety and flow.

== Cultural and historical importance ==
Kwame Nkrumah Avenue embodies Ghana's postcolonial transformation and civic identity. The nearby Kwame Nkrumah Mausoleum serves as a venue for official commemorations such as Independence Day and Founder's Day events. The street and its surroundings often feature in Ghanaian films, news coverage, and city documentaries as symbols of Accra's urban dynamism and political legacy.

== In popular culture ==
The avenue is frequently referenced in local music, poetry, and literature as a symbol of movement and resilience in Accra's fast-paced urban life. It is also featured in documentaries exploring Ghana's independence journey and Nkrumah's enduring legacy.

== See also ==
- Accra Technical University
- Makola Market
- Transport in Ghana
- Accra
