= Kasapreko =

Ghanaian beverage company

Kasapreko Company Limited
- Type: Private
- Industry: Beverage, alcohol
- Founded: 1989
- Founder: Dr Kwabena Adjei (president & group chairman)
- Headquarters: Spintex Road, Accra, Ghana
- Area served: Worldwide
- Products: Storm Energy Drink, Alomo (Gold, Black, Silver, Bitters), K20 Wisky, Royal Drinks (Apple, Cola, Orange, Lemon Splash, Honey Bee), Tonic Wine, Carnival Strawberry, Kalahari Bitters, Veraldo, Hi5 ChocoMalt
- Number of employees: 580 (2017)
- Website: http://kasapreko.com

Kasapreko Company Limited (KCL) is a Ghanaian ISO 22000:2005 certified indigenous manufacturer and producer of alcoholic and non-alcoholic drinks. Alomo Bitters, a herbal-based alcoholic drink, is KCL's flagship product. Kasapreko was 6th according to the 2012 Ghana Club 100 rankings. In 2017 KCL was awarded top Ghanaian company in the competitive beverage sector by the Association of Ghana Industries.

== History ==
Kaspreko was started in 1989 by Dr Kwabena Adjei, a Ghanaian businessman at Nungua in the Greater Accra Region of Ghana, to provide quality and affordable drinks to Ghanaians.

== Brands ==
KCL key brands include:

=== Alcoholic ===
- Alomo Bitters
- Kalahari Bitters
- Hand sanitizer

=== Non-alcoholic ===
- Storm Energy Drink
- Awake drinking water
1. Royal Drinks
- 10/10
- Veraldo
- 5 Star Multi Fruit
- Puma Drinks
- Kiki Juice Drink

== Antibiotics ==
In 2020, the company decided to go into mass production of alcoholic hand sanitizer to fight against the novel coronavirus as result of shortage in the market.

== Awards ==
Kasapreko was named the Outstanding Alcoholic Beverage Company of the Year at the 2019 West Africa Business Excellence Awards (WABEA). In 2020 the company was one of twelve businesses that won awards at the ninth Association of Ghana Industries (AGI) Ghana Industry and Quality Awards.

== Ambassadorial deals ==
On July 24, 2018, the company awarded one of Ghana's female influential movie stars. Nana Ama McBrown, the ambassadorial deal to promote their Royal Drinks product. The products include Royal Apple, Royal Orange, Royal Cola, Royal Honey Bee, and Royal Lemon Splash.

Diana Hamilton was named as the new brand ambassador for Awake Purified Drinking Water. The signed partnership deal would see the gospel award-winning musician promote the product to the companies' consumers.

In September 2017, the "Kakai" hitmaker, Shatta Wale, was chosen by the KCL as the brand ambassador for Storm Energy Drink at Achimota Retail Center. At the event, Wale said, "I want Ghanaians to be proud of things produced in the country. I accepted storm energy drink because it was made in Ghana. I would like Ghanaians to patronise the drink and products from Kasapreko even when they are outside the country."

On 19 July 2023, the KCL awarded a contract renewal to Wale as the brand ambassador for Storm Energy Drink.
