= La Tante DC10 Restaurant =

Airplane restaurant in Accra, Ghana

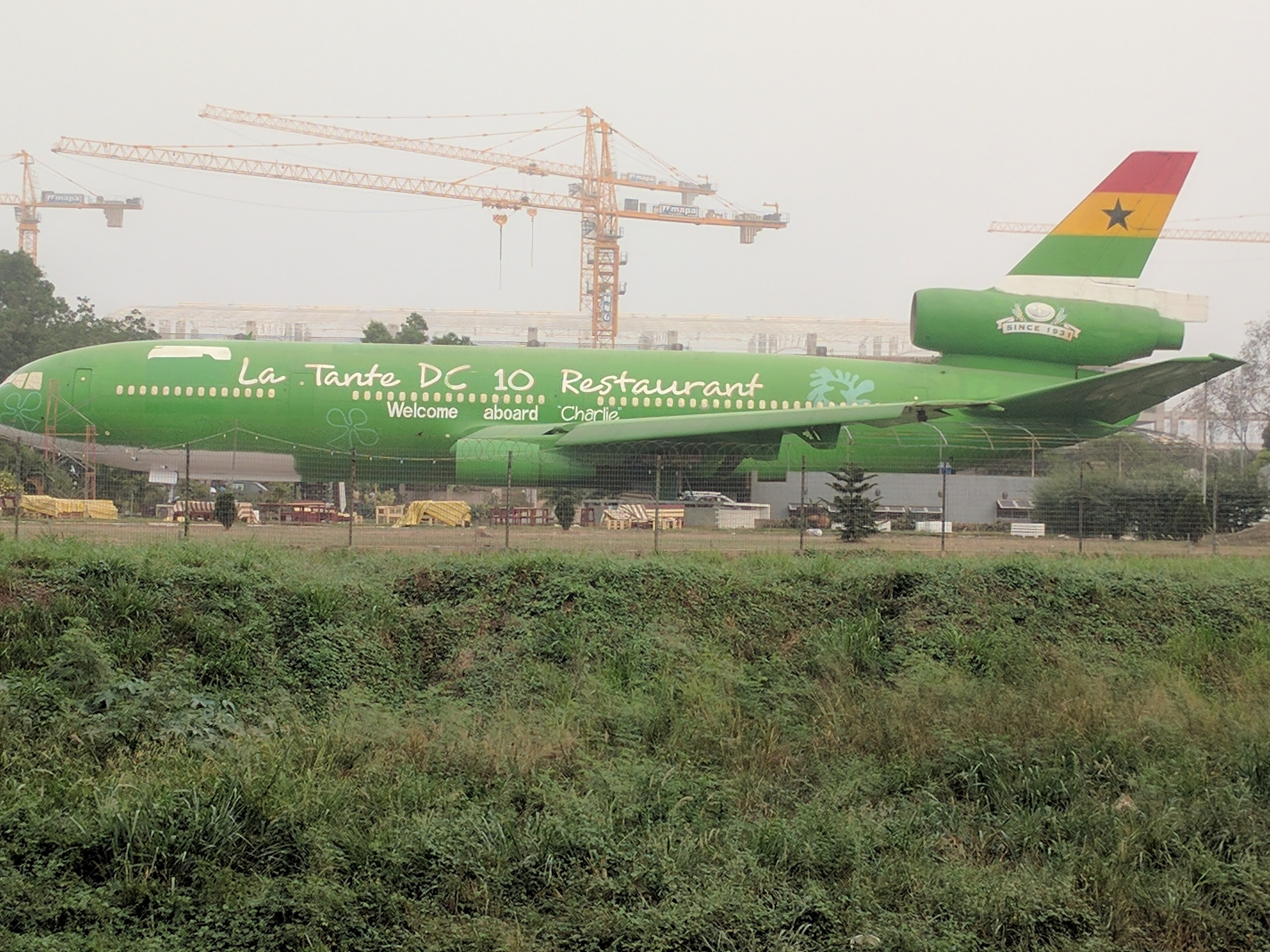
- Interactive map of La Tante DC10 Restaurant

Restaurant information
- Established: 9 November 2013; 12 years ago
- Closed: 2023
- Owners: Ghana Airport Company Limited; Vindira Company Limited
- Food type: Ghanaian cuisine
- Dress code: Casual
- Location: Opposite Marina Mall Accra, Accra, Airport City Accra, Ghana
- Coordinates: 5°36′10″N 0°10′29″W
- Seating capacity: 118
- Website: latantedc10.com

La Tante DC10 Restaurant, known locally as The Green Plane, was a public–private partnership restaurant established in Accra. It operated from the defunct Ghana Airways McDonnell Douglas DC-10, which had been in operation as a passenger jet between 1983 and 2005. The restaurant served staple Ghanaian dishes. The restaurant was well received locally. The restaurant closed in 2023 and the aircraft was scrapped.

== Description ==
La Tante DC10 Restaurant was a restaurant located inside a converted McDonnell Douglas DC-10 formerly used by the defunct Ghana Airways. Formerly flying 380 passengers, it was converted into a 118-seat restaurant with large numbers of the seats removed in order to provide adequate space for patrons and for the installation of dining tables. An annex was attached to the right side of the fuselage to accommodate the kitchen.

The airplane itself was moved to Airport City Accra, a suburb of Accra near to Accra International Airport and opposite Marina Mall Accra, with people entering and exiting the plane/restaurant via a covered staircase from ground level. They entered through the former first class seating area, which has been converted into a waiting area. Separate bathrooms were installed for male and female diners and the restaurant was air-conditioned throughout.

=== Menu ===
The restaurant served Ghanaian cuisine. These included staples such as spiced tilapia, served with banku, a type of maize-based porridge. Other dishes included jollof rice with chicken, and "red red" black-eyed pea stew with fish. While the prices at La Tante DC10 Restaurant were higher than those normally seen in the local area, the restaurant priced itself lower than the upmarket restaurants elsewhere in Accra.

== History ==
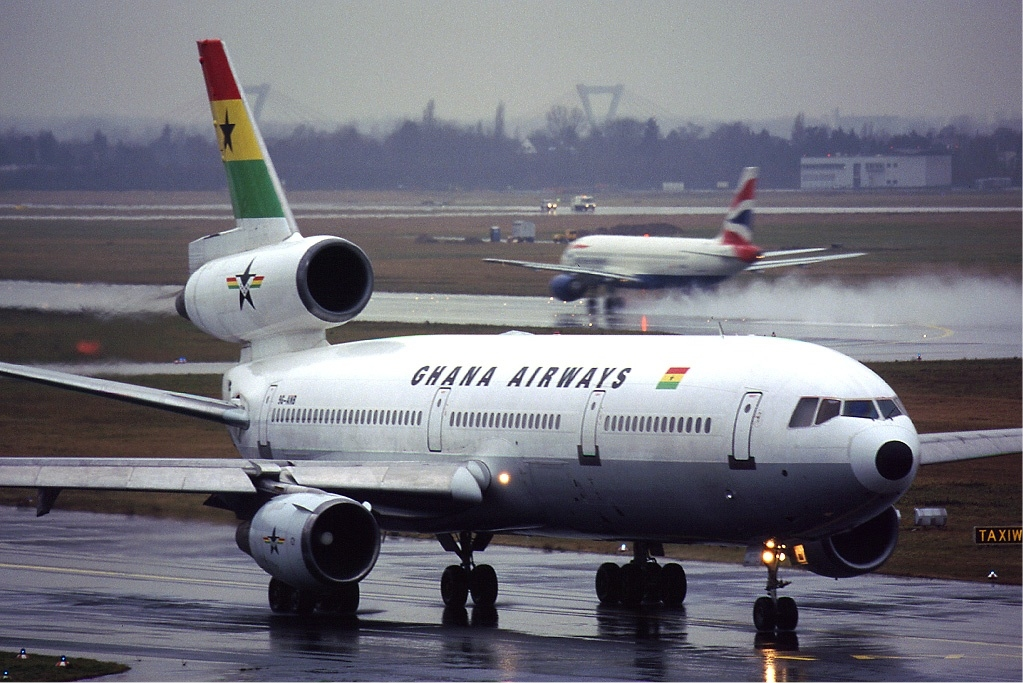
The DC-10 in 2002 at Düsseldorf Airport

The DC-10 used as the restaurant was formerly owned and operated by Ghana Airways on routes between Ghana and both Europe and the United States. Ghana Airways ordered a DC-10-30 in 1976, with it arriving on 24 February 1983. During July 1985, it was used to fly United Nations troops in and out of Beirut, Lebanon. In January the following year the plane was used under contract from Caribbean Airlines to fly passengers from Europe to the Caribbean twice weekly.

In June 2002, the plane was impounded at London Heathrow Airport, United Kingdom, following unpaid debts of £4 million owned by the national carrier to parts supplier AJ Walters Aviation, causing services between Accra, the UK and Italy to be temporarily suspended. The airline went bankrupt in 2005. Following this, the plane was abandoned and left at Kotoka Airport; over the course of the following years, various parts were sold for scrap, including the three engines.

At the time it was purchased by the wife of the Togolese Minister in 2011, there had been preparations to salvage the plane for its aluminium. The plane was converted and re-opened as a restaurant on 11 November 2013 as a public-private partnership between the Ghana Airport Company Limited and Vindira Company Limited. It was the first time that a plane based restaurant has opened in Africa.

The restaurant closed in 2023 and the aircraft was towed away and broken up.

== Reception ==
The restaurant proved popular with diners; manager Indira Shiyam explained in an interview with BBC News in 2014 that "At first, people wanted to have a feel of restaurant in a plane but surprisingly they keep coming". Some of the diners ate in the restaurant because they have never been inside a plane before, while others were curious about eating in a plane-based restaurant.

Ask the Pilot columnist Patrick Smith visited the restaurant in 2016; his review was later published in Business Insider. He said it was cheap and good, but not exceptional. He criticised the "lack of context" given to the restaurant, as he would have enjoyed seeing photos of the plane when it was in use as a passenger jet. Smith said "Many restaurants have long and storied histories, but usually just in one place! Here's a restaurant that has literally been everywhere."
