= Kumasi City Mall =

Shopping centre in Ghana

- Location: Kumasi, Ghana
- Coordinates: 6°42′35.2″N 1°37′33.1″W
- Address: Ashanti New Town Road
- Opened: May 10, 2017
- Floor area: 18,000 m^{2} (190,000 sq ft)
- Website: www.kumasicitymall.com

The Kumasi City Mall (KCM) is a shopping mall located in Kumasi, Ghana. It is the first of its kind in the city. The Kumasi City Mall cost $95 million and took 24 months to complete. Kumasi City Mall provides a convenient and highly accessible shopping destination to the entire city. The tenant mix caters for the broadest possible sector of the market. The mall is one of the biggest malls in West Africa. The property is owned by Delico Kumasi Limited, which is a fully owned subsidiary of Delico Property Investment Ghana limited, the same group that owns the Achimota Retail Center and is the Majority shareholder of West Hills Mall in Accra.

== History ==
The Asantehene, Otumfour Osei Tutu II cut the sod for the project on 6 June 2014 and construction took 24 months to complete. The grand opening was scheduled on April 20, 2017, where Otumfuo Nana Osei Tutu II was expected to cut the ribbons for its opening. Construction commenced in June 2014 and the mall was completed in April 2017. The official opening was postponed to May 10 2017.

A part of the ceiling at the Kumasi City Mall caved in on December 11 2018. The incident happened at the food court area of the mall. It happened at a time the shops in the mall were about to open for business.

== Management ==
Kumasi City Mall is managed by a four-member Board of Directors. Its regular operations are run by Broll Ghana limited as the property managers and AttAfrica Asset Managers as the Asset Managers.

== Location ==
KCM is located at Asokwa a suburb of Kumasi on the confluence of Lake Bosomtwe Road, Yaa Asantewa Road and Hudson Street. The mall sits on a total land area of 15.4 acres and has a gross lettable area of 18,500 square meters. The Kumasi City Mall has a total car parking capacity of over 1,000 bays on-grade and under the basement.

== See also ==
- List of Shopping Malls in Ghana
