= Kofi Byble =

Ghanaian musician

- Born: Evans Ofori Amoani; 31 July 1992 (age 33); Accra, Ghana
- Genres: Afrobeats; Dancehall
- Occupations: Rapper; Singer; Songwriter
- Instrument: Vocals
- Years active: 2006–present
- Label: Gheneral Empire (current).

Evans Ofori Amoani (born July 31, 1992), known by his stage name Kofi Byble is a Ghanaian songwriter and a recording artiste from Akuapem Mountains and based in Accra. He is currently under the management of cooppon entertainment, one of Ghana’s record labels.

Kofi Byble has over the years released songs ranging from genres like Afro Dancehall, Hiplife, Afrobeats and Hip hop. He is receiving attention now for his latest release "Baby Mama". He blends Twi with English to create his music. Kofi Byble has been described as an original talent with well-written lyrics and sharp timing in his delivery.

== Early life and career ==
Kofi Byble started the journey of his music career in the year 2006. His love for creative arts and music began in his second year in Junior High School. Byble met a radio DJ/Presenter, Doctor Duncan, who at the time was the host of Kasahari rap battle show on Adom FM. He attained the chance to feature on his show. Out of that same radio show came the likes of Sarkodie, Yaa pono, Stonebwoy, Guru and many other top artiste in Ghana. As a freestyle rapper on the show he never lost a battle to anyone, Kofi Byble then noticed he had a gift and had to continue with it professionally. Knowing the direction he was heading with his career, Kofi Byble worked day and night to stay relevant in the industry. He recorded his first studio record Sugar at his friend's studio in Accra and shot a music video for it which had radio and TV airplay across the country.

== "Baby Mama" and Gheneral Empire Records ==
In May 2018, Gheneral Empire Records, a new record label based in Accra, signed Kofi Byble. The signing took place at the studios of Gheneral empire on the Spintex Road in Accra. Gheneral Empire is owned by Mark Kwame Adjei, also known as Gheneral Poka or POKA1.

On 11 June 2018, Gheneral Empire Records released Kofi Byble's a standalone afrobeats single "Baby Mama". It was later released on top online digital stores like iTunes, Spotify, Tidal, Deezer, iHeart and is also on over 37 other online digital stores for Digital download and Streaming. "Baby Mama" was produced by Beat Boss Tims. The song is currently a nationwide anthem and can be used by users of both MTN and Vodafone network users in Ghana as their Caller Tune. MTN user subscribe by sending 668900 to short code 585 and Vodafone users, 4041508 to short code 585. Kofi Byble gave his fans the chance to win $500 in a Baby Mama Challenge where fans will submit videos of themselves dancing or singing the song on Instagram and Facebook.

== Discography ==
=== Selected singles ===
Year	Title	Producer(s)	Ref
2016	Sugar (featuring Ebo Likey)	Ratio Beatz	
2018	Baby Mama	Beat Boss Tims	

== Videography ==
Year	Title	Director	Ref
2016	Sugar	Pic Plus Films	
2018	Baby Mama	REX	
