= Flower Pot Interchange =

Road in Ghana

The Flower Pot Interchange is an elevated 802 metres (2,631 ft) dual carriageway in Ghana with an asphalt concrete surfacing. It consists of a 140-meter ramp from Shiashie onto the viaduct towards Airport Hills, and an 80-meter ramp connecting the viaduct to the Motorway towards Tema. It was constructed by the Chinese Railway Engineering and commissioned by President Nana Akufo-Addo on 19 November 2024. The project was originally allotted ¢69.5 million in 2016 and then a total of ¢147 million in 2017. When the project ended up costing more than ¢1 billion, some MPs questioned the expense. The Flower Pot Interchange is a significant infrastructure project in Accra, Ghana, designed to improve traffic flow between the northern and southern corridors of the Accra-Tema Motorway. It benefits commuters in areas such as Cantonments, Burma Camp, East Legon, Spintex, and Tema.

== History and Development ==
The project commenced on March 7, 2017, under the administration of President Nana Addo Dankwa Akufo-Addo, with the initial plan to construct a flyover to enhance traffic flow between the northern and southern regions of the Accra-Tema Motorway. Construction was undertaken by China Railway No. 5 Engineering Ghana Limited, with Deoke Consult Ltd serving as the consultant.

== Funding and Costs ==
The initial cost of the Flower Pot Interchange project was estimated at GH¢69.5 million when awarded in November 2016. In 2017, the cost was revised to GH¢147 million. By completion in 2024, the cost had escalated significantly, prompting concerns from the Minority in Parliament regarding the expenditure.

== Features and Specifications ==
The interchange comprises:

An 802-meter dual carriageway viaduct with asphaltic concrete surfacing, a 140-meter ramp from Shiashie onto the viaduct towards Airport Hills, An 80-meter ramp connecting the viaduct to the Motorway towards Tema, a new road through the old tunnel at East Legon, An additional 200 meters of road connecting Cantonments from the Giffard Road interchange, Pedestrian walkways on each side of the flyover, Road furniture such as streetlights, road markings, and traffic signals.

== Commissioning ==
The Flower Pot Interchange was officially commissioned by President Nana Addo Dankwa Akufo-Addo on November 19, 2024. The project aims to alleviate traffic congestion and improve connectivity between key areas in Accra.

== Controversies ==
The project faced scrutiny due to significant cost escalations. Initially awarded at GH¢69.5 million, the cost was revised to GH¢147 million in 2017 and escalated further by completion. The Minority in Parliament raised concerns, demanding explanations from the government regarding the expenditure.

== Future Maintenance and Developments ==
Post-commissioning, authorities have emphasized the importance of regular maintenance and preventing unauthorized structures around the interchange. President Akufo-Addo highlighted the interchange as a legacy for future generations, urging all stakeholders to ensure its longevity.
