= Liberation Road (Accra) =

Road in Accra, Ghana

- Airport City corridor
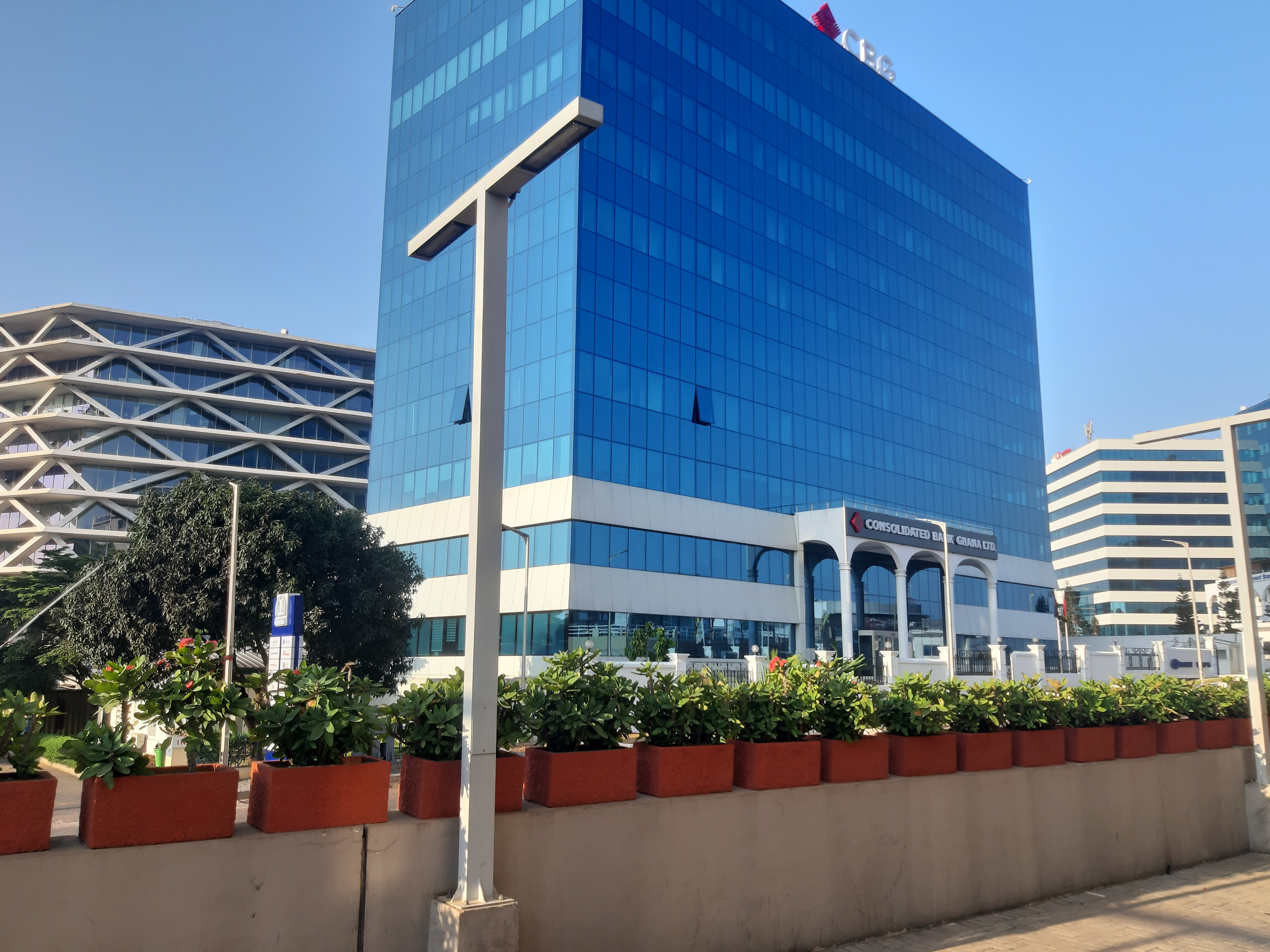
- Commercial development along Airport City, adjacent to Liberation Road
- Interactive map of Liberation Road
- Type: Major arterial road / airport corridor
- Owner: Accra Metropolitan Assembly
- Maintained by: Urban Roads Department (Ghana)
- Length: 3.2 km (2.0 mi)
- Location: Accra, Greater Accra Region, Ghana
- Quarter: Airport City, Airport Residential Area, Tetteh Quarshie/Spintex corridor
- Coordinates: 5.5929°N 0.1811°W
- North-west end: Accra International Airport / Airport City
- South-east end: Ring Road East / Tetteh Quarshie Interchange

Other
- Known for: Airport City, hotels, modern retail, business parks
- Status: Active

Liberation Road is an arterial corridor in Accra, Ghana, that links the area around Accra International Airport (including Airport City) with central Accra and major commercial nodes toward the Tetteh Quarshie Interchange and Spintex Road corridor. The route is characterised by business parks, hotels, retail outlets and facilities that serve both air travellers and a growing commercial district.

== History ==
Liberation Road was developed in the late 1950s and early 1960s during Ghana's post-independence urban modernization projects under President Kwame Nkrumah. It was designed as a ceremonial and functional link between the newly established Accra International Airport (then Accra Airport) and the city centre. The name "Liberation Road" reflects the national independence theme and was part of a wave of renamed infrastructure emphasizing freedom and progress.

== Route and overview ==
Liberation Road runs from the airport precinct and Airport City area southeast toward the Ring Road and connects with routes serving the Tetteh Quarshie Interchange and Spintex Road. The corridor provides direct access to hotels, corporate offices, shopping facilities and service industries located adjacent to Accra International Airport, making it a primary airport–business spine in Accra.

== Landmarks ==
Landmarks and facilities along or adjacent to Liberation Road include:

- Airport City Accra – a planned airport-centric commercial district developed by the Ghana Airports Company Limited (GACL), with hotels, offices and malls.
- Accra Mall – one of Ghana's largest shopping centres, located close to the corridor and connected via the Tetteh Quarshie roundabout.
- Afrikiko Gardens – a leisure and dining complex located near the road, known for live music and restaurants.
- Accra Marriott Hotel – located at Airport City, serving business travellers and visitors.

== Economy and function ==
The Liberation Road corridor functions as an airport business spine, hosting corporate offices, hotels, conference facilities, logistics companies, and service industries that rely on proximity to Accra International Airport. Real estate developments along the route have attracted both domestic and international investors seeking short-stay accommodation, office space and retail exposure near the airport.

== Transport and infrastructure ==
Liberation Road is a multi-lane arterial with direct connections to the airport bypass and the ring-road system. It is served by taxis and minibuses (trotros) and provides logistical access for airport freight and passenger transfers. Because it carries airport and commercial traffic, the corridor is a focus for traffic management and urban infrastructure planning in central Accra.

== Development and planning ==
Airport City and the Liberation Road corridor have seen steady private and public investment as part of Accra's broader aerotropolis strategy. The Ghana Airports Company Limited promotes Airport City as a business and hospitality hub to leverage the economic potential of the airport. Ongoing projects include mixed-use developments, hotels, office parks and extensions to road and drainage networks. Government road programmes have also identified Liberation Road for periodic upgrade and traffic-flow improvements.

== In popular and travel media ==
Liberation Road and Airport City appear frequently in travel guides and news coverage as part of Accra's modern airport precinct, often depicted in imagery of hotels, offices and the city skyline. Travel publications reference the corridor as one of the modern urban zones near Accra International Airport.

== Gallery ==
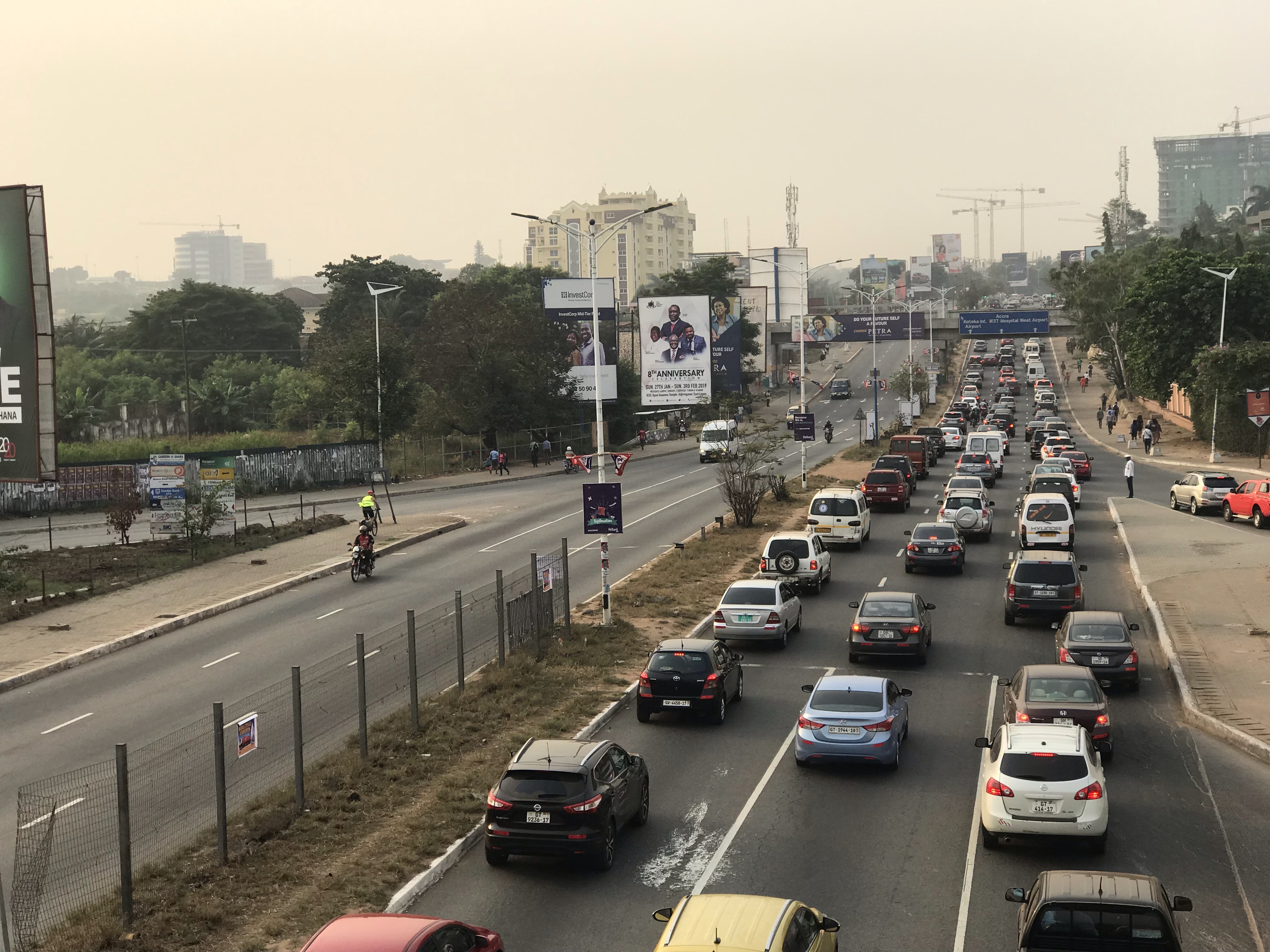
Road traffic on Liberation Road

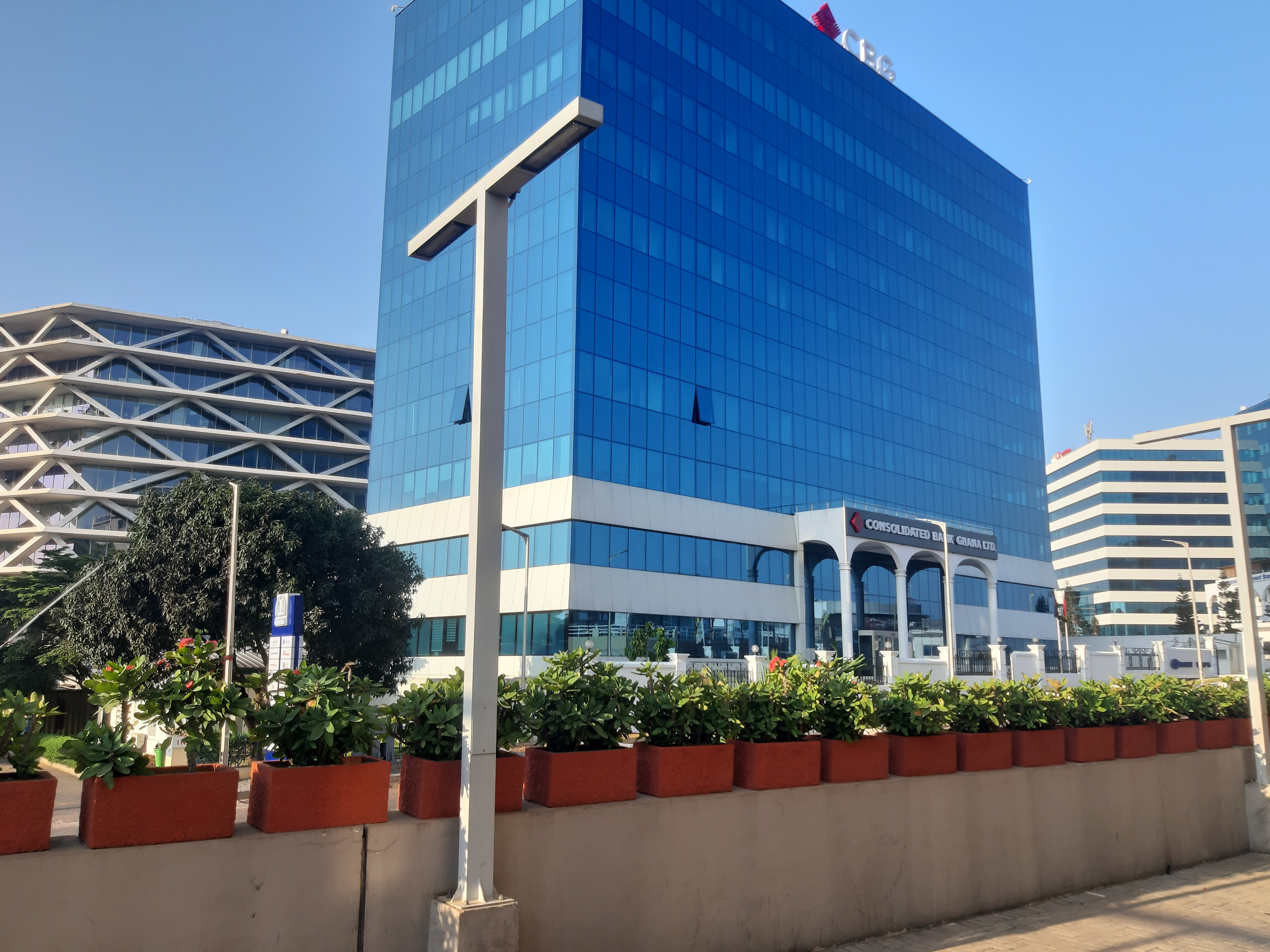
Airport City development adjacent to Liberation Road

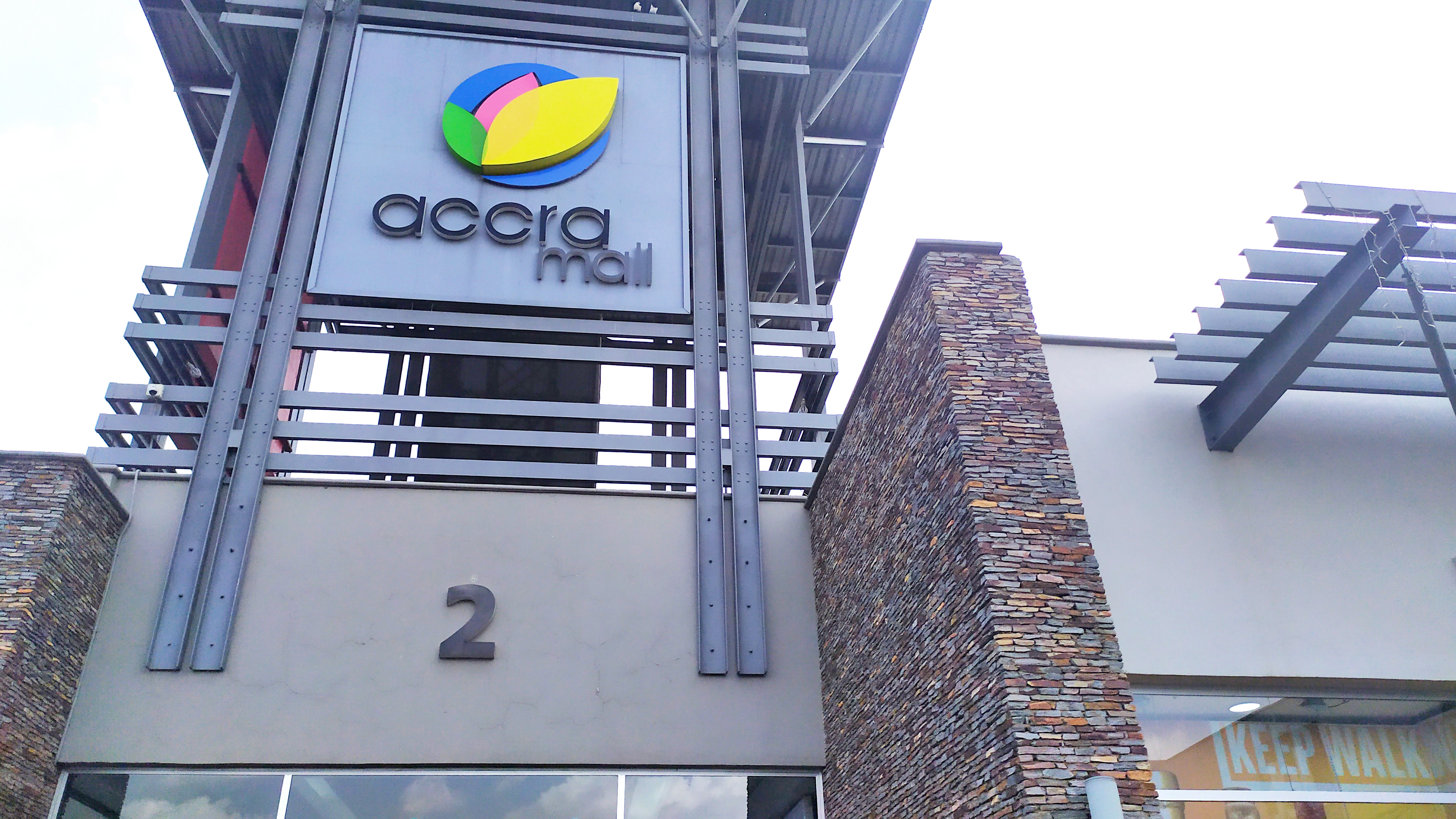
Accra Mall – major retail complex near Liberation Road

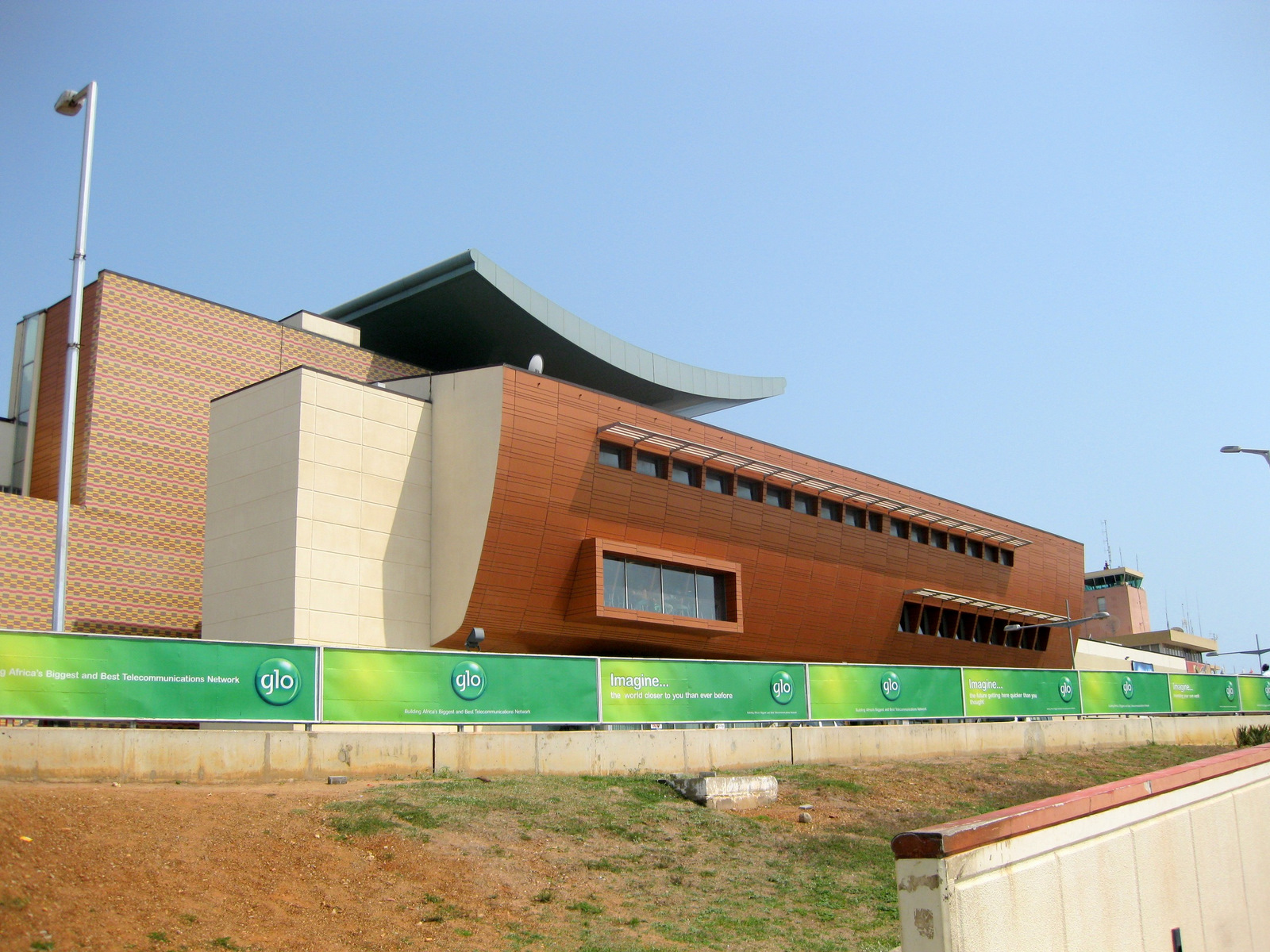
Accra International Airport terminal, serving the Liberation Road corridor

== See also ==
- Accra International Airport
- Airport City Accra
- Accra Mall
- Transport in Ghana
