= IHG =

IHG may refer to:

- International Horror Guild Award, presented by the International Horror Guild from 1995 to 2008
- International Hospitals Group
- InterContinental Hotels Group
