= Aboabo =

Residential area in Tamale, Ghana

- Suburb
- Location in Ghana
- Coordinates: 9.40132°N 0.84911°W
- Country: Ghana
- Region: Northern Region
- District: Tamale Metropolitan

Government
  - Type: Assembly Representative
  - Assemblyman: Yussif Nabhani (Ind.)
- Time zone: UTC+0 (GMT)
- Area code: NT-0005

Aboabo is a suburb of Tamale, Ghana, the capital of the Northern Region of Ghana.

== Geography and environment ==
Aboabo is located within the Tamale Metropolis, bordered by neighborhoods including Zogbeli, Saabonjida, and Poloyafong. Aboabo and Poloyafong share the same electoral area and are often considered a single community, although residential distinctions have led to their being viewed separately.

The suburb contains the Aboabo Forest Reserve.

== Economy and infrastructure ==
Aboabo hosts the Aboabo Market, where a variety of products are traded, especially local food.

== Social issues ==
Aboabo faces social challenges, including congestion, where major streets in the Central Business District, including those around Aboabo, have experienced severe congestion due to hawkers, beggars, and loitering individuals, complicating pedestrian and vehicular movement. Drug abuse is also a prevalent issue in Aboabo, particularly in the forest reserve and marketplaces. In response, a voluntary anti-drug taskforce, which aims to seize illegal drugs, has been established. This initiative is supported by Aboabo youth.

The taskforce was featured on a BBC documentary that exposed an Indian pharma firm fueling opioid crisis in Africa.

== Community development ==
In 2024, the Finance Minister of Ghana launched a 1.5 million GH₵ educational fund in the area to support students from the Aboabo and Zogbeli communities in accessing tertiary education.

== Notable places ==
- Tamale Central Market
- Aboabo Forest
- Metro Mass Transit Terminal
- Telecel Main Office

== Notable residents ==
- Mohammed Amin Adam – Former Finance Minister of Ghana, born and raised in Aboabo.
- Blakk Rasta – Ghanaian musician, spent part of his early life in Aboabo.
