= Alomo Bitters =

Ghanaian herbal based alcoholic drink

Alomo Bitters is a herbal based alcoholic drink produced in Ghana by Kasapreko. It is popular not only in Ghana but also in Nigeria, Togo, Ivory Coast South Africa and Burkina Faso. Its popularity has led to a lot of counterfeit production.

However, Kasapreko company took proactive measures to battle counterfeiting by introducing new bottles for the 200ml and 750ml sizes plus a tamper proof seal.
