= Tamale Central Market =

Market in Tamale, Ghana

The Tamale Central Market, in Tamale, Ghana, is the largest market in northern Ghana. The market offers a wide variety of goods, including traditional crafts, clothing, and local cuisine. There was an outbreak of fire in the market in 1979, and in 1982 the market was burnt down completely. Renovation was done by the then head of state Ft. Jerry Rawlings, and in 2015 by President John Mahama. The renovation was funded by the World Bank.The Tamale Metropolitan Assembly (TaMA) supervised the renovation.

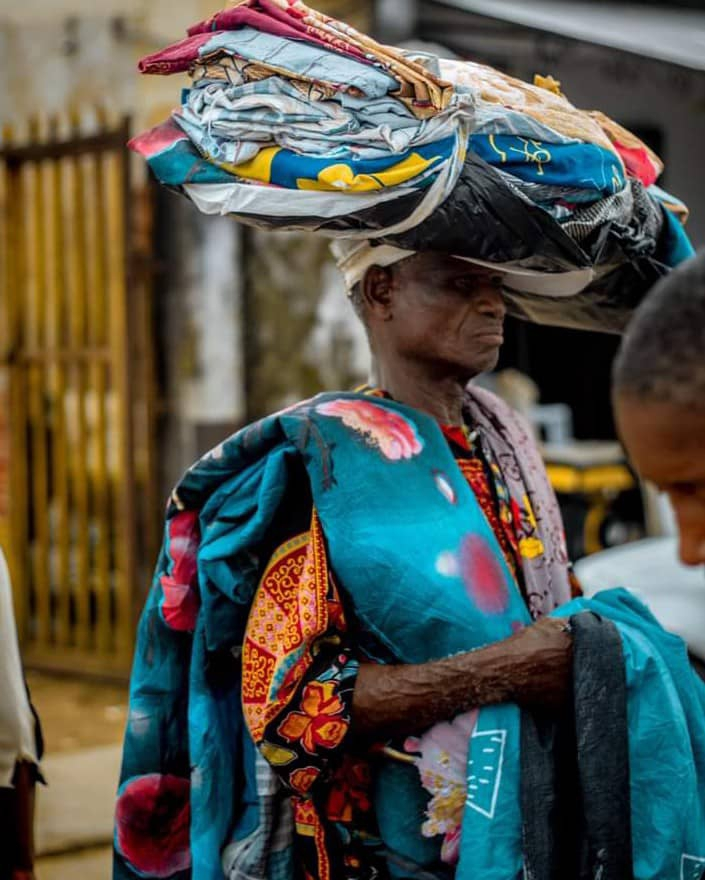
A vendor pictured in Central Market, Tamale.

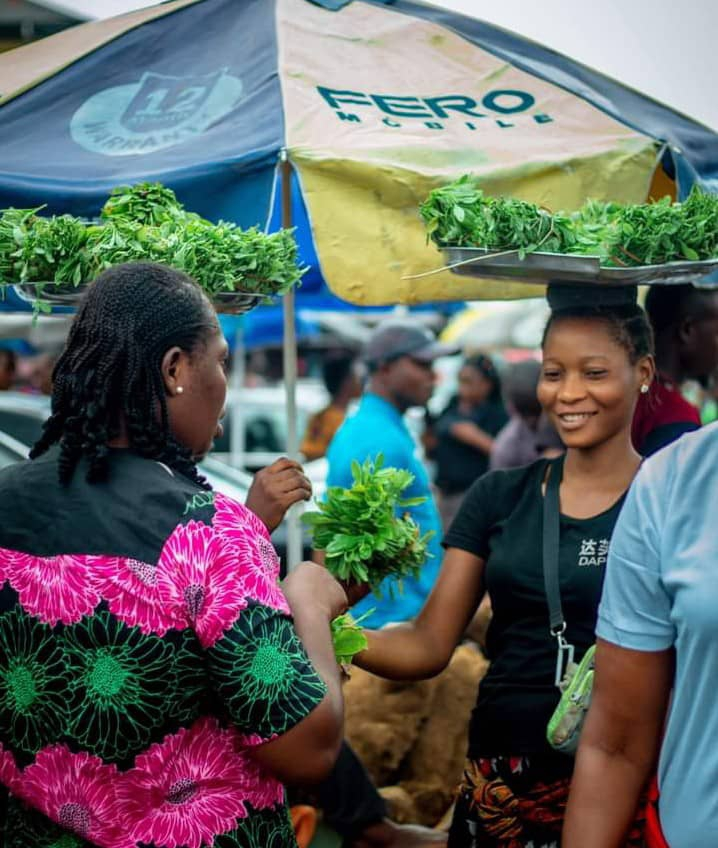
A trader in Central Market, Tamale.

It has two major sections, the Aboabo Market and the old market side (Dakurili).

== Aboabo Market ==
The Aboabo Market contains most of the wholesale and retail business transactions, and it is noted for the trading variety of products, especially local food products.

== Old Market Side (Dakurili) ==
This area hosts a variety of vendors selling traditional crafts, clothing, and other goods.

== Fire outbreaks/congestion ==
On September 9, 2022, a fire at the Tamale Central Market burned a few stores. Firefighters from the Ghana National Fire Service (GNFS) intervened to help contain the fire and stop it from spreading to other market stores.

== Recent conflicts ==
In January 2025, a violent clash over a land dispute within the market area resulted in injuries and disrupted trading activities.

== See also ==
- Markets in Ghana
