= Accra Mall =

Shopping mall in Ghana

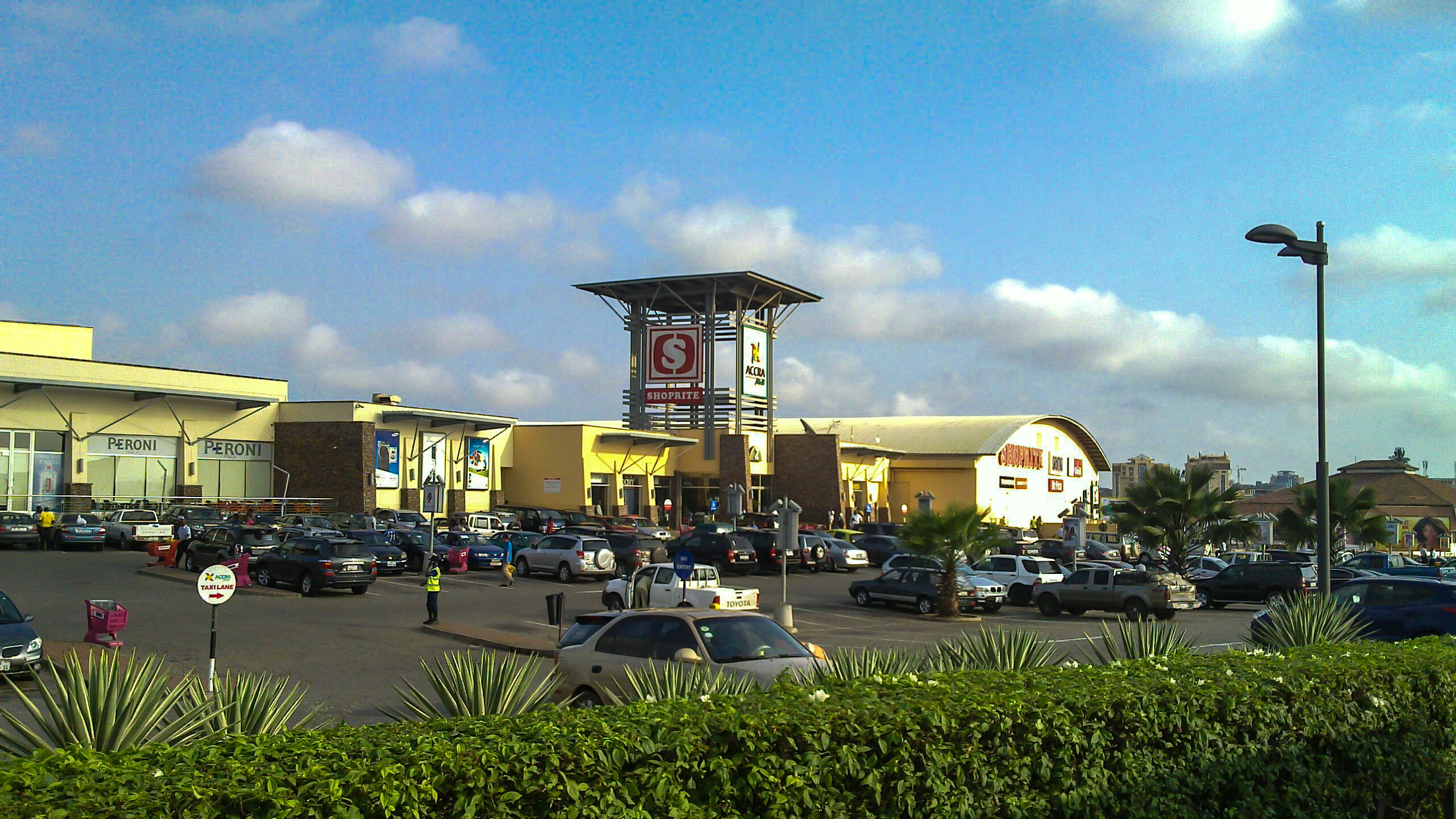
- View of Accra Mall in 2013
- Location: Spintex Road, Accra, Ghana
- Coordinates: 5.62217°N 0.17331°W
- Address: Plot C11, Tetteh Quarshie Interchange
- Opened: 4 July 2008; 18 years ago
- Owner: Atterbury Property Development, Sanlam, Owusu-Akyaw Family
- Num. of stores: 75
- Num. of anchor tenants: 2
- Floor area: 21,311 m^{2} (229,390 sq ft)
- Parking: 662 spaces
- Website: accramall.com

Accra Mall is a shopping mall in Accra, Ghana. It is located near the Tetteh Quarshie Interchange, adjacent to the Tema Motorway. Commissioned on 4 July 2008, It is the first fully enclosed mall to be built in the country.

It is owned by Atterbury Property Development, Sanlam and the Owusu-Akyaw family. As of 2017, approximately 7 million people visit the mall annually.

== History ==
The mall opened on 4 July 2008. Joseph Owusu-Akyaw, a Ghanaian private businessman and Actis, a British investment firm, secured funding for the mall's construction. The cost of the mall was approximately $36 million. In 2012, Actis share hold of the mall (85%) was bought by Sanlam Ltd. and Atterbury Investment Holdings Ltd.

== Facilities ==
There are 75 stores and one food court in the building, more than 30% of whom are Ghanaian-owned. Major brands located in the mall are Woolworths, Nike, Mango, and Apple. The 2 anchor stores in the mall are Shoprite and Game. The Accra Mall is home to Ghana's only multiplex.

== Incidents ==
In 2018, 3 people sustained minor injuries after parts of the mall's roof collapsed.

On 16 September 2025, Ghanaian activists united to demand the cancellation of the Israeli Film Festival which is to be held from this same date to 20 September 2025 at the mall.

== See also ==
- West Hills Mall
- List of shopping malls in Ghana
