= Achimota Retail Centre =

Shopping centre in Accra, Ghana

- Location: Achimota, Dome, Accra, Ghana
- Coordinates: 5°38′18.8″N 0°14′27.1″W
- Opened: 29 October 2015
- Owner: Delico Property Development Limited

The Achimota Retail Centre is a shopping centre located at Dome near the St. John's Grammar School, along the Accra—Nsawam Highway in the Greater Accra Region of Ghana. The shopping centre is owned by Delico Achimota Limited, the same group that is the majority shareholder of West Hills Mall.

== History ==
The construction of the mall began in April 2014 and was completed in October 2015 (exactly 18 months after). The edifice was opened to the public on 29 October 2015.

== Facility ==
The structure is a US$60 million investment which sits on a total land area of 35,790 m^{2} of which 14 622 m^{2} constitutes the trading space. It consists of over 45 shops including Shoprite and Palace.
