= Junction Mall Accra =

Shopping centre in Ghana

Junction Mall
- Location: Nungua, Accra, Ghana
- Opened: 27 November 2014
- Floor area: 11,597 m^{2} (124,830 sq ft)

Junction Mall is a premier shopping and entertainment landmark located in Nungua, Accra, serving the surrounding communities and the nearby Tema area. It is located in the Greater Accra Region of Ghana.

== History ==
The Mall was opened on 27 November 2014. It was developed by the South African firm RMB Westport. The mall has been managed and owned by Broll Ghana.

== Shops ==
=== Key Retailers ===
- (South Africa) Shoprite
- (France) Decathlon
- (South Africa) Mr Price
- (Ghana) Woodin Fashion
- CompuGhana
- (China) Hisense

=== Dining & Cafés (Key) ===
- (United States) KFC
- (Zimbabwe) Pizza Inn
- (Zimbabwe) Chicken Inn
- (South Africa) Barcelos
- (South Africa) Vida e Caffè
