= Makola Market =

Market place in Accra, Ghana

Coordinates: 5.547791°N 0.206863°W

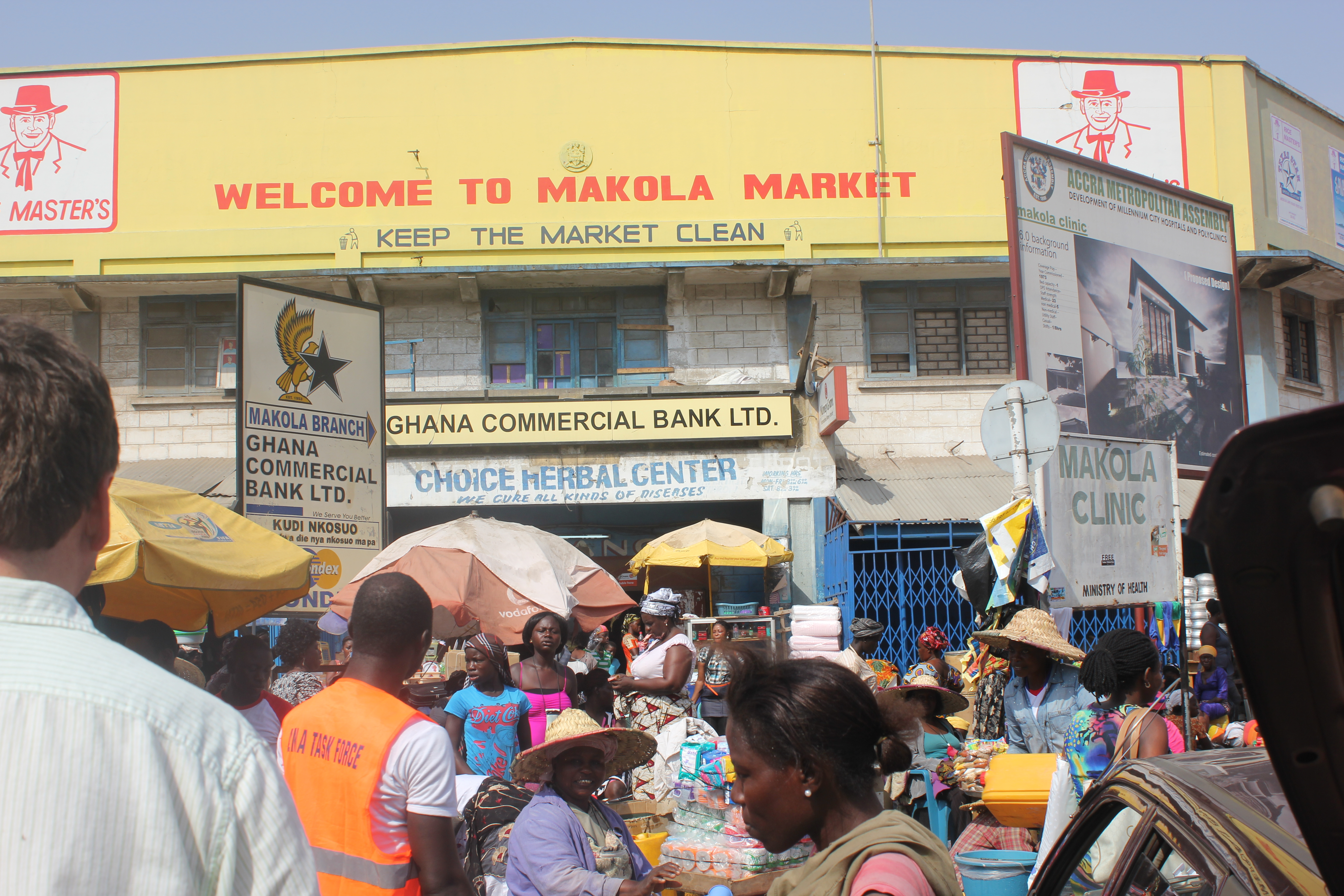
- Makola Market entrance
- Interactive map of Makola Market
- Location: Accra, Ghana

Makola Market is a market place and shopping district in the center of the city of Accra, the capital of Ghana. A wide array of products is sold in the markets and its surrounding streets, from car parts to land snails. Dominated by women traders, the market sells fresh produce, manufactured and imported foods, clothes, shoes, tools, medicines, and pots and pans. Jewellery made from locally handcrafted beads can also be found for sale in the market. About 25% of the 70% market women are employed in Makola Market. All type of school materials such as uniforms, pens books and stationery can also be bought there.

== Historical background ==
Makola Market was constructed in Accra in 1924 and stood at the heart of the urban Ghanaian life. The market was the main wholesale and retail marketplace in Accra, the epicenter of trade in the country and one of the nation's most important social and cultural institutions.

On 18 August 1979, 55 years after its creation, Makola Market was destroyed. The Rawlings government that agreed on the demolition of the centre of trade in Ghana thought that devastating Makola would improve the economy. Indeed, there were accusations that various products considered banned in Ghana were being sold in the Makola Market. In this way, the market women were accused of Ghana's economic problems.

Makola Market was featured in the Travel Channel show Anthony Bourdain: No Reservations with Anthony Bourdain in the Ghana episode. Bourdain walked through the market, where he sampled local wares and enjoyed a condensed milk-toffee drink made with local herbs.

== Recent development ==
At the "Ghana at 60" anniversary celebration in 2017, African print retailers in Makola Market threatened to boycott the sale of the official cloth used during the celebration due to its huge cost. The cloth was being sold at a price of 240 cedis for 12 yards (11 m). The anniversary logo on the cloth featured three people in an embrace, which signified the unity in diversity of Ghanaians.

== Controversies ==
In 2017 the Minister of Environment, Science, Technology and Innovation, Professor Kwabena Frimpong-Boateng, stated that some traders had resorted to using formalin, a cancer-causing agent, to preserve salted tilapia, commonly known as "koobi". The sellers dismissed the claim, saying that they were shocked to hear it. They stated that since the story broke, their sales had been affected since many people refused to purchase it.

== Gallery ==
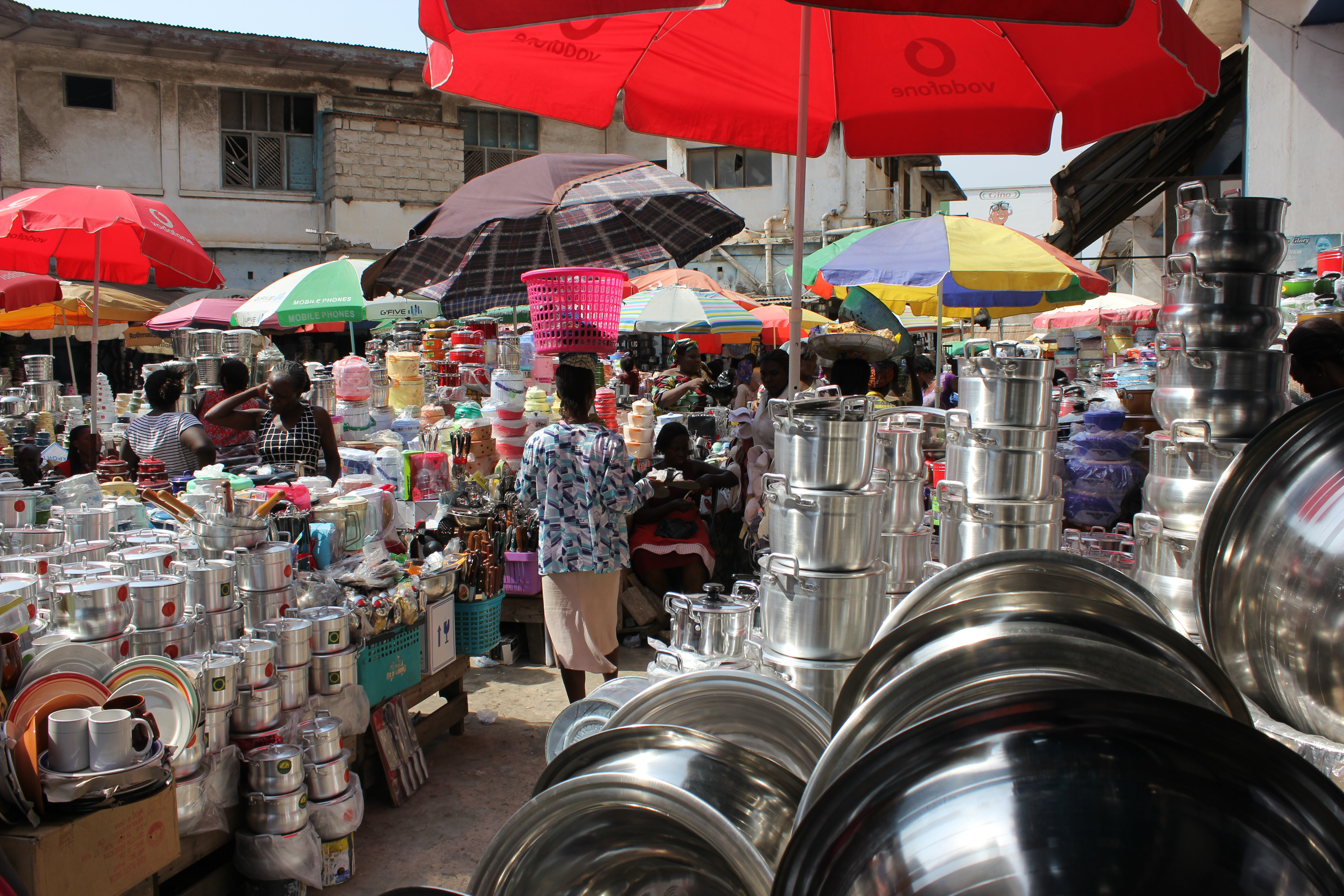
Pots Section, Makola Market, Accra, Ghana

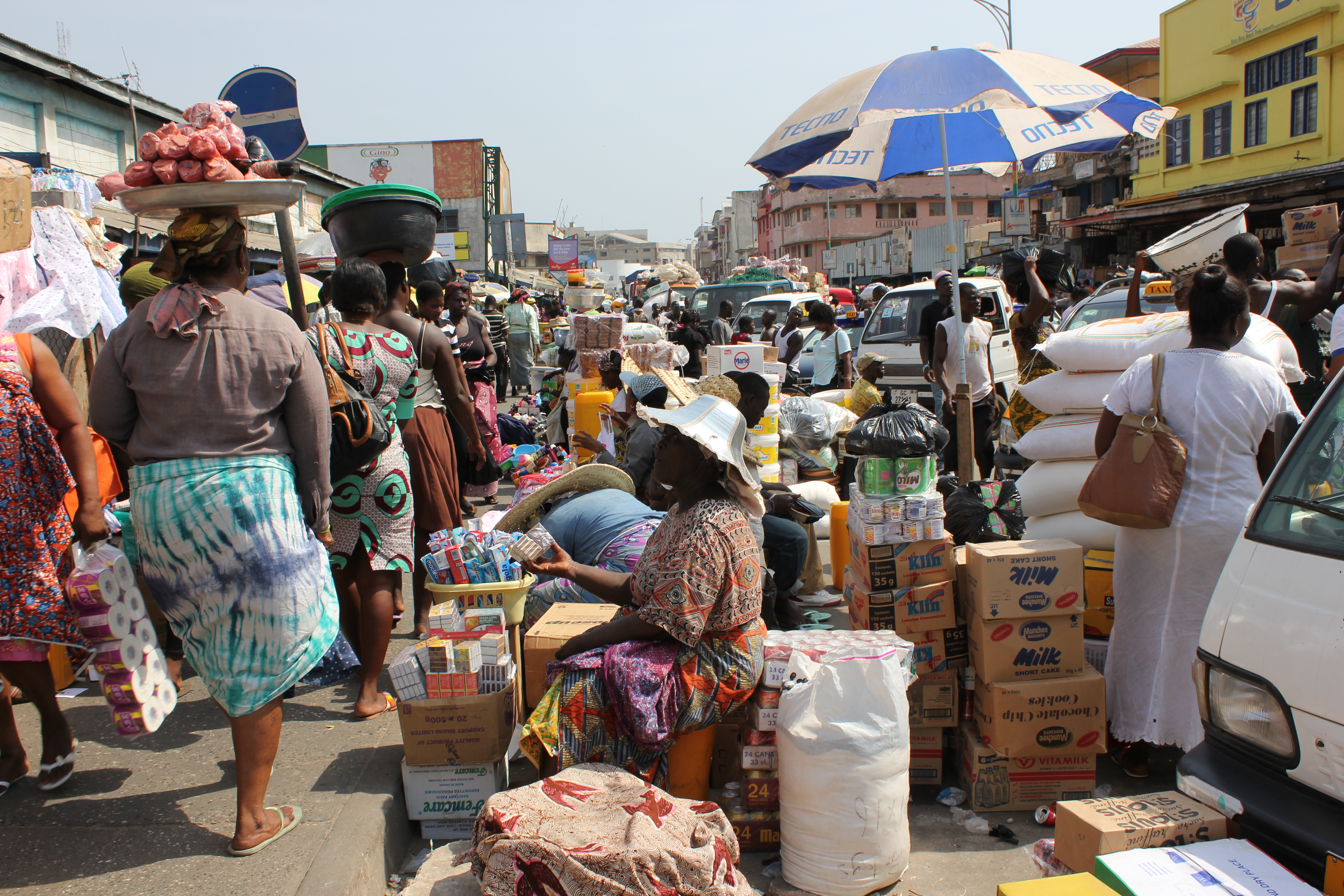
Street Outside Makola Market, Accra, Ghana

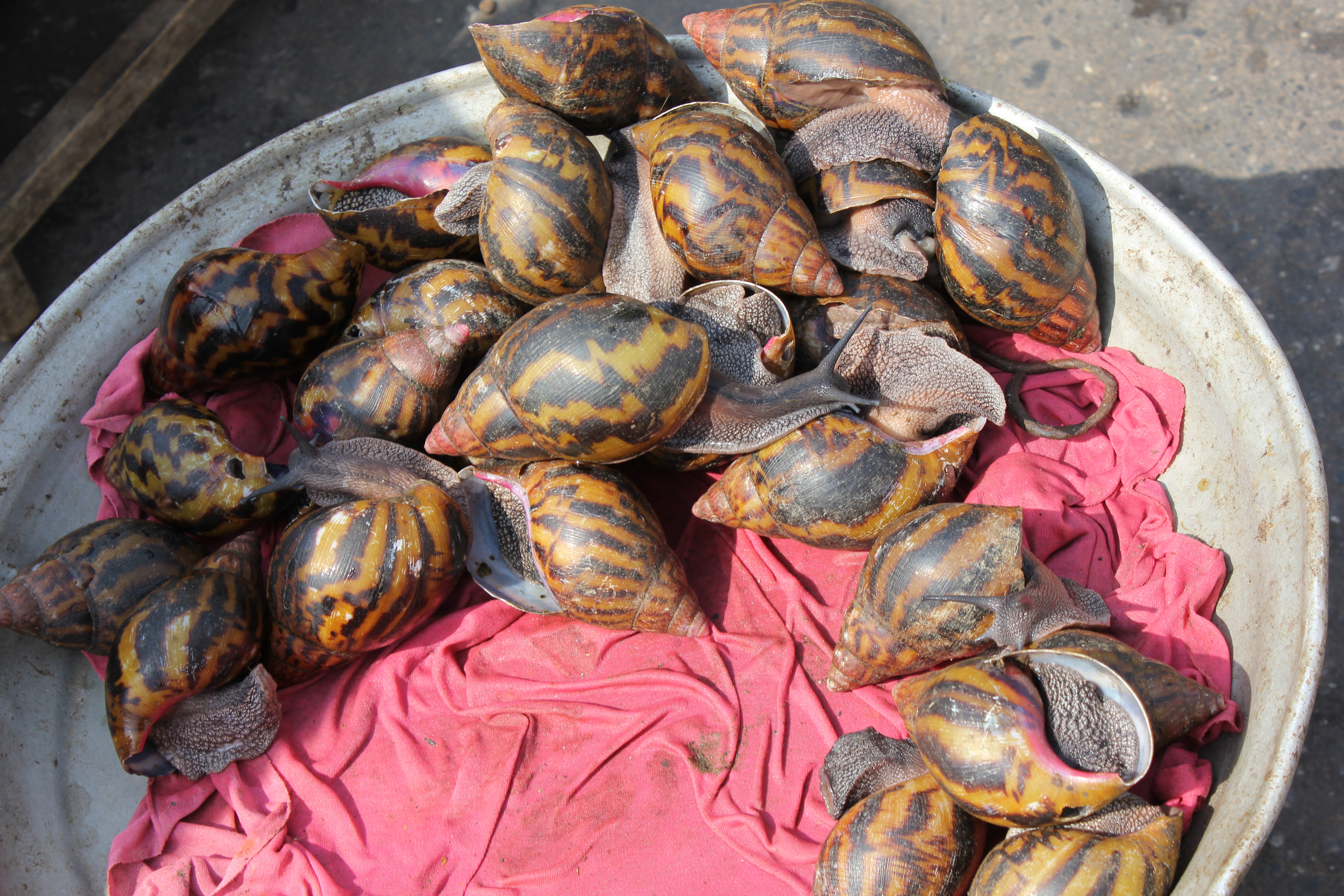
Snails, Makola Market, Accra, Ghana

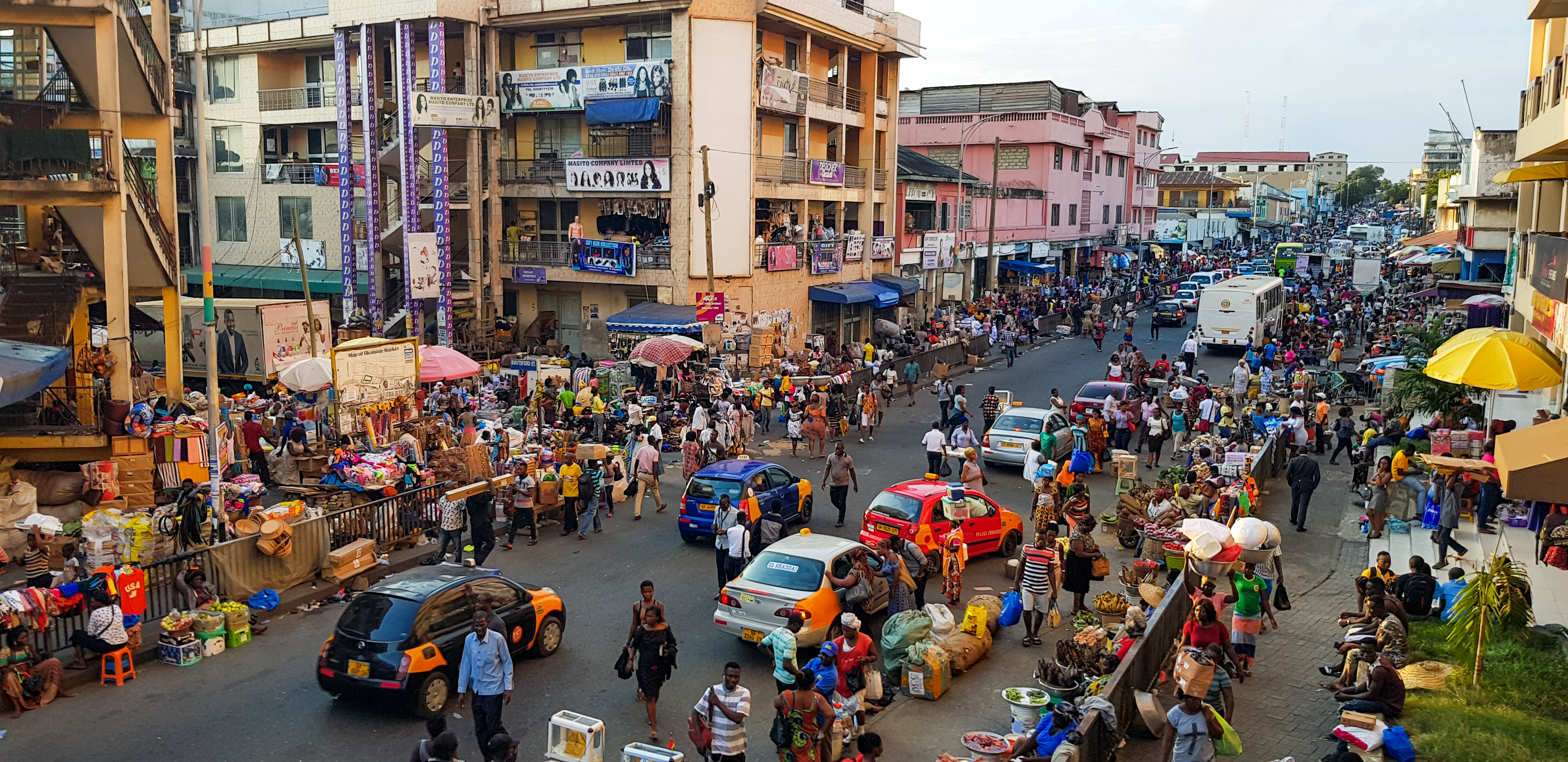
Busy Street in Accra Central near Makola Market.

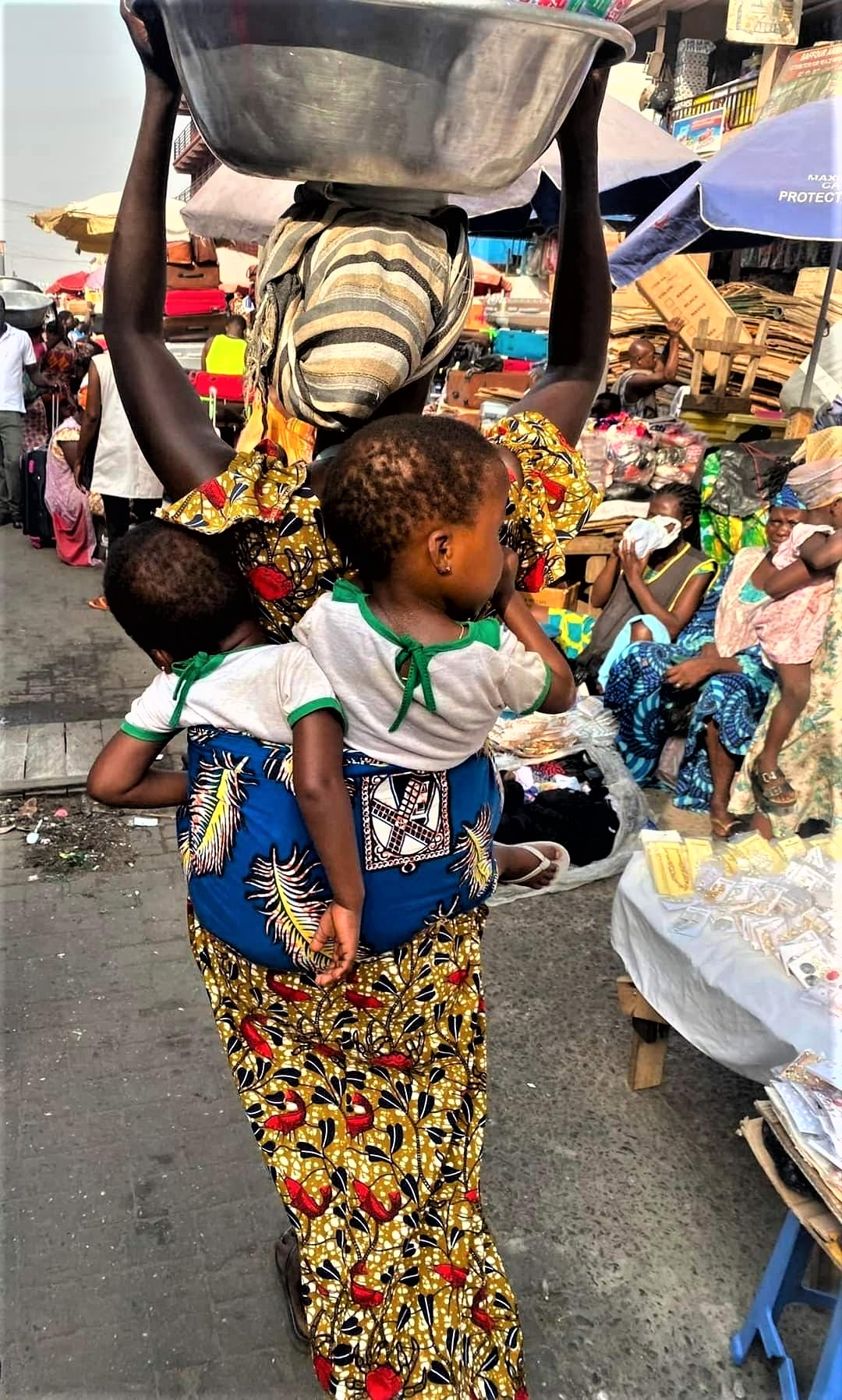
A woman selling water in Makola
