= Oxford Street Mall =

Shopping mall in Osu, Accra, Ghana

Oxford Street
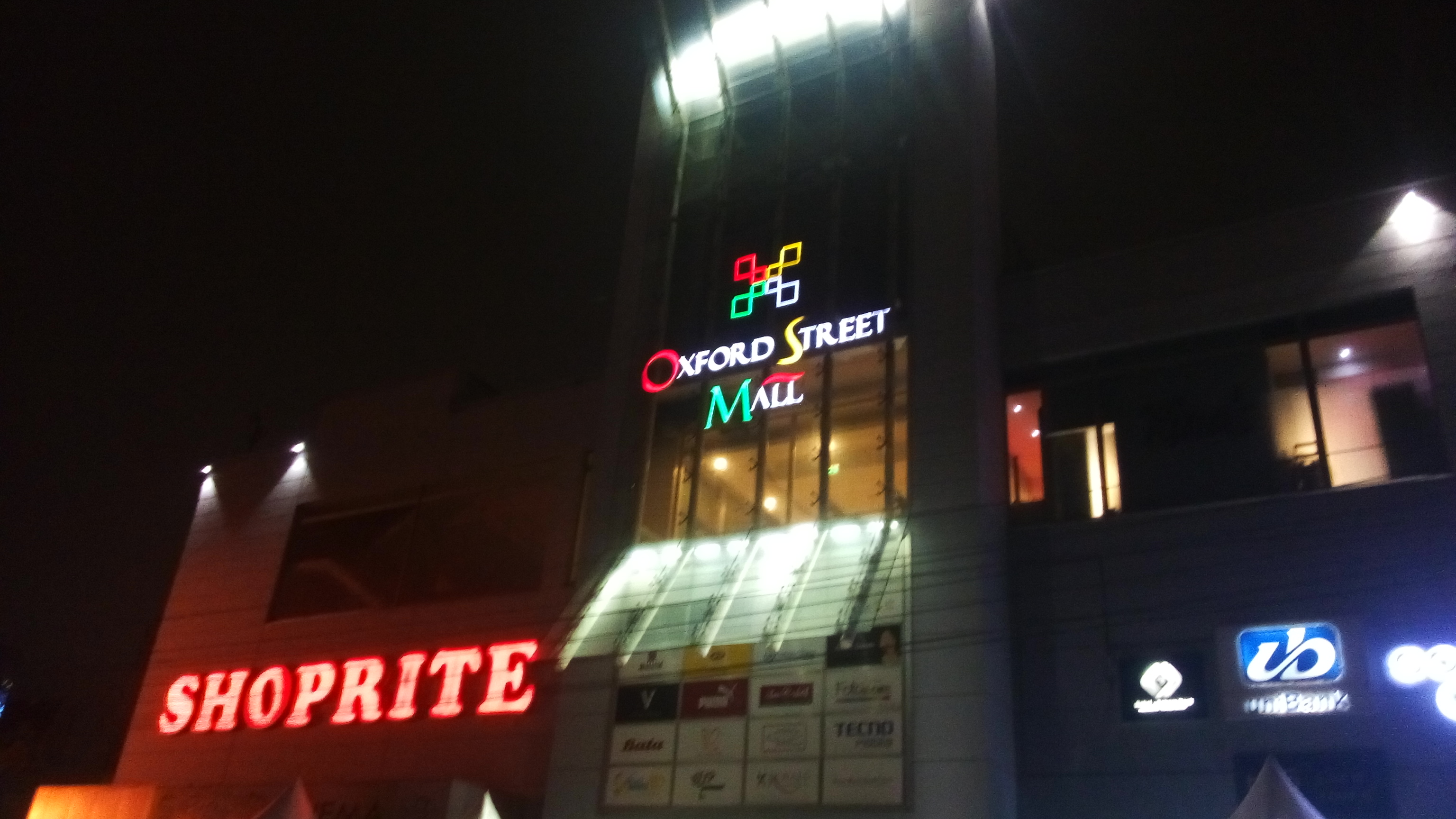
- Oxford Street Mall at night
- Location: Accra, Ghana
- Address: Osu neighborhood
- Owner: Ghana Libyan Arab Holding Limited (GLAHCO)
- Floors: 13

Oxford Street Mall is a shopping centre on Oxford Street in the Accra, Ghana neighborhood of Osu.

== Closure ==
The Mall was closed down by Accra Metropolitan Assembly for lack of requisite occupancy certificate. It was however opened for business.

== Facilities ==
The Mall has restaurants, anchor shops, cinemas, banks, casinos etc. Some its leading tenants include, MTN, Shoprite, Unibank etc. The Mall is yet to be fully completed with a 132-room hotel still under construction.
