= International Hospitals Group =

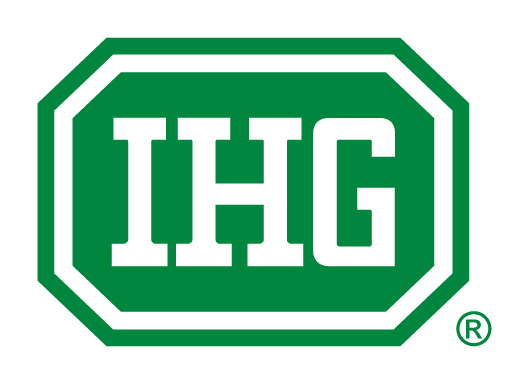
- Company type: Private Limited Company
- Industry: Healthcare and Construction Sector
- Founded: 1972
- Headquarters: Denham, Buckinghamshire, England
- Key people: Chester King, Chief Executive Officer
- Parent: International Group; Website
- Website: Official website

International Hospitals Group (IHG) is an international healthcare services company headquartered in Denham, Buckinghamshire. IHG's services include: on an individual or turnkey basis; healthcare consultancy, design, construction, medical equipping and operation and management of healthcare facilities, worldwide.

== Company Insight ==
Map detailing IHG's Global Projects

IHG, as an established British exporter, founded in 1972. IHG has completed over 480 healthcare projects in 55 countries with clients including; the United Nations, the World Bank, the International Finance Corporation and over 24 governments.

== Areas of activity ==
- Feasibility Studies and Advisory Services
- Functional Planning and Design
- Construction and Project Management
- Medical Equipping
- Commissioning Services
- Operational Management and Training
- Accreditation and Quality Assurance Programmes
