= Marina Mall Accra =

Marina Mall
- Location: Airport City Accra, Accra, Ghana
- Coordinates: 5°36′10.8576″N 0°10′34.0226″W
- Developer: Marina Market
- Num. of stores: 45
- Floor area: 3,250 m^{2} (35,000 sq ft)
- Floors: 6

Marina Mall Accra is a shopping center located at Airport City Accra in the Greater Accra Region of Ghana
