= Cantonments, Accra =

Suburb of Accra, Ghana

Cantonments
- Suburban Area
- Location within Ghana
- Coordinates: 5°35′10″N 0°10′35″W
- Country: Ghana
- Region: Greater Accra Region
- District: Accra Metropolis District
- Elevation: 315 ft (96 m)
- Time zone: GMT
  - Summer (DST): GMT

Cantonments is an affluent suburb of the Ghanaian city Accra, in the La Dade Kotopon Municipal District, a district in the Greater Accra Region of Ghana.

== Overview ==
The Cantonments area was intended to become a military quarters under the British Colonial government, in the Gold Coast, now Ghana.

However, it was upgraded to become a more modern planned residential settlement. Most of the households in the area have three to four bedrooms and are often occupied by the wealthy, academic officials, or government officials.

Many diplomatic missions in the country are in this suburb, including the U.S. Embassy in Accra.

The Flower Pot interchange was constructed to ease traffic to the area.

== Healthcare ==
The Cantonments Hospital, Police Hospital and the Health care center & Clinic of Cantonments are the healthcare institutions that are situated in Cantonments.

== Schools ==
The following schools are located in Cantonments, Accra.

- New Horizon Special School
- National Film and Television Institute (NAFTI)
- Ghana International School
- St. Thomas Aquinas Senior High School
- The Morning Star School
- Christ the King International School
