= Oxford Street, Osu =

Major street in the City of Accra

Oxford Street
- Osu Oxford Street
- Interactive map of Oxford Street
- Former name: Oxford Avenue
- Namesake: Possibly named after Oxford Street, London
- Type: Main Street
- Owner: Accra Metropolitan Assembly
- Maintained by: Accra Metropolitan Assembly
- Length: 2.4 km (1.5 mi)
- Area: Osu commercial district
- Location: Osu, Accra, Greater Accra Region, Ghana
- Quarter: Osu Klottey
- Postal code: GA-029-XXXX
- Coordinates: 5.5604°N 0.1840°W
- North end: Independence Avenue
- South end: Labadi Road

Construction
- Construction start: 1980s
- Completed: early 1990s
- Inauguration: 1990s

Other
- Designer: Accra City Planning Department
- Known for: Shopping, nightlife, restaurants, and tourism
- Status: Active

Oxford Street is a major commercial and entertainment avenue located in the Osu district of Accra, the capital of Ghana. Often described as the "heart of Osu", the street is famous for its vibrant nightlife, restaurants, boutiques, banks, and open-air craft markets, making it one of Accra's busiest and most cosmopolitan areas.

Oxford Street stretches from the Ring Road towards Independence Avenue, cutting through the core of Osu. The area is lined with a dense mix of retail outlets, hotels, restaurants, and cafes. It is sometimes compared to London's Oxford Street because of its mix of local and international businesses and its bustling pedestrian activity.

== History ==
Originally a quiet residential area, Osu developed into a commercial and entertainment district in the 1990s and early 2000s. The term "Oxford Street" is colloquial, inspired by the famous shopping street in London, symbolizing modernization and urban vibrancy in Accra.

== Economy ==
Oxford Street stands as one of Accra's economic corridors, hosting a diverse mix of commercial activities that drive both local and visitor engagement. The street features a wide array of retail stores, fashion boutiques, and electronics outlets, alongside restaurants, cafés, and fast-food chains. Financial institutions such as banks, forex bureaus, and telecom service centers line the avenue, while street vendors and artisans add up through the sale of traditional Ghanaian crafts and souvenirs.

== Landmarks ==
Landmarks and businesses along Oxford Street include:

- Oxford Street Mall – a modern multi-level shopping complex
- Papaye Fast Food headquarters – one of Ghana's most popular fast-food chains
- Frankie's Hotel and Restaurant – a landmark hospitality venue since the 1990s
- Koala Shopping Center – known for imported goods and groceries
- The African Craft Market – popular for beads, textiles, and souvenirs
- Multiple banks such as Fidelity Bank and CalBank
- Nearby attractions like Osu Castle and Danquah Circle

== Transport and accessibility ==
Oxford Street is accessible through key roads including Ring Road Central and Independence Avenue. Public transportation options such as taxis and trotros (shared minibuses) operate along the corridor, connecting Osu with Cantonments, Labone, and Circle.

Due to the high concentration of commercial activity, traffic congestion is common, particularly at night and weekends. Urban planners have suggested partial pedestrianization and improved zoning to reduce vehicular pressure and enhance walkability.

== Challenges ==
Oxford Street, though one of Accra's liveliest areas, faces several urban challenges. Frequent traffic congestion results from limited parking and roadside vending, while nightlife and informal trading contribute to noise and sanitation issues. The street's narrow sidewalks and aging drainage also strain infrastructure, highlighting the need to balance informal commerce with modern urban redevelopment.

== In popular culture ==
Oxford Street is frequently depicted in Ghanaian films, music videos, and documentaries as a symbol of Accra's cosmopolitan lifestyle and nightlife. It is often referred to as “the street that never sleeps.

== Culture and nightlife ==
Oxford Street is known for its nightlife and cosmopolitan atmosphere. It is one of Accra's main entertainment districts, frequented by both residents and international visitors. The street contains a concentration of bars, pubs, and lounges, including Carbon Nightclub, Republic Bar & Grill, and Firefly Lounge Bar, which are popular venues for live music, social gatherings, and themed events.

Street performances and outdoor events are occasionally organised during weekends and festive periods, contributing to the area's active social scene. The street is also used for cultural parades, concerts, and public celebrations, especially during national holidays and the Christmas season.

== See also ==
- Osu, Accra
- Accra
- Economy of Ghana
- Tourism in Ghana
