= Airport City Accra =

Urban development in Ghana

Coordinates: 5.5987522°N 0.17681047°W

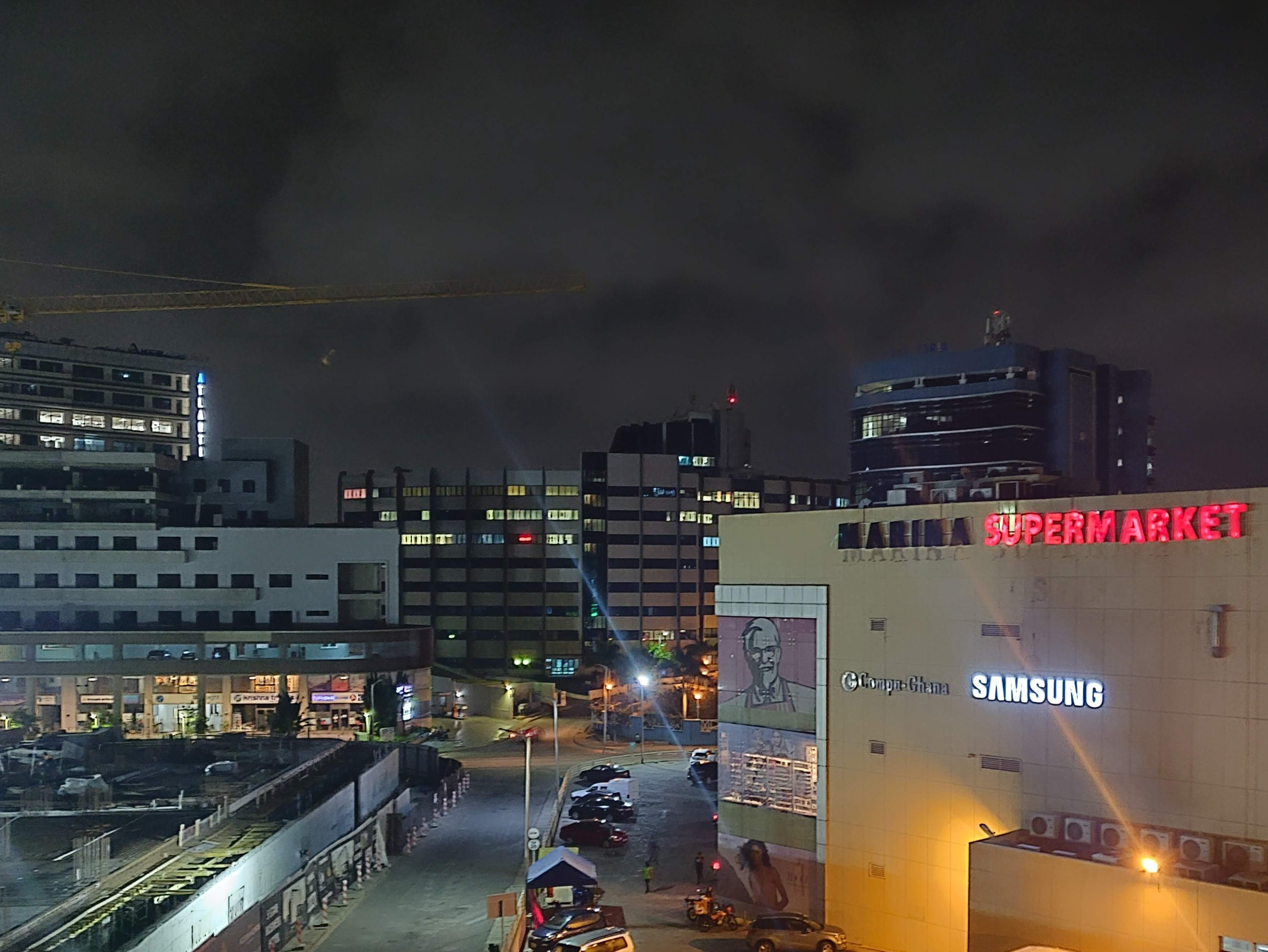
Airport City enclave in Accra at night in 2020

Airport City Accra is an urban development within the airport enclave of Accra, centered around Kotoka International Airport.

The development is promoted by Ghana Airports Company Limited on the principle that airports have ceased to be mere terminals, but rather economic growth outlets to promote trade and generate employment.

Developments within Airport City include retail outlets such as Marina Mall, hotels such as Accra Marriott Hotel, ibis Styles Accra and Holiday Inn Accra Airport, as well as corporate offices for companies such as Africa World Airlines and Vodafone Ghana. Projects underway include the five-star Pullman Accra Airport City by Accor and the Protea Hotel by Marriott Accra Airport.

International airlines such as American Airlines, Brussels Airlines and Turkish Airlines also have their ticketing and sales offices located within Airport City.

Airport City is expected to host multiple stations on the proposed Accra SkyTrain system.
