= Kwame Nkrumah Interchange =

Interchange in Ghana

- Kwame Nkrumah Circle
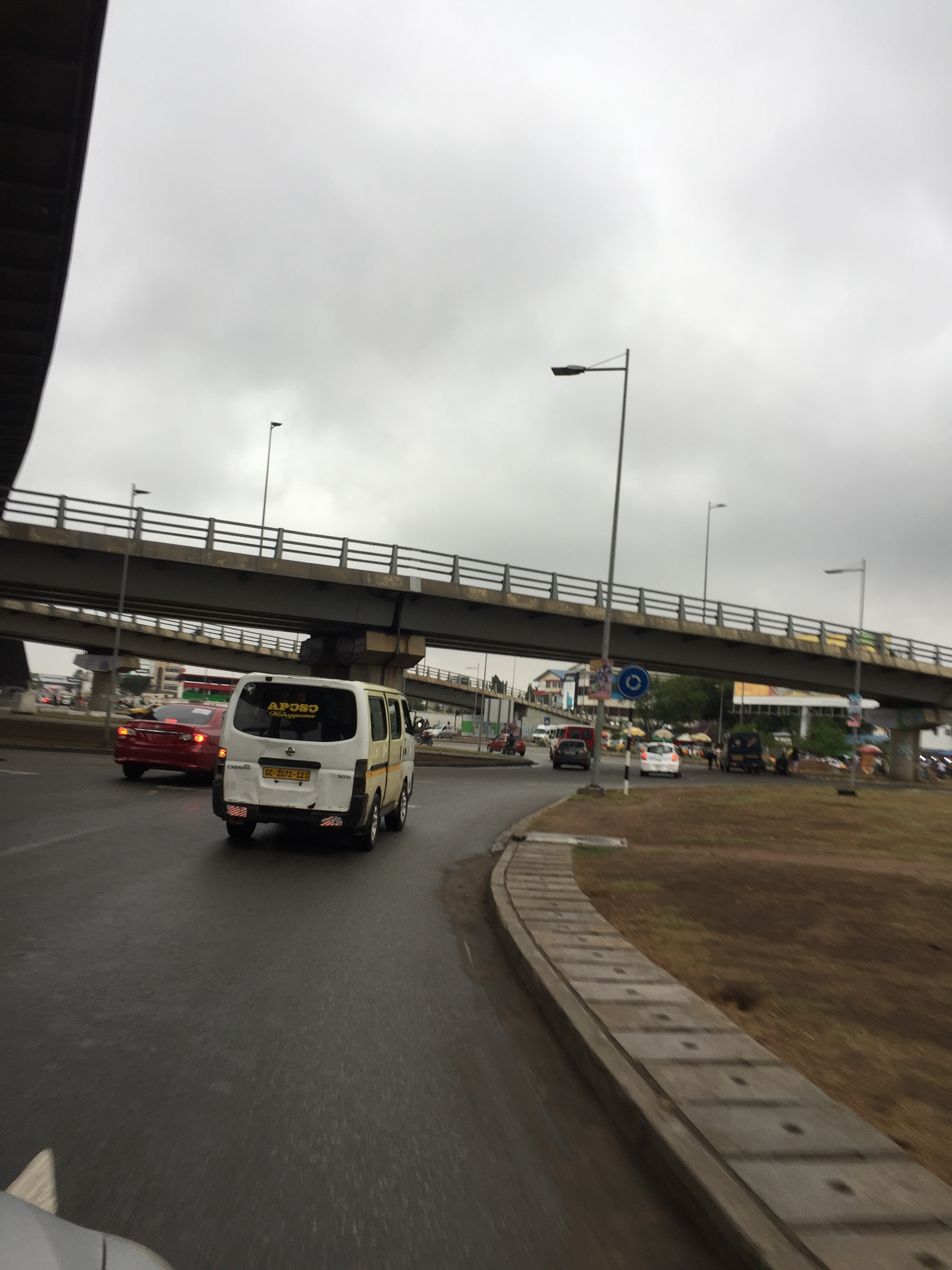
- Interactive map of Kwame Nkrumah Interchange

Location
- Accra, Ghana
- Coordinates: 5°34′10″N 0°12′55″W

Construction
- Type: 3 tier interchange

Kwame Nkrumah Interchange is a 3-tier interchange which was constructed to replace the Kwame Nkrumah Circle in the centre of the city of Accra, Ghana. It opened in 2016. The interchange is named in honour of Ghana's first president, Kwame Nkrumah, who was the leading figure during the country's fight for independence from Britain. Both the current and the old edifices remain landmarks of Ghana's capital city, Accra.

== History ==
The construction of the interchange became necessary when the Kwame Nkrumah Circle, which handles over 84,000 vehicles from the arterial roads and their intersections daily. The current roads could no longer ensure effective and efficient tackling of the traffic congestion challenges.

On 3 June 2015, a GOIL fuel station near the interchange exploded killing at least 150 people. The disaster was exacerbated by floodwaters which caused the fuel to spread as it floated and burned, killing additional people.

== Flooding ==
On Monday 29th of June,2026 areas around the Kwame Nkrumah Circle Interchange got flooded. The flooding caused a halt in both commercial and educational activities.

== Gallery ==
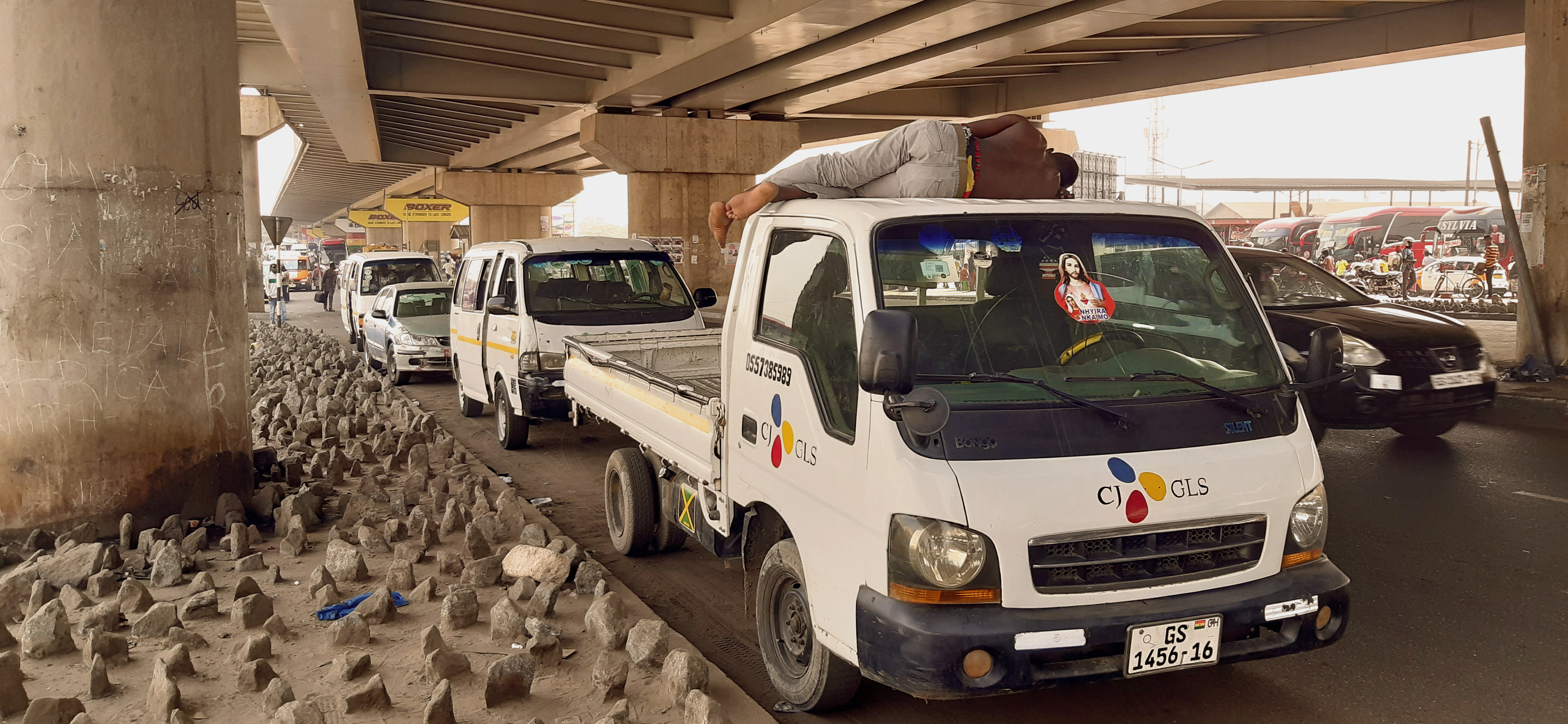
White truck under the interchange
