= Spintex Road =

Major road and commercial corridor in Accra, Ghana

- Spintex Highway
- Interactive map of Spintex Road
- Type: Highway
- Owner: Department of Urban Roads (Ghana)
- Maintained by: Accra Metropolitan Assembly
- Length: 14 km (8.7 mi)
- Location: Accra, Greater Accra Region, Ghana
- Quarter: Baatsona, Lashibi, Manet
- Postal code: GA-100-XXXX
- Coordinates: 5.637°N 0.082°W
- West end: Tetteh Quarshie Interchange
- East end: Tema Motorway Roundabout

Construction
- Construction start: late 1980s
- Completion: early 1990s

Other
- Designer: Ghana Urban Roads Department
- Known for: Shopping, light industry, residential estates, and traffic congestion
- Status: Active

Spintex Road is a major road and commercial corridor in Accra, the capital of Ghana. The road stretches from the Tetteh Quarshie Interchange in the west to the Tema Motorway Roundabout in the east, running parallel to the Tema Motorway. It passes through residential and industrial areas such as Baatsona, Lashibi, and Manet.

Spintex Road serves as a commercial and residential corridor connecting Accra's city center with the industrial zones near Tema. The name "Spintex" originates from the textile company Spintex Limited, which established operations along the route in the 1980s. Over time, the name came to represent the entire stretch of road and surrounding communities.

The road has evolved into one of Accra's main business corridors, hosting offices, shopping malls, banks, restaurants, and manufacturing facilities. It is also home to several gated communities and residential estates catering to middle- and upper-income residents.

== History ==
Spintex Road was developed in the late 1980s as part of Accra's urban expansion plan to decongest the central business district and open up new residential and industrial zones. Its proximity to the Tema Motorway made it an ideal site for light industry, warehousing, and logistics. By the early 2000s, it had become one of the fastest-growing commercial corridors in the Greater Accra Region.

== Economy ==
Spintex Road is a hub of economic activity featuring a mix of retail, manufacturing, and services. Businesses along the road include furniture and car dealerships, electronics shops, fashion boutiques, and corporate offices. Industrial zones along the eastern stretch host warehouses and light factories serving both the Accra and Tema markets.

Notable commercial centers and landmarks include:

- Palace Mall – a major shopping destination for home and lifestyle products
- China Mall Accra – one of Ghana's largest discount retail centers
- Flower Pot Interchange – a grade-separated intersection reducing congestion
- KFC, Papaye Fast Food, and other restaurant chains
- Ecobank, Fidelity Bank, and Access Bank branches

== Transport ==
Spintex Road connects to key highways including the Tema Motorway, Accra–Tema Beach Road, and Ring Road Central. It is served by multiple public transport options including taxis and trotros (minibuses) that link communities such as Cantonments, Teshie, and Tema.

The completion of the Flower Pot Interchange in 2024 improved traffic flow and pedestrian safety at one of the city's busiest junctions. However, congestion remains a significant challenge during peak hours due to rapid urbanization and limited parking facilities.

== Urban development ==
Residential estates such as Manet Court, Regimanuel Estates, and Baatsona Spintex Estates have developed along the corridor, offering modern housing and gated communities. The area has also attracted educational institutions, international schools, and churches including Action Chapel International, one of Ghana's largest congregations.

The Accra Metropolitan Assembly has announced plans to introduce better drainage, improved pedestrian infrastructure, and bus rapid transit (BRT) lanes to ease mobility and flooding issues.

== In popular culture ==
Spintex Road frequently appears in Ghanaian media and Afrobeats music as a symbol of urban growth and modern lifestyle. The phrase “Spintex lifestyle” is sometimes used to describe upwardly mobile young professionals living or working along the corridor.

== See also ==
- Oxford Street, Osu
- Tema Motorway
- Accra
- Transport in Ghana
