= Tema Motorway =

Road in Ghana

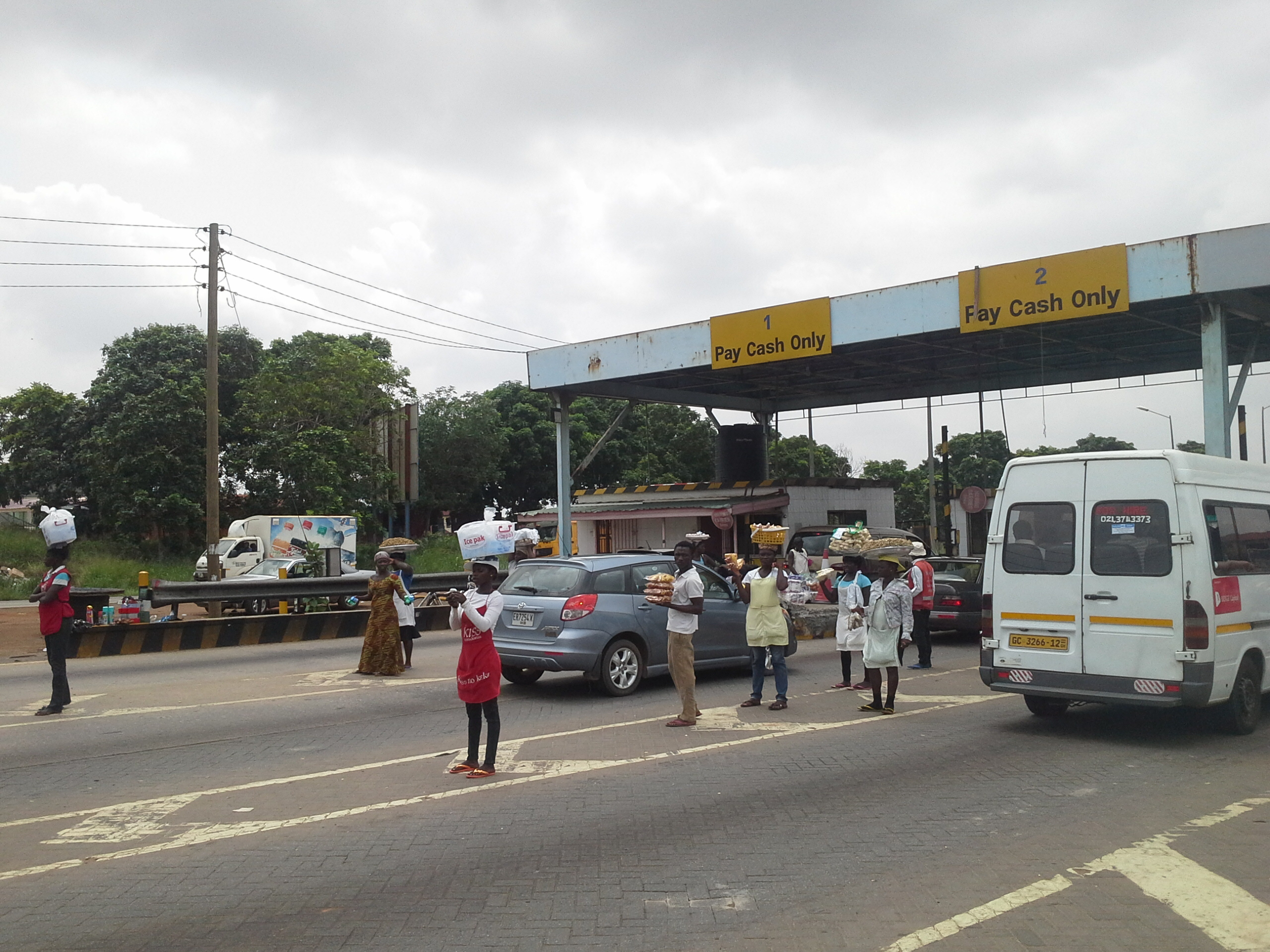
Tollbooth and hawkers on Tema - Accra motorway

The Tema Motorway officially known as the N1 Highway is a 19-kilometre (12 mi) highway that links Tema to Accra—capital of Ghana. It is the only motorway in Ghana., is a major highway in Ghana that connects the capital city of Accra with the industrial city of Tema.

== History ==
The highway was opened to traffic in November 1965 to link the harbour city of Tema to Accra. It was built under the administration of Kwame Nkrumah, the first president of Ghana. Its construction was fashioned after the Autobahn in Germany and was purposed to be the first in motorway systems that would link major towns and cities in Ghana.

== Streetlights ==
A major problem that existed on the motorway and still exists is the lack of street lights. The motorway had no streetlights when it was completed in 1964. In June 2002, the Ghana News Agency reported that the Government of Ghana was to spend 1.95 million cedis to light up the motorway. The project was to commemorate the country's Golden Jubilee in 2007. The project had challenges that delayed its completion of the Accra–Tema Motorway. It was suspended due to cable thefts. The problem led to plain-clothed policemen patrolling the motorway. Unfortunately, not all of the mounted streetlights on the motorway are functional.

== Motorway campaigns ==
In 2009, Adom FM, an Accra-based private radio station embarked on a campaign to educate users of the motorway on dangers that faced commuters on the multi-purpose highway. The education included the rampant criminal activities on the motorway, the unsafe bridges, the potholes, stolen side-rails, malfunctioning streetlights, lack of reflectors, broken-down vehicles, and road safety.

== Rehabilitation of the motorway ==
In August, 2009, rehabilitation work began on the road and was to cost 500,000 cedis. Part of the motorway was to be reconstructed using epoxy cement. The rehabilitation work took eight weeks and involved the removal and replacement of the concrete slabs which had developed potholes and the repair of the asphalt surface on shoulders of the road.
