= West Hills Mall =

Shopping centre in Ghana

West Hills
- Location: Dukonah, Accra, Ghana
- Coordinates: 5°32′45″N 0°20′34″W
- Opened: 30 October 2014
- Developer: WBHO
- Owner: Delico Property Development Limited and SSNIT
- Architect: Auguistus Richardson
- Num. of stores: 67
- Floor area: 27,000 m^{2} (290,000 sq ft)

The West Hills Mall is a shopping centre located at Dukonah, near Weija along the Accra – Cape Coast Highway in the Greater Accra Region of Ghana.

== History ==
The West Hills Mall which was opened on 30 October 2014. It is jointly owned by Delico Property Development Limited (60 percent) and Ghana's Social Security and National Insurance Trust (SSNIT) (40 percent).
