= Daniel Wilson Addo =

Ghanaian banker

- Born: Daniel Wilson Kodwo Addo; Accra, Ghana
- Education: Accra Academy: Institute of Professional Studies; Manchester Business School
- Occupations: Businessman; banker
- Title: managing director of CBG

Daniel Wilson Kodwo Addo is a Ghanaian banker who was managing director of CBG from August 1, 2018 to March 26, 2025. He was appointed to this position after the formation of the bank in a merger of five distressed banks by the Bank of Ghana in the 2018 Ghana banking sector clean-up. He was formerly an Executive Director of First Atlantic Bank.

== Early life ==
Daniel Addo was educated at Accra Academy and the Institute of Professional Studies in Accra where he graduated in accounting in 1991. Thereafter, he joined the offices of KPMG in Ghana and trained as an accountant. Addo obtained membership of the Institute of Chartered Accountants of Ghana and later received an MBA in Finance from Manchester Business School after studies there between 2000 and 2002.

== Career ==
Addo was employed at Standard Chartered Bank Ghana from 2003 to 2004 when he switched to work for UBA Ghana. He was made the divisional head for corporate and energy banking on joining UBA Ghana in October 2004. In January 2009, he was promoted to the position of executive director, wholesale and retail banking. In February 2011, he was appointed as deputy managing director of UBA Ghana, and a year later in the same month, moved to UBA Tanzania as managing director. Addo was managing director of UBA Tanzania from February 2012 to June 2013.

In July 2013, Addo returned to Ghana as an executive director of First Atlantic Bank then under the management of former UBA Africa C.E.O. Gabriel Edgal. At First Atlantic, Addo was appointed executive director, business development.

In 2016, Addo joined Gabriel Edgal as a partner at Oakwood Green Africa when Edgal ended his role at First Atlantic.

In August 2018, Addo was announced to become the managing director of CBG. This made him chief executive of Ghana's second largest commercial bank by branch networks. He is the bank's first managing director.

== Boards ==
Addo is a non-executive director of real-estate company, Mobus Property, which has Sam Jonah as executive chairman. He also sits on the board of insurance group, Hollard Ghana Holdings and its subsidiary Hollard Insurance.
