= Prince Kofi Amoabeng =

Ghanaian businessman

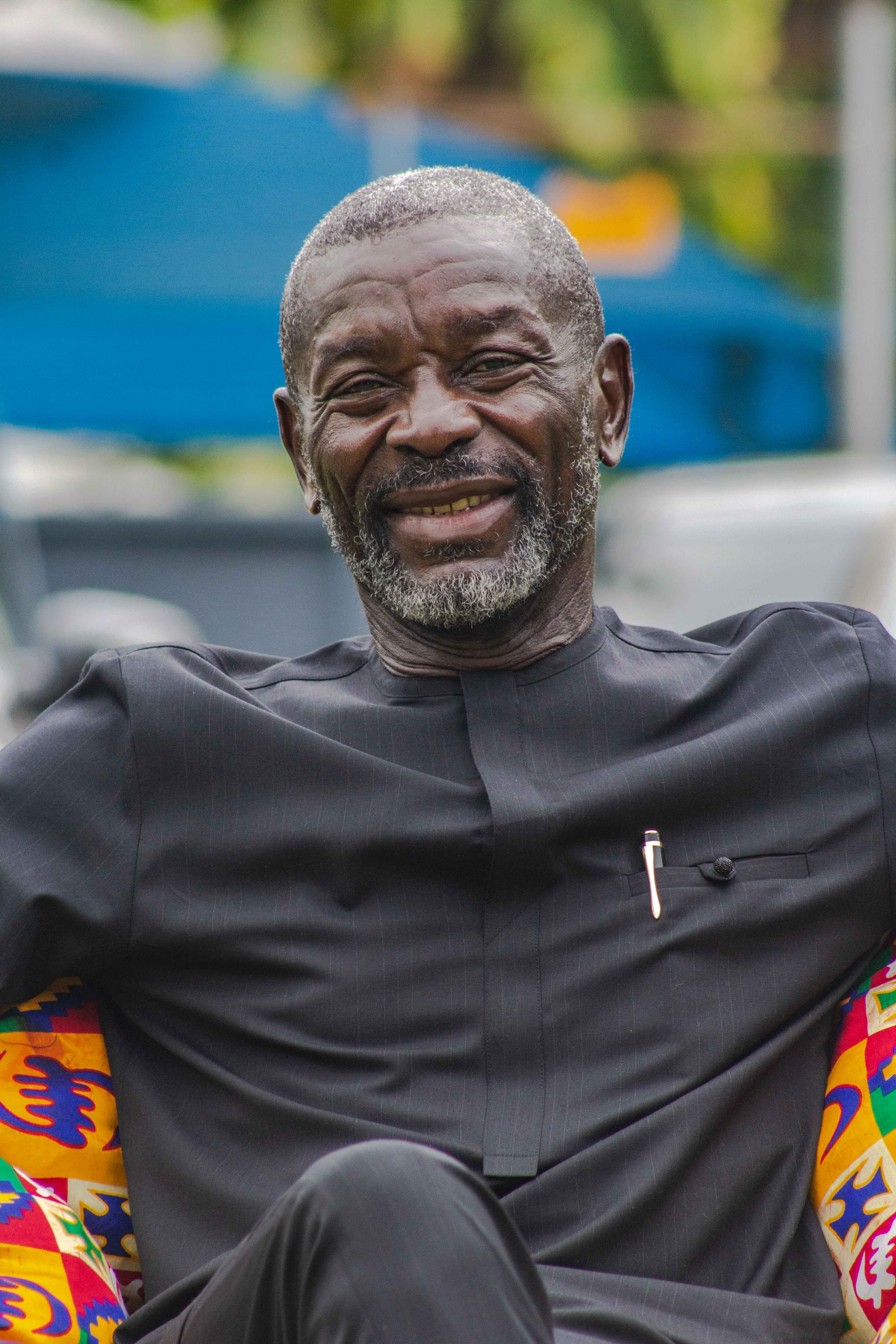
- Born: 22 February 1952 (age 74); Bososo
- Education: St. Peter's Boys Senior High School; Adisadel College; Royal Army Pay Corps; University of Ghana
- Occupation: Businessman
- Years active: 1982–2015

Prince Kofi Amoabeng (born February 22, 1952) is a Ghanaian businessman and a former military officer of the Ghanaian Armed Forces. He caused a paradigm shift in the lending industry in Ghana by founding Unique Trust Financial Services with three employees and grew it into a robust holding company, UT Holdings, with several subsidiaries both locally as well as in Africa and Europe. UT Bank, which he co-founded, collapsed in 2017 during Ghana's banking crisis amid allegations that he had misappropriated funds from the bank.

== Early life ==
Amoabeng was born on 22 February 1952 in Bososo in the Eastern Region of Ghana.

== Education ==
Amoabeng started his schooling at Penworth Preparatory School, a boarding school in Accra. He had his secondary education at the St. Peter’s Senior High School at Nkwatia Kwahu and Adisadel College in Cape Coast Ghana before proceeding to the University of Ghana for his undergraduate degree. He received a Bachelor of Science degree in administration in 1975 with 2nd-class upper honours from the University of Ghana Business School. After joining the military, he won a scholarship from the Ministry of Defence to pursue a course at the Royal Army Pay Corps, where he qualified as an accountant within 18 months and decided to return home upon graduation.

== Career ==
Amoabeng began his career in the Ghana Armed Forces in April, 1975. He was commissioned as a lieutenant in November 1975.

== Awards and recognition ==
- Lifetime Achievement for Innovation in Africa, 2013
- Johnnie Walker Giant, 2012. A global "Walk With Giants" campaign.
- Overall Best Entrepreneur in the Maiden Ghana Entrepreneurs Award (2011)
- One of two Ghanaians profiled in Moky Makura's book on Africa's Greatest Entrepreneurs which profiles 16 of Africa's top entrepreneurs.
- Ghana's Most Respected CEO for 2008/2010/2012.
- National Honours for an Order of the Star of the Volta- Officer's Division presented by thenPresident of Ghana in 2008.
- (CIMG) Marketing Man of the Year 2006

== Controversies and allegations ==
In January 2020, Amoabeng was charged with the embezzlement of a total amount of 59.9 million Ghana cedis from UT Bank, having been a cofounder of the bank which collapsed during the Ghana banking crisis. The original charges were subsequently dropped and the prosecution intends to bring other charges.
