= Ghana banking crisis =

2017–2020 restructuring of Ghana's banking industry

The Ghana banking crisis was a severe banking crisis that affected Ghana between August 2017 and January 2020. The Bank of Ghana (BoG) allowed several indigenous banks to be taken over by private companies between August 2017 and January 2019 after Nana Akufo-Addo was elected president in December 2016. Most of the indigenous banks had been at the risk of defaulting on their loans, as they had been affected by the economic fallout of the Great Recession, which caused the events leading up to the Arab Spring that occurred in North Africa beginning in 2010. The crisis is the most severe economic crisis to affect Ghana since it became an independent country in 1960. The COVID-19 pandemic arrived in Ghana towards the end of the banking crisis in 2020, dealing further damage to the country's economy.

== Background ==
On 14 August 2017, the BoG in its press release announced its approval for the takeover of two indigenous banks, UT Bank LTD and Capital Bank LTD, by GCB Bank LTD. BoG cited the insolvency of the banks in question, as the major reason for the revocation of their operation licenses. According to BoG, upon several agreements with the banks to increase their capital requirements, managers of the banks failed. Consequently, to protect customers, the licenses of the banks were revoked under a Purchase and Assumption transaction with GCB Bank LTD.

Roughly after a year later, on 1 August 2018, the BoG announced the consolidation of five indigenous banks to form a new bank called the Consolidated Bank Ghana LTD. The five collapsed banks included Unibank Ghana Ltd, The Royal Bank Ltd, Beige Bank LTD, Sovereign Bank LTD, and Construction Bank LTD The same reason of insolvency was cited as a cause of the collapse of the various banks. Within a span of two years, about seven indigenous banks have collapsed.

== Causes ==
=== Corporate governance ===
Poor corporate governance has been cited as one of the major causes of the collapse of the seven banks by BoG, and other financial analysts. Board level and senior management were either inactive or engaged in activities that inured to their personal interests rather than to the growth of the banks. For instance, there was the observation that most of the non-performing loans were advanced to people who were related to senior board managers. Furthermore, Board of Directors of banks failed to oversee bank accounting and corporate reporting systems as well as the external auditing system due to lack of experience or greed. In addition, the Boards of Directors failed to provide proper functioning risk management framework. There was also the lack of independence and integrity among Chief Internal Auditors in most of the collapsed banks, leading to cover-ups for executive directors during review processes. The general non-adherence to policies of corporate governance has greatly contributed to the collapse of these banks.

=== Non-performing loans ===
Non-performing loans is another key cause of the collapse of some of the banks. According to BoG, the banking sector assets quality remained a major concern as banks' stock of non-performing loans and the non-performing loans ratio remained high. It was observed that most of the collapsed banks had huge non-performing loans on their balance sheets. Non-performing loans affects the banks in the following way, amongst others: increase in operating costs, leading to decrease in profitability. This has financial ramifications for banks, which may cause capital reduction leading to undercapitalization.

=== Credit risk ===
Credit risk refers to the risk that a borrower will default on a loan obligation to a bank or the issuer of a security held by a bank will default on its obligations. Credit risk may arise in cases of inadequate income, loss in business, death, unwillingness and other reasons, on the side of the borrower. Large losses generated by defaults of borrowers or issuers of security can lead to insolvency and possibly to the bankruptcy of a bank. It was alleged that there was too much connivance in local banks to pick loans without any recourse to paying back or following appropriate policies. Furthermore, due to bad corporate governance, appropriate risk management practices to reduce credit risks such as proper monitoring and measuring mechanisms were not observed in credit deliveries.

=== Regulatory lapses ===
The central Bank of Ghana is the chief regulator of Ghana's banking system. They prescribe the legal and regulatory framework for the financial sector of the country. In its press release statement, BoG stated that

...regulatory non-compliance, and poor supervision, (questionable licensing processes and weak enforcement) lead to a significant build-up of vulnerabilities in the banking sector.

All these responsibilities quoted above, falls within the regulatory and supervisory role of the central Bank of Ghana. Under any circumstance, the regulator is solely responsible for reading the proactive constructs of the provisions made within the laws to protect activities within the sector, in other to prevent situations of dire consequences.

== Causes specific to the various banks ==
=== UT Bank LTD ===
==== Loan against collateral ====
In his recently launched book, former UT Bank and Capital Bank employee Samuel Okyere observed that bank loans were granted mainly on loan against collateral principle, the process of lending did not follow strict credit risk best practices. In the same book, Fate of System Thinking, the author points to a failure that was more systemic, small failures over time that ultimately culminated into the entire banking crisis.

==== Poor credit management practices ====
A significant cause of bank failure is poor credit quality and deficient credit risk assessment and measurement practices; and therefore, the failure to identify or recognize an increase in credit risks in a timely manner can cause major problems. An observation was made that there was non-adherence to credit management principles and procedures as due to the high exposure of the bank to insiders and related parties. Samuel Okyere also noted that the loans approval process was run as a closely coupled system and did not allow for diversity and varying opinion which led to confirmation biases. Some auditors, Boulders Advisors Limited, in a document stated that their review of "Loans Granted to Related Parties not Connected to the UT Group" found out that there were "poor credit management practices, poor credit governance and supervision".

=== Capital Bank LTD ===
==== Debt ====
Capital Bank was declared insolvent by BoG in August 2017. Its liabilities greatly exceeded its assets. According to the financial analyst, Sydney Casely-Hayford, noncollectable debts of GH₵11 billion owed to Capital Bank and UT Bank resulted in the collapse of the banks.

==== Questionable license process ====
It was reported that Capital Bank LTD procured its licence under false pretences.

==== Bad risk management and funds embezzlement ====
A report was made that Capital Bank collapsed because major shareholder William Ato Essien treated depositors funds and public funds as though they were his personal funds.

The liquidity support of GH₵620 million, that was issued by the central bank of Ghana to Capital Bank to cure its liquidity struggles was allegedly mismanaged, leading to its collapse.

=== uniBank Ghana LTD ===
==== Undercapitalization ====
According to the press release document by the central Bank of Ghana, during its Asset Quality Review (AQR) of banks conducted in 2015, and reviewed in 2016, uniBank Ghana LTD was identified to be significantly undercapitalized. Although the bank subsequently submitted a capital restoration plan to the central bank of Ghana, the plan failed in returning them back to solvency and compliance to prudential requirement. Hence, it was found that the bank was beyond rehabilitation.

=== Royal Bank LTD ===
==== Undercapitalization ====
The updated Asset Quality Review (AQR) of the Bank of Ghana revealed that, just as in the case of uniBank Ghana LTD, Royal Bank LTD was also significantly under-capitalized, plans to restore them back to solvency could not materialize. Hence, the Royal Bank was declared to be beyond rehabilitation.

=== Construction Bank LTD ===
==== Obtaining licence under false pretence ====
Construction Bank was granted a provisional licence in 2016 and subsequently launched in 2017. According to the Bank of Ghana report, it emerged that the Sovereign Bank LTD licence was obtained by false pretences through the use of suspicious and nonexistent capital.
