= Economy of Ashanti =

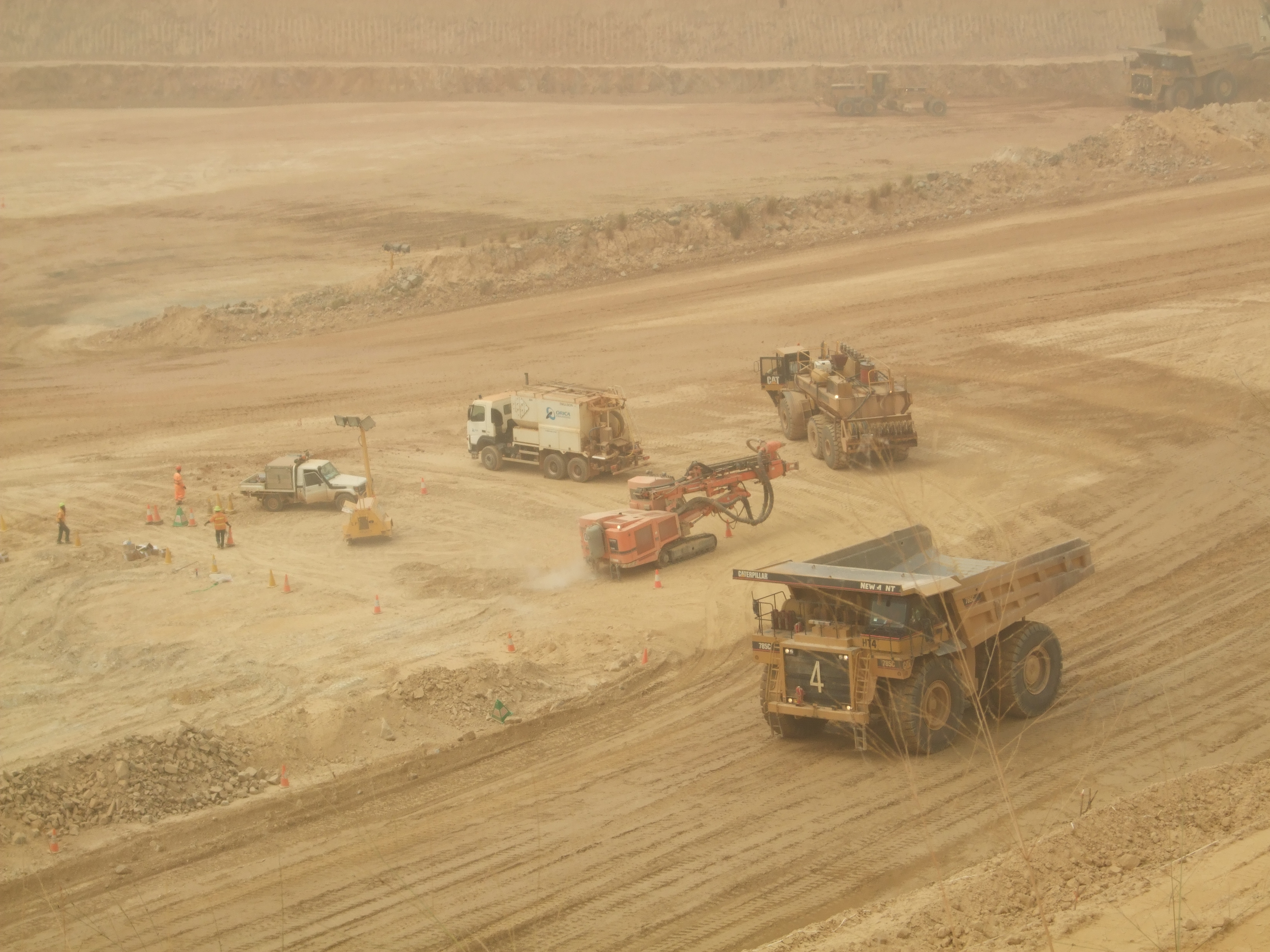
- Gold mining in Ashanti (Ashanti Region): Gold bars, manganese, bauxite, timber and cocoa are a few of Ashanti's leading export commodities
- Currency: Ghanaian Cedi

Statistics
- All values, unless otherwise stated, are in US dollars.

The economy of the Ashanti Region in southern Ghana is largely self-sufficient, being driven by its service sector as well as by natural resources. The region is also known for its production of manganese, bauxite and agricultural commodities such as cocoa and yam, with the region having low levels of taxation and without much need for foreign direct investment. The Ashanti Region spans an area of 24,389 km^{2}, and according to the 2000 census, the region had a population of 3,612,950, most of whom (94.2%) were ethnic Akans, of whom 82.9% were ethnic Ashanti. The capital of the region is Kumasi, which with a population of 2,069,350 as of 2013 represents a high level of urbanisation within the state.

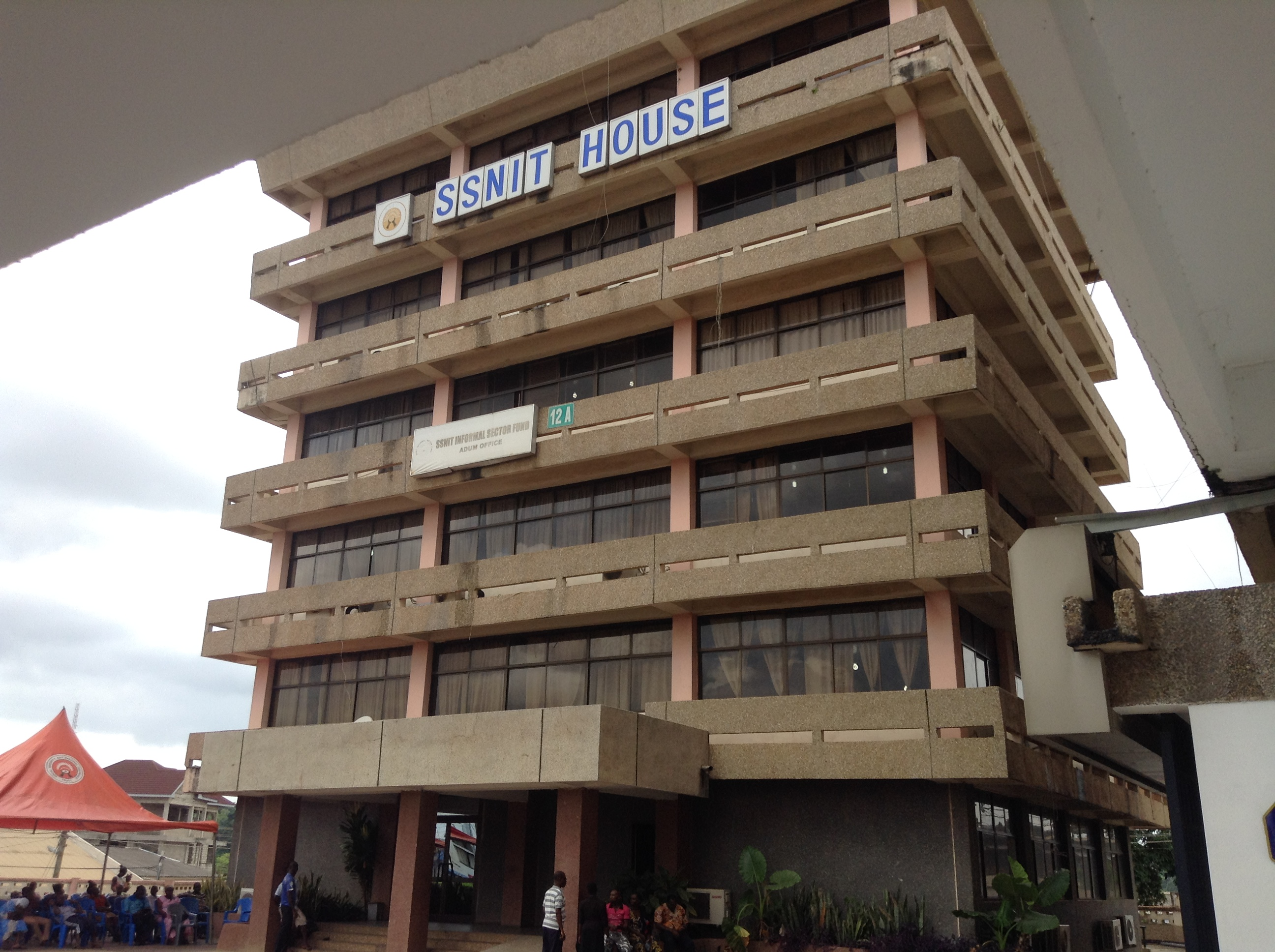
Social Security and National Insurance Trust (SSNIT) headquarters

== Structure ==
=== Overview ===
The Ashanti Region's economy is largely driven by the extraction and processing of a various industrial mineral and agricultural commodities. The economy is closely linked to the abundance of natural resources found in Ashanti region, providing a comparative advantage in resource extraction and processing. As a consequence:

- Kumasi metropolis's main occupations are professional ones, such as services and manufacturing, which account as much as 92.5% of Ashanti region's real estate activities, 90.2% of financial and insurance activities, 85.8% of air conditioning supply; and 85.7% of professional scientific and technical activities are concentrated in the area. It is predominantly a commerce/trade service economy inclusive with an employment level of 71% and this being followed by industry with an employment level of 24% and agriculture with an employment level of 5%.
- Gross regional product increased from ₵172 billion ($47.7 billion) in 2007–2008 to ₵1.06 trillion ($296.1 billion) in 2014–15 with a nominal gross domestic product per person of $26,922 (₵97,005).

Ashanti 4 state-owned indigenous banks
Institution	Location(s)
GN Bank	Adum, Subin sub-metro, Kumasi Metropolitan Assembly
Capital Bank	Adum, Subin sub-metro, Kumasi Metropolitan Assembly
UniBank	Adum, Subin sub-metro, Kumasi Metropolitan Assembly
The Royal Bank	Adum, Subin sub-metro, Kumasi Metropolitan Assembly

The Ashanti ethnic group is wealthy due to large gold deposits mined within the international borders of the Ashanti Region. The Kumasi metropolis' major processing and exports for Ashanti region are gold bullion, and is considered to be one of the top gold producers on Earth. The majority (58.7%) of the Ashanti Region's workforce are self-employed without employees.

The Ashanti inland valley and Kumasi Metropolitan Assembly is responsible for much of Ashanti's domestic food production and for the international trade foreign exchange the Ashanti ethnarch earns from cocoa, industrial agriculture cash crops, gold bar bullion, bauxite, manganese, various other industrial minerals, and timber.

=== Resources and industrial minerals ===
The Ashanti Region's major exports include gold bars and manganese—there are manganese ores deposits estimated at over 1.7 million metric tonnes at Odumase near Konongo, containing a manganese content of 19.7%, and bauxite in which Ashanti region's bauxite ores reserves are estimated at over 600 million metric tonnes, over half of which are in Nyinahim, estimated at over 350 million metric tonnes with a high content of aluminium and silica.

The mining sector of the Ashanti Region is predominated by gold mining with Ashanti region possessing an array of gold mines concessions and vast gold deposits as the Ashanti region private gold mining revenues, including galamsey, is estimated to be ₵4.3 trillion annually from gold mining with over 90% of the countries gold mining-output coming. However, an increasing portion of Ashanti region's remaining 10% of gold mining-output is from small-scale miners as means of self-employment in Ashanti region as the majority (58.7%) of the Ashanti region workforce are self-employed without employees. After galamsey was legalized, there has been a large increase in the number of small-scale mining operations as a means of self-employment, many of which do not extract gold in environmentally-friendly ways. The legislation was enacted to prevent illegal gold extraction which it claimed constituted 20% of the Ashanti Region's total gold mining-output and thus a major decrease in the Ashanti region's potential revenues from gold mining.

=== Industrial agriculture ===
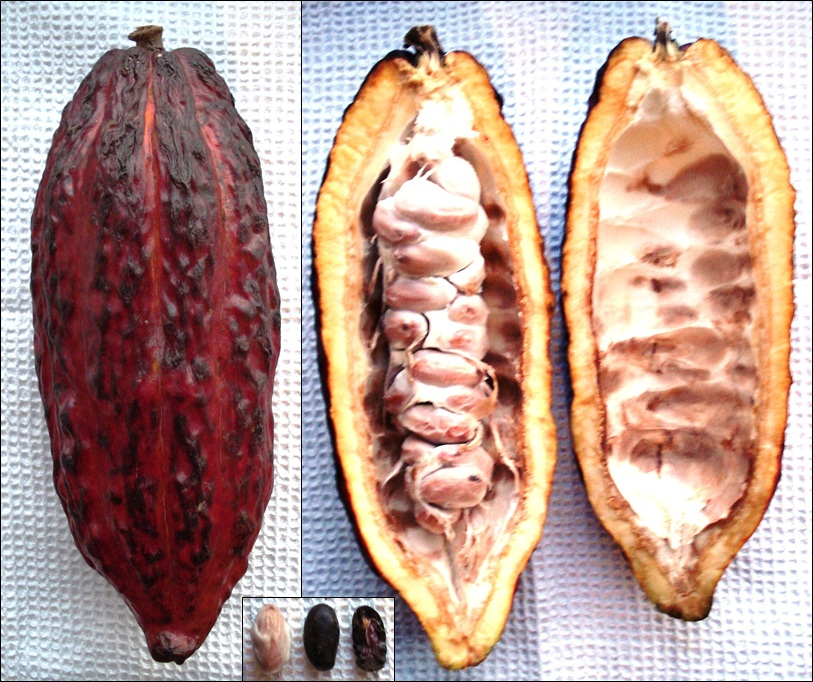
Theobroma Cacao and Cacao; Ashanti region is the second-largest cocoa producer on Earth

Industrial agricultural production is mainly undertaken for household consumption in the Ashanti Region, despite the huge demand for food by the large and relatively affluent Ashanti capital Kumasi metropolis urban populace. The region's centrality helped define its role as a major market for agricultural produce. The Ashanti Region main foods include cooking plantain, rice, maize, wheat, cassava, taro-cocoyam, pineapple, yam, vegetables and other cereals and legumes. Irish potatoes also thrive well in Nsuta near Mampong. Ashanti Region industrial crops include cocoa, palm oil, tobacco, bast fibre, cotton, citrus, cashew, sweet potatoes, millet, beans, onions, peanuts and tomatoes.

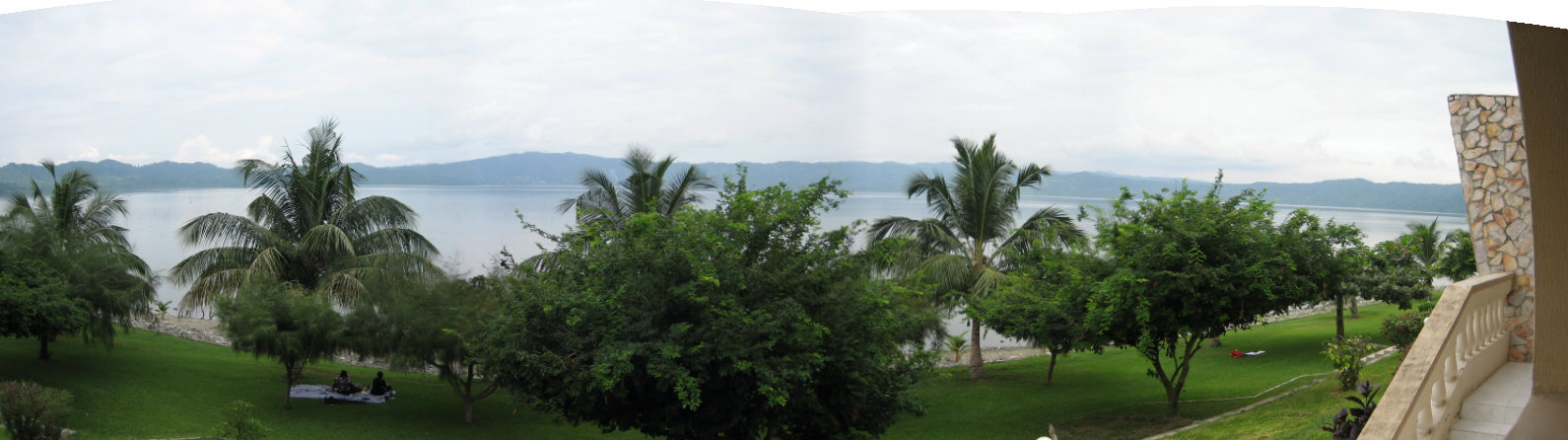
Panorama of Crater Lake Lake Bosumtwi (also spelled Bosomtwe) situated within an ancient meteorite impact crater, is approximately 8 kilometres (5.0 mi) across and the only natural lake in Ashanti. There is a plentiful supply of fish in Lake Bosumtwi, which is located just southeast of Kumasi. There are about 30 villages (human settlements) near Crater Lake Lake Bosumtwi, with a combined population of about 70,000 Ashanti people. Lake Bosumtwi is an economic and popular resort area with Ashanti people for fishing, swimming and boating.

== Economic history ==
=== Foundation (1670 to 1957) ===
The Ashanti people prepared the fields by burning before the rainy season and cultivated with an iron hoe. Fields are left fallow for usually two to four years after cultivation. Manioc and corn are New World transplants introduced during the Atlantic slave trade. Many of these vegetable crops could be harvested twice a year. The Ashanti transformed palm wine, maize and millet into beer, and made use of the oil from palm for many culinary and domestic uses. Road transport and communication throughout the Ashanti Kingdom were maintained via a network of well-kept roads from the Ashanti Kingdom to the Niger River while linking other trade cities together. The Ashanti people invented the Fontomfrom, an Asante talking drum, and the Akan Drum.

=== Post-war era (1957 to present) ===
The predominant means of travel within Ashanti region and Kumasi metropolis is by road. Ashanti capital Kumasi metropolis has been planned with arterial roads and collector roads. Kumasi's metropolitan road network is radial, with Kejetia and Adum being the hub of the network.

The Kumasi Metropolitan Assembly's railway lines and train service has been suspended for several years because of damaged tracks, bridges and locomotives. Currently, no train is running from and to Ashanti capital Kumasi due to the collapse of the Railway Corporation some years back. A$6 billion project to upgrade the railways, was due to start in 2011 as the project is yet to be completed. The construction of the Boankra Inland Port in Ashanti region, about 25 kilometres (16 mi) away from the Subin sub-metropolitan area of Kumasi was expected to be completed in 2015.
