= Kejetia Market =

Marketplace in Ashanti Region, Ghana

Kumasi Central Market Kejetia Market
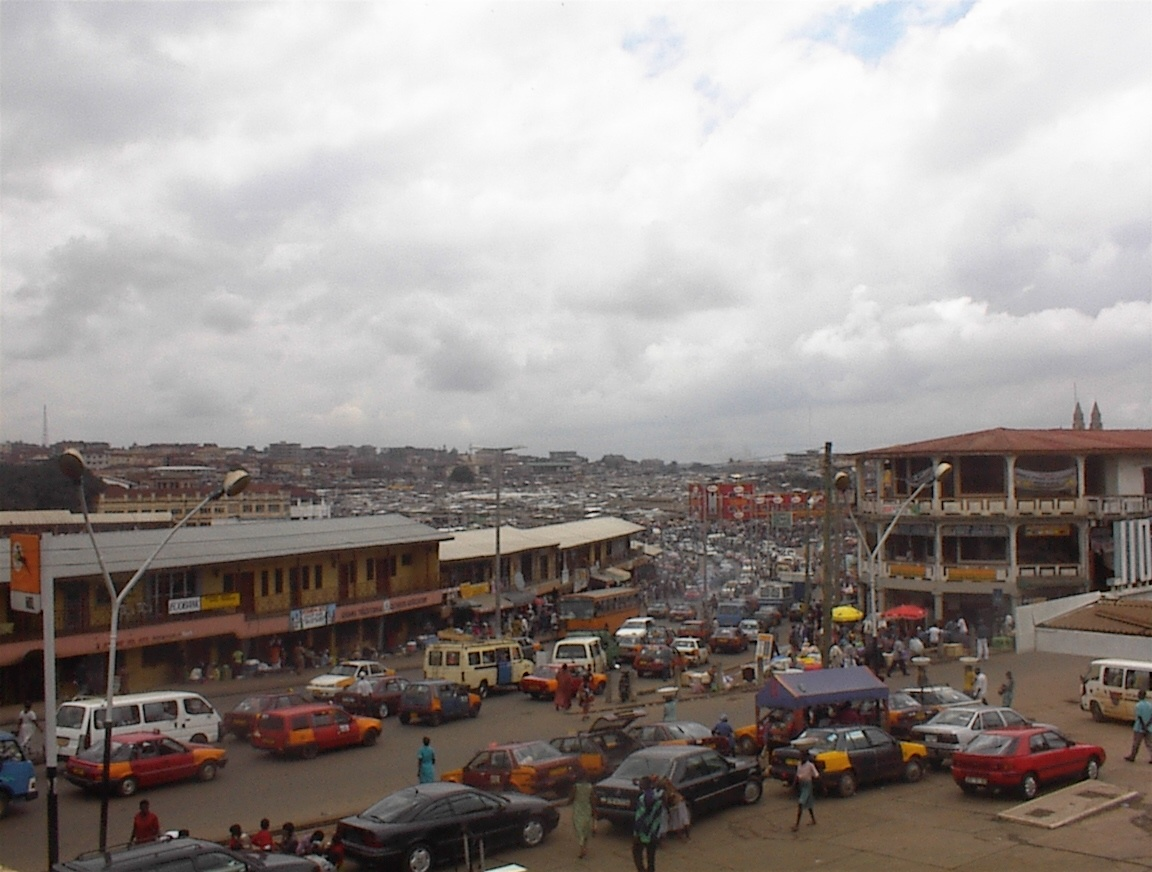
- Drone shot of the Kumasi Central Market from above
- Location: Kumasi, Ghana
- Coordinates: 6.698635°N 1.619140°W
- Address: Kejetia Road
- Opened: 1924; 102 years ago
- Manager: Kumasi Metropolitan Assembly; Ashanti Monarch
- Num. of stores: approx. 8,000+
- Website: https://kejetia.africa

The Kumasi Central Market, also known as (Kejetia Market), is an open-air marketplace in Kumasi, a city in the Ashanti Region of Ghana. The market has over 8,000 stores and stalls, making it the largest single market in West Africa. About 50,000 people visit the market daily, while there are 20,000 vendors operating in it.

== Formation ==
The market, along with the makola market in Accra, was established in 1924, modeled after British markets in order to house large numbers of vendors. This led to an increase of market and street trading in the city. During this time, a lorry park was constructed to help with the large number of people who go to the market. Due to the lack of investment in the market, infrastructure and hygiene conditions were poor. Because of this, the colonial government tried to promote large-scaled industrialization to stop the ever-increasing number of vendors. Although, after Ghana's independence, there was still a large percentage of the workforce working in small-scale activities including trading.

== Redevelopment project ==
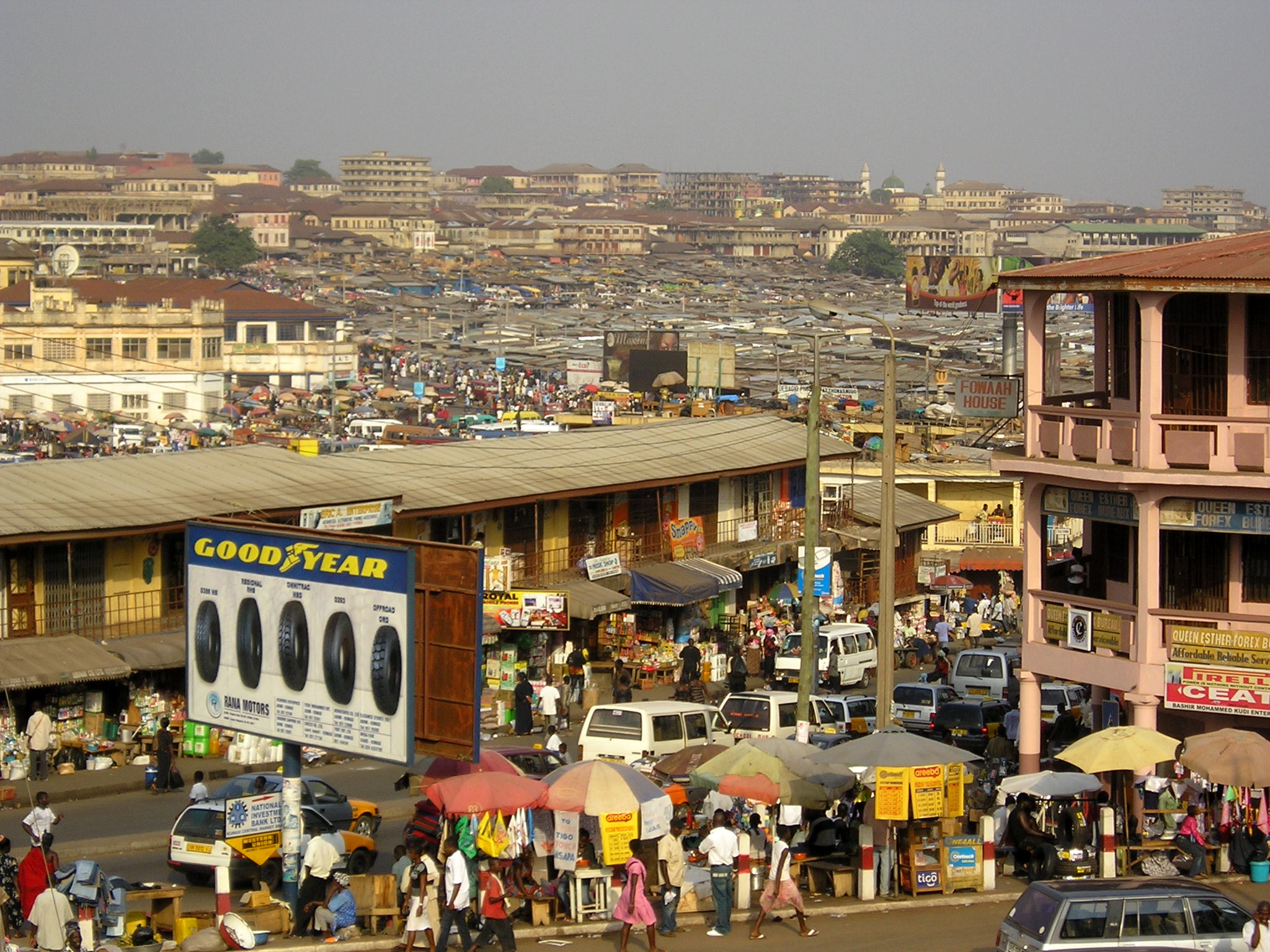
Kumasi Market

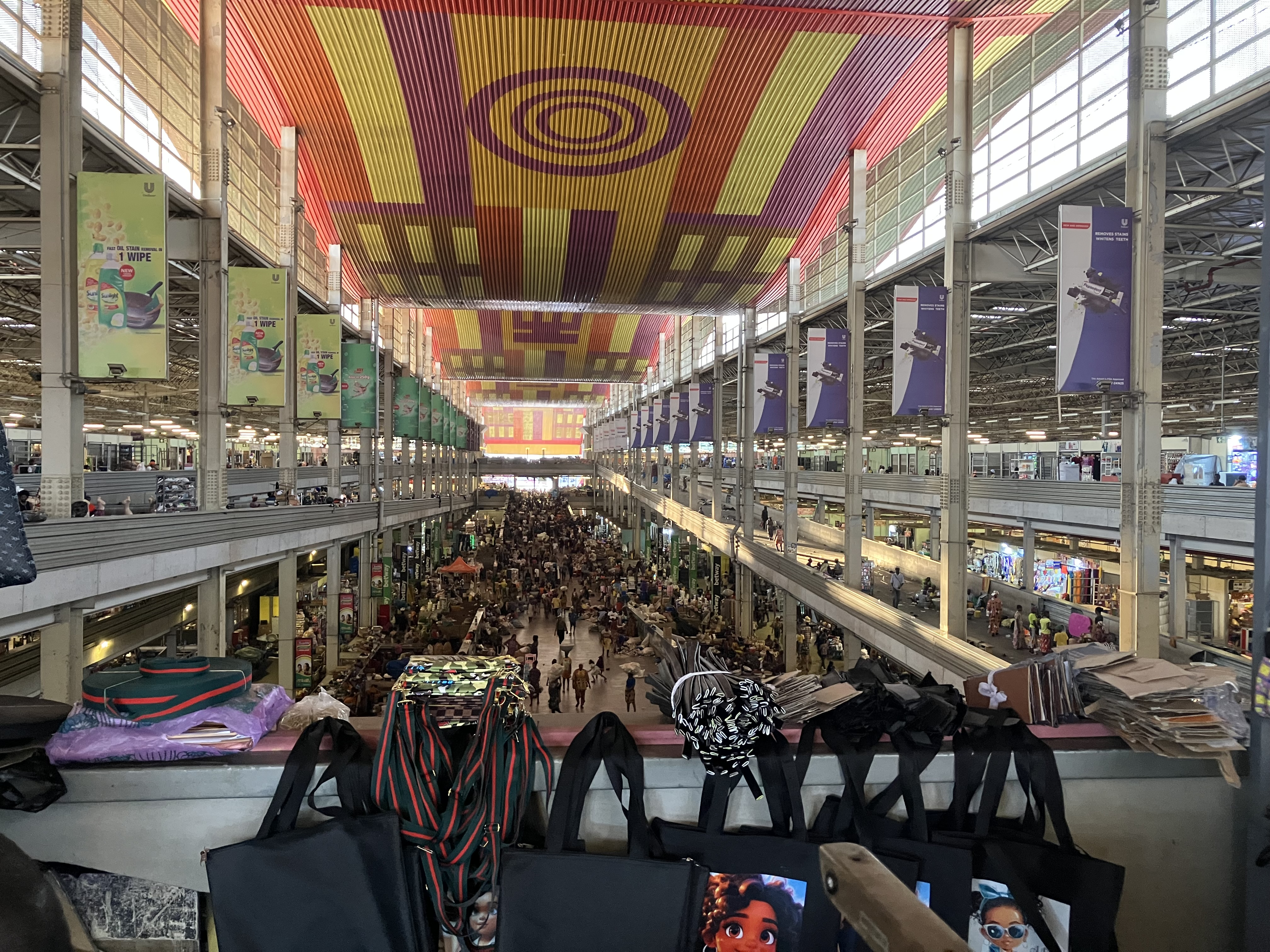
New modern market hall in 2025

In August 2015, the Government of Ghana announced a redevelopment plan for the entire market. The project is currently on its second phase.

=== Phase 1 ===
The first phase of the project began in 2015 and was valued at a cost of US$259,425,000 by the John Dramani Mahama government. The phase included a brand new market equipped with about 8,420 stores. It was completed in late 2018.

=== Phase 2 ===
The second phase was undertaken by the Nana Akufo-Addo government and the Asantehene on 2 May 2019 for work to commence. It is estimated to cost around US$248 million and is being financed by Deutsche Bank. It is still yet to be completed.

== Incidents ==
=== Fires ===
Fire outbreaks have historically been an issue of the Kejetia market. In January and March 2016, fires destroyed more than 200 shops and vendors' property.

In January 2025 there was another fire outbreak at the Kejetia market in Kumasi.

=== Power ===
On 28 June 2022, the market was taken off the national grid over huge debts that had accrued for 14 months. The market has had power restored following a 20 percent payment of the GH¢5.2 million debt owed the Electricity Company of Ghana (ECG).

== See also ==
- Economy of Ashanti
