= GN Bank =

Private bank in Ghana

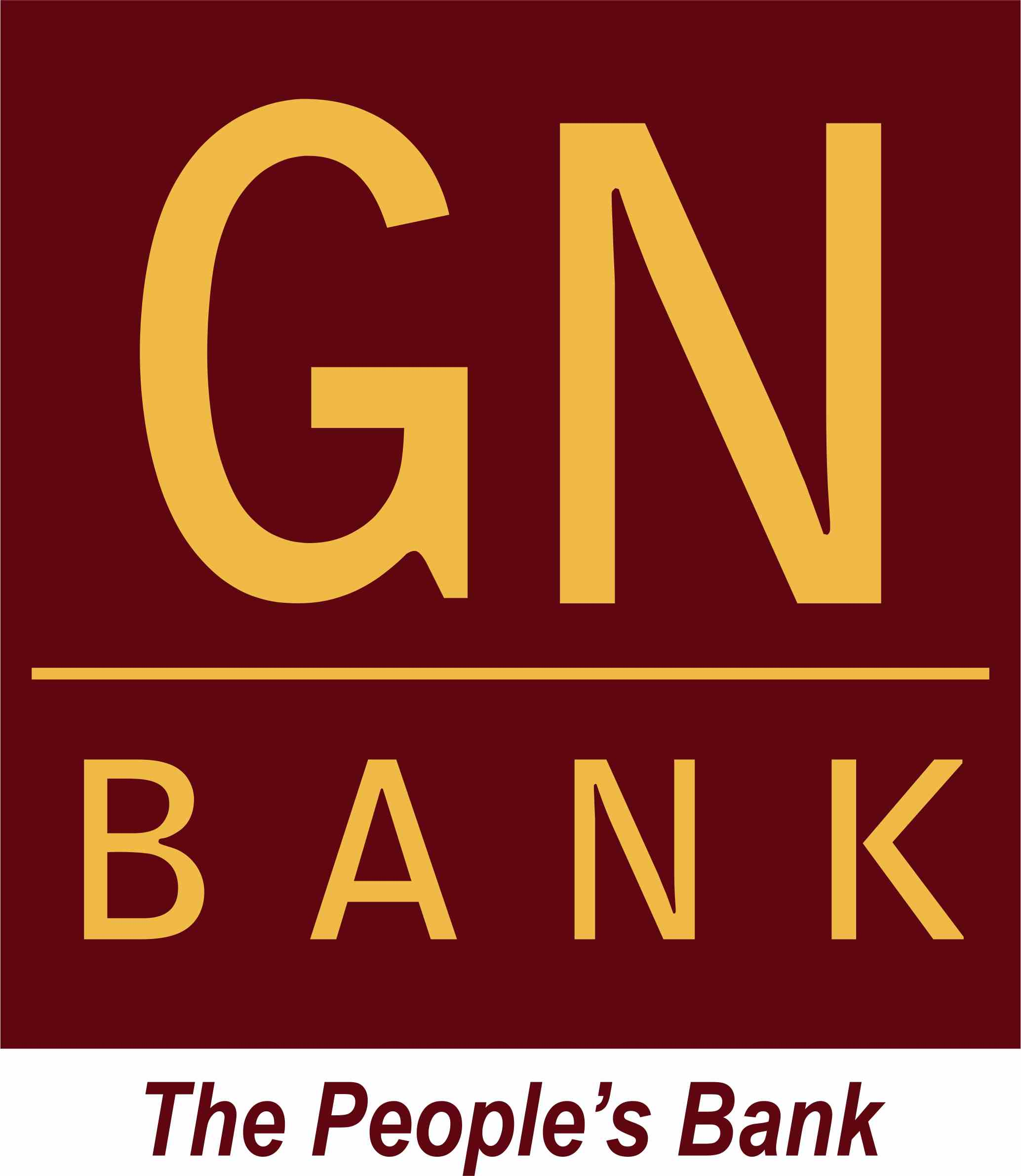
- Company type: Private ownership
- Industry: Private banking, National development banking, Asset management, Investment banking, Financial services
- Founded: 30 May 1997
- Headquarters: Accra, Ghana
- Key people: Papa Kwesi Nduom; Chairman; Issah Adam; MD
- Products: Private banking, National development banking, Asset management, Investment banking, Investments, Loans, Savings, Checking, E-banking
- Revenue: ▲
- Total assets: US$398 Million; 2015; GHS:1.8+ Billion; 2015
- Number of employees: 1,677
- Website: www.gnbankghana.com

GN Bank is an indigenous private Ghanaian owned commercial bank in Ghana. GN Bank is one of the private commercial banks licensed to operate in Ghana. GN Bank has over 260 locations across the 10 regions of Ghana.

GN Savings and Loans Company Limited was originally incorporated as First National Savings and Loans (FNSL) Company Limited and licensed as a Savings and Loans Company on 8 May 2006. It was subsequently issued with a universal banking license by the Bank of Ghana on 4 September 2014 and was renamed GN Bank Limited.

== Services ==
GN Bank offers mainstream banking services which include cash deposits and withdrawals, savings and loans and financial advice consultation (private banking, corporate banking, consumer banking, corporate products, lending products, special services, money transfer). In 2014, GN Bank introduced a cash deposit service known as E-Banking. The service allows GN Bank customers to deposit cash into their bank accounts at their convenience through their smartphones (mobile phones) via First SMS Alert banking (First Net Banking) and M-POS (Mobile Point Of Sales) Electronic Statement without physically being present in any bank branches of the GN Bank.

In 2019 the bank of Ghana revoked the licenses of 23 savings and loans companies and finance house companies, which included the GN Bank.

A statement issued by the BoG on Friday, 16 August 2019 said the revocation of the licencss of the institutions had become necessary because they were insolvent even after a reasonable period within which the Bank of Ghana had engaged with them in the hope that they would be recapitalized by their shareholders to return them to solvency.

== Restoration of License ==
On May 21, 2026, the Court of Appeal unanimously reinstated the license of GN Savings and Loans Company Limited, which had been revoked during the 2018 banking sector clean-up. After a series of long battle with the courts to get license restored, the GN Bank finally had their license restored. The bank, through its owner Dr. Nduom, has always argued that the revocation of its license was unlawful, unthinkable, and witch-hunting.

The President of Group Nduom, Dr Nana Kweku Nduom, has listed the next steps for the reopening of GN Bank following the restoration of its license after years of court battles.

He indicated that they will hold several meetings with key stakeholders including; Bank of Ghana, Board members, customers and other parties. He said they are hoping to start operation before the end of the year 2026.

According to the bank, 4,500 people lost their jobs due to the revocation of their license and closure of operation; these were both direct and indirect jobs that were linked to their operation.

== Board of directors ==
- Papa Kwesi Nduom is Chairman; Mr Issah Adams is Managing Director.

== Branches ==
GN Bank is headquartered in Accra. GN Bank as at June 2016 has Two -hundred-and-sixty (260) operational branches in all the ten regions of Ghana territorial entities: Ashanti (23 operational branches); Brong-Ahafo (44 operational branches); Central (31 operational branches); Eastern (30 operational branches); Greater Accra (38 operational branches); Volta (18 operational branches); Northern (29 operational branches); Upper East (18 operational branches); Upper West (14 operational branches) and Western (27 operational branches).

== Sponsorships ==
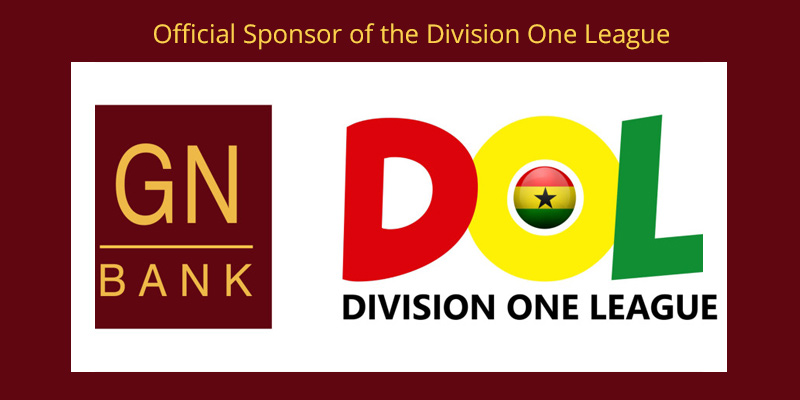
GN Bank Division One League

On 30 December 2014, GN Bank became the headline sponsor of the GN Bank Division One League. This sponsorship agreement between the GN Bank and the GFA is a three-year deal worth 1.2 million cedis to 2017.

== Awards ==
- In October, 2015 GN Bank wins Fastest growing Bank in Ghana at the 2015 Association of Ghana Industries Awards.

== See also ==
- Capital Bank
- UniBank
- The Royal Bank
