= Consolidated Bank Ghana =

Commercial bank in Ghana

Coordinates: 05°35′59″N 00°10′38″W

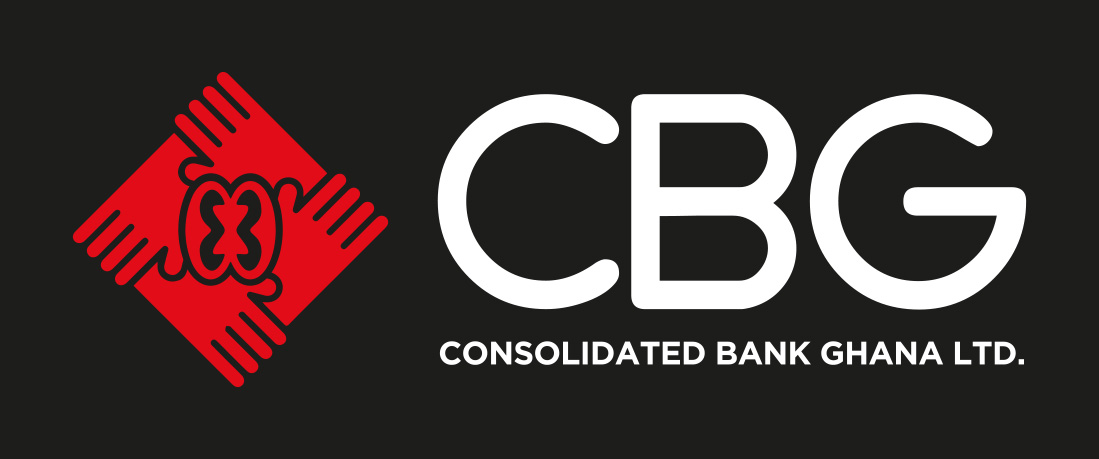
- Type: Parastatal
- Traded as: CBG
- Industry: Financial services
- Founded: August 1, 2018; 7 years ago
- Headquarters: Manet Tower C Plot 27 3rd Floor Suite B Accra, Ghana,
- Key people: William Abra-Appiah, chairman; Daniel Wilson Addo, CEO
- Products: Loans, savings, checking, investments, debit cards, mobile banking
- Revenue: ▲: Aftertax: GHS:72,261,000 (US$9,743,000) (2021)
- Total assets: GHS: 10.751 billion (US$1.450 billion) (2021)
- Website: Homepage

Consolidated Bank Ghana (CBG) is a commercial bank in Ghana. It is licensed by the Bank of Ghana, the central bank and national banking regulator.

== Location ==
The headquarters and main branch of the bank are located on the First Floor, Manet Tower 3, Airport City, Accra. This location is immediately west of Accra International Airport. The geographical coordinates of the headquarters of CBG are:05°35'59.0"N, 0°10'38.0"W (Latitude:5.599722; Longitude:-0.177222).

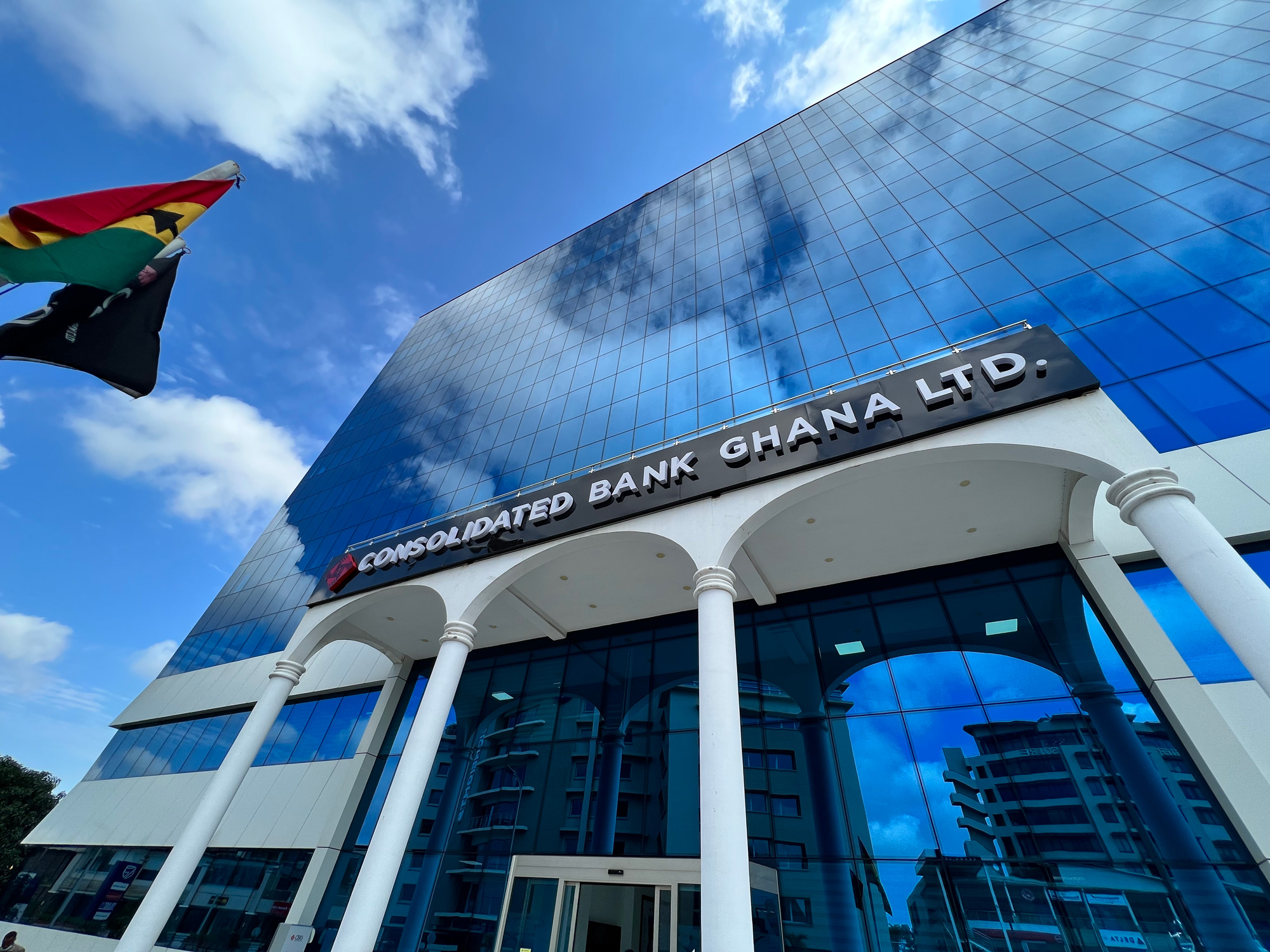

== Overview ==
Consolidated Bank Ghana Limited (CBG) is a large financial services organization, serving large corporations, high net-worth individuals, non-governmental organizations, regular customers and small and medium sized enterprises. As of 31 December 2021, the bank had total assets of GHS:10,751,164,000 (US$1,449,578,900), with shareholders' equity of GHS:801,545,000 (US$108. 1 million). As of October 2019, CBG had 114 branches, 119 ATMs and approximately one million customers. Its executive management includes Nana Ama Poku as Deputy Managing Director, Corporate Resources; Thairu Ndungu as Managing Director, Operations; and Daniel Wilson Addo as Chief Executive Officer.

== History ==
In September 2017, the Bank of Ghana directed all universal banks in Ghana to raise their minimum capital reserves from GHS: 120 million (US$22.8 million) to GHS: 400 million (US$73.4 million). Five banks that failed to meet the minimum requirements were merged, namely Construction Bank, the Beige Bank, the Royal Bank, UniBank and Sovereign Bank. On 1 August 2018, the banking licenses of these five banks were cancelled and their assets and selected liabilities were merged to form Consolidated Bank Ghana Limited. In addition, these five banks had committed regulatory breaches that made it impossible for them to operate as banking institutions, so the Bank of Ghana closed them and fired their boards and senior management.

== Recapitalization ==
The government of Ghana issued a bond worth GHS: 5.76 billion (US$1.2 billion) to retire the debt of the insolvent five banks.

== Ownership ==
Consolidated Bank Ghana Limited is 100 percent owned by the government of Ghana.

== Branches ==
Consolidated Bank began operations with 148 branches in nine regions of Ghana. These were all branches of the five defunct banks the Bank of Ghana took over. By October 2019, the number of branches had been rationalized to 114.

== Awards and recognitions ==
In 2020 the bank was one of twelve institutions that picked up honorary awards at the ninth Association of Ghana Industries (AGI) Ghana Industry and Quality Awards.

== See also ==
- List of banks in Ghana
- Economy of Ghana
