= The Royal Bank, Ghana =

Ghanaian bank

The Royal Bank is a former banking and financial institution headquartered at Legon, Ghana.

The bank was established in 2012 and has several branches all over the country. Six months after the start of operations, the bank had opened five more branches. In 2017, management of the bank announced they were improving the financial status of bank in order to meet the minimum requirement policy set by the Bank of Ghana that was to come into effect at the end of 2018.

The updated Asset Quality Review (AQR) of the central bank of Ghana revealed that, just as in the case of uniBank Ghana LTD, Royal Bank LTD was also significantly under-capitalized, plans to restore them back to solvency could not materialize. Hence, Royal Bank LTD was declared to be beyond rehabilitation. Therefore, Bank of Ghana revoked their license.
