= Capital Bank (Ghana) =

Capital Bank Ghana Limited
- Company type: Public
- Industry: Private banking, Retail banking, Asset management, Investment banking, Financial services
- Founded: 2009; 17 years ago
- Headquarters: Spintex road Adjacent Papaye fast food,Accra
- Key people: William Ato Essien; Founder; Mensa Otabil; Chairman; Rev. Fizgerald Odonkor; CEO
- Products: Private banking, Asset management, Investment banking, Investments, Loans, Savings, Speed banking, Speedpay
- Revenue: ▲
- Total assets: US$140 million; 2013; GHS:286.80+ million; 2013
- Number of employees: 355
- Website: www.capitalbankghana.com

Capital Bank (previously First Capital Plus Bank) was an indigenous private national development and commercial Ghanaian bank. It was one of the private national development and commercial banks licensed by Bank of Ghana, the national banking regulator. On August 14, 2017, the Bank of Ghana announced it had revoked its license due to insolvency during Ghana's banking crisis. The bank was then taken over by GCB Bank. The founder of the bank, William Ato Essien and three others were subsequently charged with misappropriating 100 million Ghana Cedis of the Bank's assets.

== History ==
Capital Bank was founded by William Ato Essien on 29 October 2009 as a microfinance company. As the assets of the company grew, it became a Savings and Loans Company known as First Capital Plus Saving and Loans Company. In 2010 the microfinance grew its deposit base to 36.06 million cedis and total asset size of 47.18 million cedis. In 2013 First Capital Plus Bank had a deposit base of 211.11 million cedis and total assets of 286.80million cedis. At that time, the Bank of Ghana stated that FCP has a market share of 16% of the advances of savings and loans companies and 19% of the sector total assets. The Bank employed 355 and had 15 branches covering five regions. The company grew its base deposit and assets from its inception till 2013 when it applied and was awarded a provisional universal banking license in July, 2012. After the six month provisional period, the bank was given a full license on 4 December 2013 and became officially known as First Capital Plus Bank. The firm later re-branded to Capital Bank in 2015.

The Central Bank of Ghana issued a press release on August 14, 2017, announcing the revocation of the license of Capital Bank due to insolvency (another bank, UT Bank also had its license revoked). The statement further mentioned that change of control of Capital Bank had been approved for another bank, the Ghana Commercial Bank.

== Services ==
The bank offered mainstream banking services which include cash deposits and withdrawals, savings and loans and financial advice consultation. In 2011 it introduced a cash deposit service known as SpeedBanking. The service allowed bank customers to deposit cash into their bank accounts at their convenience through their mobile phones without physically being present in any bank branch.

== Board of directors ==
- Mensa Otabil was chairman; Rev. Fitzgerald Odonkor was chief executive officer, William Ato Essien (Founder), Mr. Kofi Kwakwa (Director), Mrs. Frances Adu-Mante (Director), Alhaji Amadu Montia (Director)

== Branches ==
Capital Bank had its headquarters at the Capital Plaza on the Spintex Road, adjacent Papaye Fast food. As at December 2015 the Bank had eighteen operational branches in regions across Ghana

== Sponsorship ==
Ghana Premier League Logo

On 4 February 2014, Capital Bank became the headline sponsor of the Ghana Premier League. This sponsorship agreement between the Bank and the Ghana Football Association was a five-year deal worth ten million dollars. The deal was hailed by Elvis Afriyie Ankrah, Minister of Youth and Sports of Ghana and was considered timely as the Ghanaian league had been without a title sponsor for over four months. The bank per the agreement will pay the Ghana Football Association two million dollars per year until 2019. The first payment of five hundred thousand dollars was made on 5 February 2014.

== Awards ==
- In September, 2013 Capital Bank was the non-bank financial institution of the year 2012 by the Chartered Institute of Marketing Ghana.
- In October, 2013 Capital Bank was the 10th best performing company for the year 2012 and the best in the Non-Bank Financial Institutions sector at the Ghana Club 100 Awards organized by the Ghana Investment Promotion Center.
- In August, 2016 Best Growing Bank, Best Bank in Household/Retail Banking and Best Bank in Savings and Deposits went to Capital Bank Ghana LTD.
