= First Atlantic Bank =

Ghanaian commercial bank

- Company type: Private
- Industry: Financial services
- Founded: 1995; 31 years ago
- Headquarters: 1 Seventh Avenue, Ridge West, Accra, Ghana
- Key people: Mr. Amarquaye Armar; Chairperson; Odun Odunfa; Managing Director
- Products: Loans, Checking, Savings, Investments, Credit cards, Debit cards, Prepaid cards, Mortgages
- Revenue: ▲Aftertax:GHS28,016,000 (Q3:2019)
- Total assets: GHS:2.42 billion (Q3:2019)
- Number of employees: 600+ (2020)
- Website: Homepage

First Atlantic Bank is a universal bank in Ghana. It is licensed as a commercial bank, by the Bank of Ghana, the central bank and national banking regulator.

== Overview ==
As of 30 September 2019, the bank controlled assets valued at GHS:2.42 billion (approx. US$420 million), with shareholders' equity of GHS:518.4 million (US$90 million). As of May 2019, the bank maintained 41 networked branches, 65 automated teller machines, and 260 point of sale devices, in all regions of Ghana.

== History ==
The Bank was started in 1995 as a merchant bank and operated mainly in Accra. In 2011 the Bank of Ghana granted it universal bank status. In September 2017, the Bank of Ghana directed all universal banks in Ghana to raise their minimum capital reserves from GHS:120 million (US$22.8 million) to GHS:400 million (US$73.4 million). In December 2018, First Atlantic Bank merged with Energy Bank Ghana, to meet new capital guidelines, mandated by the Bank of Ghana. The name of the merged entity remained First Atlantic Bank (Ghana) Limited

== Governance ==
The chairperson of the nine-member board of directors is Mr. Amarquaye Armar. The managing director and chief executive officer is Odun Odunfa.
