= UniBank =

Ghanaian bank

uniBank
- Company type: Private ownership
- Industry: Financial services
- Founded: 1997; 29 years ago
- Headquarters: World Trade Center; Accra, Greater Accra
- Key people: Opoku-Gyamfi Boateng chairman Dr. Kwabena Duffuor II chief executive officer
- Products: Loans, checking, savings, investments, debit cards
- Revenue: ▲:Aftertax: US$8.7 million (2013) (GHS:26,016,118)
- Total assets: US$433+ million (2013) (GHS:1.3 billion)
- Website: Homepage

uniBank (Ghana) Limited, commonly known as uniBank, was an indigenous private bank in Ghana, West Africa. The bank was placed in administration in March 2018 and subsequently consolidated as part of the Ghana Government's handling of its banking crisis. The collapse was controversial as it involved allegations of trading insolvently, and 5 billion cedis in illegal and related party transactions, unlawful loans and illegal acquisition of bank assets by Directors and shareholders. Founded by a former governor of the Bank of Ghana, uniBank was one of the thirty-five commercial banks licensed to operate in Ghana.

== Overview ==
uniBank was a tier one financial services provider, in 2013 the bank's total assets were valued at approximately US$433 million (GHS:1.3 billion), with shareholders' equity of approximately US$50 million (GHS:151 million).

The bank was placed under administration on 20 March 2018 as part of Ghana's ongoing banking crisis. It was subsequently placed in receivership and consolidated into the Consolidated Bank Ghana Limited with four other failed banks.

At the time of its demise it was reported it had received some 2.2bn cedis since 2016 in liquidity support to enable it to operate. A subsequent report by the receivers reported that the bank was insolvent at the time of the administration and that Directors and shareholders of the bank engaged in illegal transactions by giving out unlawful loans and advances as well as illegal acquisition of assets in the name of related interests. The receiver subsequently sued the founder and various related parties for the return of more than 5 billion cedis.

The bank was founded by Dr Kwabena Duffuor, a former Governor of the Bank of Ghana under the Jerry Rawlings' NDC Government and former Finance Minister under the Atta Mills' NDC Government. At the time of the bank's demise it was led by his son Dr Kwabena Duffuor II (sometimes referred to as Dr Kwabena Duffuor jr).

== History ==
uniBank was incorporated in 1997 as a financial services provider. Following the issuance of a banking license, uniBank began providing banking services in January 2001, focusing on meeting the banking needs of small and medium-sized enterprises (SMEs) and those of individual customers. In 2009, the bank began offering Internet banking and mobile banking.

== Ownership ==
The stock of uniBank is privately held. The detailed shareholding in the company stock is not publicly available at the moment.

== Leadership ==
At the time of the bank's demise, Dr Kwabena Duffuor II had been its chief executive officer since replacing Felix Nyarko-Pong on June 1, 2017. Prior to this, he had served as the chief operating officer from June 2013.

Other management included Ekow Nyarko Dadzie-Dennis (chief operating officer), Owusu-Ansah Awere (executive director), Clifford Duke Mettle (executive director), Sylvia Assimeng-Archer (executive secretary), John Collins Arthur (executive head of treasury and global trade), Kwesi Nkrumah Pimpah (director of risk management), Elsie Dansoa Kyereh (executive head of corporate banking) and Florence Ohene (executive head of innovations and business execution).

== Branch Network ==
As of May 2017, uniBank maintained 55 networked branches in nine of Ghana's ten regions namely: Ashanti, Greater Accra, Western Region, Eastern Region, Brong Ahafo, Northern Region and Upper East Region.

== Sponsorships ==
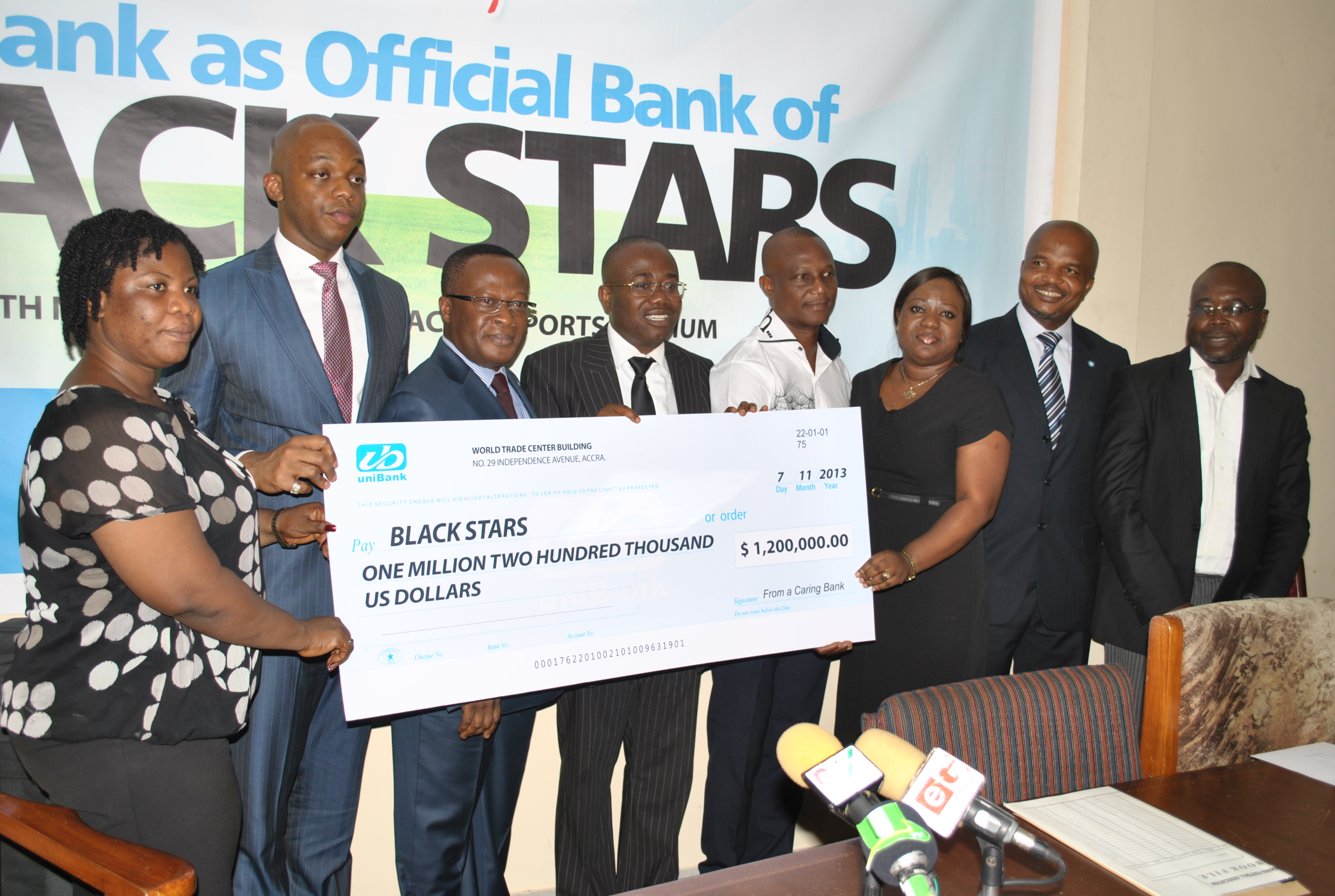
uniBank signs sponsorship deal with Ghana Black Stars

On 7 November 2013, uniBank became the first indigenous bank to sponsor the Ghana national football team – The Black Stars. This sponsorship agreement between the bank and the Ghana Football Association was a three-year deal worth 1.2 million dollars. The deal was hailed by Kwesi Nyantakyi, President of the GFA and was considered timely as the team was preparing for their final phase of the 2014 World Cup in Brazil. The bank per the agreement was to pay the Ghana Football Association 400,000 dollars per year until 2015.

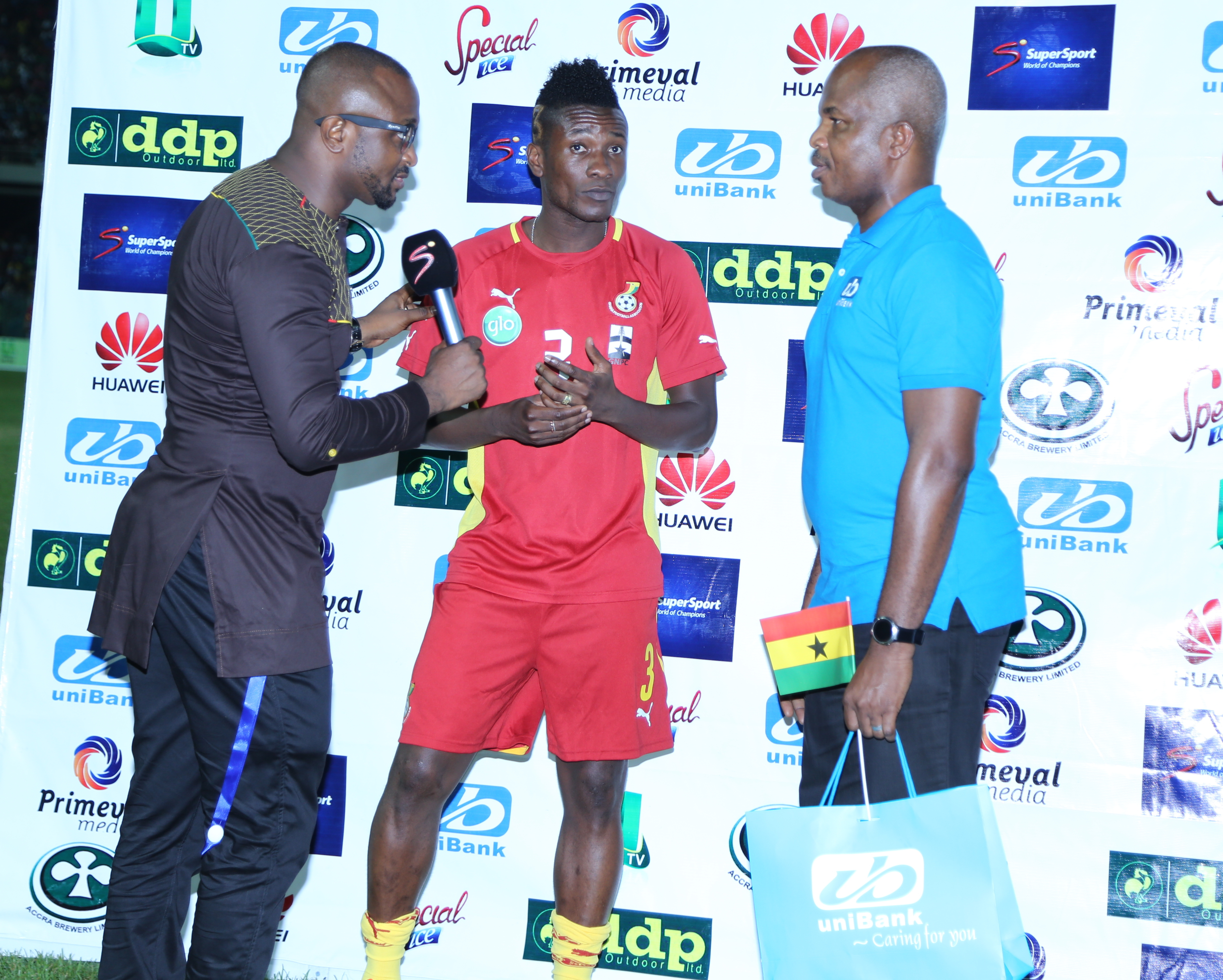
uniBank Brand Icon-Asamoah Gyan with Owusu-Ansah Awere, Executive Director, uniBank.

Brand Ambassador - uniBank the official bank of the Black Stars, on January 22, 2014 struck a two-year deal with Black Stars’ captain, Asamoah Gyan, as its brand icon. Gyan, who led the Black Stars to their third successive World Cup qualification, will for two years, promote the products and services of the bank. Gyan, as per the terms of the deal, would appear on print and electronic advertising media of the bank, as well as endorse the brand in and outside the country, while the bank will make annual financial commitments to the player.

== Bank of Ghana takeover and controversies ==
On the 20 March 2018, the Bank of Ghana appointed KPMG, an audit firm, as administrators for uniBank.

Emmanuel Akrong, who is the author of Asset Quality Performance of Banks in Ghana, the book that predicted the collapse of at least eight banks, has claimed "Unibank was borrowing to finance its loans" before its takeover by Bank of Ghana.

UniBank was one of nine banks identified after the asset quality review exercise undertaken in 2016, to be significantly undercapitalised with a CAR of 4.75%.

The bank, in a statement released by the governor of BoG, persistently suffered liquidity shortfalls and consistently breached its cash reserve requirement.

KPMG were announced as administrators of the bank and were given six months to manage the bank after which it was to revert to an unnamed private organization. It was reported at the time that the bank had a negative capital adequacy of -24% at December 2017 and had been reliant on more than 2.2 billion cedis (US$498m at the time) of liquidity support from the BoG.

Following a confidential report by KPMG, the bank was placed in receivership under KPMG. On 1 August 2018, the Bank of Ghana (BoG) announced that it was creating the Consolidated Bank Gh. Ltd to take over the bank with four other struggling banks.

The receiver subsequently sued the founder and various related parties for the return of more than 5 billion cedis alleging the bank was insolvent at the time of the administration and that directors and shareholders of the bank engaged in illegal transactions by giving out unlawful loans and advances as well as illegal acquisition of assets in the name of related interests and illegal related party transactions. The defendants include the founder Dr Duffuor and Hoda Holdings Ltd, Hoda Properties, Alban Logistics, Starlife Assurance, Dr Kwabena Duffuor II, Boatemaa Kakra Duffuor-Nyarko and Nana Boakye Asafu-Adjaye.

On 20 May 2018, it was reported that nearly 500 uniBank employees had been served with dismissal letters. Those affected included security personnel and tellers who were outsourced from a company allegedly owned by Dr Kwabena Duffuor, founder of the bank.

On 21 August 2018, it was reported that the founder of the bank, Dr Duffuor, was suing the Ghana Government in an attempt to regain control of the bank. Among other issues he claimed that the revocation of uniBank's banking licence constituted an unlawful expropriation of the bank's property and he challenged the legality of issuing a banking licence to the new consolidating entity Consolidated Bank Ghana. The lawsuit also disclosed that almost all the bank's loan book had been classed as impaired by the Government appointed Receiver.

On 16 October 2018, it was further reported that the son of the founder and former CEO of the bank, Dr Kwabena Duffuor II was suing KPMG and some of its staff accusing them of deceit and deliberately misleading the Bank of Ghana and government into collapsing the bank. Dr Kwabena Duffuor II alleges that KPMG's commercial interest in further work influenced its report to the government.

== See also ==
- List of banks in Ghana
- Economy of Ashanti
- Economy of Ghana
