= Bososo =

Coordinates: 06°18′00″N 00°25′00″W

Bososo is a town in the Fanteawka District in the Eastern Region, southern Ghana. It has a library.

== Transport ==
It is served by a station on the eastern mainline of the national rail network.

== See also ==
- Railway stations in Ghana
