= UT Bank =

Defunct Ghanaian bank

- Company type: Public company
- Industry: Financial services
- Founded: 2009
- Defunct: August 14, 2017
- Fate: License revoked and taken over
- Successor: GCB Bank
- Headquarters: Accra, Ghana
- Key people: Joseph Nsonamoah, chairman and co-founder; Prince Kofi Amoabeng, co-founder; Stephen Antwi-Asimeng, CEO
- Products: Loans, investments, corporate banking, international banking, commercial banking
- Revenue: ▲ Aftertax: US$6.93+ million (GHS:13.1 million) (2011)
- Total assets: US$378.4 million (GHS:712.9 million) (2011)

UT Bank (UTB), formally known as UT Bank Ghana Limited, was a commercial bank in Ghana until 2017 when its license was revoked by the Bank of Ghana due to severe impairment of their capital and was taken over by GCB Bank.

As of February 2011, the bank was one of the commercial banks licensed by Bank of Ghana, the national banking regulator. UTB was a medium-sized financial services provider headquartered in Ghana with subsidiaries in West Africa and Western Europe.

On August 14, 2017, the bank of Ghana announced it had revoked its license, together with Capital Bank. The bank was subsequently taken over by GCB Bank.

== History ==
In 1997, Joseph Nsonamoa and Prince Kofi Amoabeng co-founded Financial Services and then renamed it Unique Trust Financial Services. UT Financial Services was a non-bank financial services provider (NBFI) in Ghana, which was incorporated in 1997. Over time, the NBFI acquired subsidiaries and was listed on the Ghana Stock Exchange, under its holding company, UT Holdings Limited.

In 2008, UT (Unique Trust) Holdings Limited acquired majority shareholding in a Ghanaian commercial bank called BPI Bank. The bank was re-branded as UT Bank Ghana Limited and opened for business in May 2009.

In June 2010, UT Bank and UT Financial Services merged into one company called UT Bank Ghana Limited. Through a reverse listing on the Ghana Stock Exchange, the new bank's shares became listed and those of UT Holdings were de-listed. Its shares traded under the symbol UTB.

The bank's total assets in December 2011 were valued at approximately US$378.4 million (GHS:712.9 million), with shareholders' equity of approximately US$32.5 million (GHS:61.23 million).

On August 14, 2017, the Central Bank of Ghana issued a statement to the press indicating that the license of UT Bank had been revoked, along with that of another Ghanaian owned bank (Capital Bank). In the statement, the Central Bank also approved the take-over of UT Bank and Capital Bank by GCB Bank Limited. The first paragraph of the statement read, "The Bank of Ghana has approved a Purchase and Assumption transaction with GCB Bank Ltd that transfers all deposits and selected assets of UT Bank Ltd and Capital Bank Ltd to GCB Bank Ltd. The Bank of Ghana has revoked the Licences of UT Bank Ltd and Capital Bank Ltd. This action has become necessary due to severe impairment of their capital. The remaining assets and liabilities will be realised and settled respectively through a receivership process to be undertaken by Messers Vish Ashiagbor and Eric Nana Nipah of PricewaterhouseCoopers (PwC)".

On the same day, the Ghana Stock Exchange announced that it had suspended the listing of UT Bank indefinitely.

== Affiliate companies ==
The bank was a subsidiary of UT Holdings, which owns the following subsidiaries:

- UT Logistics - headquartered in Tema, Ghana
- UT Properties - real estate development and management
- UT Collections - debt recovery
- UT Private Security - armed and unarmed private security service
- UT Financial Services Nigeria - loans and lease financing solutions
- UT Financial Services South Africa - headquartered in Johannesburg
- UT Life Insurance - life insurance

== See also ==
- Economy of Ghana
- List of banks in Ghana
