= COVID-19 pandemic in Ghana =

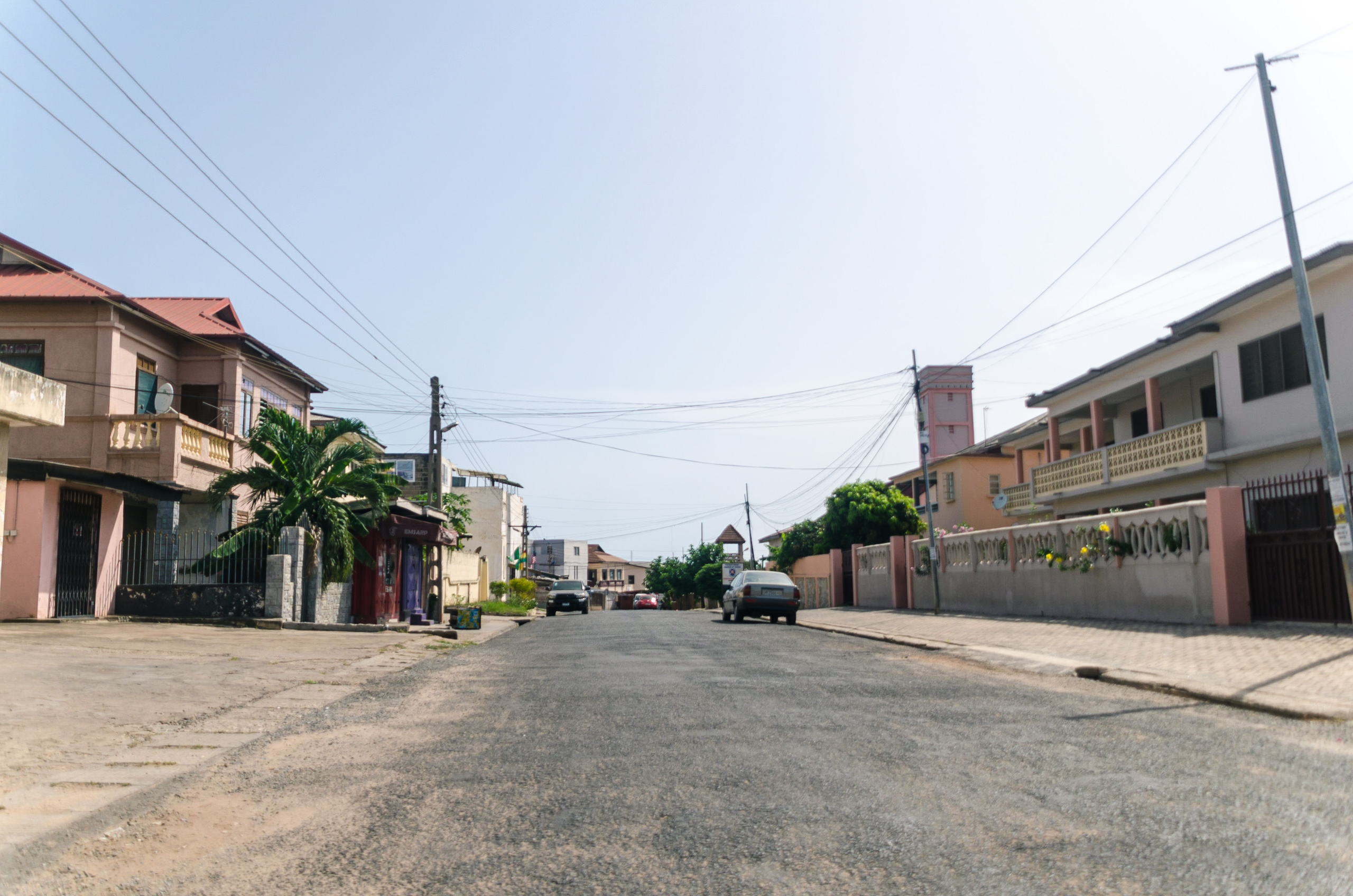
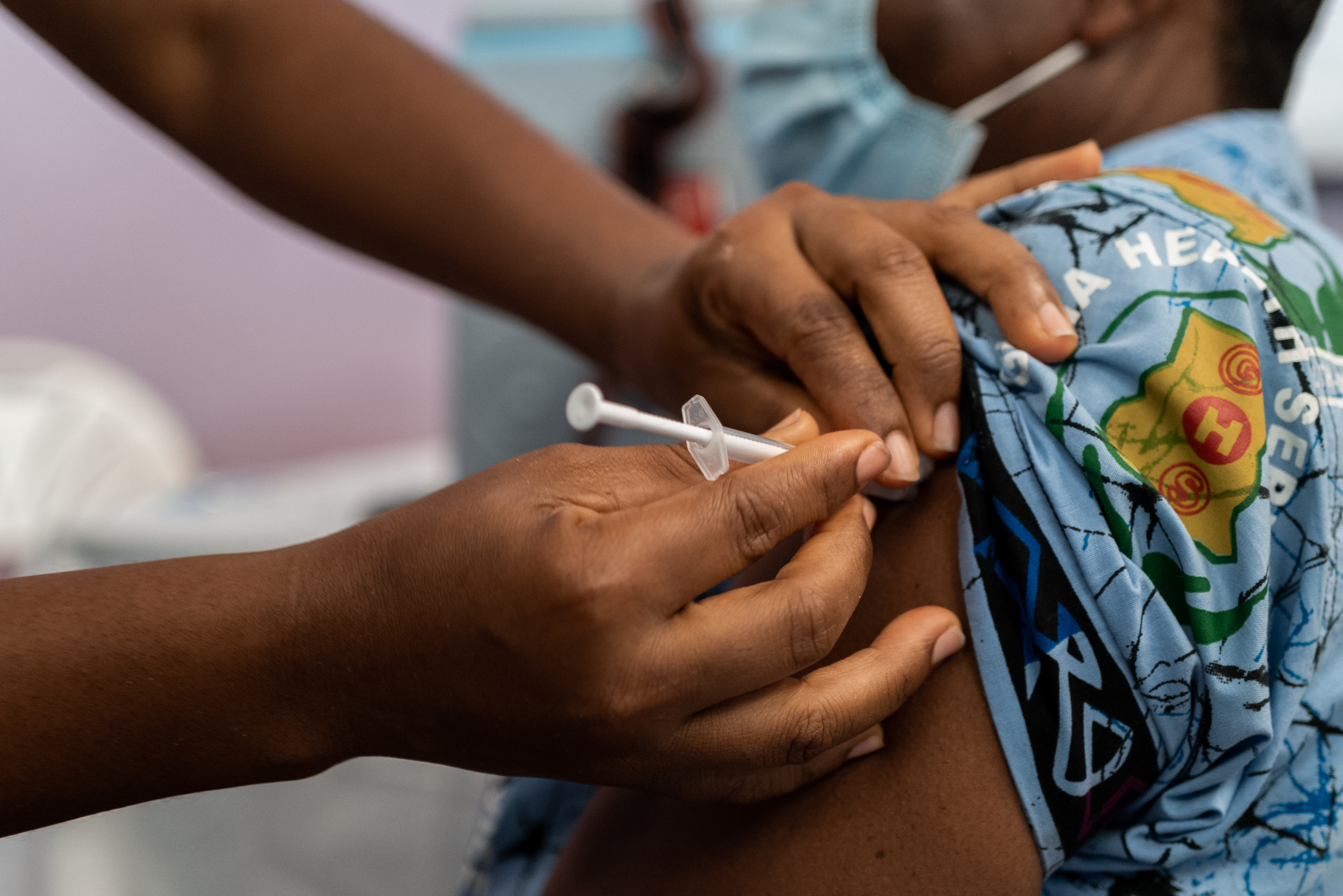
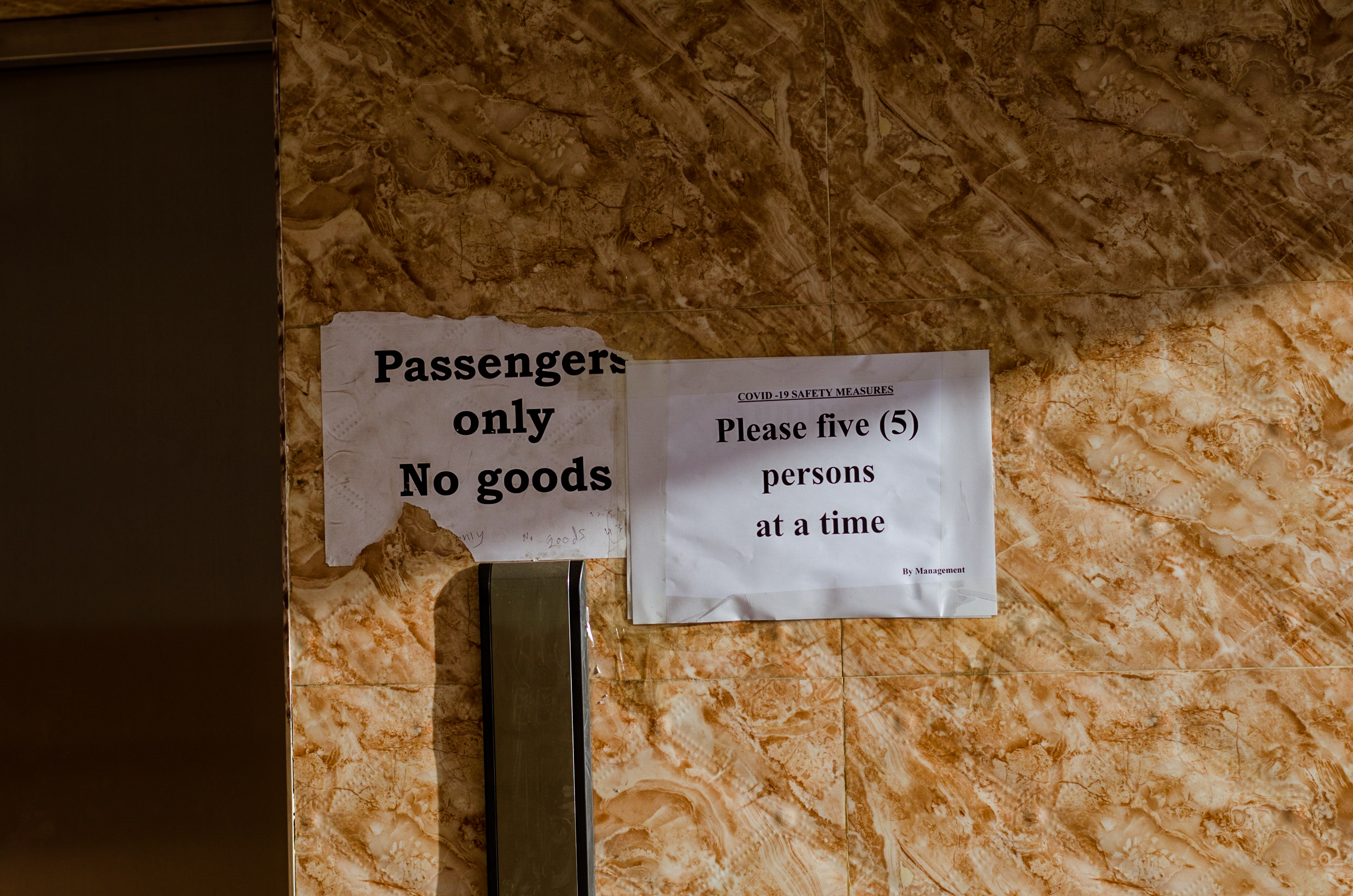
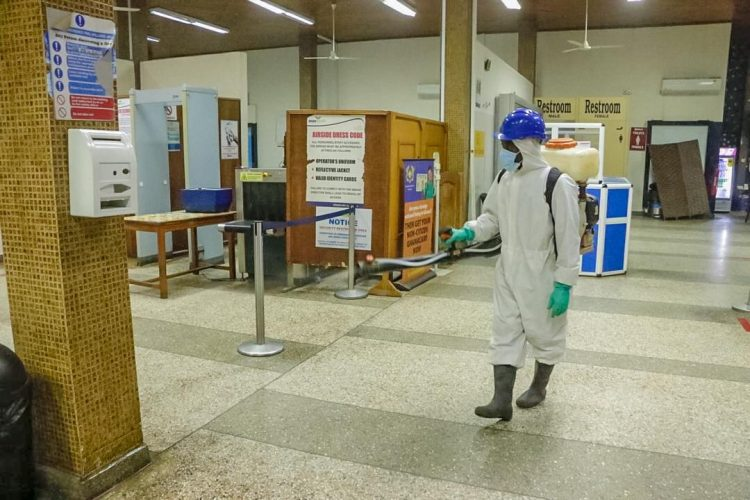
- Clockwise, from top: Empty streets in Accra following the lockdown, A shop in Accra facilitating social distancing protocols, Disinfection exercise at the Kumasi Airport, COVID-19 vaccination in Ghana.
- Disease: COVID-19
- Pathogen: SARS-CoV-2
- Location: Ghana
- First outbreak: Wuhan/China
- Index case: Accra
- Arrival date: 12 March 2020 (6 years, 7 months, 2 weeks and 2 days)
- Confirmed cases: 172,843 (updated 18 September 2026)
- Recovered: 165,153 (16 July 2022)
- Deaths: 1,463 (updated 18 September 2026)

Government website
- www.ghs.gov.gh/covid19/

The COVID-19 pandemic in Ghana was a part of the worldwide pandemic of coronavirus disease 2019 (COVID-19) caused by severe acute respiratory syndrome coronavirus 2 (SARS-CoV-2). The first two cases in Ghana were confirmed on 12 March 2020, when two infected people arrived in Ghana, one from Norway and the other from Turkey.

== Background ==
On 12 January 2020, the World Health Organization (WHO) confirmed that the novel coronavirus was the cause of a respiratory illness that affected a cluster of people in Wuhan, Hubei, China. This was reported to the WHO on 31 December 2019. On 11 March 2020, the World Health Organization declared the novel COVID-19 a pandemic.

== Timeline and highlight of events ==
Some of the highlights of events over the months after Ghana recorded its first case are mentioned below.

=== March 2020 ===
This month saw the first confirmed cases and an initial response from Ghana's government. Joint meetings among major stakeholders were conducted as well as training sessions organised for teachers and other professionals on how to handle suspected COVID-19 cases. Measures instituted by the President of Ghana on 15 March 2020 included bans on school activities and all social gatherings, and a temporary lockdown and restrictions of the movements of people in the Greater Accra and Ashanti Regions of Ghana.

==== Earliest reported cases ====
Greater Accra, Ashanti and Upper West regions recorded cases in the month of March. At an emergency press briefing on 12 March 2020, Health Minister Kwaku Agyemang-Manu announced Ghana's first two confirmed cases (in Accra). The two cases were people who returned to the country from Norway and Turkey which made them the first actual cases of COVID-19 in Ghana. These two cases initiated the first contact tracing process in Ghana. Of the first two cases reported in Ghana, one case was a senior officer at the Norwegian Embassy in Ghana who had returned from Norway; while the other was a staff member at the United Nations (UN) offices in Ghana who had returned from Turkey.

By the end of the month, there had been 152 confirmed cases, 5 deaths, and 22 recovered patients, leaving 125 active cases going into April.

==== Financial ====
Ghana's president Nana Akufo-Addo began delivering a series of state of the nation addresses concerning COVID-19 in March by announcing that the cedi equivalent of US$100 million would be made available to enhance Ghana's coronavirus preparedness and response plan. Parliament passed the Novel Coronavirus (COVID-19) National Trust Fund Act, 2020 (Act 1013) which set up a fund to receive and manage contributions and donations from individuals, groups and corporate bodies to support in the fight against the virus.

==== Bans and restrictions ====
Initially, the Government of Ghana banned all public gatherings including conferences, workshops, funerals, festivals, political rallies, church activities and other related events to reduce the spread of the virus. Beaches were also closed. Basic schools, senior high schools and universities, both public and private, were also closed. Only Basic Education Certificate Examination and West African Senior School Certificate Examination candidates were permitted to remain in school under social distancing protocols.

Traveling to Ghana from countries which had recorded over 200 positive COVID-19 cases was strongly discouraged with non-admittance of such travellers; this restriction did not however apply to Ghanaian citizens and people with resident permits.

All of the country's borders were later closed for two weeks from midnight of Sunday 22 March 2020. Passport services were also suspended.

On 30 March, the partial lockdown of Accra and Kumasi took effect. Members of the Executive, Legislature and the Judiciary; and some services such as those that were involved in the production, distribution and marketing of food, beverages, pharmaceuticals, medicine, paper and plastic packages, media and telecommunications were exempted from the restrictions.

==== Disinfection and fumigation ====
The Local Government Minister announces the disinfection of 137 markets in the Greater Accra Region.

==== Health services ====
On 26 March, 64 new cases were recorded increasing Ghana's case count to 132. On the same day, a letter written and signed by the director general of the Ghana Health Service Dr. Patrick Kuma-Aboagye recalled all staff on study leave into active service. This was to help accommodate the workload on health centres. A special life insurance cover for the professionals at the frontline dealing with the pandemic, was announced by the Ghana Health Ministry. The workers were insured under Group Life cover, with an assured sum of GHC 350,000 on each life.

=== April 2020 ===
==== Reported cases ====
For details see Timeline of the COVID-19 pandemic in Ghana.

During the month of April cases increased to 2,074 at the end of the month. Cases were confirmed in most of the regions of Ghana, with some coming from those entering via unapproved routes along the Ghana-Togo border. There were twelve more deaths in April, bringing the death toll to 17.

==== Disinfection and fumigation ====
There were several disinfection exercises of markets in the Northern, North East and Savannah regions as well as the Eastern Region. The Ministry of Local Government and Rural Development teamed up with Moderpest Company and Zoomlion Ghana for the exercise.

At a press briefing, the director-general of the Ghana Health Service (GHS) Patrick Kuma-Aboagye, reiterated President Nana Akufo-Addo's announcement to the commencement of local production of nose masks as part of efforts to arrest the spread of the pandemic.

The GES and ZGL also joined forces to launch an initiative to fumigate all senior high, special and technical schools in the country to curb the spread of the pandemic.

==== Bans and restriction ====
The border closure was extended by the president, for another two week effective midnight of Sunday 5 April 2020.

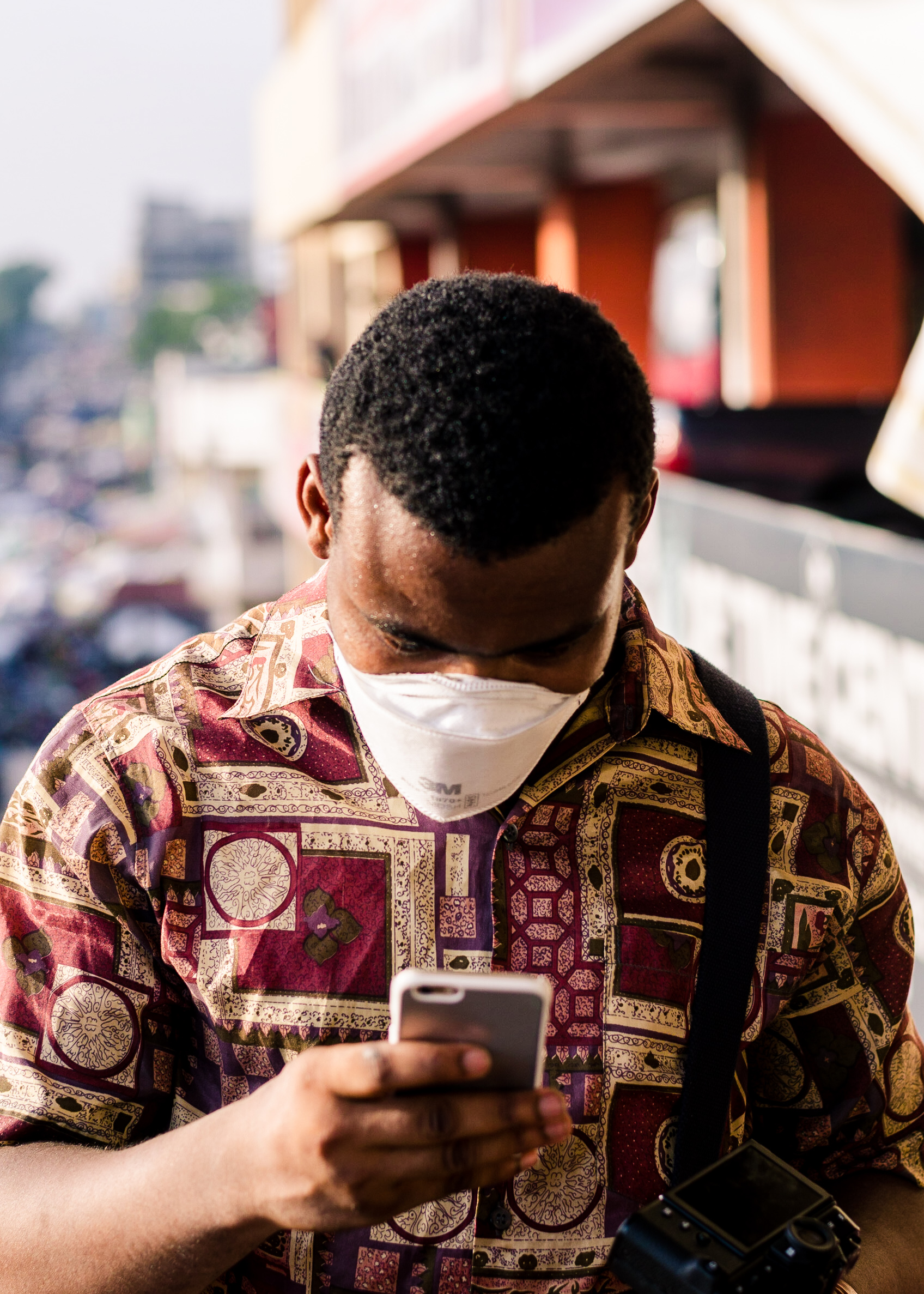
Wearing of face masks made mandatory

Mandatory use of masks was to be enforced by businesses and organizations.

=== May 2020 ===
==== Reported cases ====
For details see Timeline of the COVID-19 pandemic in Ghana.

The hotspots identified were in the Greater Accra, Ashanti and Central Regions. In Greater Accra, the Tema Metropolitan, Accra Metropolitan, Klottey Korle and Kpong Katamanso districts recorded the highest tallies with Tema taking the top position, followed by the Ablekuma, Okaikwei South and North, Ashiaman and Adenta areas as well as the Ga Central townships. In the Ashanti Region, Obuasi had the highest figures followed by Kumasi, Oforikrom, and Nkawie. Other areas were Old Tafo, Asokwa, Kumasi Municipal, Kumasi Metropolis and Suame which has high numbers as well. Komenda-Edina-Eguafo-Abbrem (KEEA) District, Cape Coast, and Ajumako are the districts with the high numbers in the Central Region.

695 persons tested positive at a fish-processing factory in Tema after a worker contracted the virus and infected over 500 workers there in a widely reported case of a super-spreader. All 1,300 staff of the company were tested, yet 95 percent of the affected persons recorded a first negative test.

On 29 May 2020, 50 workers at the Jubilee Field operated by Tullow Oil were confirmed to have tested positive for the virus.

There were 5,807 new cases in May, raising the total number of confirmed cases to 7,881. The death toll more than doubled to 36. There were 2,629 recoveries in May, bringing the total number of recovered patients to 2,841 and leaving 5,004 active cases at the end of the month.

==== Restrictions ====
- On 11 May 2020, the government of Ghana through the office of the Ghana Tourism Authority, gave hotels, bars and restaurants permission to reopen but to operate under enhanced social distancing procedures.
- In a televised address, the president extended the ban on social gatherings until the last day of May 2020. Private burials increased in Accra...due to ban on large funerals, lockdown. Nyarko-Yirenkyi, Anita Thursday, 2 April 2020
- Public transport vehicle operators were also given directives to enforce in vehicle physical distancing, while commuters were expected to use face masks within vehicles. Compliance to these directives was varied, with majority(98%) of bus operators adhering to the guidelines on physical distancing, although significant number of commuters were not adhering to the guidelines on face masks

=== June 2020 ===
==== Reported cases ====
For details see Timeline of the COVID-19 pandemic in Ghana.

- On 13 June, the Minister of Health tested positive for the disease and was admitted at the University of Ghana Medical Centre in Accra. A couple of days later the Minister of Information announced that the Minister of Health was now recuperating at home.
- The President also confirmed that the chief executive of the Sekondi-Takoradi Metropolitan Assembly, Kobina Kuretsi Sam, had died due to COVID-19.
- On 16 June, the CEO of the National Health Insurance Authority (NHIA), tested positive for the virus.
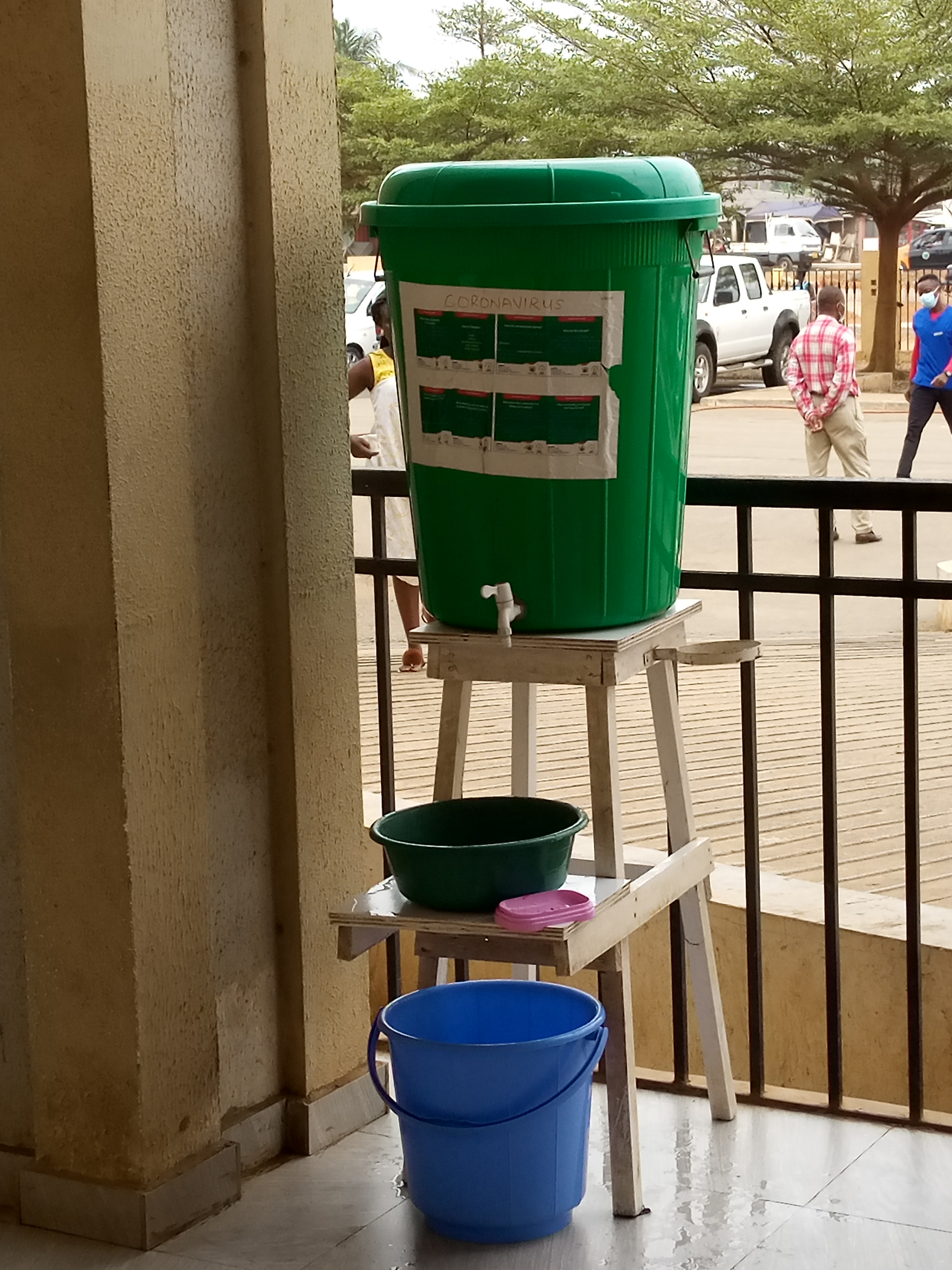
- Veronica Bucket, a bucket with a tap(spigot) attached mounted in many open spaces and at entrances for mandatory hand-washing.
  On 24 June, the Education Minister was detained at the UGMC over fears of the virus infection. He reported himself to the hospital when he felt unwell. Member of Parliament for Okere was admitted at the same facility with the Education Minister.
- There were 9,860 new cases in June, bringing the total number of confirmed cases to 17,741. The death toll more than tripled to 112. The number of recovered patients increased by 10,427 to 13,268 since the start of the outbreak, leaving 4,361 active cases at the end of the month.

==== Government responses ====
- With effect from the beginning of June there was some relaxation of restrictions. Religious services were allowed to commence effective Friday, 5 June, with mandatory use of nose masks and with congregations not exceeding 100. Private burials with a maximum attendance of 100 persons were allowed. Similarly weddings and other social gatherings could take place with no more than 100 people attending. Ghana's borders remained closed.
- The President announced that from the middle of June, final year students of junior high schools, senior high schools and universities could return to school. Final year students in many of the 234 tertiary institutions started returning to their respective campuses on 15 June for a few weeks of classes and final exams. Fumigation of all schools across the country also started with senior high schools expected to reopen on 22 June and junior high schools on 29 June.
- According to the new Executive Instrument, E.I. 164, signed by the President on 15 June 2020, people who refuse to wear face masks in public could face jail terms of between 4–10 years or a fine of between GHS12,000 (approx US$2,065) and GHS60,000 (approx US$10,320) or both would be made.
- The president approved the construction of additional Intensive Care Unit (ICU) bed facilities in the Greater Accra region to boost the country's COVID-19 case management. The president also confirmed there was an ongoing construction of a new treatment centre in the Ashanti region as part of efforts in the management of the disease cases in Ghana.
- Government calmed fears over the implementation of the new COVID-19 discharge policy which was in line with the WHO revised recommendations that allowed for asymptomatic COVID-19 patients to be discharged after 14 days without test.
- Government assured guidelines to be given to the Ghana Police Service on the mandatory wearing of face masks enforcement. Minister for Information said the communication from the police hierarchy would address the confusion that the enforcement plan might have caused.
- Government asked institutions to strengthen safety measures to halt the spread of COVID-19 disease among staffs. This was said by the Information Minister at a press conference in Accra.
- Ghana Water Company Limited announced that the three months of "free water" announced by the Ghana Government in April would end on 30 June 2020.

=== July 2020 ===
==== Reported cases ====
For details see Timeline of the COVID-19 pandemic in Ghana.

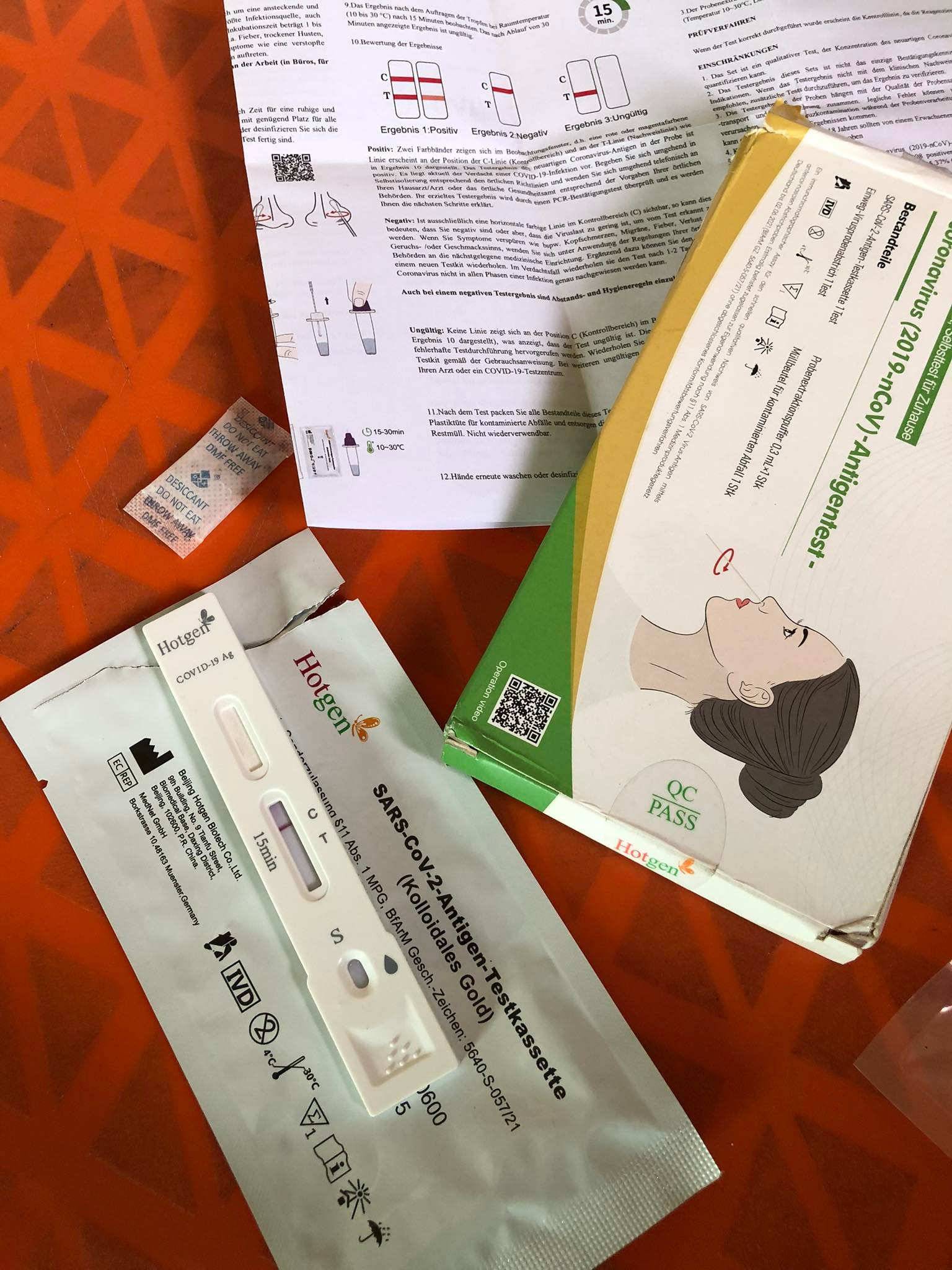
COVID-19 Antigen Self Test Kit

- A former general secretary of the New Patriotic Party died after testing positive for COVID-19 at the Intensive Care Unit of Korle-Bu Teaching Hospital. Campaign manager for New Patriotic Party and the Deputy Minister for Trade and Industry tested positive for COVID-19 and were admitted at the Korle-Bu Teaching Hospital. It was later confirmed the former Deputy Minister of Trade recovered from the virus.
- A Consultant Surgeon of the Trust Hospital died after testing positive for COVID-19. He is the fourth medical doctor to die from the disease in Ghana.
- The president of Ghana, Nana Akufo-Addo went to a 14-day self isolation after a person within his close circle tested positive for COVID-19. Six Accra Girls SHS students tested positive for COVID-19. The president completed his two weeks self-isolation of the coronavirus.
- The Korle-Bu Teaching Hospital announced the suspension of non-emergency surgical cases for two weeks to protect clients and staff from been infected with COVID-19. It was also confirmed a teacher of Accra Girls School and the spouse tested positive for COVID-19.
- Senior Minister of Ghana tested positive for COVID-19 and was confirmed by the Information Minister. The director general of GHS said measures were underway to track suspected cases of COVID-19 disease in some Senior High Schools in Ghana. The Senior Minister later tested negative for the virus after he went under self-isolation.
- Scientists called for review of COVID-19 safety protocols after there was an evidence that the virus could be spread in the air. The Education Minister was discharged after testing positive for the disease.
- 55 persons tested positive for COVID-19. It was confirmed at the Accra Girls SHS by the authorities. Seven out the 55 persons who tested positive recovered and were discharged.
- A JHS in the Oti region recorded a case of COVID-19.
- According to the Education Directorate, 62 COVID-19 cases were recorded in seven schools in Greater-Accra. 10 SHS students tested positive for COVID-19 in the Ahafo region. Six students recovered from the virus in Ahafo region.
- 6 SHS in Western region recorded COVID-19 cases.
- Dr Da Costa Aboagye, the director of health promotion of the Ghana Health Service, on 19 July 2020 said in a report that four months after the country recorded its first coronavirus case, cases has exceeded 27,000.
- On July 21, the MP for Assin Central, Kennedy Agyapong revealed he tested positive for COVID-19 after he celebrated his 60th birthday on 16 June 2020.
- According to the Deputy Minister of Health, 178 cases of COVID-19 were confirmed both in the JHS and SHS and eight recoveries. He also claimed from May 2020, FLY Zipline Ghana Limited delivered 2,573 COVID-19 samples to the NMIMR and the KCCR.
- UMat in Ghana became the latest school that recorded COVID-19 case in the Western region.
- The Chief Justice returned to office after he went for 14days isolation from the public. The Deputy Trade Minister went into self-isolation after he was unwell in compliance with the COVID-19 protocols.
- The number of confirmed cases doubled in July, to 35,501. The death toll increased by 70 to 182. There were 18,828 more recoveries, bringing the total number of recovered patients to 32,096. There were 3,223 active cases at the end of the month.

==== Government response ====
- As part of efforts to ensure management of COVID-19 cases in Accra, the Metropolitan Assembly announced that it planned to construct an isolation centre at Kaneshie Polyclinic.
- Government has set aside 80million Ghana cedis to pay front line health workers' incentive package as part of Ghana's COVID-19 pandemic preparedness.
- According to the Information minister, Government considered options in curbing the spread of COVID-19 disease.
- Government said it has embarked on the expansion of COVID-19 treatment centres across Ghana. This is to make available more logistics and beds for COVID-19 management.
- Government deployed over 200 personnel to monitor COVID-19 cases in senior high schools.
- Ghana's Supreme Court adjourned all cases which were scheduled in July.
- Government considered inspection of offices to enforce COVID-19 safety protocols. The speaker of parliament threatened to sanction parliamentary members who breached COVID-19 protocols.
- A former president claimed Government bungled up the national response to the COVID-19 pandemic.
- The COVID-19 National Trust Fund spent over 32million Ghana cedis to aid in the fight against COVID-19 in Ghana.
- The Coordinator of Ghana's COVID-19 testing program claimed Ghana's testing capacity was back after laboratory equipment and supplies were delivered. GHS called on stakeholders to focus on active COVID-19 cases and not cumulative cases. The Minister for Information discredited claimed the government's response strategy to COVID-19 failed. The government distributed 50,000 PCR testing kits and other kits to COVID-19 testing facilities across Ghana.
- Government spent US$35million on testing for COVID-19 suspected cases. This amount was not part of the expenditure on the expansion of testing capacity according to the Deputy Health Minister.
- The Finance Minister claimed in his report that the government spent about 54.3 million Ghana cedis to provide cooked and uncooked food to the vulnerable during the three-week lockdown. He also claimed Government would provide free electricity and water for the rest of 2020.

==== Disinfection and fumigation ====
- The Ministry of Local Government and Zoomlion began the first phase of the nationwide disinfection and fumigation on the
- Ministry of Local Government and Zoomlion began the second phase of nationwide disinfection and fumigation exercise. Some markets in Accra were used for the exercise.
- Government disinfected markets, public places etc. in the Upper West region as part of efforts in fighting the spread of the virus.
- The COVID-19 National Trust Fund gave GHS6.8 million to the Ghana COVID-19 Private Sector Fund to be given to the GIDC.

==== Bans and restrictions ====
- The president lifted the ban on COVID-19 related restrictions on transport operators by allowing them to operate to full capacity. He also lifted restrictions on tourist sites in the country. He further eased restrictions on religious worships in the country. The cap on the number of worshippers which was initially 100 people was removed. The President Nana Addo Dankwa Akufo-Addo increased the duration from one hour to two hours, taking effect on Saturday, 1 August 2020. He further claimed Ghana's border closure still stands despite easing some COVID-19 restrictions.

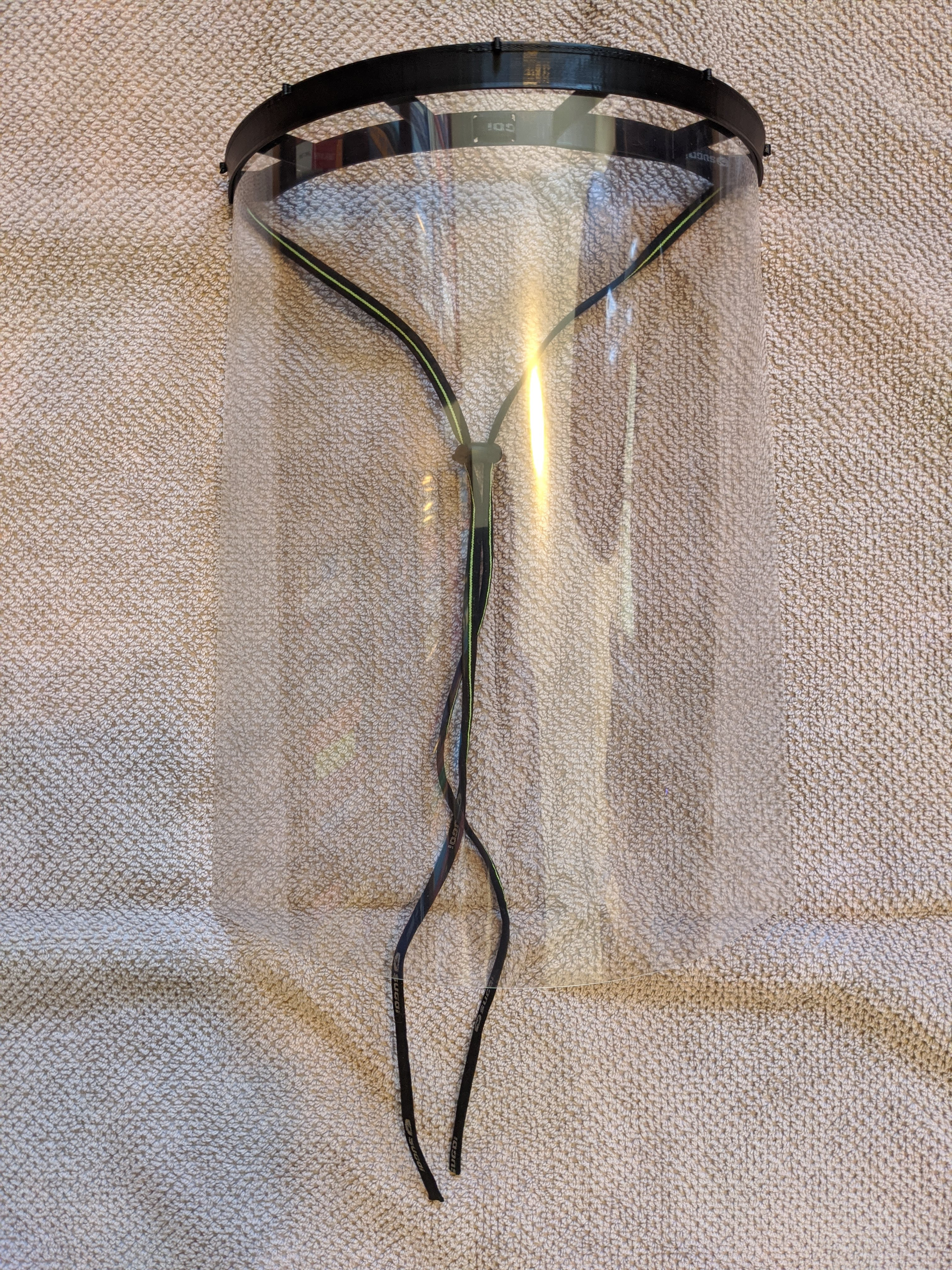
Face Shield

=== August 2020 ===
==== Reported cases ====
For details see Timeline of the COVID-19 pandemic in Ghana

- On 2 August, according to the acting chief medical officer of Barbados, Dr. Kenneth Georgeit nine out of the 95 Ghanaian nurses who traveled to Barbados to work for two years have tested positive for COVID-19.
- Ghana recorded 798 new cases of COVID-19 and nine persons died from the virus.
- On 5 August, Ghana recorded eight new death cases hence a total of 199 death cases in the country. Also, we recorded 574 new active cases pushing the total case count to 39,075.
- On 6 August, Ghana recorded 567 new COVID-19 cases. Clinical recoveries rose to 36,384 and out of this number, eight are in a critical condition, four on ventilators, and 22 in severe condition.
- On 7 August, Ghana recorded 455 new positive cases therefore increasing the country's case count to 40,097. Eight new deaths have also been recorded, pushing the number of deaths from the virus to 206.
- 436 new COVID-19 cases recorded on 8 August 2020 had come from samples that were taken between 17 July and 4 August 2020. Also, 7 persons were recorded to have died according to the Ghana Health Service (GHS).
- On 9 August, Ghana recorded 470 new cases pushing COVID-19 cases to 41,003. Also, 9 deaths were recorded hence a total of 215.
- On 13 August, 39,718 persons clinically recovered and were discharged.
- Eight deaths were recorded on 15 August. This gives a total of 231 death cases.
- Death cases increased to 248 with nine deaths and 340 new COVID-19 cases recorded on 18 August.
- 101 new cases recorded on 19 August with eight death cases. This brings a total of active cases to 1,875.
- On 20 August, Ghana's recoveries and discharges rose to 41,279 while the number of deaths increased from 256 to 261, with the latest death being recorded on 13 August.
- 180 new COVID-19 cases were recorded on 24 August.
- There were 8,797 new cases in August, bringing the total number of confirmed cases to 44,298. The death toll rose by 94 to 276. The number of recovered patients grew by 10,867 to 42,963, leaving 1,059 active cases at the end of the month.

==== Economic impact ====
- A new COVID-19 Business Tracker Survey conducted by the Ghana Statistical Service (GSS), in collaboration with the UNDP, and the World Bank showed that about 770,000 workers (25.7% of the total workforce), had their wages reduced and about 42,000 employees were laid off during the country's COVID-19 partial lock-down.

==== Government responses ====
- Government claimed it was not relenting in its efforts to ensure people abide by the law that criminalizes the act of not using face masks. Parliament of Ghana approved a tax waiver on income taxes of GHS174 million cedis (equivalent to US$30 million) for front line health workers.
- The Parliament of Ghana has granted a tax waiver of GHS174 million cedis on income taxes of frontline workers. This spans for three months thus July, August and September 2020.
- President Nana Akufo-Addo chose 1 September 2020 as the date to reopen the borders which have been closed due to the outbreak of COVID-19 in Ghana.
- Data from the NBSSI indicated that about 120,000 out of the over 700,000 who applied for the CAP Business Support Program were said to have received financial support.
- Government claimed it spent over GH¢76 million in the disinfection, fumigation and cleaning-up of markets, lorry parks and other social amenities across the country.

=== September 2020 ===
==== Reported cases ====
For details see Timeline of the COVID-19 pandemic in Ghana.

- There were 2,184 new cases in September, bringing the total number of confirmed cases to 46,482. The death toll rose to 301. The number of recovered patients increased to 45,651, leaving 530 active cases at the end of the month.

==== Economic impact ====
- The Ministry of Finance claimed there was an increase in cost of servicing the national debt which was caused by the shock brought about by COVID-19 which caused revenues to fall.
- The Finance Minister claimed there is a possible post-COVID-19 economic recovery and attainment of SDGs with digitization, increase in private capital etc.
- The Governor of the BoG claimed the economy of Ghana began to experience some recovery as price pressures which was a result of the COVID-19 pandemic restrictions and lockdown.
- GSS revealed in a survey that about 90 per cent of businesses in Ghana recorded low sales during the lockdown period.

==== Government responses ====
- Government relaunched the GH COVID-19 tracker app after it was launched on 13 April.
- The president disclosed that the government, through the MoE, planned a relief package for private schools who were affected by COVID-19 induced shutdown of schools.
- According to the Deputy Minister of Health, the state would bear the cost of treatment for passengers who tested positive for COVID-19.
- The MoE partnered with UNESCO to ensure all Ghanaians are educated on the COVID-19 pandemic by using local dialects on the International Literacy Day.
- The Minister of Employment and Labor Relations claimed government's intervention in easing of restrictions restored over 2,849 out of the over 11,000 job losses due to the pandemic.
- Government established a committee to bring about modalities to implement the National Unemployment Insurance Scheme to help those who lost their jobs during the pandemic.
- Government extended the free water package to the end of 2020 due to COVID-19.
- The President donated 10,000 beds to the MoH for distribution to health centres across Ghana.
- Government supported entrepreneurs with disability in the Northern, North East and Savannah regions with an amount of GH¢200,000 to help them in their businesses due to the impact of COVID-19.
- According to the Information Minister, Government took note of new waves of the virus in Europe and the US. He also called on Ghanaians to keep on adhering to the COVID-19 protocols to prevent a new wave of infections. He also claimed that the testing regime that was used at KIA would help prevent the importation of the virus.
- Government released packages to partners in the Tourism industry and other businesses to help them against the pandemic.
- According to the Deputy Minister for Foreign Affairs, 2,262 Ghanaians in Lebanon were evacuated during the COVID-19 lockdown and an amount of $1,062,600 was spent.
- The vice president claimed government considered providing financial support to private schools who were affected by the COVID-19 pandemic.

==== Bans and restrictions ====
The President extended the Executive Instrument by making compulsory the wearing of face masks. He also lifted the ban on football as he announced Ghana's Premier League and another league resumes in October, 2020. According to the President, beaches, cinemas nightclubs and pubs should still be closed due to COVID-19.

The Ghana Women's Premier League was set to begin in January 2021 after the government placed a ban on all football related activities in March 2020 due to COVID-19.

=== October 2020 ===
==== Reported cases ====
For details see Timeline of the COVID-19 pandemic in Ghana

The GHS claimed there was no COVID-19 death recovered in Ghana in the month of October.

==== Economic impacts ====
- According to executive secretary of Chamber of Petroleum Consumers, consumers were expected to buy fuel at a lower cost due to the outbreak of COVID-19 which has affected global oil markets.
- The deputy governor of BoG claimed COVID-19 impacted the compelling of central banks to implement extra responses.
- Finance ministers in Africa asked for about US$300 billion to accelerate economic recovery and other factors for vulnerable countries.
- Traders in some parts of the country blamed the increment of foodstuffs to the outbreak of the pandemic.
- Community and Rural banks were commended for applying strategies to remain resilient during the pandemic.
- A rating from an American agency claimed the country's economy experienced a shock after the outbreak of the pandemic and has also worsened the already low public finances of the country.
- The President claimed the economy of Ghana bounced back 'strongly'.
- IMF cautioned Ghana and other African countries on debts due to the crisis caused by the pandemic.
- According to the GIPC, the country clearly cruised from the impacts of the pandemic compared to other countries.
- Figures from the GSS claimed the country's economy fall was a result of restrictions caused by the outbreak of COVID-19.

==== Government responses ====
- Government released some packages to partners in the tourism industry and others to help their businesses because of the effects of the pandemic.
- Government's CAP BuSS was claimed to have created jobs mainly owned by the youth from the impact of the pandemic.
- Government pleaded with Chiefs to lead the Community Engagement and Risk Education strategy to create more awareness on corona virus and adherence of the protocols.
- The government with the effort of Ministry of Business Development collaborated with other organizations to launch the post-COVID-19 business recovery initiative.
- Government with the support of WFP disbursed an amount of GH¢11 million to vulnerable people in three regions in the country.
- The President said Ghana would not increase the COVID-19 test period for travelers to the country. He also claimed Government expanded testing facilities for the virus to private hospitals and others.
- Government launched an amount to aid banks in Ghana to give financial help to SMEs for their recovery from the shocks of the pandemic.
- Government lifted the number of persons who could go to events etc.
- The Government through the Deputy Minister for Trade claimed about 18.8million face masks were manufactured in the country, and also more than 10,000 jobs were created locally for PPE production.
- Government claimed Ghana's health system improved because of the fight against COVID-19 and would further invest in the health sector.
- Government claimed it spent about GHc 11.788 billion and created more than 350,000 jobs across Ghana and also saved $16.8 million.
- Government with the GFA begun the COVID-19 testing of players and club members.
- Government through the MoTI partnered with the nation's Chamber of Pharmacy to launch the COVID-19 Support Measures at the pharmaceutical sector.
- Government supported over 10,000 SMEs in the Volta region who were affected by the pandemic under the CAP BuSS distributed by the NBSSI.

==== Bans and restrictions ====
- The president of the Creative Arts Council, Mark Okraku-Mantey cautioned against those who are pushing for the reopening of night clubs in Ghana.
- The NCCE urged the Ghana Police Service to be vigilant in enforcing the law on the compulsory wearing of face masks in Ghana.
- Beaches across the country were claimed to have been deserted as part of the measures taken by the government to help the prevent the spread of the virus.
- The Minister for Information said cinemas and night clubs are high-risk places for the spread of the virus.
- The Accra Sport Stadium was set to accommodate 9,500 supporters for the 2020–21 GPL because of COVID-19 restrictions.
- The National Film Authority-Action Group pleaded with the President to lift the ban on cinemas.

=== November 2020 ===
==== Reported cases ====
- Ghana's case count saw a sharp increase of active cases.
- Ghana's COVID-19 infections passed 50,000. At the end of November the total number of cases stood at 51,667, an increase by 3,612 during the month. The death toll rose by three to 323.
- Ghana's COVID-19 active cases declined slightly.
- Ghana's COVID-19 active cases began to drop.

For details see Timeline of the COVID-19 pandemic in Ghana

==== Economic impacts ====
- A union in the country claimed the pandemic disrupted Ghana's economy and placed threats to lives and livelihoods.
- An economist claimed the effect of COVID-19 on economies might go beyond a century.
- A research conducted by AGI revealed about 89% of businesses were affected by COVID-19.
- According to the Finance Minister, about 19 SOEs lost about GH¢1.6 billion because of the pandemic.
- Ghana's maritime sector was disrupted by the pandemic as it impacted the shipping industry with drops in imports and exports.
- An economist blamed the Government for Ghana's economic difficulties and claimed it was not due to the pandemic.
- The Governor of BoG said the government was approaching the limits of the COVID-19 interventions.
- The pandemic caused the increase in Ghana's public debt.
- The private sector was claimed to have grown at a fast pace as the economy of Ghana was recovering from COVID-19 effects.

==== Government responses ====
- Government was appealed by the Pharmaceutical Society of Ghana to give insurance packages to families of pharmacists who passed during COVID-19.
- Government received financial support from a foundation to provide systems in the fight against COVID-19.
- Government planned to enhance ways of tracing, testing and treatment to stop the renewed threat of COVID-19, and also the release of logistics to help in the process of contact tracing.
- Government also extended the relief packages for health workers until the end of the year.
- Government claimed a 100-bed Infectious Disease Centre would be opened to help fight against the virus.
- Government was claimed to have engaged NMIMR and other pharmaceutical institutions to produce herbal medicine.
- Government launched the Ghana CARES Program for economic transformation post COVID-19.
- Government in collaboration with UNICEF and MasterCard Foundation launched the COVID-19 Education Recovery and Resilience Program.

==== Bans and restrictions. ====
- A research fellow at UG dismissed the suggestions of locking down some parts of Ghana.
- The general secretary of GHS warned the government might be forced to declare another lockdown if Ghana's cases continue to rise.
- The GMA cautioned there was likely for the country to go on another lockdown if COVID-19 cases continue to rise.

==== Disinfection and fumigation ====
- Government under the Ministry of Local Government and Rural Development began the third phase of the national market disinfection exercise to control the spread of the virus.
- The Regional Deputy Minister for Savannah region claimed the disinfection activities has helped in the fight against the pandemic.
- Markets and lorry stations were disinfected in the Upper West region to stop the spread of the virus.
- Lorry parks and marketplaces were disinfected in the Volta region to halt the spread of COVID-19. Markets in Bimbilla and Yendi were also disinfected.
- Markets in the Bolgatanga municipal were also disinfected. Markets and lorry stations in the Oti region were also fumigated.

==== Financial response ====
- The Chairperson of the COVID-19 National Trust Fund claimed the firm is in need of funds to undertake its duties.
- The Minister for Gender, Children and Social Protection claimed Government would provide some cash transfers to persons in poverty as a COVID-19 relief measure.

=== December 2020 ===
==== Reported cases ====
For details see Timeline of the COVID-19 pandemic in Ghana

- Ghana's active cases passed 52,500.
- It was claimed there was an increase of COVID-19 cases in 5 municipalities and districts in Bono East region.
- It was revealed the Greater Accra region remained the hot spot for the virus in Ghana.
- 11 people were claimed to be intense conditions and one person was in a crucial state.
- The GHS claimed COVID-19 infections were increasing but not at alarming rate.

==== Government responses ====
- Government through the MOYS donated GH¢1 million to the GFA to help football clubs playing behind closed doors due to COVID-19.
- The President Nana Akufo-Addo addressed the nation on ways to fight the pandemic. He claimed the country was making plans to procure the COVID-19 vaccine.
- The National COVID-19 Trust Fund donated an amount and a pick-up to the NCC to help it carry out educating the public on the pandemic.
- The Minister for Employment and Labor Relations claimed an amount of GH¢320 million was spent on health workers as part of the government's COVID-19 relief package.
- Ghana was claimed to lay hold of the delivery of the COVID-19 vaccine before the end of the first quarter of 2021.
- Government revealed it had plans to renew the Imposition of Restrictions Act, 2020, which allowed the government to impose the COVID-19 restrictions.
- The National COVID-19 Trust Fund claimed a total of GHS 57million was received from donations and provided over GHS 40million for the buying of PPEs for health institutions.
- According to the Information Minister, the President was to meet a cabinet to discuss on the reopening of schools.

==== Economic impacts ====
- The Governor of BoG claimed the effects of the pandemic might result in the increase of NPLs among banks in the country.
- The GIPC partnered a business group to produce some steps when taken would boost Ghana's business environment.
- The GSS released information on the economy's performance preparing for post-COVID-19 recovery.
- It was claimed Ghana's economy experienced a recession due to the impact of the pandemic.
- The Governor of BoG claimed the impact of Ghana's economy and the pandemic would be felt after the world reached herd immunity.

==== Bans and restrictions ====
- The health advisor to the president said football games would still be played behind closed doors.
- More than 50 travelers were captured at the land borders of Ghana using illegal routes as the borders were still closed.
- The President in his address to the nation claimed beaches, cinemas, pubs and nightclubs should remain closed, and also the land and sea borders of Ghana should remain closed.
- GTA cautioned it would deal with anyone flouting the COVID-19 laid down protocols.

==== Disinfection and fumigation ====
- The Kumasi Airport was disinfected during the third phase of the exercise by Zoomlion Ghana Limited.
- KIA was disinfected as part of Ghana's effort to fight the pandemic.

==== Financial ====
- It was projected that financial metrics of banks in the country would face reversals among others due to the impact of the pandemic.

=== January 2021 ===
==== Reported cases ====
For details see Timeline of the COVID-19 pandemic in Ghana

- President Akufo-Addo made his 21st address to the nation on the fight against COVID-19. He claimed Ghana was expecting to receive a delivery of the COVID-19 vaccine. He also revealed 712 positive cases were recorded at KIA.
- The President claimed there was no food shortages during the COVID-19 pandemic.
- A member of the country's COVID-19 response team claimed Ghana would make sure the vaccines are safe for Ghanaians.
- The Director of NMIMR claimed the rise in COVID-19 infections was due to the non-adherence of the safety protocols.
- Accra was said to have over 50% of Ghana's COVID-19 active cases as at 10 January 2021.
- The President disclosed the new strain of COVID-19 was recorded in the country. The CDC also disclosed the new 501.V2 variant was in Ghana.
- The Volta region was claimed to have recorded 37 COVID-19 cases in 2 weeks.

==== Government responses ====
- Government was claimed to embark on a series of COVID-19 sensitization campaigns. It also extended the free usage of water and electricity for 3 months. The ECG published some guidelines for the implementation of the extension of electricity usage.
- Government would bear the cost of the COVID-19 isolation and treatment of passengers at KIA upon arrival.
- Government partnered with Zoomlion to exhibit machines for nationwide spraying in the fight against the virus.
- Government through GHS decided to provide PPEs, hygiene materials and fumigate schools for the health and safety of students. Government was claimed to monitor schools to curb the spread of COVID-19.
- Government provided about 10 million hand sanitizers to school children.
- The President claimed the committee deciding on the COVID-19 vaccine were done with their work. Representative of the President claimed there would be a vaccine roll-out in the country. He also claimed the government would do all it can to protect school children. He also claimed negotiations would be done with an international pharmaceutical companies to secure a COVID-19 vaccine for the country.
- The COVID-19 Trust Fund was claimed to have received about GH¢57.1 million in cash donations in December 2020.
- Government began distribution of 22 million PPEs and other items to schools.
- The President directed that the amount paid for testing of COVID-19 at KIA should be reduced.
- The government claimed it started meetings with some manufacturers in the country to develop locally made COVID-19 vaccines.

==== Bans and restrictions ====
- The President revealed there should be no mass gatherings in schools and also no sporting activities.
- An MP urged the President to open the land and sea borders of Ghana.
- The President told students not to make him shut down schools again as they return to school, he also claimed to reintroduce restrictions in case the country's COVID-19 cases keep on rising, he also claimed funerals, weddings and other events caused the rise of COVID-19.
- 5 Burkinabes were arrested for entering into Ghana using illegal routes. 16 foreigners were arrested for entering into the country through illegal routes.
- 97 people were arrested by the police for not putting on nose masks. 105 people were also arrested for failing to put on nose masks. 188 people were also arrested for mot putting on nose masks. 27 people were also arrested due to breaching of the protocols. 85 people were also arrested for violating the safety protocols. 52 people were also arrested for flouting the safety protocols. 85 persons were arrested for not wearing the nose masks at different places. About 52 persons who disregarded the safety protocols were processed for court.
- Government threatened to reintroduce restrictions to curb the spread of the virus. The President reintroduced the ban on social gatherings to halt the spread.
- The GFA asked Hearts of Oak to play matches in empty stadium after flouting the safety protocols.

==== Economic impacts ====
- The President claimed the government's decisions in response to the pandemic would help the economy.
- The economy was expected to rebound slowly due to the pandemic.
- The President claimed the partial lockdown affected the economy of Ghana.
- The President of GUTA claimed freight charges has gone high. Prices of nose masks in the country increased.
- Businesses in the country were afraid there might be a lockdown if COVID-19 cases continue to rise.
- A director claimed economic activities would be slowed if the country imposed a lockdown. He also claimed Ghana lacked the resources to embark on a lockdown.
- FDA were claimed to have registered locally made products despite the pandemic.
- Economy of Ghana was impacted by the pandemic as government total expenditure increased.
- The banking sector was claimed to be safe to face any shocks due to the pandemic.

==== Disinfection and fumigation ====
- Some schools in the Accra, North, Oti and Ahafo regions were disinfected as part of the measures to stop the spread of the virus.
- 37 Military Hospital closed down its unit for fumigation exercise.
- Zoomlion disinfected the Kumasi Airport. The GACL and MoA partnered with Zoomlion to disinfect KIA. Zoomlion also disinfected the Ghana Prisons Headquarters. They also disinfected the Nsawam Prisons. They also disinfected about 50 police stations in the Bono region.

==== Health Issues ====
- A Doctor at KATH claimed the rise in COVID-19 cases were due to non-compliance of the safety measures.
- The Ashanti Regional Health Directorate gave out guidelines on COVID-19 for parents, schools etc.
- The President appealed to laboratories who test COVID-19 cases to regularly update GHS on confirmed cases.
- A nurse revealed the Ga East Hospital was overwhelmed in the rise of COVID-19 cases.
- A US-based Ghanaian surgeon was claimed to complete a multi-million dollar pharmaceutical plant was it was stopped due to the pandemic.
- GMA appealed for health workers to volunteer to work at COVID-19 Treatment centres. It contradicted claims political parties can not be blamed for the rise in COVID-19 cases.
- The Head of Disease Surveillance claimed the over stretch on facilities was partly due to the review of the Service's guidelines of COVID-19 management.
- Nyaho Medical Centre decided to refer all non-COVID-19 patients to other hospitals.
- Some male patients were said to have difficulty in erection for sexual pleasure after recovering from the virus.

=== February 2021 ===
==== Reported cases ====
For details see Timeline of the COVID-19 pandemic in Ghana On 2 February, Ghana recorded 772 new COVID-19 cases pushing the total active case to 5,515. Eight new COVID-19 deaths raised the death toll to 424.

The FDA approved a herbal medicine for trials to treat the virus. The researchers were from the School of Public Health at KNUST. They later warned against the use of the herb as a remedy for COVID-19. Some traders in Accra expressed their views concerning the herb.

On 24 February, Ghana became the first country to receive COVID-19 vaccines by COVAX.

==== Government responses ====
- The President claimed about 17.6 million doses of the COVID-19 vaccine would be procured by June.
- The government outlined categories of people for the rollout of the vaccine. The government also was claimed to have put in place messaging systems on the virus to Ghanaians.
- The country was said to have made an AMC for about 2.4 million doses of a vaccine.
- The Minister for Foreign Affairs claimed there was a need for international cooperation to fight against COVID-19.
- The GSA claimed the government's EPI would be used in distributing the COVID-19 vaccine.
- Ambassador of Germany to Ghana claimed Germany gave COVID-19 relief items worth 25 million Euros to Ghana.
- Government was claimed to have ordered 355,000 of AstraZeneca vaccines. More than $200 million was spent for the procurement of the vaccine. Both AstraZeneca and Sputnik V were approved for use in the country.
- Government planned to build 111 district hospitals.
- Vaccine development committee was established by the government.
- Government paid for the conveyance and deployment of the COVID-19 vaccine.

==== Disinfection and fumigation ====
- The EPA head office was closed for disinfection.
- Zoomlion disinfected the GCGL office, they also disinfected some public institutions. ZGL disinfected police stations in some regions. Wa Airport was disinfected by ZGL.
- A researcher at the NMIMR urged ZGL to disinfect the facility monthly.

==== Bans and restrictions ====
- The GPRTU claimed the reimposing of distancing in vehicles would affect them. It was justified by the president's health advisor not to impose distancing in vehicles.
- The President in his address to the nation said beaches, night clubs, cinemas and pubs should be shut, he also urged workplaces to run on shift system.
- It was clarified that marriage ceremonies could be held but not full blown weddings.
- 83 people were arrested by the police in the Upper West for not putting on nose masks. The Police also arrested 24 people for going to night clubs and other places. 51 people were arrested for entering the country through illegal means. More than 150 people were arrested for entering into Ghana illegally.
- Pubs, cinemas and others disregarded the President's restrictions in some parts of Accra.
- GIS in the Upper West Region put in place measures to stop illegal entry into the country.

==== Economic impacts ====
- Some businesses counted the cost of the banning of social gatherings.
- GRA was claimed to have exceeded its tax target despite the pandemic.
- The BoG claimed the rise in COVID-19 cases would threaten the achievement of fiscal deficit by the government. It also claimed the new variant of COVID-19 could affect the recovery of the economy.
- The CEO of AGI claimed many businesses were affected by the pandemic in 2020.
- COVID-19 was claimed to have forced banks in Ghana to restructure loans made to businesses.
- The Goldman Sachs's Economics research wing claimed SSA countries could find it hard to escape the pandemic's economic impact.
- An economist claimed Ghana's economy would crumble if there was another lockdown.
- The MD of IMF claimed economies of African countries needed to reset to recover from the impact of the pandemic.

==== Finance ====
- MoF was claimed to have disbursed an amount to ECG and GWCL for part payment of the government's package.
- Government spent more than 4.7 billion Ghana cedis due to the pandemic.
- Ghana's financial markets were claimed to be reacting differently as initially expected.
- Banks in Ghana were said to have disbursed more than GH¢14 billion to businesses of Ghanaians since the outbreak of the pandemic.

==== Health Issues ====
- The CEO of a hospital revealed sex does not guard against COVID-19.
- COVID-19 was claimed to have affected the OD Free Campaign in the Upper West region.
- A doctor claimed the country could record cases of non-infectious disease because of post-COVID-19 complications.
- The impact of the virus on Cancer was claimed to have 'worse' outcomes, and also on the country's depleted blood banks.

==== Vaccine ====
- The UN-partnered COVAX initiative, which aims to provide equal vaccination for all, sent 600,000 doses of AstraZeneca/Oxford vaccine to Accra. Ghana became Africa's first nation to receive vaccines from the COVAX facility.

=== March 2021 ===
==== Reported cases ====
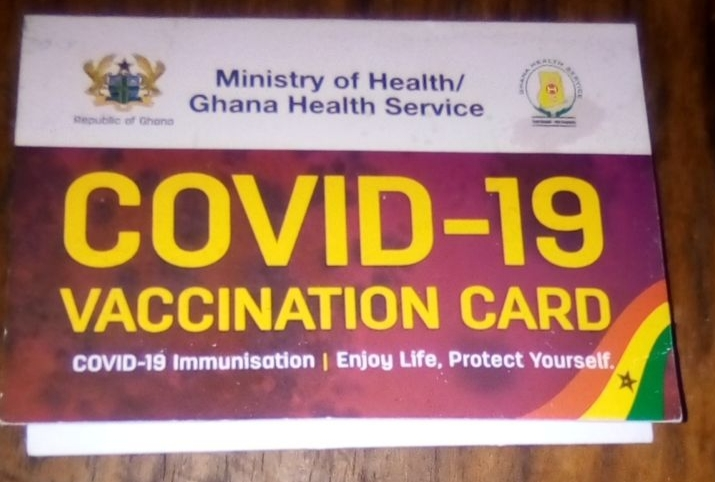
Vaccination card issued after taking the COVID-19 vaccine

For details see Timeline of the COVID-19 pandemic in Ghana

- 43 districts claimed to be hot spot of the spread of the virus would be vaccinated.
- On 2 March, the vaccination exercise began against the virus. 3,321 people were vaccinated on the first day of the vaccination exercise.
- MoH developed measures on how herbal medicines can be used for COVID-19 treatment.
- Volta region recorded the UK COVID-19 variant.
- On 18 March, it was reported the two variant were in the country.

==== Government responses ====
- Government revealed it would construct 14 treatment centres for medical waste disposal.
- Government revealed it would introduce a COVID-19 levy.
- Government set aside €890 million for the building of 33 health facilities.
- Government was said to start plans for post-COVID-19 recovery of the economy of Ghana.
- President Akufo-Addo claimed 42 million COVID-19 vaccines would be purchased by the government.
- Government secured and issued $3 billion since the onset of the pandemic.

==== Disinfection and fumigation ====
- Terminal 3 of Meridian Port Services was disinfected.
- GPS Hospital to close some departments for disinfection.

==== Bans and restrictions ====
- 80 Togolese were arrested for allegedly entering Ghana illegally. Another 80 immigrants were arrested in the Bono region.
- CEO of GTA entreated cinema owners in Ghana to bear with government due to the restrictions on mass gatherings.

==== Economic impacts ====
- A blueprint expected to place the country's economy on track was approved by a cabinet.
- Nana Akufo-Addo claimed the country's GDP was expected to rise due to the impact of the pandemic.
- Osei Kyei Mensah-Bonsu claimed Ghana's debt stock was due to the impact of the pandemic and others.
- The GH¢100 billion GhanaCARES was claimed to help Ghana turn the difficulties caused by the pandemic.

==== Finance ====
- Ghana was said to have recorded US$2,650.97 billion worth of FDI amid the pandemic.
- Ghana was claimed to lose GH¢18.9 billion and GH¢22 billion in revenues in 2021 and 2022 respectively, due to the impact of COVID-19 on the economy.

==== Health Issues ====
- Teenage pregnancy was claimed to have reduced in the Upper West region amid the pandemic.
- It was claimed by Dr. Akosua Owusu-Sarpong that the COVID-19 vaccine does not cause erectile dysfunction in males.
- The vaccine was claimed to be safe for nursing mothers.

=== April 2021 ===
==== Reported cases ====
For details see Timeline of the COVID-19 pandemic in Ghana

- More than 500,000 Ghanaians received the vaccine.

==== Government responses ====
- Government arranged with the Private Office of Sheikh Ahmed Dalmook Al Maktoum for the supply of 3.4 million doses of Sputnik V.

==== Bans and restrictions ====
- President Nana Akufo-Addo banned church activities and large gatherings during the Easter celebration.
- Henry Quartey ordered for the closure of all beaches.

==== Disinfection and fumigation ====
- About 12 football match centres were disinfected.

=== May 2021 ===
==== Reported cases ====
For details see Timeline of the COVID-19 pandemic in Ghana

==== Government response ====
- Government was claimed to explore the use of bio-metric solutions in the deployment of the COVID-19 vaccines.
- Nana Akufo-Addo claimed the country would receive 350,000 doses of the AstraZeneca.

==== Bans and restrictions ====
- GPS shut down the Fantasy Dome due to an event with no observance of the protocols, Later, an investigation was launched for the alleged gathering.
- Nana Akufo-Addo claimed travellers from Ghana should halt or postpone their trips to high-risk COVID-19 countries.

== Statistics ==
=== Charts ===
==== Confirmed new cases per day ====
View source data.

==== Deaths per day ====
View source data.

== Responses ==
=== Disinfection and fumigation ===
From 3 April, over 464 markets were disinfected across the country. The second phase of nationwide fumigation begun in July. On 23 September, the MoE with GES collaborated with Zoomlion to disinfect and fumigate all SHS across Ghana to pave way for the reopening of schools. Over 3700 schools in the Greater Accra alone, were fumigated. A disinfection company appealed to the government to train youth in the disinfection exercise.

=== Bans and lockdowns ===
On 15 March, at 10 pm, President Nana Akufo-Addo banned all public gatherings including conferences, workshops, funerals, festivals, political rallies, church activities and other related events to reduce the spread of COVID-19 at a press briefing on the state of COVID-19. Basic schools, senior high schools and universities, both public and private, have also been closed. Only BECE and WASSCE candidates were permitted to remain in school under social distancing protocols.

On 30 March, the partial lockdown of Accra and Kumasi took effect. Only Members of the Executive, Legislature and the Judiciary; and some services such as those that were involved in the production, distribution and marketing of food, beverages, pharmaceuticals, medicine, paper and plastic packages, media and telecommunications were exempted from the restrictions. In April 2020, At a press briefing, the director general of the Ghana Health Service, announced the commencement of local production of nose masks as part of efforts to arrest the spread of the pandemic. According to the new Executive Instrument, E.I. 164, signed by the President on 15 June 2020, people who refuse to wear face masks in public could face jail terms of between 4–10 years or a fine of between GHS12,000 (approx US$2,065) and GHS60,000 (approx US$10,320) or both would be made. This came after the mandatory wearing of nose masks Traveling to Ghana from countries which had recorded over 200 positive COVID-19 cases was strongly discouraged with non-admittance of such travelers; this restriction did not however apply to Ghanaian citizens and people with resident permits. All of the country's borders were later closed from midnight of Sunday 22 March. Passport services were also suspended.

=== Financial response ===
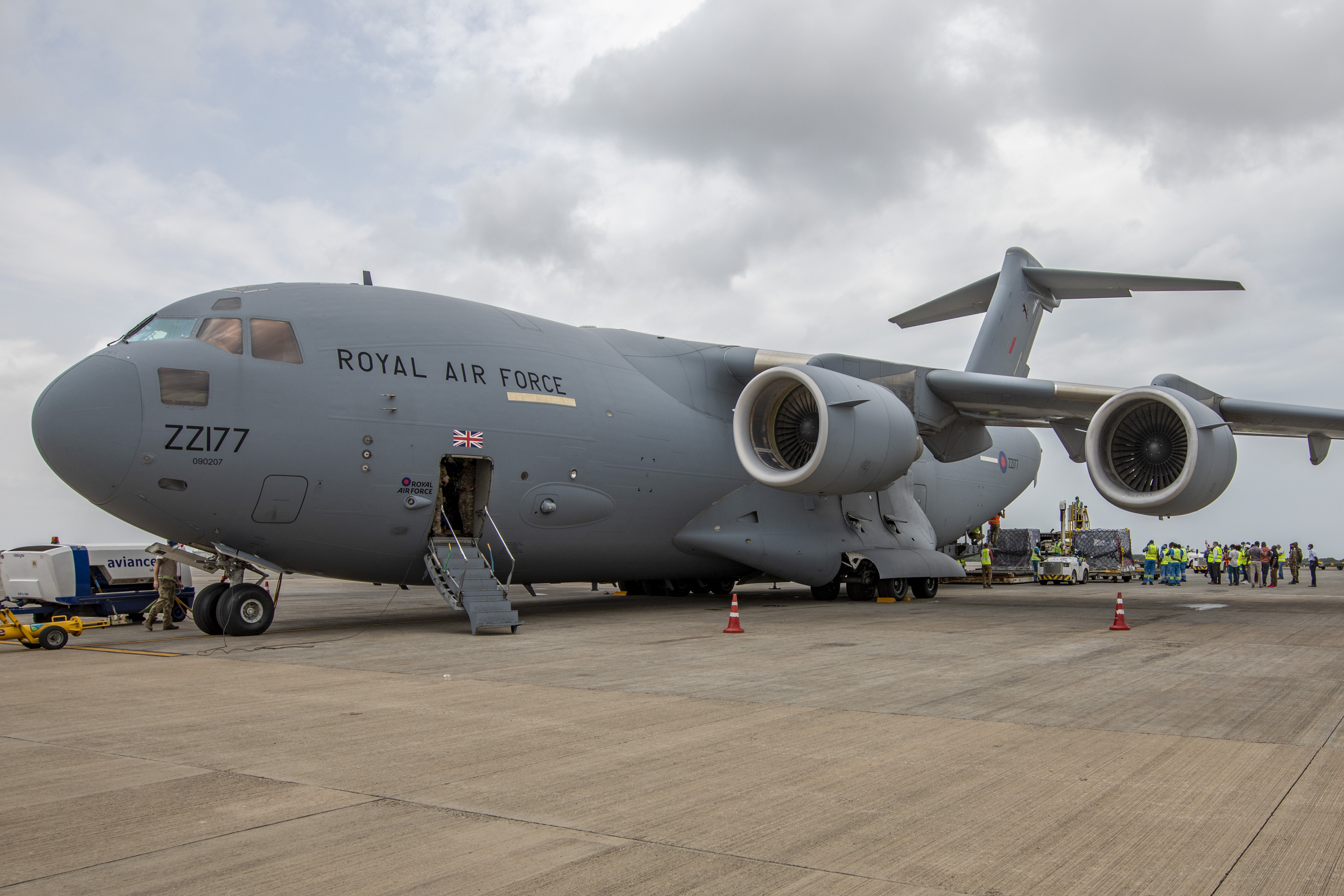
Royal Air Force flights delivering medical supplies for Ghana Medical Aid

On 11 March, President Nana Akufo-Addo directed the Minister of Finance, Ken Ofori-Atta, to make the cedi equivalent of $US100 million available to enhance Ghana's coronavirus

preparedness and response plan. The Ghana COVID-19 Private Sector Fund was also initiated by the Government of Ghana to aid in the fight against the pandemic. The president disclosed that the government, through the MoE, planned a relief package for private schools who were affected by COVID-19 induced shutdown of schools. The Finance Minister claimed in his report that the government spent about 54.3 million Ghana cedis to provide cooked and uncooked food to the vulnerable during the 3-week lockdown. The government stated that it would provide free electricity and water for the rest of 2020.

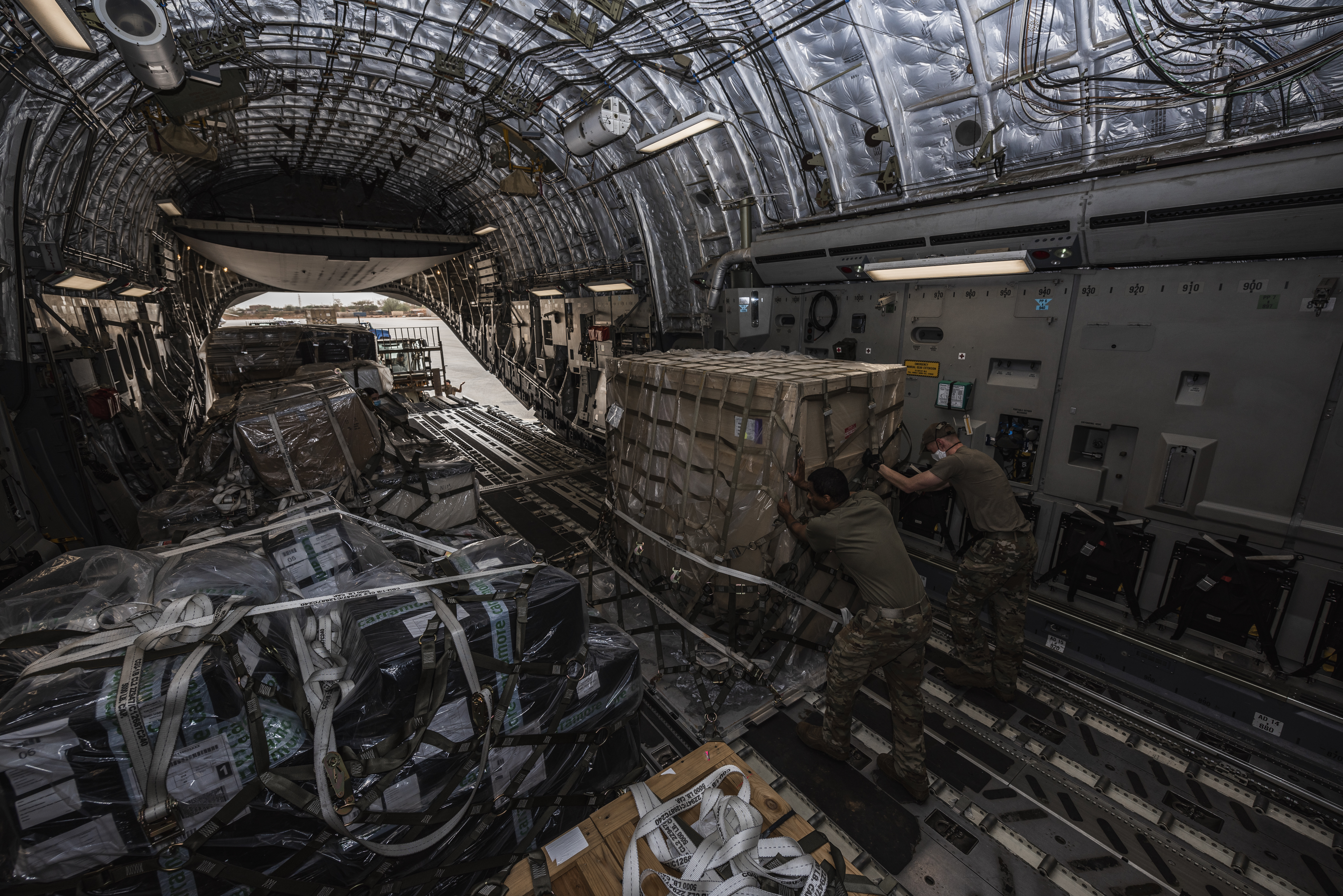
Air Forces Africa delivers medical supplies to Ghana

The Parliament of Ghana granted a tax waiver of GHS174 million cedis (equivalent to US$30 million) on income taxes of frontline workers. This spanned for three months from July to September 2020. The Minister of Employment and Labor Relations claimed government's intervention in easing of restrictions restored over 2,849 out of the over 11,000 job losses due to the pandemic. Government established a committee to bring about modalities to implement the National Unemployment Insurance Scheme to help those who lost their jobs during the pandemic.

Government supported entrepreneurs with disability in the Northern, North East and Savannah regions with an amount of GH¢200,000 to help them in their businesses due to the impact of COVID-19. Government released packages to partners in the Tourism industry and other businesses to help them against the pandemic.

=== Medical response ===
The government begun the construction of various treatment centres across the country to help in the National COVID-19 Treatment. This includes the Ghana Infectious Disease Centre There was also the expansion of COVID-19 treatment centres across Ghana in order to make available more logistics and beds for COVID-19 management.

Ghana begun the local production of nose masks as well as Medical gowns, head covers, and medical scrubs. One million face masks are produced a day. The government claimed that about 18.8million face masks have been manufactured by the country. Government has set aside 80million Ghana cedis to pay frontline health workers' incentive package as part of Ghana's COVID-19 pandemic preparedness. The GHS received a vehicle and sets of PPEs from UK to help in the elimination of diseases in the country. The National Ambulance Service underwent some training amid COVID-19.

China provided Ghana with a medical team to stop the spread of the virus in the country.

=== Testing ===
In early March, the NMIMR was the only facility capable of testing for COVID-19 in Ghana. Moreover, it had a very limited supply of test kits. Ghana therefore adopted pool testing as a means for COVID-19 testing. During testing, individual specimens are combined into pools. When a pool tests positive, then each individual specimen of that particular pool is tested. Initially, the NMIMR tested a pool size of fives, which was later increased to ten.

In October, the president stated that across Ghana, the government has expanded COVID-19 testing facilities from the initial two to 16, which include those of private sector providers. Additionally some hospitals across the country have been equipped with the capacity to test for COVID-19.

On 30 July, the GHS claimed it was expanding COVID-19 testings to hospitals across Ghana. The government distributed 50,000 PCR testing kits and other kits to COVID-19 testing facilities across Ghana. laboratory equipment and supplies were delivered by the government, improving the testing capacity of the nation.

=== Technology and Innovations ===
Government relaunched the GH COVID-19 tracker app after it was launched on 13 April. The use of Veronica buckets have become very popular in Ghana following the outbreak of the novel coronavirus as it is used for hand washing to stem the spread of the virus.

The SolaWash, an automated and mobile hand washing machine powered by solar panels was invented by Richard Kwarteng and his team in Kumasi to fight against the COVID-19 pandemic.

Ghana became the first country to use drone aircraft in the fight against the pandemic through the transport of COVID-19 test samples. From May 2020, Zipline delivered 2,573 COVID-19 samples to the NMIMR and the KCCR. On 15 October, the MoH received a COVID-19 AI software for detecting the virus on Chest X-rays. On 19 October, a digital-based health system introduced a new form of testing COVID-19 for passengers and others in the country. Both travellers and the general public can be tested from the comfort of their homes or any place of their choice.

The Municipal Director of Education of Prestea claimed ICT changed how education is carried out around the world especially in the era of the pandemic.

An authority outdoor ways to promote the use of ICT as a mode of teaching and learning for schools in Ghana. An institute appealed to the government to invest in IT infrastructure to help in online studies.

Students of Obuasi Sec/Tech created a 'touchless bin' in the fight against the virus.

STU adopted virtual learning tools to curb the spread of the virus.

A digital healthcare provider launched a 'Drive Through Services' to help in acquiring PCR test for the virus.

Teachers were taught by a Tech company to construct a mechanism to curb the spread of the virus.

An app would be used in the deployment of the COVID-19 vaccine in the country. A vaccination app would be adopted to book an appointment before going to the vaccination centre.

The church was claimed to have shifted to technology for sermons and revenue collection due to the pandemic.

On 23 March, a tracker for COVID-19 response funds was launched by BudgIT Ghana and Connected Development (CODE), in collaboration with SEND Ghana, a Civil Society Organisation (CSO) to monitor how government uses monies received.

3 KNUST students built a solar-powered automatic handwashing station.

Hologram and QR code feature was said to be embedded on the COVID-19 user card to authenticate vaccination status.

=== Agriculture ===
According to the UER Director of the Department of Agriculture, COVID-19 affected the food production in 2020 farming season.

National Food Buffer Stock Company claimed food was available to feed students and the impacts of COVID-19 in schools in 2020.

COVID-19 relief items were donated to more than 700 farmers in the Western region.

An NGO urged the government to develop the local seed system in the era of the pandemic.

A report by UNICEF and the WFP claimed the pandemic brought about nutrition crisis.

The pandemic with another factor was claimed to force farmers to go into charcoal production.

MoFA with support from WFP to share $1.5 million to about 5,000 farmers due to the impact of the pandemic.

GSS in partnership with UNDP and GIZ conducted an Agribusiness Tracker Survey to track the impact of the pandemic on Agribusiness in the country.

=== Media ===
Foreign media reportage on the President's address to the nation focused on a number of vital areas.

Zoomlion claimed it would embark on a disinfection exercise in all media houses.

The media was commended by the government for the coverage of Rawlings' funeral to avoid crowd at the funeral grounds. A news station was commended by the COVID-19 ICU Team leader for educating the public. The media was advised to support the campaign to make the public take the COVID-19 vaccine. Some workers in the Media received the COVID-19 vaccine.

The number of media staff and journalists were to be reduced in the parliament to observe the safety protocols.

A journalist from GHOne TV won the ICFJ Global Contest on the reporting of COVID-19.

The media especially the radio was commended for educating the public on COVID-19.

=== Entertainment ===
A musician revealed he would temporarily close his business venture because of the pandemic.

A rapper claimed COVID-19 exposed the country's creative arts sector as an unplanned industry.

Mr. Drew, a Ghanaian musician claimed artistes' economic conditions were bad due to the pandemic.

MUSIGA launched a campaign to halt the spread of the virus. MUSIGA featured Celestine Donkor, Kofi Kinaata, Amandzeba, Pat Thomas and other musicians to release a song to educate on COVID-19 and how to fight against it.

=== Tourism ===
The GTA announced some measures the industry could take to curb the spread of the virus. The GTA also revealed it would enforce the observance of the safety protocols in tourist sites and other facilities. The GTA claimed there was a reduction of tourism in the country in 2020 due to the pandemic, due to the travel restrictions The GTA claimed it would help the country's tourism despite the impacts by the pandemic.

The GTA partnered with others to donate PPEs and other items to GMA. The GTA donated items to Kumasi South Hospital to halt the spread of the virus.

An association assured the GTA its members would observe the COVID-19 protocols.

Hotels in Sekondi-Takoradi were claimed to have complied with the President's laid down rules. The President of Ghana Hotels Association claimed some hotels were 'struggling and suffering' due to the impact of the virus.

Health workers in Bolgatanga Regional Hospital were advised by the GTA in the Upper East region to strengthen fight against the virus.

== Reopening process ==
On 19 April 2020, it was announced by the President of Ghana in his address to the nation that the partial lockdown that had been imposed three weeks earlier was lifted but the other preventive protocols were still in effect. On 11 May 2020, the government of Ghana through the office of the Ghana Tourism Authority, gave hotels, bars and restaurants permission to reopen but to operate under enhanced social distancing procedures.

Stage one of the process of easing restrictions took effect on 5 June 2020. Religious services, funerals, and weddings were allowed with reduced capacity and length.

On 20 August, a 10-member committee was inaugurated by the Minister of Education to advise and deliberate on re-opening of schools. By June, schools where partially reopened as only BECE and WASSCE candidates were permitted to remain in school under social distancing protocols. Eighteen thousand Veronica Buckets, 800,000 pieces of 200-millilitre sanitizers, 36,000 rolls of tissue paper, 36,000 gallons of liquid soap and 7,200 thermometer guns have also been distributed to schools, according to the President. The president Nana Akufo-Addo in his address to the nation announced that all nursery, kindergarten, primary, JHS 1, SHS 1 students have had the rest of their academic year postponed until January 2021.

On 1 September, the air borders of the nation were reopened. On 31 August, the MoH claimed Ghana has put in place enough measures to detect possible COVID-19 cases at KIA. According to the director of the GHS, children under the five years, air crew and passengers on transit would not undergo testing for COVID-19 at the KIA. Travelers arriving to Ghana by air were expected to pay US$150 for COVID-19 test as part of measures to control the spread of the virus in Ghana.

On 20 September, the Ghanaian president lifted the ban on football as he announced the Ghana Premier League and Division One Football league shall resume in October, 2020. Seat capacity in stadiums were reduced with the Accra Sports Stadium for instance accommodating 9,500 supporters for the 2020–21 Ghana Premier League. However, beaches, cinemas nightclubs and pubs were still closed due to COVID-19. The Ghana Women's Premier League was set to begin in January 2021 after the government placed a ban on all football related activities in March 2020 due to COVID-19. Following the lifting of the ban on football Government with the GFA begun the COVID-19 testing of players and club members of Ghana Premier league clubs on 22 October.

On 15 January, the President announced the reopening of schools at all levels in his 21st address to the nation.

== United Nations reports ==
- On 1 September, the UN office in Ghana released a booklet on messages covering COVID-19 preventive and impact measures.
- On 24 September, the UN Global Conduct, UNDP and the ICC collaborated with other partners in the sharing of vital information to local environments with the objective of recovering better from COVID-19 pandemic.
- On 28 September, Ghana with other 4 countries were selected to receive financial benefit from the COVID-19 Private Sector Global Facility established by the UNDP, UN Global Compact and ICC.
- On 7 October, the UN supported Ghana with some funds to aid the country's recovery from COVID-19 pandemic.
- On 19 November, the UN Deputy Secretary-General toured the UN COVID-19 field hospital in Accra.
- On 1 December, report from UNAIDS claimed COVID-19 might result in HIV infections and AIDS-related deaths.
- On 4 December, the UNICEF donated medical items claimed to be worth $40,000 to the GHS to fight against the pandemic.
- On 20 December, report from UNDP claimed the COVID-19 pandemic would not be the last crisis to affect the globe.
- On 23 December, the UNDP Ghana announced 22 winners of its COVID-19 Innovation Challenge.
- On 13 January, UNESCO cautioned education was likely to reduce by 12% due to the impact of COVID-19. UNICEF claimed the shutting of schools due to the pandemic would affect children.
- On 14 January, a report from UNOWAS claimed countries in West Africa and the Sahel region continued to face difficulties caused by the pandemic.
- On 18 January, the UN Peace Ambassador to the country urged the government to make the testing of COVID-19 free for all.
- On 20 January, the UNICEF lauded the government for its decision for schools to reopen.
- On 27 January, the UN Coordinator in the country said parents should provide their wards with nose masks.
- On 5 February, the UNICEF, Denmark and Ghana launched a COVID-19 response partnership.
- On 9 February, a registry with the support from WFP collected information of Ghanaians in some regions for relief items.
- On 26 February, UNICEF in partnership with the Government of China presented some equipment to GHS to support children during the pandemic.

== World Bank responses ==
- On 14 October, the board of executive directors of the World Bank gave an approval of $12 billion for 111 countries to finance the buying and distribution of COVID-19 vaccines and other items for their citizens.
- On 23 October, the World Bank claimed it would continue to help efforts of African governments to recover from the pandemic.
- On 11 November, the Ghana's World Bank Country Director claimed an amount of US$130 million was approved for the country to support those affected by COVID-19.
- On 3 December, the World Bank in a report claimed the closure of schools in relation to the pandemic would push about 72 million children into 'learning poverty'.
- On 26 December, the World Bank claimed COVID-19 had pushed millions into poverty including Sub-Saharan African countries.
- On 29 January, the World Bank prepared vaccine financing projects for some countries including Ghana.
- On 10 February, the World Bank claimed they were to secure funds for the procurement of COVID-19 vaccine, and it was estimated at $180 million.
- On 25 February, the World Bank in a report claimed the pandemic created new avenues for women.
- On 18 March, the World Bank advised the government to adopt a multi-stakeholder approach to transform the economy of the country.
- On 1 April, the World Bank approved US$100 million to assist the Government of Ghana due to the impact of the pandemic.

== Infections among health workers ==
On 20 May 2020, it was confirmed 30 health workers tested positive for the virus in Ashanti region during their line of duty. It was confirmed by the regional director of health services. Affected persons were front-line workers managing the disease in the region. 173 new cases were confirmed making Ghana's case move to 6,269 according to Ghana Health Service. 125 more recoveries were made, raising the number of recovered persons to 1,898.

On 18 June 2020, it was confirmed 97 health workers in the Ashanti region tested positive for the virus. It was made known by the regional director of health during a press briefing in Kumasi.

On 24 June 2020, the CEO of Korle-Bu tested positive for the virus. Three staff of his office also went for isolation. The Ghana Association of Medical Laboratory Scientists confirmed the death of one of its members who died from the virus. He worked at the Weija-Gbawe Municipal Hospital.

The Presidential Advisor on Health said health officials would not conduct mass testing exercise for coronavirus in Ghana because the approach is expensive and would not reduce the spread of the virus.

NMIMR said it conducted a COVID-19 testing audit and hoped to clear backlog of 7,000 samples yet to be tested.

The director general of the GHS said a team was to assess the circumstances for which front line health personnel were being affected with the virus.

The Health workers union claimed over 770 health workers contracted COVID-19 disease because of lack of PPEs. WHO announced independent evaluation of the world's response to COVID-19 pandemic.

NMIMR kept track of persons who were discharged under the new COVID-19 discharge protocols.

Private medical practitioners raised red flags over how the country is managing COVID-19 after its first outbreak.

About 2,065 health workers tested positive for COVID-19 in Ghana.

24 health workers tested positive for COVID-19 in the Ahafo region. This was disclosed by the regional director at an interview.

One nursing training school in the Western region recorded COVID-19 cases.

Six staff of the Northern Regional Health Directorate contracted the virus. Also, 22 staff were infected by the virus. 32 health workers also contracted the virus at the TTH.

About 254 staff of KATH were reported to have tested positive of the virus since its outbreak in Ghana.

Nine out of 95 nurses who went to Barbados for two years to work tested positive for the virus.

231 Health workers in the Bono region recovered from COVID-19 after they tested positive for the virus.

NMIMR tested the efficacy of COVID-19 PCR Detection Kit that is claimed to be used for testing entrants when the airport reopens.

7 out of the 12 nurses who arrived from Barbados on 30 July after testing positive for the virus recovered.

A member of the COVID-19 burial team and his spouse tested positive for COVID-19.

3,580 health workers were claimed by the GHS to have contracted COVID-19.

15 health workers tested positive for the virus, and a nurse in the Upper East region died of the virus. A nurse also recovered from the virus and donated some items to newborns.

About 840 nurses were claimed to have contracted COVID-19 in the country. The Registered Nurses and Midwives Association in Ghana claimed four of its members died from COVID-19. They appealed for the testing of their staff for the virus. They also disclosed majority of health centres do not observe the protocols. 789 health workers were claimed to have tested positive for the virus in two months.

Dr Okoe-Boye claimed health workers would be among the initial group to take the COVID-19 vaccine.

Six mortuary workers were claimed to have died from the virus between December 2020 and January 2021.

The Registered Nurses and Midwives Association in Ghana revealed 20 of its staff tested positive for the virus in Ashanti region. About 36 nurses at KATH tested positive for the virus. The association also claimed 50 staff contracted COVID-19 in the Volta region.

About 214 health workers were claimed to have tested positive for the virus in the Northern region. About 327 health workers tested positive for the virus in Bono East region. About 60 health workers contracted COVID-19 in Savelugu Hospital, the facility was closed. Two health workers died of the virus in Upper East region.

According to the GMA, more than 450 dentists and doctors contracted the virus and 7 passed.

10 doctors at UGMC tested positive for the virus.

710 health workers tested positive for the virus in Greater Accra region with four deaths.

== Notable COVID-19 Deaths ==
The following notable people died of COVID-19:

- Jacob Plange-Rhule
- Kwadwo Owusu Afriyie
- Anthony Kobina Kurentsir Sam, Municipal Chief Executive of Sekondi/Takoradi MA
- Joshua Kyeremeh
- Alhaji Mustapha Oti Boateng, the CEO OF Chocho Industries.
- Nanabanyin Pratt, the brother of Kwesi Pratt.
- Leonard Gikunu, the Head of Corporate Finance at Fidelity Bank.
- Frances Awua-Kyeremanten, Senior Female Staff of Ashesi University.
- Philip Odei Asare, MD of Best Point Savings and Loans.
- Amoako Tuffour, politician.
- Georgette Ami Dede Djaba, politician.
- Samuel Mensah, a rapper and CEO of Uncle John's Bakery.
- Kwasi Sainti Baffoe-Bonnie, CEO of Radio Gold.
- Samuel Akpatsu, Senior Broker Officer of KEK Reinsurance Brokers Limited.
- Bhagwan Ramchand Khubchandani, Owner of Melcom Group Of Companies.
- Naa Adoley Ankrah, Head of HR at Prudential Bank.
- Professor George Asumeng Koffuor, a Pharmacologist.
- Josephine Baiden Agyarko, widow of Emmanuel Agyarko
- Fred Afortey Armah, Police Inspector at Bono Regional Crime Investigative Department.
- Michael Vierra, Chief Superintendent of GPS.
- Joshua Mahamadu Hamidu, former chief of Defence Staff
- Peter Matlare, deputy chief executive officer of Absa Group Limited and chief executive responsible for Absa regional operations,

== Ghana's rank in Africa and World ==
In June 2020, Ghana was ranked as the country with the fourth-highest number of COVID-19 cases in Africa with 12,929 cases.

Ghana was ranked as the 'best' responsive country in Africa on COVID-19 prevention measures and other factors in a report by Yicai Media Group.

In October 2020, in a survey, about 3% of Ghanaian participants were scared their companies would not survive the COVID-19 crisis.

In October 2020, the Finance Minister claimed Ghana was among the 'best' 3 countries in the world to have managed the crisis during the pandemic.

In January 2021, Ghana was ranked as the 41st 'best' in the world in COVID-19 response by an Australian think tank.

Ghana and South Korea were claimed to be the countries that got it 'right' concerning the ways of handling the virus.

More than 23 travel and tour agencies closed down in Kumasi due to the impact of the pandemic.

== COVID-19 and jobs ==
- Ghana Trades Union Congress (TUC), revealed an estimated 100,000 job losses in the formal sector and 400,000 in the informal sector after a market research. All these jobs were lost in less than 6 months after the first COVID-19 case in March, 2020.
- The Minister of Employment and Labor Relations claimed the jobs of about 11.2 million people in Ghana were affected due to the COVID-19 pandemic.
- According to reports from GSS, about 48,998 businesses in Ghana closed down during the 3-month lockdown due to COVID-19. According to a survey from GSS in partnership with World Bank and UNDP, about 42,000 employees were laid off and 770,000 workers had reduction in their wages during the partial lockdown.
- About 500 workers lost their jobs due to the cancellation of oil and gas contracts caused by the outbreak of COVID-19.
- According to the Chief Labor Officer at the Ministry of Employment and Labor Relations, more than 7,000 workers lost their jobs from April to June in the public sector.
- According to the CEO of Ghana Employers Association, businesses would boost employment in Ghana if the virus stood under control.
- Some businesses in the hospitality industry were concerned about the new COVID-19 infections because it might bring job losses.
- A Project Coordinator under ILO warned against the decrease of employees due to the impact of the pandemic.
- There was no loss of jobs among public sector workers due to the impact of the pandemic.
- According to a report, lockdown in the country affected the workers hard.
- More than 300 employees of Aviation Handling Service Ghana were sent home due to the impact of the pandemic.
- According to a survey, about 50% of Ghanaians lost their source of income due to the pandemic.

== See also ==
- COVID-19 pandemic in Africa
- COVID-19 pandemic by country and territory
- Communities on Edge - COVID crisis (community responses)
- COVID-19 vaccination in Ghana
