= Impact of the COVID-19 pandemic on education in Ghana =

Most governments decided to temporarily close educational institutions in an attempt to reduce the spread of COVID-19. As of 12 January 2021, approximately 825 million learners are affected due to school closures in response to the pandemic. According to UNICEF monitoring, 23 countries are implementing nationwide closures and 40 are implementing local closures, impacting about 47 percent of the world's student population. 112 countries' schools are open.

On 23 March 2020, Cambridge International Examinations (CIE) released a statement announcing the cancellation of Cambridge IGCSE, Cambridge O Level, Cambridge International AS & A Level, Cambridge AICE Diploma, and Cambridge Pre-U examinations for the May/June 2020 series across all countries. International Baccalaureate exams have also been cancelled. In addition, Advanced Placement Exams, SAT administrations, and ACT administrations have been moved online and cancelled.

School closures impact not only students, teachers, and families. but have far-reaching economic and societal consequences. School closures in response to the pandemic have shed light on various social and economic issues, including student debt, digital learning, food insecurity, and homelessness, as well as access to childcare, health care, housing, internet, and disability services. The impact was more severe for disadvantaged children and their families, causing interrupted learning, compromised nutrition, childcare problems, and consequent economic cost to families who could not work.

In response to school closures, UNESCO recommended the use of distance learning programs and open educational applications and platforms that schools and teachers can use to reach learners remotely and limit the disruption of education. Colleges have scrambled to find creative solutions to teaching students online, in-person but socially distant, or in a hybrid format.

== Timeline ==
Basic schools, senior high schools and universities, both public and private, have also been closed. Only BECE and WASSCE candidates were permitted to remain in school under social distancing protocols.

The GES and Zoomlion Ghana Limited also joined forces to launch an initiative to fumigate all senior high, special and technical schools in the country to curb the spread of the pandemic.

Accra Technical University confirmed a COVID-19 case after symptoms were shown.

The president, in his address to the nation, assured parents of students to be calm over the reopening of schools amidst the increasing number of coronavirus cases in Ghana.

Students of Accra Girls School were to undergo mass testing for COVID-19 disease after it was reported some students tested positive for the virus.

The GES maintained that final year SHS students would write their WASSCE exams despite COVID-19 fears.

The COVID-19 team of the NDC proposed mass testing of students and the closure of schools as cases were recorded and continued to rise.

The minister for education, who recovered from the virus, led a campaign against the stigmatization of people infected with COVID-19.

The president asked students and teachers to abide by the COVID-19 protocols, who would be involved in the conduct of the 2020 final year exams.

GES and GHS issued a joint statement stating, "any school where no positive case of COVID-19 has been recorded, the students can vacate and go home."

The VC of UG revealed the mode of teaching and learning to curb the spread of COVID-19.

An organization appealed to the government to provide PPE to schools during their reopening.

The executive director of an education think-tank claimed the government should provide COVID-19 safety materials before school reopened.

An organization asked the government to take into consideration the reopening of schools in January 2021. The organization hailed the government for its decision to reopen schools. The president claimed it was safe for schools to resume for academic activities and he mentioned the dates of amdist COVID-19 resumption.

The MoE released a document of the approved calendar from KG to SHS to curb the spread of the virus.

The director-general of GES rthat evealed JHS students would run a semester system with the observance of the protocols. He also cautioned schools not to charge or ask for COVID-19 tests before students are admitted. UG adopted the double track system to help reduce the spread of the virus among staff, students and lecturers. Students in the university resisted the double track system. The university partnered with Zoomlion to disinfect the institution. A student advised the university to enforce the COVID-19 protocols. The university claimed it would punish students who failed to observe the safety protocols.

MoE revealed that private schools would be provided with PPE and would be fumigated for free. MoE told school authorities to contact their local assemblies for PPE. It appealed with parents to support the government to provide PPE to every school.

Students arrived at the various universities as directed by the president for the reopening of schools.

Some Accra students were 'excited' that schools reopened. An association claimed that about 651,000 children were expected back to school. School children returned to schools while observing the safety protocols.

The GES claimed it would ensure schools are safe for teaching and learning, it issued some guidelines to be followed, it also urged parents to protect their children from the virus, it also claimed all schools were presented with PPE. The institution was urged to enforce the protocols in schools for assurance to parents. The institution claimed it trained 52,000 teachers to assist in halting the spread of the virus in schools. The GES with the support from the government decided to provide laptops to teachers for use during the COVID-19 era. The institution claimed it would increase surveillance and intensify contact tracing in schools in Ghana.

NUGS appealed to the parliament to consider the motion for free tertiary education due to the impact of the pandemic. The Speaker of Parliament urged the leadership of the political parties to aid streamline the motion for free tertiary. An MP claimed stopping students from payment of fees in tertiary institutions would be a minimal cost to the country. Parliament voted against free tertiary education for students. The VC of Pentecost University supported calls for absorption of fees for tertiary students.

The administration of UPSA claimed it would mix online and physical teaching and learning for the 2020/21 academic year due to the pandemic.

A clinical microbiologist, Dr Michael Owusu, claimed the government might be forced to shut down schools.

A conference of directors appealed to the GES to take action on PPE in institutions.

An authority warned school authorities to enforce the safety protocols.

The president of an association blamed parents for the challenges they faced in curbing the spread of the virus in schools.

Five students of Koforidua Technical were claimed to have tested positive for COVID-19. It was reported that a student of TTU tested positive for the virus. About 142 cases of COVID-19 were confirmed in some schools in four regions. A girls' school in the Eastern region confirmed 13 COVID-19 cases. UENR confirmed five cases of COVID-19 in Sunyani.

The chairman of Vice-Chancellors Ghana claimed that cases recorded in some universities in the country were managed.

The National Schools Inspectorate Authority called on schools to report COVID-19 cases to the GHS.

The Union of Teachers was against calls for the closure of schools due to the increase in infections. A virologist at KCCR appealed to the government to shut down lower primary and others. Child Right International supported the union of teachers against calls for closure of schools.

The board chairman of a school claimed that private schools were affected by the pandemic.

The COVID-19 pandemic was claimed to have provided the opportunity to strengthen online studies.

Private schools in the country claimed they were still in hardship due to the pandemic.
