= Dzigbordi Kwaku-Dosoo =

Ghanaian entrepreneur

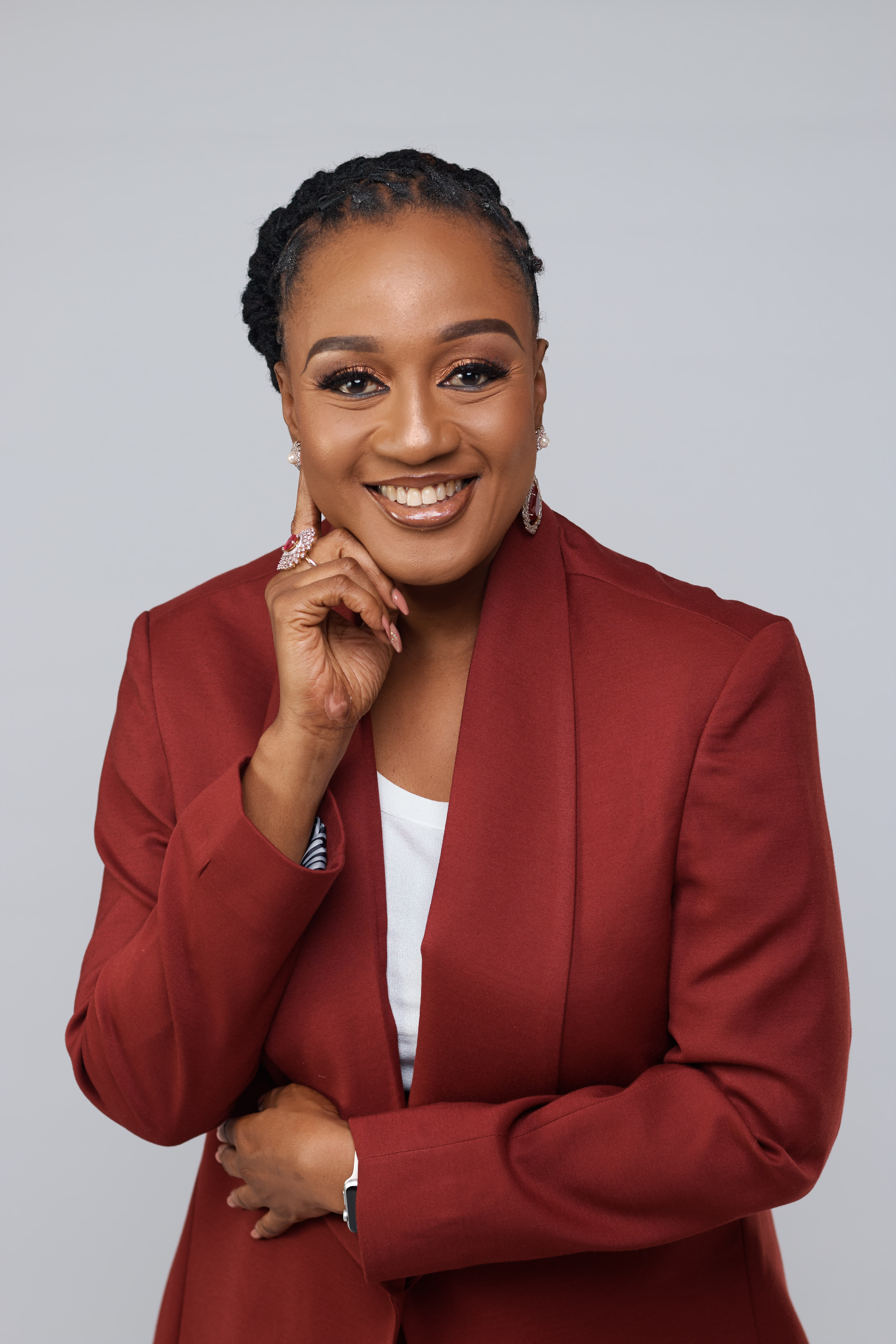
- Born: Ghana
- Occupations: Businesswoman, Consultant, Speaker
- Known for: Allure Africa
- Notable work: The Dzibordi Show
- Relatives: Ken Kwaku

Dzigbordi Kwaku-Dosoo is a Ghanaian entrepreneur, speaker, media personality, and consultant. She is the founder and CEO of DCG Consulting Group and Allure Africa.

== Early life and education ==
Dzigbordi was born in Accra, to the late Mr. Tennyson Emmanuel Kwaku and the late Mrs. Vivian Americana Mould. She had her secondary education at the Accra Girls Senior High School, in the Greater Accra Region.

She continued at Virginia State University, where she obtained a bachelor's degree in finance and accounting and an executive education at Harvard University.

She is currently a certified high-performance coach (CHPC), an international etiquette protocol consultant, and Management Consultant.

== Career ==
She was recruited right out of university into a retail bank in New York, worked in traditional retail and business banking, and learned about investment banking.

She returned to Ghana and became the Head of Trade and Research Unit at Strategic African Securities, Ghana.

She established a financial service consultancy called "Business Linkages International," which included consulting with the World Bank Group’s Multilateral Investment Guarantee Agency (MIGA), the International Finance Corporation (IFC), and USAID. The company transitioned into the Eagle Group in 2004.

In 1998, after a ten-year career in finance, Dzigbordi founded a spa business in Ghana called Allure Saloon, which then became Allure Africa.

She once owned an aromatherapy and body-care brand called Kanshi which was featured in Women's Wear Daily in 2010 before entering the United States market in 2014.

She formerly owned a talk show called The Dzigbordi Show, which aired in 46 countries in Africa, the UK and Europe.

== Volunteering ==
Dzigbordi is a member of the Executive Women Network and doubles as a trustee of the Children’s Heart Foundation Ghana, a charity that raises funding for children with congenital heart diseases.

== Personal life ==
Dzigbordi was married to the late Lionel Van Lare Dosoo, a former Deputy Governor of the Bank of Ghana. She is the mother of one child.

== List of awards and nominations ==
Year	Award	Result	Reference
2022	Female Most Exceptional Change-Maker – Humanitarian Awards Global	Nominated	
2022	50 African Event Influencers in Africa - ICS Africa	Honorary	
2019	Women's Choice Awards Africa, "The Boss Lady of the Year"	Nomination	
2017	Inspiration Award – Heart of Beauty and Innovation", and "Repêchage President's Award"	Won	
2009	Marketing Woman of the Year" by the Chartered Institute of Marketing, Ghana (CIMG)	Won	
