= Basic Education Certificate Examination =

National entrance examination

The Basic Education Certificate Examination (BECE) is the main examination to qualify students for admission into secondary and vocational schools in Ghana, and Nigeria. It is written after three years of junior secondary education. It is administered by the Ghana Education Service under the Ministry of Education. In Nigeria, it is administered by the state ministry of education in each state under the supervision of the National Examinations Council (NECO). NECO directly organizes examinations for Unity Schools, Armed Forces Secondary Schools, and other Federal Government schools. Candidates in the third year of junior high schools approved by the Ghana Education Service are eligible for the examination. It is conducted annually in June (Ghana) and May or June (Nigeria).

== Tested subjects (Ghana) ==
- English Language
- Mathematics
- Integrated Science
- Social Studies
- Religious and Moral Education
- French

(Optional)

- Ghanaian language (any Ghanaian language offered at candidate's school)
- Career Technology
- Computing
- Creative Arts and Design
- Arabic (Optional)

== Tested subjects (Nigeria) ==
- English Language
- Mathematics
- National Values Education (Including Civic Education, Social Studies and Christian/Islamic Religious Studies)
- Basic Science and Technology
- Cultural and Creative Arts
- Pre-vocational Studies
- Foreign Language (French or Arabic)
- Nigerian Language (Edo, Efik, Hausa, Igbo or Yoruba)
- Business Studies
- History (starting 2021)

== Registration ==
Schools approved by the Ghana Education Service, or NECO are eligible to register students for the BECE each year. The six-week entry period begins in October and ends in November. Participating schools upload their Statement of Entries and School Choice Files via the Internet for processing. Continuous Assessment Scores are submitted to the council on compact discs.

== Candidate grading and selection ==
The examination consists of multiple-choice and written questions, and Continuous (Internal) Assessment marks provided by the schools. In Ghana, candidates are graded on a nine-point scale, with Grade 1 for highest performance and Grade 9 for lowest.

From 2017–Date, Candidates in Nigeria have been graded on a non-linear 5 point scale from

- A(Distinction) The highest grade
- B(Upper Credit)
- C(Lower Credit)
- P(Pass)
- F(Fail) The lowest grade.

Before 2017, it was graded on a non-linear 4 point scale:

- A(Distinction) The highest grade
- C(Credit)
- P(Pass)
- F(Fail)

== Review of scripts ==
Scripts (graded tests) are kept for three months, then destroyed. During this time, they may be examined, for a fee, though by the authorization of a school's head or its accredited representative.

== Certification ==
Certificates for successful candidates are produced within a month after results are released, and are sent to schools for collection by individual candidates. Certificates lost or damaged after collection are not replaced.

== 2015 Cancellation ==
The 2015 BECE began Monday, June 15, with the English Language and Religious and Moral Education papers, and was scheduled to end Friday, June 19, with the Information Communication Technology (ICT) paper. On Wednesday, June 17, two days into the examinations, the West Africa Examinations Council cancelled five subjects, claiming the papers had been 'compromised' and that cancellation was necessary to safeguard both the integrity of the examinations and subsequent certificates. In its official statement, WAEC explained that leakage of the test was so widespread, some questions had been shared on the WhatsApp messaging platform.

The following papers were cancelled:

- English language 2
- Religious and Moral Education 2
- Integrated Science 2
- Mathematics 2
- Social Studies 2

The cancelled papers were re-administered on June 29 and June 30, 2015.
