= Noguchi Memorial Institute for Medical Research =

Medical research institute in Ghana

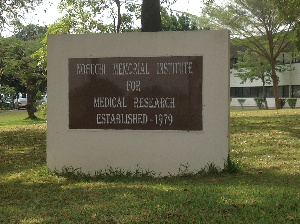
- A signpost for NMIMR
- Established: 1979
- Director: Dorothy Yeboah-Manu
- Location: University of Ghana, Legon, Ghana
- Coordinates: 5.634208°N 0.183332°W
- Interactive map of Noguchi Memorial Institute for Medical Research
- Website: www.noguchimedres.org

Noguchi Memorial Institute for Medical Research (NMIMR) is a medical research institute located at the University of Ghana in Accra, Ghana. It was founded in 1979 with funds donated by the Japanese government.

== History ==
The Noguchi Memorial Institute for Medical Research is a semi-autonomous institute of the University of Ghana located in the Ghanaian capital, Accra. It is the premiere biomedical research center in the country.

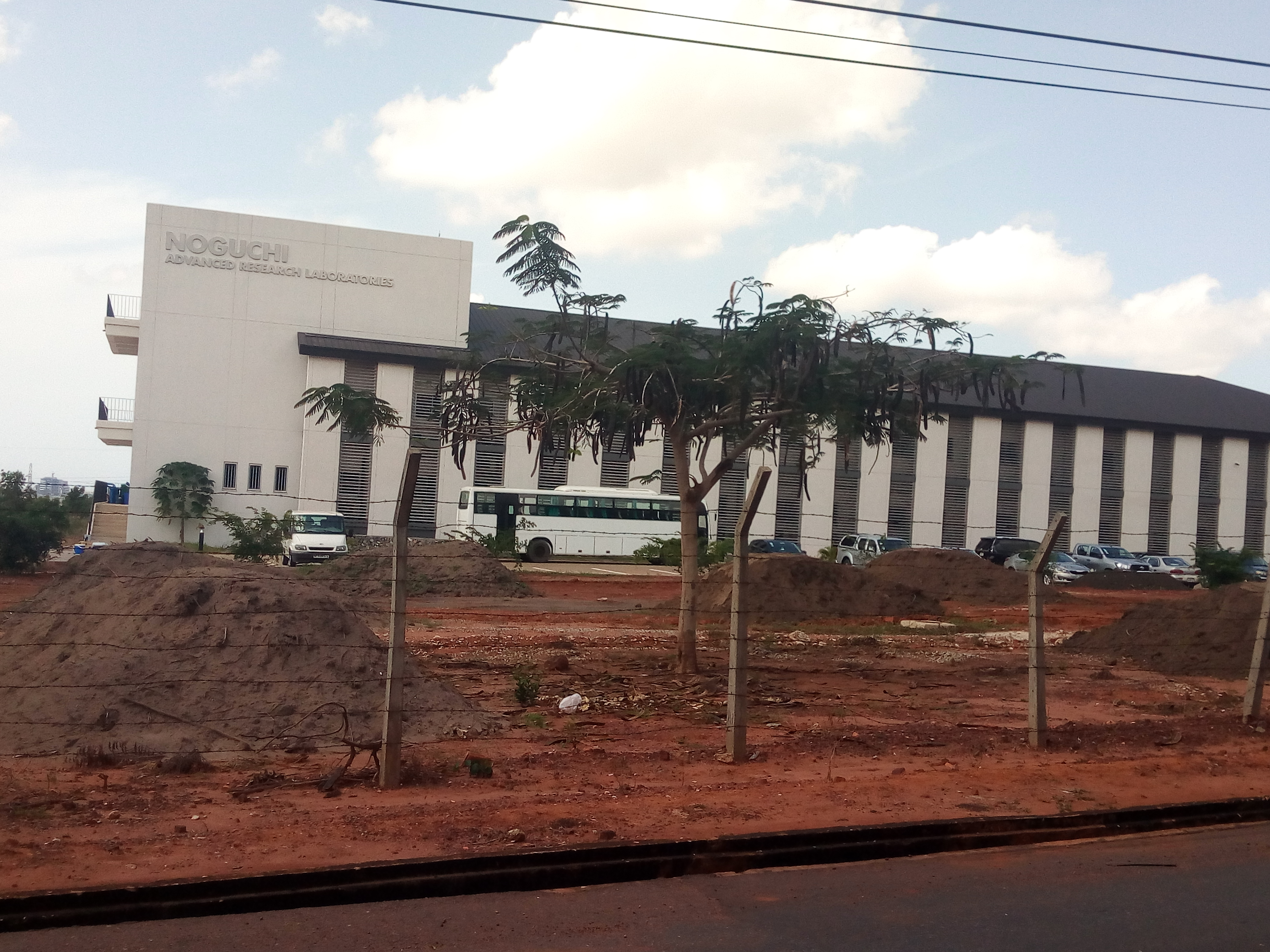
The entrance of NMIMR

The institute was established through combined efforts by the former dean of the University of Ghana school of medicine, Prof. E. O. Easmon, and Prof. Kenji Honda of Fukushima school of medicine in Japan, and therefore the Japan International Cooperation Agency (JICA). It was built by the government of Japan and donated to the government and people of Ghana in honour of the Japanese researcher Hideyo Noguchi, who researched Yellow fever in Ghana and died from the disease in the country in 1928. Test samples for the COVID-19 pandemic in Ghana are performed and confirmed by the institute.

== Training ==
In January 2021, the Institute undertook a five-week capacity building training in diseases for about 15 lab technicians who were from 9 countries in West Africa.

== Awards and recognition ==
In November 2020, the institute was given a citation by the Association of Ghana Industries at the ninth edition of the Ghana Industry and Quality Awards. This was in recognition of their efforts in combating the COVID-19 pandemic in Ghana.

In February 2021, the institute was given LIS, which was supported by Healthcare Federation of Ghana in partnership with Medlab Ghana Services Limited and other institutions. The LIS was said to be used by the institute's technical staff.
