= Josephine Oppong-Yeboah =

Ghanaian TV personality

Josephine Oppong Yeboah
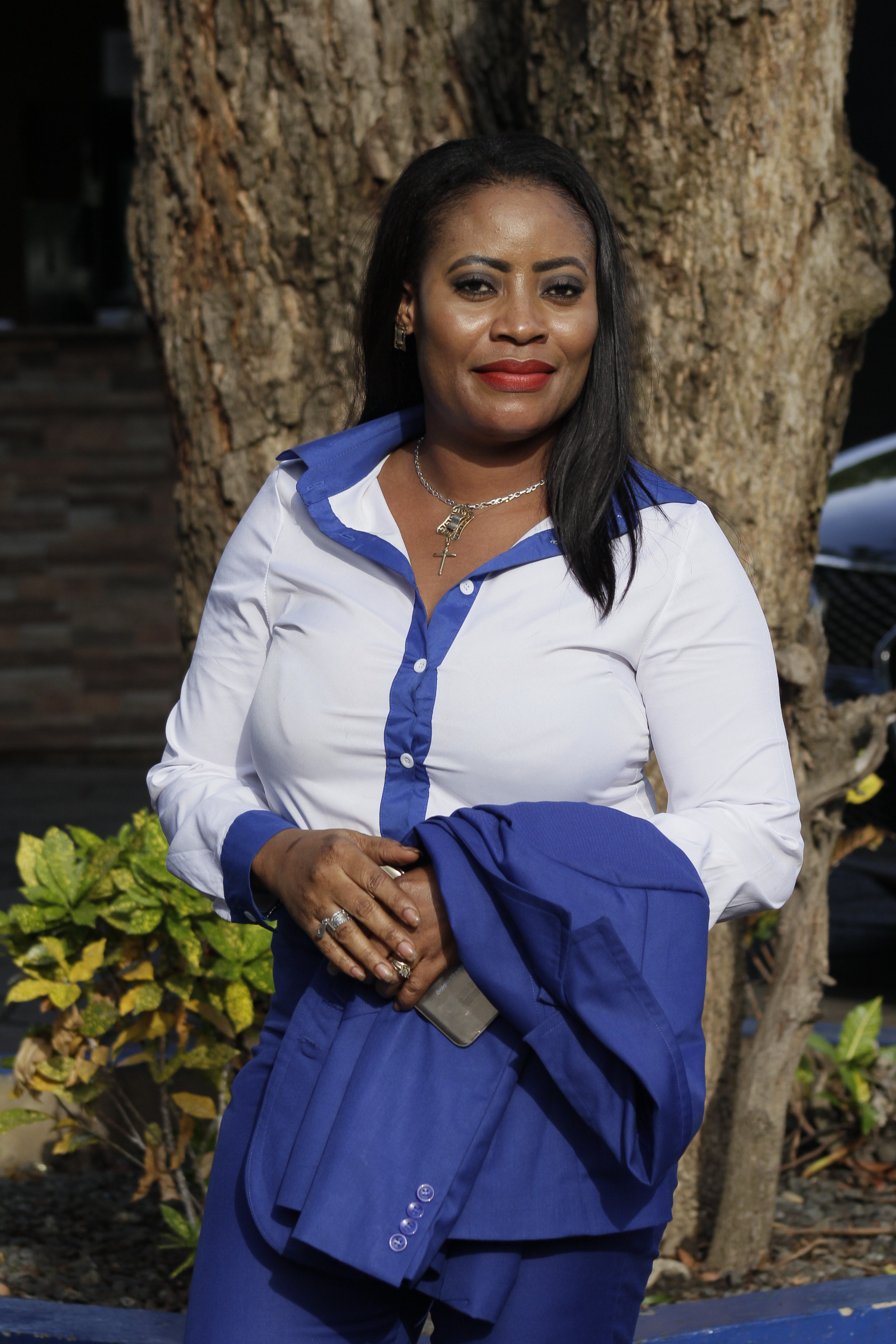
- Born: 19 June 1979 (age 46)
- Occupations: News anchor, broadcaster, media personality
- Years active: 2000-present
- Employer: Metro TV

Josephine Oppong-Yeboah (born 19 June 1979) popularly known as Lady Joy is a Ghanaian broadcast journalist, news anchor and gender advocate. She serves as a senior news anchor, producer, senior reporter and Regional Editor/Coordinator at Metro TV Ghana. She is a member of the Ghana Journalists Association (GJA) and also works an international correspondent.

== Early life and education ==
Oppong-Yeboah received her secondary school education at the Accra Girls Senior High School. She further obtained a Bachelor of Arts degree in Information Studies and Political Science from the University of Ghana. She also earned a Diploma in Journalism from the Ghana Institute of Journalism (GIJ).

== Career ==
Oppong-Yeboah was the country manager for Africa Watch Magazine. She was the senior news anchor and producer at E.TV Ghana and Sky 96.7 FM, as well as a Brong Ahafo regional correspondent for Joy FM. She was also the programme's manager and host at Top FM (formerly Top Radio), and the executive producer of Metro TV's Good Morning Ghana programme.

== Personal life ==
Oppong-Yeboah is a mother.

== Award ==
In 2019, Oppong-Yeboah won the Female Media Personality Award for her women empowerment campaigns.

== Advocacy ==
Oppong-Yeboah has covered the UN Commission on the Status of Women and also the UN Convention on the Rights of Persons with Disabilities at the UN headquarters. She took part in an interview in the 2022 International Women's Day celebration where she said "when female media practitioners – who better understand the problems of women – take interest in highlighting the challenges of women in society, it would help in addressing same".
