= Ghana CARES =

Ghana COVID-19 Alleviation and Revitalisation of Enterprises Support (Ghana CARES) was launched by Nana Akufo-Addo on 18 November 2020 in Accra. Some source also claimed it was launched by Yaw Osafo-Maafo. The program is in two phases. It is also known as "Obaatan Pa”. The program is claimed to serve as a 'blueprint' for Ghana's economy recovery post COVID-19. According to Osei Kyei Mensah Bonsu, the Ghana CARES program 'is the boldest and biggest economic recovery program in the country's history, will enable the country to turn the challenges created by COVID-19 into opportunities for socioeconomic transformation'.

== Phases ==
The initiative was sequenced in two phases:

1. Stabilisation Phase that would run from July to the end of the year (2020); and
2. Medium-term Revitalisation Phase (to be implemented from 2021 to 2023) would revitalise the economy and accelerate the Ghana Beyond Aid transformation agenda.

== Aims ==
- To inject GH¢100 billion into Ghana's economy in 3years to aid in the protection of lives.
- Revive and Revitalise businesses
- Stimulate and transform the economy
- Narrow the fiscal deficit.

== Partners ==
1. IMF
2. World Bank
3. African Development Bank Group
4. EU
