= Timeline of the COVID-19 pandemic in Ghana =

Timeline of the COVID-19 pandemic in Ghana may refer to:

- Timeline of the COVID-19 pandemic in Ghana (March–July 2020)
- Timeline of the COVID-19 pandemic in Ghana (August–December 2020)
- Timeline of the COVID-19 pandemic in Ghana (2021)
- Timeline of the COVID-19 pandemic in Ghana (2022)
