= Accra Girls Senior High School =

Senior High School

Location
- 37 Military Hospital Road, Opposite Choice FM, North Ridge; Greater Accra Region; Accra; Ghana; 5°35′49″N 0°11′43″W

Information
- Other name: AGISS
- Type: All girls school
- Motto: Aim High
- Established: 30 September 1960 (66 years ago)
- School district: Accra Metropolitan District
- Head of school: Gifty Andoh
- Grades: Forms (1–3)
- Campus type: Urban
- Colors: Green and white
- Athletics: Track and field
- Athletics conference: 2nd Cycle Schools and Colleges Sports Federation Festival (zonal athletics, super-zonal athletics)
- Website: accragirlsshs.com

Accra Girls Senior High School is an all female second cycle institution in Accra in the Greater Accra Region, Ghana. It operates as a non-denominational day and boarding school. It runs courses in business, general science, general arts, home economics and visual arts, leading to the award of a West African Senior High School Certificate (WASSCE).

In 1960, Accra Girls Senior High was founded as a Ghana Education Trust institution. Under the direction of expatriate Blanche Gibson, the school officially opened on September 30, 1960. "Aim High" is the school's motto. The school's code is 0010112 and category is A.

== Notable alumni ==
- Hannah Afriyie, Ghanaian athlete
- Nana Akua Owusu Afriyie, Ghanaian politician
- Alice Annum, Ghanaian athlete
- Moesha Buduong, Ghanaian television personality, actress, and model
- Dzigbordi Dosoo, Ghanaian businesswoman
- Dr. Rose Mensah-Kutin, Ghanaian gender advocate and journalist
- Cynthia Mamle Morrison, Ghanaian politician
- Tina Gifty Naa Ayele Mensah, Ghanaian politician
- Evelyn Amarteifio - Ghanaian women's organiser
- Josephine Oppong-Yeboah - Ghanaian broadcast journalist, gender advocate and news anchor at Metro TV Ghana
