= Ministry of Education (Ghana) =

Ghanaian ministry responsible for education

- Ministry of Education and All Levels of Learning

Ministry overview
- Formed: 1951; 75 years ago
- Preceding agencies: Ministry of Education and Culture; (Education departments under colonial administration, pre-1951)
- Jurisdiction: Government of Ghana
- Headquarters: Accra, Greater Accra Region, Ghana; 5.55602°N 0.1969°W
- Employees: ~ 1,500
- Minister responsible: Haruna Iddrisu, Minister for Education
- Parent Ministry: Government of Ghana
- Child agencies: Ghana Education Service (GES); National Council for Curriculum and Assessment (NaCCA); Ghana Tertiary Education Commission (GTEC); National Teaching Council (NTC)
- Website: moe.gov.gh

The Ministry of Education of Ghana is the government ministry responsible for formulating and implementing national educational policies, overseeing all levels of education from basic schools to tertiary institutions. The ministry manages curriculum development, teacher training, educational infrastructure, and supervises educational agencies including the Ghana Education Service (GES), the National Council for Curriculum and Assessment (NaCCA), and the Ghana Tertiary Education Commission (GTEC).

The Ministry of Education was established under the Civil Service Law 327 and under the PNDC Law 1993 with the mandate to provide relevant education to all Ghanaians.

== History ==
The Ministry of Education was established in 1951 during the colonial period to coordinate and manage the educational system in the Gold Coast. Its first head was Kojo Botsio, who later became the first Minister for Education in independent Ghana.

During the administration of Kwame Nkrumah, the ministry oversaw investments in teacher training colleges, secondary schools, and technical institutes. The ministry’s structure and functions were subsequently influenced by political changes, including periods of military rule under the National Liberation Council, the National Redemption Council, and the Provisional National Defence Council.

== Agencies ==
- Ghana Education Service
- Ghana Tertiary Education Commission
- West African Examinations Council
- Commission For Technical And Vocational Training
- Ghana Library Authority
- Ghana Academy of Art and Science
- Funds And Procurement Management Unit
- Ghana Commission for UNESCO
- National Inspectorate Board
- National Council for Curriculum and Assessment
- National Teaching Council
- Ghana Book Development Council
- Center for National Distance Learning and Open Schooling
- National School Inspectorate Authority
- Complementary Education Agency [formerly Non-Formal Education Division]
- Ghana Tertiary Education Council
- Scholarship Secretariat
- Ghana Education Trust Fund
- Council For Technical And Vocational Educational Training
- National Board For Professional And Technicians Examination Ghana
- National Service Scheme

== Ministers ==
- Haruna Iddrisu

== Board of advisors ==
Every Sector Minister is legally obligated to establish a Ministerial Advisory Board, which provides advice on relevant issues to their respective Ministry. Furthermore, the Advisory Board is tasked with fostering continuous engagement between the Ministry and its service users. It also advises the Minister on policy adjustments, planning objectives, and operational strategies.

- The Minister as the chairman.
- The Deputy Minister(s) of the Ministry
- The Chief Director
- The Chairman of the Ghana Education Service (GES) Council.
- The Director-General of the GES.
- A representative of the National Council on Tertiary Education (NCTE).
- A representative of the Ministry of Labour and Employment.
- A representative of the Ghana National Education Coalition (GNEC).
- A representative of the Association of Ghana Industries (AGI).
- Two Education Experts

== Projects ==
=== Key Programs ===
- Free Senior High Schools (Free SHS)
- Ghana Accountability for Learning Outcomes (GALOP)

==== Projects ====
- STEM
- TVET
- Education Reform
- ICT in Education Reform
- AI tools development in local languages

==== Virtual Learning ====
- Edmondo
- Read2Skill
- ICampus Ghana

== See also ==
- Education in Ghana
