= Ghana Education Service =

Ghanaian parastatal

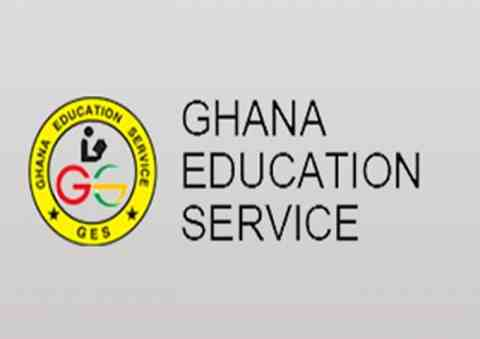

Agency overview
- Formed: 1974; 51 years ago
- Jurisdiction: Government of Ghana
- Headquarters: Ghana Education Service Headquarters (GES), Accra
- Employees: 340,000+
- Agency executive: Eric Nkansah, Director General
- Parent agency: Ministry of Education
- Website: ges.gov.gh

The Ghana Education Service (GES) is a government agency under the Ministry of Education responsible for implementing government policies that ensure that Ghanaians of school-going age irrespective of their ethnicity, gender, disability, religious and political dispositions receive quality formal education. The Ghana Education Service is governed by a fifteen-member council called the GES council.

The agency was established in 1974 by the National Redemption Council. It partners with organisations and is demarcated into various units to ensure the effective execution of its mandate to the Ghanaian society.

== History ==
The Ghana Education Service (GES) was established in 1974 as a part of the Public Service of Ghana by the National Redemption Council under the National Redemption Council Decree (NRCD 247). It was later amended by the NRCD 252, NRCD 357 and the Supreme Military Council Decree (SMCD 63). In the Constitution of the Fourth Republic, the earlier legislations have subsequently been amended by Acts of Parliament; Act 506 (1994) and Act 778 (2008).

== Functions ==
The Ghana Education Service is responsible for;

- Providing and overseeing Basic Education, Senior High Education, Technical Education as well as Special Education.
- Registering, supervising and inspecting private pre-tertiary educational institutions.
- Submitting recommendations to the Minister of Education for educational policies and programmes.
- Promoting the efficiency and full growth of talents amongst its members.
- Registering teachers and updating the register of all teachers in the public system.
- Carrying out other functions that influence the attainment of the functions specified above.
- Maintaining professional standards and conduct of its personnel.

== Collaboration ==
The following organisations and stakeholders partner the GES in the implementation of its programmes and activities:

- United Nations Children's Fund- For Education Programme.
- United States Agency for International Development- For Partnerships for Education Projects: Social Impact, Learning, Innovation and Improving Reading Performance in Primary Schools.
- Belgium/TELEVIC- For Supply and Installation of Integrated E-learning Lab for 240 Senior High Schools.
- United Kingdom for International Development- For Complementary Basic Education Programme.
- Kreditanstalt Wiederaufbau (KfW)- For Supporting Vocational Training: Voucher Programme.
- World Bank- For Ghana Secondary Education Improvement Project.
- Kuwait- For Expansion and Development of 26 Existing Senior High School Project.

== Current programmes ==
The current programs being run by the Ghana Education Service are:

- Complementary Basic Education (CBE) programme: A learning initiative targeting out of School Children (OOSC) between the ages of 8 and 14 from some of the poorest areas of the country. The program seeks to assist children learn to read, write, and numerate within nine months.
- Secondary Education Improvement Project (SEIP): It was implemented in September 2017 in pursuant of Article 25 1b of the 1992 Constitution, which states that “Secondary education in its different forms including technical and vocational education, shall be made generally available and accessible to all by every appropriate means, and in particular, by the progressive introduction of free education.”
- Special and Inclusive Education (SIE) programme.
- Pre-tertiary Education Management programme.

== Divisions ==
- Guidance And Counselling (G&C) Unit- A division whose main goal is to help individuals discover and develop their educational, vocational and psychological potentials and consequently achieve an optimal level of personal happiness.
- School Health Education Programme (SHEP) Unit- This unit's mandate is to ensure that comprehensive health and nutrition education and related support services are provided in schools to equip children with basic life skills for healthy living, which will lead to improvements in child survival and educational outcomes, including school enrolment, retention and academic performance.
- Special Education Division (SPED)- This division is responsible for creating equal educational opportunities for learners and young people with disabilities and special educational needs by providing suitable and sustainable support structures in an inclusive school environment.
- Secondary Education Division- This division assists the Ghana Education Service in implementing and monitoring Ministry of Education policies, providing guidelines on equitable access to education, improving quality education, effectively managing education, and promoting and demystify Science, Mathematics, Technology & Engineering at the Second Cycle level.
- Basic Education Division- This division consists of the main section and three other units: Early Childhood Education Unit (ECE), Private Schools Unit and the Girls' Education Unit (GEU). Its mandate is to ensure basic education in the country is delivered effectively and efficiently.
- Technical and Vocational Education Division- This division is responsible for the implementation of pre-tertiary Technical and Vocational Education under the Ministry of Education.

== See also ==
- Ministry of Education
- Education in Ghana
- Free SHS
