= Timeline of the COVID-19 pandemic in Ghana (2021–2022) =

Timeline of pandemic in Ghana

The following is a timeline of the COVID-19 pandemic in Ghana during 2021-2022.

== Timeline ==
=== January 2021 ===
- Model-based simulations indicate that the 95% confidence interval for the time-varying reproduction number R_{t} was higher than 1.0 in January.
- On 1 January, hundreds of worshipers massed up at a chapel defying the COVID-19 safety protocols. Most people in a church in the Central region were not having nose masks on. The president was claimed to have prayed for a COVID-19-free for the country, and hopeful the country would deal with the pandemic in 2021.
- On 2 January, people gathered at a beach without adhering to the COVID-19 safety protocols. A pastor claimed sermons in the Church would spark up because of the restrictions on religious activities due to the pandemic. The pandemic affected the fashion industry as majority of people use nose masks in their manner of dressing.
- On 3 January, a nurse warned the public against trying on nose masks before purchasing. The president advised Ghanaians to observe the safety protocols as acquiring the vaccine was being worked on, he also claimed there was no case of the new COVID-19 variant in the country. A pastor held sermons virtually due to COVID-19.
- On 4 January, the president claimed the country would strengthen its airport restrictions due to the wake of the new variant of COVID-19, he also claimed he would protect students from contracting the virus. Some parents in Koforidua pleaded with the government to absorb fees of students in private schools due to the impact of the pandemic. An association wanted the government to suspend the reopening of the basic school level because of their vulnerability to COVID-19. An association lauded the Government for reopening schools and called on the government to make available the protocols. IMF claimed it spent $11.3billion on Ghana and other countries since the pandemic began last year. The Information Minister provided updates on Ghana's fight against the virus.
- On 5 January, it was disclosed less than 500 private schools received the government package issued by NBSSI. The president claimed COVID-19 threatened to divert the progress of his administration. Parents asked MoE and GES to provide safety measures before schools reopen. A coalition called on the government to provide the COVID-19 protocols and the quick arrival of PPEs. The GWCL advised consumers to use water productively after the extension of free water package. Zoomlion acquired new vehicles and equipment for fumigation to curb the spread of the virus.
- On 6 January, the CEO of a company advised business owners to strategize to help the businesses in surviving during the pandemic. Some parents were worried the class size would make it difficult for some schools to observe social distancing. An association were worried the government denied paying salaries to private school teachers during the COVID-19 crisis. An association also claimed about 126 private schools collapsed due to the outbreak of the pandemic. A group were worried schools were to be reopened claiming it might cause the second wave of the pandemic. It was revealed more than 15,200 businesses received financial support from the NBSSI/MasterCard Foundation partnership. A senior lecturer at UG claimed the pandemic should not be a reason the government's inability to fulfil promises made. Some residents in Takoradi/Sekondi were claimed to have no nose mask on in their daily activities. The Annual New Year School program was shortened to 2 days due to COVID-19. Health workers in the Obusi East District were advised to continue the fight against COVID-19. Private schools in Kumasi claimed they were affected by the outbreak of COVID-19.
- On 7 January, the VP of GMA claimed the government, MoE and GES should close down any school who disregard the safety protocols. The ECG and GWCL activated the supply of electricity and water free of charge to consumers under the COVID-19 relief package. Parents were advised to sensitize their children on the safety protocols.
- On 8 January, stakeholders in the education sector were encouraged to use online tools and applications to teach SEND children post-COVID-19. The president of an association claimed the hotel industry was watching what was going on in other nations due to COVID-19. It was claimed COVID-19 affected the aviation and tourism sectors in terms of job creation and others. It was also claimed PWDs and other groups were left out in the COVID-19 intervention by the government.
- On 9 January, a teacher suggested schools should be disinfected on quarterly basis to curb the spread of the virus. An association urged the government to bring about protocols and guidelines for disposal of PPEs for students.
- On 10 January, it was revealed Ghana and other nations received financial support from IMF. Some parents in Greater Accra region were worried because of the reopening of schools. The management of BTU claimed the institution would adhere to the COVID-19 protocols.
- On 11 January, an MP cautioned Ghanaians there was an increase in the number of COVID-19 infections. The UK Visa Application Center in Accra shut down their office as the UK was an epic centre for COVID-19. Traders in some areas of Accra stopped the using of hand sanitizers and the putting on of nose masks. Traders in stationery expected more sales after schools were reopened. Health officials cautioned the public to observe the safety protocols in public places etc. Past students of KNUST donated PPEs to an orphanage.
- On 12 January, GJA appealed to the Presidency consider a stimulus package for journalists due to the pandemic. COVID-19 Taskforce was launched in the Central region to check the pandemic's situation. The president of GMA claimed the non-adherence of the safety protocols caused the rise of COVID-19 in Ghana, it also blamed the Government for letting its guard down, it also warned Ghanaians to observe the safety protocols to avoid a lock down. A coalition of NGOs in health blamed some institutions for not enforcing a policy in their workplace. An MP appealed to the Presidency to consider a COVID-19 relief package for first-year tertiary students. Most people abandoned the putting on of nose masks in the markets of Accra. BTU established a COVID-19 taskforce. An Educationist claimed children are less at risk of contracting the virus. Parents were advised to provide their wards with the necessary PPEs. Bookshop operators claimed their businesses were improving after it was announced schools are to be reopened. The GMA charged the NCCE to start educating the public on the COVID-19 vaccines.
- On 13 January, some COVID-19 patients complained they were not given food at the Tamale Treatment Centre. FDA denied it has approved a COVID-19 vaccine in Ghana. The Takoradi Veterinary Laboratory claimed it recorded about 30% of tested samples of COVID-19 rate. An officer of GUTA commended the Government for reopening of schools. The president of GMA denied a report made by a newspaper concerning a total lock down. A patient who recovered from the virus advised Ghanaians to abide by the safety protocols. Dealers in nose mask in Accra made sales due to the reopening of schools. The executive director of an institution claimed PPEs do not guarantee protection against the virus. TUC-Ghana advised its members to adhere to the COVID-19 protocols.
- On 14 January, the GMA claimed Ghana's COVID-19 situation is alarming which might cause rise in cases. Students at TTU were satisfied with the institution's compliance to the safety protocols. An association claimed 51 girls got pregnant because of the shut down of schools due to the pandemic. A US-based Ghanaian cautioned the public to observe the safety protocols. Isolation centers in Ashanti region were reopened due to the increase of inactive cases. It was revealed there was an increase in COVID-19 cases in the Western region. An MP donated face masks to the Municipal Education Directorate in Ho Central. Residents in Aflao claimed they did not benefit from the relief package announced by the government. About 60% of beds in COVID-19 designated centers were claimed to be full.
- On 15 January, the CEO of a chamber cautioned about the rise in COVID-19 cases and its effects on the health system. UDS launched a five-member COVID-19 response committee. KNUST students praised the safety protocols put in place by the school authorities. An Authority adopted ways to help school owners return to school amidst COVID-19. An Association claimed children who stay at home because of fear of contracting the virus would bring problems. WTA students would receive guidance and counselling prevent them from fears of contracting the virus. The CE of KATH urged the media to tight their advocacy roles for Ghanaians to observe the protocols. Some schools in Akim-Oda claimed they would comply to the safety measures after returning to school. An NGO called for the safeguarding the female child due to the pandemic. Teachers and parents were urged to educate the children on the COVID-19 protocols. Students of UG were advised to be accountable for the compliance of the safety protocols. The GMA appealed to the government to decrease the amount for the COVID-19 test or make it free, and also provision of PPEs to health facilities. An educationist appealed to the government to add teachers to front line workers amid the pandemic.
- On 16 January, an association intended to audit all schools to establish if PPEs were delivered from the government. The chairperson of the National COVID-19 Trust Fund advised Ghanaians to adhere to the safety protocols. The pandemic was claimed to have affected the registration of marriages in Cape Coast. A market was built temporarily due to COVID-19 to avoid overcrowding in Tema. A headmistress claimed the pandemic affected the academic calendar. The government was blamed for abandoning Ghanaians from the spread of COVID-19. A private university assured parents of safety on campus to avoid the spread of the virus. According to an association, some private schools asked for COVID-19 test results from students. UG-City Campus new students in Accra were said to have disregarded the safety protocols during their registration exercise. A report claimed there was poor observance of the safety protocols by the public and health workers. The Upper West Regional Hospital was among the hospitals selected for the treatment of COVID-19 cases. The administration of TTU adopted a strategy to curb the spread of COVID-19 in the institution. The CEO of KATH praised the media in Ghana for their support to the hospital due to the pandemic. The Ashanti Regional Directorate of Ghana Health Service (GHS) revealed contact tracing would be done to curb the spread of the pandemic. A lecturer at UDS suggested to the GES to run a shift system for basic schools. A hospital in the Western region recorded 30 COVID-19 cases.
- On 17 January, the former deputy minister of health assured the safety of school children as they return to school, he also claimed there would be punishment for people who disregard the safety protocols. An MP appealed to the speaker of Parliament to suspend the payment of fees for students in tertiary institutions due to the impact of the pandemic. The president claimed he ordered the IGP to enforce the wearing of nose masks. An association claimed it was ready to help manage COVID-19 cases. A former MP wrote an open letter to the president concerning COVID-19. Traders in some parts of Central region disregarded the safety protocols. School children were urged to observe the safety protocols in school. NMIMR investigated into claims the institution gives false COVID-19 test results. People disregard safety protocols at funerals and other gatherings. GIJ, Dzorwulu campus was claimed to not fully adhere to the safety protocols.
- On 18 January, the GHS revealed the names of 15 laboratories certified to test for the virus. An MP visited some schools in Yendi to welcome them back to school due to the pandemic. An association in Akatsi were worried PPEs were not available on the first day of back to school. The president claimed majority of COVID-19 cases in the country were the youth. An MP called for the closure of schools for children in the lower primary and below. Some Ghanaians shared their opinions over the rise in the virus. A former MP played down claims the government is to be blamed for the rise in COVID-19 cases. A former minister advised Ghanaians to observe the safety protocols. The GMA praised the president for allowing the police to enforce the observance of the safety protocols. The GHS claimed it has secured facilities to provide care for COVID-19 patients. Some drivers in Accra asked for PPEs from government and private institutions. A private school postponed its reopening after a board member tested positive for the virus. An institute called for the MoE and the GES to suspend the reopening of schools if PPEs are not ready. An association appealed to the government to give allowances to its staff. The former Health Minister claimed government was looking at the reducing the amount paid for COVID-19 testing at KIA. An association supported the idea for the re-closure of basic schools, it also claimed teachers would be strict on students who disregard the safety protocols. Some basic schools in New Juaben South put in place the safety protocols to curb the pandemic. Schools in the Sissala East observed low regard of the safety protocols. A medical director at Tema Hospital advised Ghanaians to 'stick strictly to the COVID-19 protocols'. A former chief justice and the general secretary of GMA attributed the increase in COVID-19 cases to political rallies. GPS were tasked to lead by example in the enforcement of the COVID-19 protocols, they also claimed to roll out enforcement measures of wearing of the nose masks. A former Health Minister claimed there was no science or fact to back political campaigns were the reason the country's cases rose. An actor asked the whereabout of the COVID-19 tracker app. COVID-19 Monitoring team were formed in Hohoe to keep students safe. GPRTU claimed it would enforce the observing of the protocols at bus stations. A former deputy minister of education assured parents of school children not to panic as they returned to school. Some schools received PPEs from the government. A broadcaster alleged some health officials took bribes to change COVID-19 test results. Students of KNUST disregarded the safety protocols in a concert for new students.
- On 19 January, an association claimed its position would have different concerning the reopening of schools due to the rise in COVID-19 cases. An association also claimed the decision to go back to school was necessary. A headmaster of a school claimed social distancing was prioritised to curb the spread of COVID-19. The DCE advised students to observe the safety protocols in the school. A politician advised Ghanaians to listen to the president's call to adher to the protocols. A council replied to an association about claims the government should shut down schools. NPC supported the president's decision to enforce the COVID-19 protocols. The president of IMANI-Africa claimed the reopening of schools was ill-timed. The executive director of an institute claimed MoE and GES were 'incompetent' because schools failed to receive PPEs earlier. The executive director of an institution claimed the country was not prepared to reopen of schools. According to the Kumasi Metro Directorate of Education, schools with high population to run the shift system. A musician called on the president to stop the collection of COVID-19 testing fee at KIA. According to a unit at the GPS, there was an increase in the publication of obscene images and videos online during the lock down. An MP urged the government to conduct a free mass testing for Ghanaians, he also claimed the pandemic has revealed the gap between schools in the rural and urban areas. A professor at UG suggested to the president to place a ban on large gatherings. Headmistress of a school in Ho revealed there was a huge turnout of students back to school. Government was claimed to have delayed in the provision of PPEs. Some people in some part of Western region disregarded the observance of the safety protocols. Some parents claimed they were happy to see their children back to school. Genomic sequencing at WACCBIP indicated several cases of the UK variant and at least one case of the 501.V2 variant, while the GHS revealed the new variants had a higher and faster rate of infection. A presidential aspirant claimed the president ignoring political activities led to the rise of COVID-19 cases was irresponsible. The First Lady urged Ghanaians to put on face masks to curb the spread of the virus. An MP claimed the fight against the pandemic is a collective responsibility. Some school managements adopted ways to fight the pandemic. President of GMA urged Ghanaians to live their lives normally without COVID-19 interference. A policy analyst claimed to be disappointed by the president for failing to construct the district hospitals. A founder of a political party urged the president to lock down the country again. The CDC warned US travelers to avoid going to Ghana due to high cases in the country. The GHS claimed it would support NMIMR to investigate into the alleged falsification of COVID-19 test results.
- On 20 January, a former minister for health blamed the government for the rise of the virus in the country. A member of the COVID-19 response team claimed the way to curb the disease was to intensify global collaboration and cooperation. The speaker of Parliament told all MPs to test for the virus. A company donated PPEs to 2 schools in Kaneshie. An Assembly in the Upper East region launched a COVID-19 Recovery Plan to alleviate the impact of the pandemic. A private university claimed there was no case of COVID-19 on their campuses. AMA claimed it was considering running a shift system in the markets in the Assembly. The GHS claimed they had never stopped contact tracing of COVID-19 cases.
- On 21 January, an MP donated PPEs and other items to some schools. A clinical pharmacologist advised that Ghana should conduct clinical trials locally for the COVID-19 vaccine. A 50-bed facility meant for COVID-19 was claimed to have been left unfinished at Korle-Bu Teaching Hospital. An NGO donated PPEs and hand washing equipments to AMA.
- On 22 January, three people were said to have contracted the virus at the Walewale District Police Command. The GES claimed all schools in Ghana would receive PPEs. Two students of a school in Wa tested positive for the virus. A council in the Volta region urged people in the region to abide to the safety protocols. The Netherlands adopted new travel guidelines to curb the spread of the virus. The chairperson of ECOWAS advised its member countries to vaccinate their citizens against the virus.
- On 23 January, a COVID-19 taskforce in the Western region educated the public about the virus. An NGO donated PPEs and some items to some schools to halt the spread of the virus. A professor at UHAS appealed to the government to provide nose masks to the public, he also claimed the COVID-19 case counts were being underestimated in the country. A former minister for health suggested to the government to briefly lock down the country. A scientist urged the president to ban funerals and other large gatherings. An MP asked the government to adopt a free testing for the virus. The general secretary of GMA claimed being at home does not safeguard against the virus.
- On 24 January, Ghanaian students called for the suspension of fees payment due to the impact of the pandemic. A Ghanaian comedian urged Ghanaians to put on their nose masks. A school in the Volta region called for more PPEs. Some churches in the Volta region were reported to have reduced the use of nose masks.
- On 25 January, a teacher donated PPEs to help stop the spread of the virus. A professor claimed the new variant of COVID-19 were not 'deadlier' but spread faster. A former Deputy Health Minister claimed political activities were not to be blamed for the increase in infections, he also claimed the government reactivated contact tracing. An MP appealed to the government to provide face masks to the public. To stop the spread of the virus, only one-third of MPs were needed in the Chamber of Parliament. The president urged member states of ECOWAS to not despair due to the impact of the pandemic. The GHS claimed the new variant of the virus were not recorded in the community level in the country. GIJ suspended one of the school's campus due to 2 staffs testing positive. An association appealed to the government to test all students and staff of technical universities. The GMA urged the government to reduce people going to the funeral of JJ Rawlings, they also appealed to the government to lock down the country to stop the rise of the virus. AMA put limitation for people attending ceremonies at their city hall. A union supported the motion of suspending payment of fees at the tertiary level. 3 regions in the country with EOCs were set to receive boost to strengthen them for response to health emergencies.
- On 26 January, the GHS claimed it has increased the surveillance in the communities to check if the new variant spreads within them, it also claimed about 32% of affected patients in phase 3 were falling sick in the country. A group's medical team claimed they studied graphs plotted on the cases of the virus. A researcher at KCCR claimed the payment for the COVID-19 test should be reduced. The general secretary of GMA claimed the impact of the virus on affected persons observed was worse. The speaker of Parliament gave an ultimatum for all MPs to get tested. CCG claimed if a ban on gatherings was placed by the government, churches would shut down. ECOWAS placed the payment of COVID-19 PCR test for member states traveling within the region at $50. A lecturer claimed the government would face difficulties if parliament approves the motion of suspension of fees for tertiary students. GPRTU claimed it would punish drivers who disregard the safety protocols.
- On 27 January, A Health Analyst urged the banning of social gatherings as a way to help curb the spread of COVID-19. The GHS claimed the locking down the country would not reduce the rise in cases, it also claimed there was policy to prioritize COVID-19 cases. FDA cautioned Ghanaians to purchase approved Hydrogen Peroxide, it also assured Ghanaians the efficacy of PPEs the institution certified for usage. A Union in the Upper East appealed to the government to increase its package for health workers. GPS advised the public to adhere to the safety protocols. A politician urged Ghanaians to protect themselves against the virus. A Group claimed the breakdown of leadership was the cause of surge in COVID-19 infections. Some people in Accra appealed to the government to direct drivers to decrease the number of passengers in vehicles. The Ho Municipal Assembly released a statement to begin enforcement of the safety protocols.
- On 28 January, MoH ordered public COVID-19 testing labs not to charge Ghanaians for COVID-19 testing. A study in Ghana claimed about 50% of Ghanaians were misled concerning COVID-19. A director of Health Unit at GPHA claimed the country needs to be cautious in easing restrictions. A medical officer at GPHA claimed the port was inquiring ways to intensify measures against the spread of the virus. A Medical Lab Officer at GPHA diminished claims by some people concerning COVID-19 test results being compromised. Two people tested positive for the virus during a program in Koforidua. Some businesspersons in Accra expressed mixed feelings concerning the possible second lock down. The GPRTU in the Bono region created a COVID-19 taskforce to enforce the safety protocols. A researcher appealed to the government to randomly test for the new variant of COVID-19. GP claimed they would begin checking vehicles to ensure passengers put on the nose masks. An NGO in partnership with the UK Government and Unilever donated PPEs and other items to AMA and others.
- On 29 January, KATH recorded 25 positive cases of the virus since the outbreak in the country, nine children tested positive at the facility. The speaker of Parliament claimed some MPs contracted the virus. Courts in the country were ordered to run shift system. It was disclosed some health workers at KATH attend to patients with no nose masks on. People in the Central region were sensitized to put on nose masks. The GHS claimed there was an increase of the virus at workplaces.
- On 30 January, a former minister advised Ghanaians to adhere to the safety protocols as the country awaits the vaccine. The GMA appealed to the government to put a ban on social gatherings. A professor appealed to the government to employ nurses to assist in the increasing COVID-19 cases. A businessman advised young persons post-COVID-19. The National House of Chiefs advised the public to observe the safety protocols. An NGO donated some items to some schools in Obuasi. A political activist donated some items to some churches. The regional director of GHS in the Bono East urged the government to declare a 28-days compulsory wearing of nose masks.
- On 31 January, the government was asked to place a ban on the use of shisha in the country. The GP claimed it engaged with district assemblies and others to assisit in the enforcement of the safety protocols. The 2021 Spelling Bee would be held behind closed doors due to the pandemic. A political party appealed to the government to reintroduce the restrictions in vehicles to halt the spread of the virus. A pastor claimed the country needed 'a tough and benevolent dictatorship leadership' to fight the spread of the virus. The president claimed the country was averaging about 700 new cases of COVID-19 daily.

=== February 2021 ===
- On 1 February, a minister-designate appealed to the government to reintroduce learning under trees to curb the spread of the virus. Mortuary workers alleged government massaged COVID-19 deaths. FDA nabbed 2 people for claiming to have a cure for COVID-19. The president of GMA questioned why the government did not shut down religious institutions. Ghanaians were cautioned the virus was real. A foundation provided some hospitals with beds to contain the intake of COVID-19 patients. The administration of KNUST suspended shuttle services on campus. COVID-19 management team at KATH threatened to lay down their tools due to unpaid allowances. South Korea provided PPEs and COVID-19 lab testing equipment to Ghana. A politician donated PPEs and other items to an orphanage in the Central region.
- On 2 February, the GHS claimed about 20 COVID-19 cases were recorded in some schools, it also claimed about 42% Ghanaians put on the nose masks correctly in a survey, it also claimed the UK COVID-19 variant spreads faster in the country. Ghanaians were advised to be referred before they were tested free for the virus. Children in the Upper West region were claimed to be contracting the virus. A directive by the Judicial Association asked courts to only preside over 'urgent cases'. A public health specialist claimed there was a need for a more balanced information on the threat of the virus. The Health Directorate in the Volta region blamed the increase of the virus on disregarding the safety protocols. A former medical director appealed to the government to lift taxes on PPEs. Management of KIA revealed some measures to be followed by travelers into the country. A professor claimed the rise in COVID-19 in the country was of no scientific novelty. Ridge Hospital's COVID-19 ICU was claimed to have run out of oxygen. A pharmacist claimed the country must diversify its sources for the vaccine of the virus.
- On 3 February, the association of mortuary workers in the country cautioned of congestion at the morgues due to the ban of large gatherings. A health economist urged the government to focus on protecting informal sector workers from the virus. Vodafone Ghana donated PPEs and some items to a hospital. The GFA advised Match Commissioners to enforce Club Safety and Security Officers observe the safety protocols.
- On 4 February, about 29 people tested positive for the virus in a school, Others also claimed it was 40 confirmed cases. After about 15 MPs tested positive for the virus, the Parliament decided to sit twice per week. A conducted research revealed the country had a shortage of hospital beds. A Relation Analyst claimed some travelers used illegal routes in Ghana because of the amount charged at the airport. Due to the demand of nose masks, there was an increase in the price. A doctor at Greater Accra Regional Hospital claimed recovered patients of COVID-19 report back with complications, he also claimed the hospital took new equipment to help in the test for the virus. GMA warned the public FDA and other organizations did not approve Hydrogen peroxide as treatment for the virus. A director in UG advised suspected COVID-19 patients to be at home while waiting for results of tests.
- On 5 February, the MP of New Juaben South advised teachers to enforce the safety protocols. 42 students tested positive for the virus in Akosombo. VRA urged for calmness after it was confirmed some students contracted the virus. An MP claimed the parliament should be closed after some people tested positive for the virus. Bans on large gatherings had an impact on coffin makers. A club donated PPEs to UGMC and Ga East hospital. The chairman of a football club condemned the disregarding of the protocols by the club's fans. World Vision partnered an organization to launch COVID-19 infection prevention project in Accra. COCOBOD claimed cocoa products contains antioxidants to fight COVID-19. Municipal Chief Executive of Sunyani donated PPEs to be disbursed to schools.
- On 6 February, Archbishop of Cape Coast tested positive for the virus. A Former Deputy Health Minister claimed public education needed before the COVID-19 vaccine arrives. A research facility in UG claimed the new UK COVID-19 variant was spreading in the country. The GMA advised the public to disregard any misinformation concerning the COVID-19 vaccine. Fears of workers about COVID-19 at the Ministry of Justice was reduced. An organization donated PPEs to private schools and had a meeting to discuss COVID-19. A Pharmacist urged the government to review public transport system. Parliament tightened protocols after some MPs contracted the virus. 4 NGOs received nose masks from a delegation of EU to Ghana in partnership with a fashion industry. Director-general of GSA claimed pregnant women and others would not be vaccinated against the virus.
- On 7 February, a researcher at KCCR claimed the country's ability to collect, interpret and release COVID-19 data limited. The former minister for communication claimed he was surprised the government decided not to administer the COVID-19 vaccines to the aged and others, he also urged the government to publish the vaccine rollout plan for the country. The CCG urged churches in Ghana to adhere to the safety protocols. A lecturer at UGBS appealed to the government to secure more COVID-19 vaccines. A network donated PPEs to some schools in the Central region.
- On 8 February, about 90% of tested COVID-19 samples were confirmed to be the UK COVID-19 variant. The US Embassy in Ghana suspended visa appointments. The Supervisor of a Lab in Takoradi claimed the eyes could be a source of transmission of the virus. The director of Infectious Disease Center in Ghana urged Ghanaians against self-medication of the virus. An organization appealed for the suspension of physical meetings in the Parliament house. A professor at UG urged for more observance of the safety protocols. GMA called for the closure of schools to curb the spread of the virus. Greater Accra Regional Hospital's COVID-19 response team claimed the testing facility in the hospital was complete. 37 more students tested positive for the virus in AIS.
- On 9 February, the parliament of Ghana shut down for three weeks, although the Appointments Committee met to vet Government ministerial nominees. A Vaccine Professional claimed Ghana and other African countries were ready for the vaccine rollout. The GHS claimed there were post-COVID-19 clinics for recovered people of the virus, it also claimed Ghanaians should not be scared of the COVID-19 vaccine, it also revealed less than 50% of churches do not sanitize musical instruments. Administration of KIA reviewed the protocols for passengers into the country. Some members in Parliament called for the dissolution of the COVID-19 technical advisory team of the government.
- On 10 February, AIS adopted the shift system to curb the spread of the virus. The minister of health-designate claimed the rollout of the country's COVID-19 depended on the infrastructure in place, he also claimed his ministry spent over $100 million in the fight against the pandemic. The decision to shut down the parliament house was welcomed by MPs. Veronica Bekoe launched a new type of Veronica bucket to halt the spread against the virus. GPHA claimed no COVID-19 death was recorded. More than 1,700 children were said to tested positive for the virus. A foundation donated electronic beds to KATH and others. A Doctor cautioned vehicle drivers against tagging COVID-19 a disease for the rich. Airlines who disregard the protocols were said to pay an amount of $3,500 per traveler.
- On 11 February, according to the minister-nominee for foreign affairs, COVID-19 affected the country from acquiring benefits from AfCFTA agreement, she also claimed there was an engagement between Ghana, Russia and China to secure COVID-19 vaccines. The minister-nominee for health claimed COVID-19 treatment centers were expected to be finished in 2021. The GHS Directorate in the Asutifi North claimed taking samples to KCCR was a problem. Accra and Kumasi were said to be the first places to receive the vaccines. PWDs were said to have been affected by the pandemic.
- On 12 February, a group awarded beneficiaries of the Women COVID-19 Stimulus Fund. Administration of UEW visited learning centers to observe the compliance of the safety protocols. FDA discussed on the Cuban COVID-19 vaccine.
- On 13 February, the public were advised on the effects of the virus. It was revealed pregnant women and children under 16 would not be vaccinated. The GHS claimed the COVID-19 vaccine would be free of charge for Ghanaians. 8 persons tested positive for the virus in Sefwi Wiawso College of Education. Communities in Ghana were advised to help government in the fight against the virus. UEW created COVID-19 task-force among staff and students.
- On 14 February, some MPs in Ghana were blamed for the lack of compliance of the safety protocols by Ghanaians. An investigation took place in the Bono region for an alleged vaccination of COVID-19. It was revealed there was pressure on facilities handling testing of the virus and contact tracing. Health workers were claimed to have not rested ever since it was confirmed COVID-19 was in the country. The GHS educated about 3,000 people on the prevention of the virus in some markets in Accra.
- On 15 February, according to Ursula Owusu-Ekuful, the nation's COVID-19 Tracker App was built for free. 3 petroleum workers tested positive for the virus. Ghana was said to need over $51 million for COVID-19 vaccination. The Independence Day parade was suspended by the president to halt the spread of the virus.
- On 16 February, the pandemic was blamed for the inability for the Ministry of Roads and Highways to pay road contractors. NCCE was charged by the NCC to use innovative methods to educate the public about the virus. Students at UGMS were said to have conducted a survey on COVID-19 protocols. Cuba agreed to offer the Ghanaian pharmaceutical industry with technology on a COVID-19 vaccine called 'Soberana 02'.
- On 17 February, an alleged treason case was adjourned because of the rise of COVID-19 in Ghana. The GMA claimed the rise in deaths of the virus was due to inadequate access to healthcare facilities. Ambassador of Germany to Ghana claimed Ghana's travel standing under Germany's travel ban list could change due to the rise in COVID-19 cases. Some schools in Ashanti region received PPEs.
- On 18 February, 12 new cases of the virus was recorded at FPSO John Agyekum Kufuor. Drivers and passengers in some lorry stations received nose masks from Fido Micro Credit. Some basic schools in the Eastern region reintroduced the shift system to curb the spread of the virus. The Government of UK claimed it would help Ghana due to the impact of the pandemic.
- On 19 February, some government officials volunteered to be vaccinated publicly to educate the masses. Eduwatch appealed to the government to enforce the protocols in schools. About 15 students in Western region contracted the virus. FDA claimed they authorized two vaccines of COVID-19 in Ghana. A rollout plan for the COVID-19 vaccination was revealed. Special schools in the Northern region were educated on COVID-19 management by the NCCE. Ashanti regional GMA appealed for better infrastructure to help in the management of COVID-19 patients. The GHS claimed the country's active cases were not increasing but high at a 'stagnant' position.
- On 20 February, Russia's Sputnik V was approved by Ghana to fight the virus. The GHS claimed about 12,500 vaccinators would be deployed for the COVID-19 vaccination exercise. Inmates and Prison officers adhered to the safety protocols with the help of COVID-19 management team. Ghanaians were asked to be ready for the COVID-19 vaccination, and asked the public to disregard myths about the vaccines.
- On 21 February, it was reported some investment institutions closed with loss of jobs due to the pandemic. The queen mother of Agona Traditional Area presented PPEs to some schools in the area. Government was applauded for the supply of COVID-19 logistics in schools to curb the spread of the virus.
- On 22 February, the country was claimed to receive the COVID-19 vaccine during the week, the first batch of the vaccines were expected on this day. Pentecost Church in Ghana cautioned its members against the spread of COVID-19 vaccines myth. Dr. John Amoasi claimed the country would not meet the 70% mark for vaccination of the public. 37 Hospital and Ga East Hospital released COVID-19 autopsy results to help understand and manage the virus. Producers of herbal medicine in the country appealed for the support of the government to produce COVID-19 treatments.
- On 23 February, issues concerning the agreement of the COVID-19 testing at KIA was clarified by Kwaku Asiamah. NADMO sensitized the public concerning the new COVID-19 variant. Yofi Grant claimed despite the new COVID-19 variant, the country would attract FDIs. The public were advised to adhere to the government's administration of COVID-19 vaccines. Ghana and some other countries were suspended by Oman to curb the spread of the virus.
- On 24 February, an association urged its members to be vaccinated. Some health facilities would receive 600,000 doses of AstraZeneca. Government was urged to sensitize the public on the COVID-19 vaccine. A company decided to provide free oxygen refilling to hospitals in Ghana. Health workers and others were claimed to be the first to be vaccinated. The Program Manager of GHS claimed the country has adequate storage facilities for the vaccines.
- On 25 February, President Akufo-Addo was the first to receive the COVID-19 vaccine. FDA approved the Sputnik V and Covishielf use in the country. UK High Commissioner to Ghana praised Ghana because it was the first African country to secure the COVID-19 vaccine. The country was expected to receive COVID-19 vaccines from India.
- On 26 February, Zipline partnered with UPS and its foundation to support Government in the COVID-19 vaccine delivery. The Catholic Archbishop urged the public to assist the government against the pandemic. Alex Dodoo claimed the country might 'fully open up' its economy before 2021 ends. The GHS claimed the country might be opened up if the COVID-19 vaccination succeeded. HealthTech Ghana presented medical equipment to UGMC to assist in the fight against COVID-19. MTN donated an amount to help in the COVID-19 vaccination program.
- On 27 February, Dr. Okoe-Boye claimed information concerning the COVID-19 vaccination was developed to educate the public. Dr. Nsiah-Asare claimed the COVID-19 vaccines are not for sale, He also claimed government bought COVID-19 vaccines through direct sources. The CEO of a pharmacy claimed health workers should have been the first to be administered with the vaccine. FDA assured the public on the efficacy of the COVID-19 vaccine.
- On 28 February, President Akufo-Addo addressed the country on the fight against COVID-19, he claimed two different health centres would vaccinate his family and Bawumia's family, he also claimed Ghana could develop and manufacture its own vaccines by setting up a committee, he also claimed the COVID-19 vaccine is safe. FDA and WHO approved Artesunate-Pyronaridine for clinical trials for the virus.

=== March 2021 ===
- On 1 March, Bureau of Public Safety urged the government to check on those who receive the AstraZeneca. Mahamudu Bawumia and Samira Bawumia received their vaccination against the virus at the Police Hospital President Akufo-Addo and Rebecca Akufo-Addo received the vaccines too. Dr. Nsiah-Asare claimed a public sensitization team was established concerning the vaccines. Ghanaians were urged to take the vaccine to reduce the impact of the virus. NCCE in the Central region decided to educate the public on the COVID-19 vaccine. Some healthcare workers claimed they were excited the country started the vaccination exercise.
- On 2 March, 12 cases of COVID-19 were recorded in the Parliament house. Former presidents John Mahama and John Agyekum Kufuor, Lordina Mahama, Otumfuo Osei Tutu II and his wife, and others received the vaccines. COVID-19 vaccination was launched in the Ashanti region. COVID-19 Private Sector Fund of Ghana decided to assist the vaccination program. India pledged to provide Ghana with 50,000 COVID-19 vaccines. Zipline delivered COVID-19 vaccines to some hospitals across the country.
- On 3 March, members of some teachers union encouraged their staff to get involved in the vaccination exercise. AMA claimed they had all the logistics needed for the vaccination exercise. 300 boxes of immune boosters were delivered to KATH for some health workers. Residents of Awutu-Senya District were encouraged to go for the vaccination. Alban Bagbin claimed about 6,000 doses of the COVID-19 vaccines would be needed in the parliament house. Osman Sharubutu with his family received the vaccine.
- On 4 March, Catholics in the country were urged to receive the COVID-19 vaccine. Zoompak Ghana Limited claimed it was ready to dispose off medical waste from the COVID-19 vaccination exercise. 10 cases of COVID-19 was recorded at the Ada Senior High School. Savelugu Hospital began full operations after shutting down.
- On 5 March, Ashanti region Health Directorate claimed about 10,000 people received the vaccine. India provided about 50,000 COVID-19 vaccines to Ghana. More COVID-19 vaccines were expected from COVAX, Syndex, and others. Almost 70,000 people received the vaccines. Some schools in the Central and Ashanti regions received over GH¢600,000 worth of items. A women group in Newmont Ghana donated some items to 3 schools to assist in the fight against the virus.
- On 6 March, NHIA extended its working hours to avoid overcrowding due to the virus. Customs officials of GRA in Tema received the COVID-19 vaccine. Personnel of GPS and staff of VRA took part in the vaccination exercise. Ghanaians were encouraged to take the COVID-19 vaccine. Alban Bagbin and parliamentarians received the vaccine.
- On 7 March, more than 162,000 people were claimed to have received the vaccine.
- On 8 March, an NGO urged Ghanaians to celebrate women who contribute in the response of COVID-19 in the country. Ghana's COVID-19 was claimed to have declined 'steadily'. Most female workers were said to have decided to stop work due to the fear of contracting the virus. Business owners and others were urged to be adapt new ways during the pandemic. Ghanaian women in the fight against COVID-19 were celebrated by Rebecca Akufo-Addo. More than 200,000 persons received the vaccine.
- On 9 March, the president Akufo-Addo addressed the nation concerning the pandemic. UENR outdoor COVID-19 ambassadors to educate students on campus. The country would receive two million vaccines from COVAX Facility. Dr. Okoe Boye wrote an article on how to end the pandemic. Most students who contracted the virus were said to have recovered. About 300,000 people received the vaccine. FDA cautioned the public on buying vaccines online.
- On 10 March, Kwaku Agyeman Manu revealed the challenges the country faced with the COVID-19 vaccine procurement. It was claimed the country would receive 17.6million doses of the vaccine. President Nana Akufo-Addo revealed the pandemic cost the country GH¢25.3 billion. Government denied a report of sanctioning persons who decline taking the COVID-19 vaccine. Women in the communities and others were praised for their help in fighting the virus.
- On 11 March, Dr. Mahamudu Bawumia claimed the pandemic is a wake up call for countries in Africa to co-operate in sustaining the continent. C.K Akonor was claimed to experiment with his team due to the impact of the pandemic. The CEO of the Ghana Employers Association called for the mandatory vaccination for all workers.
- On 12 March, a year since Ghana recorded its first COVID-19 case. According to Nsiah-Asare, the country is not seeing any effects of the COVID-19 vaccine. Kwahu Traditional Council suspended 2021 Easter activities due to the pandemic. A church supported the mass vaccination of the public against the virus.
- On 13 March, Kwame Sarpong Asiedu, a pharmacist claimed the public should disregard reports on AstraZeneca vaccines causing blood clots. The GHS claimed the COVID-19 vaccines are more than enough on the country. A new state of the art COVID-19 testing facility called GeneLab (www.genelabgh.com) was opened in East Legon.
- On 14 March, more than 400,000 persons have received the vaccine. Samuel Okudzeto Ablakwa appealed to the government to raise the budgetary allocation for NCCE.
- On 15 March, it was claimed there was an increase of cyber crime during the pandemic. More than 60,300 health personnel were reported to have received the vaccine in 3 regions. The media was encouraged to provide information on the COVID-19 vaccine.
- On 16 March, it was claimed by the GHS that about 1,000 reports of the effects of the vaccine on persons who were vaccinated. FDA claimed there was no case of reported blood clots caused by the vaccine in Ghana. Government of The Netherlands decided to assist Ghana with COVAX vaccines. The GHS increased the percentage for COVID-19 Testing Labs in the country to 80%. Ken Ofori-Atta recovered from the virus.
- On 17 March, CBG donated some items to KNUST and SDA Hospital in the Ashanti region. Fidelity Bank presented some items to Ghana Infectious Disease Center. The Health Directorate in the Greater Accra Region claimed the first phase of the COVID-19 vaccination received more than 80% of its target. Dr. Kwame Amponsah of GHS claimed the administering of Sputnik V was put on hold in Ghana due to its insufficiency, he also claimed almost all 600,000 doses of AstraZeneca were distributed in the vaccination exercise. The government was urged to assist women who lost their source of livelihood due to the pandemic.
- On 18 March, AGI claimed the new proposed taxes would be make it difficult for businesses to recover from the impact of the pandemic. 449,171 people received the AstraZeneca vaccine. A Ghanaian scientist Isabella Akyinbah Quakyi cautioned the public to adhere to the safety protocols.
- On 19 March, Government of the Netherlands applauded the government for decisions taken during the outbreak of the pandemic. FDA claimed companies in the country would be packaging COVID-19 vaccines locally. NCCE in Birim South educated the public on the COVID-19 vaccine. There was a rise in COVID-19 in the North East region.
- On 20 March, Government revealed the ways it intended to use the COVID-19 levy. Ian Walker, UK High Commissioner to Ghana suggested ways the COVID-19 vaccine could be of help to the economy of Ghana. Career women in Ghana were charged to take up leadership roles due to the impact of the pandemic. The GHS launched an investigation in an alleged theft of COVID-19 vaccines by three health workers.
- On 21 March, FDA warned against importing COVID-19 vaccines in Ghana illegally. GHS claimed over 460,000 received the vaccine, it also claimed about 90,000 health workers who are outside the COVID-19 epicenters would receive the vaccine.
- On 22 March, Ken Ofori-Atta returned to Ghana after he traveled to the USA to seek medical attention due to testing positive for the virus. KBTH received medical equipment from Eni Ghana and its partners.
- On 23 March, Kwahu Easter was called off due to the pandemic. GHS cautioned Ghanaians to continue to adhere to the safety protocols after vaccination. Some panelists discussed on innovative business models in the era of the pandemic. Health workers were encouraged to take the COVID-19 vaccine. Dora Edu-Buandoh urged for new ways to run higher institutions due to the impact of the pandemic.
- On 24 March, UNAIDS Ghana claimed COVID-19 impacted the country's progress against TB. MTN provided PPEs to three hospitals in the Ashanti region. MUSIGA launched a campaign through music and video to educate the public about the pandemic. Prof. William Kwabena Ampofo claimed his outfit had taken a decision to ensure that "all laboratories produce an 80 per cent accuracy test and none of the tests should be false negative."
- On 25 March, almost 500,000 people received the vaccine. Religious institutions and health workers urged Christians to avoid conventions and picnics during Easter. It was reported there was a decline in the country's active cases. People in Teshie were urged to take part in the vaccination exercise.
- On 26 March, GPS cautioned the public against hosting large gatherings and others. PPEs were presented to people around and in Osu. Ghanaians were urged to adhere to the safety protocols and restrictions on large gatherings during Easter. The COVID-19 vaccination exercise began in Volta and Bono regions. CCG urged churches to avoid Easter activities in public places.
- On 27 March, the GMA cautioned Ghanaians to adhere to the safety protocols during the Easter festivities. According to the director of TUC, businesses and households have not recovered from the pandemic to pay tax to assist the government. GHS claimed schools in Volta, Western, Greater Accra and Eastern Regions were the hot-spots of the virus. ICGC presented over 100,000 nose masks to psychiatric hospitals.
- On 28 March, about 421 girls were claimed to have not returned to school due to pregnancy during the pandemic. CCG urged churches to observe the Easter festivities in chapel activities. BMW Club in Ghana donated some items to UGMC and the Ga East Hospital.
- On 29 March, the president of GMA claimed the non-observance of the safety protocols due to the rollout of the vaccines was disturbing. Some football clubs were given the approval to admit their spectators in home games. GHS claimed the country's active cases dropped. Nana Ama Mcbrown, Israel Laryea, Abeiku Aggrey Santana, Emelia Brobbey and Reggie Rockstone were appointed as ambassadors for the COVID-19 National Trust Fund.
- On 30 March, GhanaFact partnered with a WHO network to tackle fake news on COVID-19. A journalist wrote an article on COVID-19 scare in the country. COVID-19 Health Recovery Levy was approved by Parliament of Ghana. Ghanaians were educated on the COVID-19 vaccines.
- On 31 March, about 9,500 health workers in the Upper West region received the vaccine. Health workers in the Bono East region were vaccinated against the virus. About 119 health workers were vaccinated in Agotime-Ziope District. A COVID-19 testing program was launched by the Christian Health Association of Ghana. GIZ launched an initiative to provide food to frontline workers and others.

=== April 2021 ===
- On 1 April, Kwaku Agyeman Manu claimed there was a decline of COVID-19 cases in the country. GHS claimed Ghana was to receive about one million doses of Russia's Sputnik-V vaccine. NMIMR was said to introduce COVID-19 antigen tests after approval from the FDA. 555,259 people received the vaccine in Ghana. Churches were encouraged to adhere to government's laid down rules. Scientists met in Accra to discuss how to fight diseases such as COVID-19 etc. President Nana Akufo-Addo claimed about 300,000 vaccines were expected in the country.
- On 2 April, Mahamudu Bawumia advised the public to comply to the safety protocols. NCCE urged the public to avoid large gatherings and others. GHS advised the public to observe the safety protocols. The pandemic's restrictions was claimed to have affected the fabric and shoe business in Sunyani. Beaches in Accra were deployed by the GPS to enforce the protocol on mass gathering.
- On 3 April, some people were arrested for allegedly defying the order of the ban placed on beaches. Ghanaians who received the vaccine initially were claimed to receive the second jab of AstraZeneca vaccines from the end of April to May. GHS urged Ghanaians to be cautious during the Easter holidays amid the pandemic.
- On 4 April, churches in the Tema metropolis were praised for observing the safety protocols during Easter. GFA banned Techiman Eleven Wonders for violating the directives laid down by the National COVID-19 Task force.
- On 5 April, GEA began training for some SMEs under the COVID-19 SME Innovation and Digitalization Support Scheme.
- On 6 April, some GIS officers in Hohoe received the COVID-19 vaccine. Korle Klottey boss praised the COVID-19 Task force for their activities during the Easter holidays. Government was urged to tread carefully in its expectation of reviving the economy due to the impact of the pandemic. A survey conducted revealed about 80% of Ghanaians were satisfied with the pandemic's response of the government. About 1,679 reports of side effects were revealed by the FDA.
- On 7 April, a comparison was made between deaths caused by road traffic accidents to COVID-19 deaths in Ghana.
- On 8 April, Jason Nelson claimed it was no sin receiving the COVID-19 vaccine.
- On 9 April, Gold Fields' Tarkwa mines claimed it has set aside $2.3 million to help in the fight against COVID-19 in its communities. WAHO provided Ghana with a second batch of PPEs. Justina Owusu-Banahene received the COVID-19 vaccine.
- On 10 April, it was reported about 647,380 people received the vaccine.
- On 11 April, according to Dr. Nsiah Asare, the government would secure more AstraZeneca vaccine for the Ghanaian population. Kurt Okraku claimed despite the pandemic, referees and other officials received payments. It was reported about 681,211 people received the AstraZeneca.
- On 12 April, OISL presented PPEs to Akropong School for the Blind. Yvonne Asamoah-Tawiah presented items including PPEs to the Eye of the Lord Orphanage in Nsawam.
- On 13 April, Mahamudu Bawumia advised Muslims to observe the safety protocols during Ramadan. Alex Djonoborh Tetteh urged Muslims to observe the safety protocols during Ramadan. Ebenezer Kojo Kum urged Muslims to pray to Allah to heal the world from the pandemic.
- On 14 April, Kofi Asamoah urged the government to reopen cinemas after they were shut due to the pandemic. Workers at Absa Ghana presented PPEs and other items to the GPS Senior Correctional Centre. NPP urged Muslims to use Ramadan to pray for an end to the pandemic. About 800,000 people received the vaccine. About 2,000 COVID-19 vaccines were claimed to expire on Friday, 16 April 2021 in the Northern region. Patrick Kuma-Aboagye stressed on the benefit of maintaining progress in the fight against COVID-19.
- On 15 April, about 480 doses of the COVID-19 vaccines were confirmed to have gone to waste in the Northern region. A report conducted by CHAG claimed the pandemic did not impact healthcare delivery in the country negatively. The Greater Accra region was claimed to have the highest number of active cases.
- On 16 April, almost all public and private health workers were claimed to have received the vaccine. Entrepreneurs were claimed to be performing quite well in terms of income despite the impact of COVID-19. NCCE in the Eastern region intensified campaign for the public to receive the vaccine. A report claimed the pandemic created avenues for corruption to continue.
- On 17 April, the government was urged to give attention to road accidents as COVID-19. Mahamudu Bawumia reminded Muslims to adhere to the safety protocols during Ramadan.
- On 18 April, the Ghana Mission in Washington DC and others presented $59,850 to the Ghana Covid-19 Private Sector Fund. GHS extended the vaccination exercise to 12 weeks, they also claimed adherence to the safety protocols and the vaccine helped in controlling the spread of the virus.
- On 19 April, GHS claimed about 345 schools recorded COVID-19 cases, they also claimed over 500 COVID-19 vaccines expired and were discarded in the Northern and Oti regions, they also assured the public of a second delivery of the vaccine. Patrick Kuma-Aboagye claimed the government is working to prevent the third outbreak of the pandemic in Ghana.
- On 20 April, the COVID-19 Health Recovery Levy was to take effect on 1 May 2021. NCCE urged the public to adhere to the safety protocols.
- On 21 April, GHS claimed the country would roll out a digital verification of COVID-19 tests. Some health experts in Ghana urged the public to receive the COVID-19 vaccine.
- On 22 April, MTN Ghana Foundation presented PPEs to Tema General Hospital to curb the spread of the virus. CRS initiated an awareness campaign to educate on the COVID-19 vaccine in the five regions in the north. About 100 women would be given opportunities to go through experiences delivered through various COVID recognised protocol methods. GHS urged the public to remain cautious of COVID-19. Patrick Kuma-Aboagye claimed Ghana received four pre-assembled P3 labs to be added to other COVID-19 testing laboratories.
- On 23 April, Edward Omane Boamah claimed the interruption of power supply would cause a risk to the safety of COVID-19 vaccines. Kofi Akpaloo claimed the consequences of illegal mining would be worse than COVID-19's impact. Over 800,000 people received the vaccine. Kwaku Agyeman-Manu claimed COVID-19 offered an opportunity for the improvement of health infrastructure.
- On 24 April, a COVID-19 testing center was inaugurated in the Northern part of Ghana.
- On 25 April, a letter received by GACL claimed there was a rise in the number of COVID-19 cases arriving into Ghana. GHS claimed COVID-19 pandemic was given 'much' attention in Ghana.
- On 26 April, Kwaku Agyeman-Manu assured the deployment of measures to halt the spread of the virus at the airport. The Minority in Parliament urged the government to restrict travels at KIA due to the rise of COVID-19 cases. UNICEF to deliver some COVID-19 vaccines to Ghana. COVID-19 cases rose up at KIA.
- On 27 April, Kojo Oppong Nkrumah claimed the Presidential COVID-19 task-force would hold a meeting concerning the increase in COVID-19 cases at KIA. A virologist at KCCR advised health authorities to put in place measures to reduce the COVID-19 cases at KIA. Dr. John Amuasi claimed it would be dangerous to suggest there was no cause of alarm following the threats of a 3rd wave of the virus. A research conducted claimed the pandemic caused an increase in domestic violence.
- On 28 April, GHS claimed Ghana would receive about 300,000 doses of AstraZeneca. MoFA claimed COVID-19 caused the shortage of yellow maize in Ghana. According to a report by GSS and others, people currently traveling between regions was the same before the outbreak of the pandemic in the country. AfCFTA's General Secretariat and others were concerned about the COVID-19 antigen test at KIA. KBTH received PPEs from MTN Ghana. Nana Akufo-Addo claimed the COVID-19 taskforce was looking to reopen cinemas.
- On 29 April, Government urged Ghanaian travellers to postpone or cancel trips to countries with hugh COVID-19 infection rates.
- On 30 April, government was urged to use the COVID-19 levy to cover vaccines and immunisation activities. EC claimed cost of 2020 elections reduced in spite of the pandemic. Da Costa Aboagye claimed KIA has a 'robust' and has one of the 'best' mechanism to reduce the importation of COVID-19 cases.

=== May 2021 ===
- Model-based simulations for Ghana indicate that the 95% confidence interval for the time-varying reproduction number R_{t} exceeded 1.0 in May.
- On 1 May, according to a GSS survey, about 770,000 employees had their wages cut off due to the pandemic. COVID-19 levy took effect. GHS started investigations at KIA due to the rise of COVID-19 cases.
- On 2 May, Occupy Ghana urged the government to investigate an event organized without the adherence of the safety protocols, and stop huge gatherings and apply the COVID-19 laws. Minority in Parliament urged the government to hasten the procurement of the second batch of the COVID-19 vaccines, they also demanded a temporary ban of flights from COVID-19 hot-spot countries. TUC claimed almost 800,000 workers had their salaries reduced due to the pandemic.
- On 3 May, Nsiah Asare claimed the non compliance of the safety protocols by the Christ Embassy Church was 'unfortunate'. Edward Omane Boamah posted on Facebook concerning the non adherence of the safety protocols by the Christ Embassy Church. Minority in Parliament urged the government to take into consideration PPP arrangements to secure the COVID-19 vaccine. Market women in Wa claimed they were unable to access the COVID-19 funds created by the government. GPS cautioned institutions who do not adhere the safety protocols.
- On 4 May, 350,000 doses of AstraZeneca were received. GMA condemned the disregard of the safety protocols by the Christ Embassy Church. GPS cautioned the organizers of a planned demonstration due to the ban of public gatherings.
- On 5 May, more than 849,500 doses of the vaccines were administered. Local pharmaceutical manufacturers claimed they were still waiting for clearance to manufacture COVID-19 vaccines locally. Beaches in the Greater Accra region were claimed to be deserted on May Day due to the ban. Ghana was part of countries whose citizens were restricted by Oman due to COVID-19.
- On 6 May, Dr. Lawrence Lartey claimed ways were in place to stop the importation of corona virus cases in Ghana through KIA. GHS received 350,000 doses of the AstraZeneca. Mahamudu Bawumia claimed COVID-19 slowed down economies globally, he also claimed no COVID-19 case was recorded at the prisons.
- On 7 May, government claimed it would start vaccinating the second doses of the COVID-19 vaccines. Four people were granted bail after there was disregard of the safety protocols in an event. More than 11,500 people in the Bono region received the COVID-19 vaccines.
- On 8 May, 3 members of the Christ Embassy Church pleaded not guilty for non-adherence of the COVID-19 ban on public gatherings. Dr. Aboagye Dacosta cautioned against demonstration by some Ghanaians to prevent the spread of the virus. The second vaccination exercise was claimed to begin on 19 May 2021. More than 3,200 prison officers and inmates received the COVID-19 vaccines in four regions.
- On 11 May, GHS claimed the AstraZeneca received would be given to those who were due for their second jabs. It was observed by Daily Graphic that many people do not comply to the safety protocols at KIA.
- On 13 May, Osman Nuhu Sharubutu cautioned Muslims in Ghana to adhere to the COVID-19 safety protocols.
- On 14 May, IMF commended Ghana for 'effectively managing' the COVID-19 pandemic. US Government in collaboration with USAID and GHS marked the end of the COVID-19 management training in Greater Accra. Dr. Richard Suu-Ire claimed animals in Ghana could be tested for COVID-19. KIA enforced the wearing of nose masks and adhering of the safety protocols. Dr. Emmanuel Srofenyo claimed COVID-19 affected blood mobilization.
- On 16 May, Nana Akufo-Addo addressed the country concerning COVID-19 management, he claimed the Restrictions Act (Act 1012) was still in force, he also claimed the second COVID-19 vaccination exercise would begin on 19 May 2021, he also claimed the government was making efforts for Ghanaians to receive the vaccine.
- On 17 May, GHS urged Ghanaians to receive the second dose of the COVID-19 and claimed the AstraZeneca is 'safe and good'. Northern region was claimed to have no active COVID-19 cases.
- On 18 May, COVID-19 was blamed for the increase of teenage pregnancies in the Upper East region. Mahamudu Bawumia claimed the pandemic has created an opportunity for businesses. Nana Akufo-Addo claimed the country would enforce the COVID-19 restrictions until herd immunity is achieved by vaccination of Ghanaians. GHS advised the public to participate in the second phase of COVID-19 vaccination. Boomplay donated PPEs and some items to the Greater Accra Regional Hospital. Patrick Kuma-Aboagye explained how the second dose of the vaccines would be administered.
- On 19 May, GHS began the inoculation of close to 360,000 people who vaccinated in March 2021. There was a turnout at certain health centres in Accra for the COVID-19 vaccination. James Aboagye claimed he is not in support for the reopening of cinemas amid the pandemic. Patrick Kuma-Aboagye claimed people who took the second dose of the vaccine would still have to put on a face mask.
- On 20 May, Public Interest & Accountability Committee claimed the pandemic and its effects on the economy affected upstream oil and gas sector in 2020. More than 13,600 people received the COVID-19 in the second round of the vaccination exercise.
- On 21 May, Ghana was selected as a possible manufacturing hub for COVID-19 Vaccine in Africa by the European Union. These was made known after a meeting between Nana Akufo-Addo and Valdis Dombrovskis.
- On 27 May, GHS claimed over 82% of its target for the second phase were vaccinated.
- On 28 May, over a million people were claimed to have received the vaccine. One person was reported to have died due to the virus.

=== June 2021 ===
- Model-based simulations for Ghana indicate that the 95% confidence interval for the time-varying reproduction number R_{t} exceeded 1.0 in June.
- On 2 June, Charles Adu Boahen claimed the pandemic cost Ghana about GHS21 billion.
- There were 952 new cases in June, bringing the total number of confirmed cases to 94,914. The death toll rose to 796. There were 1,674 active cases at the end of the month.

=== July to September 2021 ===
- Model-based simulations for Ghana indicate that the 95% confidence interval for the time-varying reproduction number R_{t} exceeded 1.0 in July.
- There were 10,080 new cases in July, raising the total number of confirmed cases to 104,994. The death toll rose to 837. There were 5,524 active cases at the end of the month.
- Model-based simulations for Ghana indicate that the 95% confidence interval for the time-varying reproduction number R_{t} dropped below 1.0 in August.
- There were 15,458 new cases in August, raising the total number of confirmed cases to 120,452. The death toll rose to 1,052. There were 6,940 active cases at the end of the month.
- Model-based simulations for Ghana indicate that the 95% confidence interval for the time-varying reproduction number R_{t} was lower than 1.0 in September.
- There were 7,030 new cases in September, bringing the total number of confirmed cases to 127,482. The death toll rose to 1,156. There were 3,088 active cases at the end of the month.

=== October to December 2021 ===
- Model-based simulations for Ghana indicate that the 95% confidence interval for the time-varying reproduction number R_{t} was stable around 0.6 in October.
- There were 2,595 new cases in October, bringing the total number of confirmed cases to 130,077. The death toll rose to 1,175. There were 1,781 active cases at the end of the month.
- There were 1,169 new cases in November, bringing the total number of confirmed cases to 131,246. The death toll rose to 1,228. There were 692 active cases at the end of the month.
- There were 15,957 new cases in December, raising the total number of confirmed cases to 147,203. The death toll rose to 1,309. There were 13,025 active cases at the end of the month. Modelling by WHO's Regional Office for Africa suggests that due to under-reporting, the true cumulative number of infections by the end of 2021 was around 14 million while the true number of COVID-19 deaths was around 4,941.

=== January to March 2022 ===
- There were 9,717 new cases in January, raising the total number of confirmed cases to 156,920. The death toll rose to 1,395. There were 1,876 active cases at the end of the month.
- There were 2,754 new cases in February, bringing the total number of confirmed cases to 159,674. The death toll rose to 1,442. There were 609 active cases at the end of the month.
- There were 1,297 new cases in March, bringing the total number of confirmed cases to 160,971. The death toll rose to 1,445. There were 58 active cases at the end of the month.

=== April to June 2022 ===
- There were 233 new cases in April, bringing the total number of confirmed cases to 161,204. The death toll remained unchanged. There were 47 active cases at the end of the month.
- There were 166 new cases in May, bringing the total number of confirmed cases to 161,370. The death toll remained unchanged. There were 44 active cases at the end of the month.
- There were 4,763 new cases in June, bringing the total number of confirmed cases to 166,133. The death toll rose to 1,450. There were 1,542 active cases at the end of the month.

=== July to September 2022 ===
- There were 1,994 new cases in July, bringing the total number of confirmed cases to 168,127. The death toll rose to 1,457. There were 283 active cases at the end of the month.
- There were 489 new cases in August, bringing the total number of confirmed cases to 168,616. The death toll rose to 1,459. There were 34 active cases at the end of the month.
- There were 769 new cases in September, bringing the total number of confirmed cases to 169,385. The death toll remained unchanged. There were 458 active cases at the end of the month.

=== October to December 2022 ===
- There were 1,322 new cases in October, bringing the total number of confirmed cases to 170,707. The death toll rose to 1,460.
- There were 316 new cases in November, bringing the total number of confirmed cases to 171,023. The death toll rose to 1,461. There were nine active cases at the end of the month.
- There were 25 new cases in December, bringing the total number of confirmed cases to 171,048. The death toll remained unchanged. There were six active cases at the end of the month.
