= Timeline of the COVID-19 pandemic in Ghana (March–July 2020) =

Timeline of ongoing pandemic in Ghana

The following is a timeline of the COVID-19 pandemic in Ghana from March 2020 to July 2020.

== Timeline ==
=== March 2020 ===
- On 11 March, President Nana Akufo-Addo directed the Minister of Finance, Ken Ofori-Atta, to make the cedi equivalent of $US100 million available to enhance Ghana's coronavirus preparedness and response plan. The President, Nana Akufo-Addo delivered a coronavirus state of the Nation Address.
- On 12 March, the Health Minister Kwaku Agyemang-Manu announced Ghana's first two cases at an emergency press briefing. The tests were performed at the Noguchi Memorial Institute for Medical Research, University of Ghana. The two cases were people who returned to the country from Norway and Turkey, making them imported cases of COVID-19 in Ghana. These two cases begun the first contact tracing process in Ghana. Of the first two cases reported in Ghana, one case was a senior officer at the Norwegian Embassy in Ghana who had returned from Norway, while the other was a staff member at the United Nations (UN) offices in Ghana who had returned from Turkey.
- On 13 March, Ghana confirmed two more cases bringing the number to four cases in the country.
- On 14 March, Ghana again confirmed two cases summing up to six cases in the country.
- On 15 March, at 10 pm, President Nana Akufo-Addo banned all public gatherings including conferences, workshops, funerals, festivals, political rallies, church activities and other related events to reduce the spread of COVID-19 at a press briefing on the state of COVID-19.
- On 16 March, the President Akufo-Addo addressed the nation on measures taken to combat coronavirus pandemic
- On 17 March, a total of 143 suspected cases had been tested for COVID-19 by the Noguchi Memorial Institute for Medical Research (NMIMR) and Kumasi Centre for Collaborative Research (KCCR) bringing the positive case count to seven (7) positive cases all imported in the Greater Accra Region of Ghana.
- The Minister of Finance, Ken Ofori-Atta, also declared in Parliament that the $100 million announced by President Akufo-Addo to fight coronavirus was not ready. This revelation by the Minister did not go down well, with many Ghanaians slamming the president for not being sincere and honest in such a precarious situation.
- Traveling to Ghana from countries which had recorded over 200 positive COVID-19 cases was strongly discouraged with non-admittance of such travelers; however, this restriction did not apply to Ghanaian citizens and people with resident permits. A web page was also created to provide official updates and information.
- On 18 March, Ghana recorded two cases which sum up to nine cases. These were confirmed by NMIMR, both Ghanaians returning from the United Kingdom and the United Arab Emirates. On the same day, three Ghanaians in Europe died from the disease.
- On 19 March, KCCR confirmed two new cases in Kumasi, the Ashanti Region of Ghana, bringing the number of confirmed cases in the country to eleven. Passport services were also suspended on this date.
- On 20 March, Ghana recorded five new cases in the Greater Accra Region, raising the total confirmed cases to sixteen. President Nana Addo Dankwa Akufo-Addo delivered his 4th State of the Nation Address in Parliament.
- On 21 March, Ghana confirmed three new cases raising the number of cases to 19 patients. At 9 pm, the president of the republic, Nana Akuffo Addo addressed the nation with Ghana's first death case from Kumasi. Two new cases were later confirmed making a total of twenty-one confirmed cases in Ghana.
- On 22 March, three new cases were confirmed in the country, hence amounting to 24 cases.
- On 23 March, three cases were recorded, summing up to 27 cases. The Local Government Minister announced the disinfection of 137 markets in the Greater Accra Region. On that same day, all beaches were closed to help contain the spread of the virus. All of the county's borders were closed for a fortnight from midnight of Sunday 22 March 2020.
- On 24 March, the Minister of Health announced 25 new confirmed cases and one new death case, hence totaling 52 COVID-19 patients and two deaths.
- On 25 March, there were 15 new cases with a third death recorded at the 37 military hospital and an update from the Ghana Health Service brought the number of cases to 68. The President, Nana Akufo-Addo delivered the third coronavirus Pandemic State of the Nation Address.
- On 26 March, 64 new cases were recorded increasing Ghana's case count to 132. On the same day, a letter written and signed by the director general of the Ghana Health Service recalled all staff on study leave into active service. This was to help accommodate the workload on health centers.
- On 27 March, Ghana confirmed three new cases totaling 137 cases. on the same day, the first case recorded in the Upper West Region was made known at a press briefing in Wa. The President addressed the nation at 11pm with an announcement that placed some key cities in Accra and Kumasi under a partial lock down, effective Monday 30 March 2020. Members of the Executive, Legislature and the Judiciary; and some services such as those that involve in production, distribution and marketing of food, beverages, pharmaceuticals, medicine, paper and plastic packages, were exempted from the restrictions. Parliament passed the Novel Coronavirus (COVID-19) National Trust Fund Act, 2020 (Act 1013) to set up a fund to receive and manage contributions and donations to support in the fight against the virus.
- On 28 March, the total number of confirmed cases rose to 141 and the total number of deaths stood at five. A special life insurance cover for the professionals at the front line dealing with the pandemic, was announced by the Ghana Health Ministry. The workers were insured under Group Life cover, with an assured sum of GHC350,000 on each life.
- On 29 March, the government of Ghana set up a quarantine center at the Northern Regional capital, Tamale, after the confirmation of 10 new cases of COVID-19 recorded in that part of the country, bringing the number of case count for COVID-19 to 152. On the same day the president inaugurated the board of trustees of the COVID-19 National Trust Fund in a brief ceremony at the Jubilee House.
- On 30 March, the partial lock down of Accra and Kumasi took effect. No new cases were recorded on this day.
- On 31 March, nine new cases were confirmed, bringing the number to 161 confirmed COVID-19 cases. The new cases were all in Accra. Three of the infected persons had returned from journeys to Germany, France and Hungary respectively.

=== April 2020 ===
- On 1 April, the number of confirmed cases reached 195 with more security checkpoints and roadblocks set up in Accra. There was a bit of heavy vehicular traffic at many of the barriers and most commercial vehicles were not allowed to cross the Tema Motorway.
- On 2 April, nine new cases were confirmed, making the total 204. All new cases were from the Greater Accra Region. The nine cases consist of four who have no contact with confirmed cases nor a travel history, four who are contacts of confirmed cases and one traveling to Ghana from Benin within the last 14 days. Two cases are in critical condition.
- On 3 April, one new case was confirmed and the total number stood at 205. The regions that have reported cases are Greater Accra (183 cases), Ashanti (9 cases), Northern (10 cases), Upper West (1 case), Eastern (1 case) and Upper East Region (1 case). There was a disinfection exercise for 266 markets in the Northern, North East and Savannah regions. At a press briefing, the director general of the Ghana Health Service, announced the commencement of local production of nose masks as part of efforts to arrest the spread of the pandemic. 49 persons who tested positive were discharged from health facilities to begin home care management.
- On 4 April, 198 markets in the Eastern Region of Ghana were disinfected as part of the drive to control the pandemic. The Ministry of Local Government and Rural Development teamed up with Moderpest Company and Zoomlion Ghana for the exercise. The Minister for Information announced in a tweet, that the closure of the borders has been extended by the president, for another fortnight effective midnight of Sunday 5 April 2020. The Ghana Health Service confirmed nine additional cases, bringing the total to 214. Six of the cases were in Accra and three in Kumasi. On 5 April 2020, no new cases were recorded.
- On 6 April, 73 new cases are confirmed and the total number of cases rises to 287. The new cases are in Accra and Kumasi.
- On 8 April, the number of confirmed rose to 313 as 26 more cases and one death are recorded. The Central Region recorded its first case. The infected person is a 57-year-old clergyman who returned to the country from the United Kingdom on 17 March 2020.
- On 9 April, Ghana's case rose to 378. It was announced by the president of Ghana during his national address to the nation. The new cases were detected as a result of ongoing contact tracing and testing exercise in the country. 15 of the new cases were in the Eastern Region.
- On 10 April, 408 cases were confirmed, with eight deaths and the disease now in the Greater Accra, Ashanti, Central, Eastern, Northern, North East, Upper East and Upper West regions. Professor Jacob Plange-Rhule, Rector of the Ghana College of Physicians and Surgeons, died from COVID-19 at University of Ghana Medical Centre in Accra.
- On 11 April, a total of 566 cases were confirmed. This came after the Ghana Health Service confirmed 158 new cases. Western and Volta regions recorded their first cases each. Western region recorded one case, whereas Volta Region recorded nine cases. Six out of the nine COVID-19 cases in the Volta Region were from Nigeria and entered Ghana illegally through unapproved routes along the Ghana-Togo border. According to the health authorities, the increasing number of cases was as a result of the ongoing enhanced surveillance. This brings the total number of affected regions in Ghana to ten.
- On 14 April, it was confirmed by the Ghana Health Service that Ghana's cases had risen to 636. 70 new cases were recorded in addition to the previous 566 cases. Also 17 were reported to have recovered from the disease. They tested negative after they were tested two consecutive times.
- On 15 April, it was confirmed by the Ghana Health Service that Ghana's cases had risen to 641. In addition to the earlier 17 that have been reported to have recovered, 66 have tested negative once and are awaiting a second test, bringing the total to 83 cases that have recovered or been discharged.
- On 18 April, the number of confirmed cases increased by 193 reaching 834. There was one more death that brought the tally to nine with 99 recoveries. The number of tested samples is 60,916 out of which 1.37% are positive.
- On 19 April, the number of confirmed cases in Ghana was 1042. It was announced by the president of Ghana in his address to the nation. The partial lock down that had been imposed three weeks earlier was lifted but the other preventive protocols were still in effect.
- On 22 April, the number of confirmed cases stands at 1,154 with 120 recoveries. 122 new cases recorded with 21 patients recovering over a three-day period from the day of the Presidential address.
- On 24 April, 125 new cases are confirmed, bringing the overall figure to 1,279. 134 people have recovered and 10 have died. The Oti and Western North Regions record cases and that brings the tally of regions with confirmed cases to 12. In the Oti Region, there are 13 confirmed cases, while the Western North has one case.
- On 26 April, 271 new cases are confirmed and the total is 1,550. There are 11 deaths, while 21 patients have recovered making total recoveries 155.
- On 28 April, 1,671 cases are confirmed. 16 patients have died and 188 have recovered. Mandatory use of masks is enforced by businesses and organizations.
- On 30 April, 403 new cases are reported, bringing the total to 2,074. The death toll stood at 17 with 212 patients making recoveries. The Savannah, Bono, Ahafo and Bono East Regions did not recorded any cases yet.

=== May 2020 ===
- On 2 May, the number of confirmed cases reached 2,169 after 95 new cases were recorded. One more patient died, bringing the death toll to 18. The number of recoveries was 229, which was an increase of 17.
- On 4 May, the number of confirmed cases reached 2,719 and 294 recoveries, but the death toll remained at 18.
- On 7 May, 372 new cases were confirmed, bringing the total to 3,091. The number of recoveries was 303 and the deaths remained at 18. The Bono Region recorded its first case, bringing the number of regions affected with COVID-19 cases to 13 .
- On 8 May, 921 cases were confirmed, raising the tally to 4,012. The number of recoveries was 323 and the deaths stayed at 18. More than half of the new cases were from an outbreak in an industrial facility.
- On 9 May, 251 new cases were confirmed, increasing the total to 4,263. The total recoveries increased to 378 with four deaths, bringing its tally to 22.
- On 10 May, Ghana's case count increased to 4,700 with 494 recoveries. In a televised address, the president extended the ban on social gatherings till the last day of May 2020.
- On 11 May, the government of Ghana through the office of the Ghana Tourism Authority, gave hotels, bars and restaurants permission to reopen but to operate under enhanced social distancing procedures.
- On 12 May, the number of confirmed cases hit 5,127. An increase of 427. Both the tallies of deaths and recoveries remained at 22 and 494 respectively. 272 out 427 cases which is 63.7% were from Obuasi which emerged as a hotspot for the spread of the virus. The hotspots identified were in the Greater Accra, Ashanti and Central Regions. In Greater Accra, the Tema Metropolitan, Accra Metropolitan, Klottey Korle and Kpong Katamanso districts recorded the highest tallies with Tema taking the top position, followed by the Ablekuma, Okaikwei South and North, Ashiaman and Adenta areas as well as the Ga Central townships. In the Ashanti Region, Obuasi had the highest figures followed by Kumasi, Oforikrom, and Nkawie. Other areas were Old Tafo, Asokwa, Kumasi Municipal, Kumasi Metropolis and Suame which had high numbers as well. Komenda-Edina-Eguafo-Abbrem (KEEA) District, Cape Coast, and Ajumako are the districts with the high numbers in the Central Region.
- On 13 May, the number of confirmed cases was 5,408. Two more deaths were recorded making the count 24 with 514 patients recovering from the disease.
- On 14 May, 122 new cases were confirmed, bringing the total to 5,530. Recoveries increased to 674 and the death toll stayed at 24.
- On 15 May, the number of confirmed recoveries was 1460 and the number of death rose to 28. 786 more recoveries were added to the previous 674 recoveries which rose to 1460. The number of total confirmed cases in Ghana has reached 5,638. According to the Disease Surveillance Dept in Ghana, the country's active cases stood at 4,150. The regions which no confirmed case of COVID-19 are the Savannah, Ahafo and Bono East regions.
- On 16 May, 97 more people tested positive for COVID-19 which brought the total number of affected people to 5,735 in the country. 294 more people recovered from the disease making 1,754 recoveries. One death was also confirmed bringing the total number of deaths to 29.
- On 19 May, the number of confirmed cases in Ghana increased to 6,096. It was indicated by the service that 19 more recovered making 1,773 recoveries from the virus. The number of deaths remained at 31. 695 persons tested positive at a fish-processing factory in Tema after a worker contracted the virus and infected over 500 workers there. These figures arrived after the entire 1,300 staff of the company were tested. It was also disclosed that 95 percent of the affected persons recorded a first negative test.
- On 20 May, it was confirmed 30 health workers tested positive for the virus in Ashanti region during their line of duty. It was confirmed by the regional director of health services. Affected persons were frontline workers managing the disease in the region. 173 new cases were confirmed making Ghana's case move to 6,269 according to Ghana Health Service. 125 more recoveries were made, raising the number of recovered persons to 1,898.
- On 21 May, it was disclosed that ten inmates had tested positive for the virus in the Tema Metropolis. The Tema Regional Police Commander said out of the affected ten persons, nine were from the Ashaiman cells and one was in a cell at Kpone, According to the Ghana Health Service, 187,929 tests were conducted for the virus. 49,661 of the tests were conducted as a result of routine surveillance while 138,268 were through contact tracing. 43 health workers tested positive for the virus in the Western region of Ghana. 20 of them were from the Effia-Nkwanta Regional Hospital in Sekondi-Takoradi and the remaining 23 were from the Tarkwa-Nsuaem Municipality. It was confirmed by the Medical Doctor of the Regional Hospital.
- On 22 May, Ghana's case increased to 6,486 and the number of recoveries were 1,951. There was an increase of 217 new cases. An increase of 53 persons who have recovered from the virus. It was confirmed by the Ghana Health Service. A mining company in Prestea located in the Western region reported 2 cases.
- On 23 May, Ghana's case rose to 6,617 with an increase of 131 new cases. 27 persons where also confirmed to have recovered from after testing double negative. It means the number of recoveries rose to 1,978. It was confirmed by the Ghana Health Service. There was no death reported.
- On 24 May, 20 people were declared to have recovered from the virus. This brought the number of recoveries to 1,998. It was released by the Ghana Health Service. One death was reported, bringing the number of deaths to 32. The Savanna region in Ghana, recorded its first COVID-19 case. The number of affected regions in Ghana is now 14. There was 66 new cases which has pushed the number to 6,683. There was an increase in death reaching 32.
- On 25 May, the Ghana Health Service reported 72 new recoveries bringing the total number of recoveries to 2,070. They were discharged after they tested double negative for the COVID-19 virus. It was confirmed that there was an increase of 125 new cases since the previous confirmed cases to 6,808.
- On 26 May, it was confirmed by the Ghana Health Service that Ghana's case count increased to 6,964. This was said by the director general at the press briefing. There was an increase in recoveries to 2,097. The death toll remained at 32. It was announced by the director general of the Ghana Health Service that Sekondi-Takoradi and Tarkwa all in the Western region are the new hotspots for the COVID-19 infection. According to him, these towns recorded 57 out of the 156 new confirmed cases which shot up the case counts.
- On 27 May, the Ghana Health Service confirmed Ghana's cases increased to 7,117 as 153 new cases were recorded. The number of recoveries rose to 2,317 as 220 people recovered. 2 people died of the virus which brought the death toll to 34. The active cases in Ghana was 4,766. It was later confirmed 186 new cases recorded in Ghana pushed the total count to 7,303. This was confirmed on the website of Ghana Health Service. 95 more persons recovered moving the total number of recoveries to 2,412. Health personnel in Ghana conducted 205,890 tests. It disclosed the number of active cases stood at 4,857. The death toll remained at 34
- On 28 May, Bono East region confirmed its first COVID-19 case. This brought the number of affected regions in Ghana to 15. Head of Public Health of the Ghana Health Service disclosed this at the COVID-19 press briefing. It was also confirmed that 11 inmates in the cells of Ashaiman police tested positive.
- On 29 May, Ghana's case count increased to 7,616. This was confirmed by the Ghana Health Service that 313 new cases were recorded with nine people declared recovered from the virus. About 50 workers at the Jubilee Field operated by Tullow Oil were confirmed to have tested positive for the virus. This was confirmed by the Western Regional Director of Health.
- On 30 May, Ghana's COVID-19 case count increased to 7,768 with 2,540 recoveries. 152 new cases were recorded while 128 people recovered from the disease. This was confirmed by the Ghana Health Service. One person died which brought the death toll to 35. 28 people were traced to the first positive COVID-19 case in the Bono East region of Ghana. This was disclosed by the regional director of health.
- On 31 May, there were 113 new confirmed cases which raised the tally to 7,881. There was one more death, bringing the number of dead to 36 with 2,841 recoveries. The Ahafo region is now the only one without any reported case of the disease. Ghana's COVID-19 case count rose to 8,070 as there were 189 new cases and the number of recoveries increased to 2,947 as 106 persons recovered from the virus. The president Nana Akufo-Addo disclosed this in his address to the nation. He said 218,425 tests were conducted as at 31 May 2020. The death toll still remained at 36. He also stated that the number of active cases in Ghana stood at 5,087

=== June 2020 ===
- On 1 June, the Volta region in Ghana confirmed 40 more COVID-19 cases which increased the regions number from 44 to 84. At first, the number of the cases moved from 44 to 59, then to 71 in the middle of the week and to 84 during the weekend. The number of recoveries in the region increased from 28 to 35 by the weekend. This was confirmed by the Public Health Directorate of the region.
- On 2 June, it was confirmed 227 new cases were recorded pushing Ghana's COVID-19 cases to 8,297. This was confirmed by the Ghana Health Service case management. 2,986 persons recovered. The death toll rose to 38 as 2 patients died. Ghana's active cases were 5,273. 95 persons from a total of 134 patients who tested positive for the virus in the Eastern region recovered from the disease. This was confirmed by the Eastern regional Health Directorate.
- On 3 June, the case count of COVID-19 in Ghana rose to 8,548. 146 persons recovered, which brought the total number of recoveries to 3,132. This was confirmed by the Ghana Health Service. Death toll remained at 38. Active cases in Ghana was 5,378. Researchers at the KCCR warned of possible COVID-19 cases surge after easing of restrictions.
- On 4 June, Ghana's COVID-19 cases increased by 337 which brought the total number of cases to 8,885. This was confirmed by the Ghana Health Service. 57 more people recovered from the disease, which brought the number of recoveries to 3,189. Death toll remained at 38. Ghana's active cases stood at 5,658. Greater Accra region recorded 6,102 cases out of the national overall number of 8,885 cases. 111 health workers in the Central region tested positive for the virus. This was confirmed by the Deputy Regional Health Director.
- On 5 June, Ghana's case rose to 9,168 as 283 new cases were detected. This was confirmed by the Ghana Health Service. 268 persons recovered from the disease which pushed the number of recoveries to 3,457. Ghana's active cases stood at 5,669. 4 more people died from the virus, which increased the death toll to 42.
- On 6 June, there were 294 new confirmed cases that increased the overall count to 9,462. There were 90 recoveries pushing the number of recoveries to 3,547. Two more deaths were recorded, increasing the death count to 44. The number of active cases was 5,871. This was confirmed by the Ghana Health Service.
- On 7 June, Ghana's COVID-19 case count increased to 9,638 as 176 new cases were confirmed by the Ghana Health Service. The death toll remained at 44. The number of recoveries increased to 3,636 as 89 more people recovered from the disease. Ghana's active cases stood at 5,958.
- On 8 June, 272 new cases of COVID-19 in Ghana increased the number of cases to 9,910. The number of recoveries also increased to 3,645. Four more deaths were recorded which increased the death toll to 48. Ghana's active cases stood at 6,217. This was confirmed by the Ghana Health Service.
- On 9 June, 291 new cases were confirmed, which pushed Ghana's case count to 10,201. This was confirmed by the Ghana Health Service. 110 persons also recovered from the virus which increased the number of recoveries to 3,755. Ghana's active case stood at 6,398. Ahafo region recorded its first COVID-19 case which meant all regions in Ghana recorded cases of the disease. The Effutu Municipality recorded 19 cases of COVID-19 disease with one death. This was confirmed by the Health Director of the municipality. 16 persons who died from coronavirus in Accra were buried by the Accra Metropolitan Assembly. This was confirmed by the Head of Environmental Health Department of the AMA. She disclosed 27 families of the 48 persons who died from the disease registered for the burial, 16 bodies were buried.
- Model-based simulations for Ghana indicate that the 95% confidence interval for the time-varying reproduction number R_{t} fluctuated around 1.0 from mid-June to the last week of July.
- On 17 June, a three-month-old baby died from the virus in the Northern region. The Ghana Health Service denied allegations that it is under-reporting the virus death toll of the country. An inmate at Kumasi Central Prison tested positive for the virus and was isolated.
- On 18 June, the director-general of the Ghana Health Service confirmed Ghana has reviewed its COVID-19 discharge policy to ease pressure on health facilities and others. He explained that the review would affect patients who do not show symptoms of the disease and patients whose symptoms die down during treatment. Five members of a media company called the Multimedia Group Limited in Accra, tested positive for the disease.
- On 19 June, the Foods and Drugs Authority cautioned the general public against buying or stocking dexamethasone after news of the drug was heard it helped reduced the number of deaths in COVID-19 patients who were on ventilators and oxygen in the United Kingdom.
- On 21 June, the president in his address to the nation assured the state remained committed to safeguarding teaching staff, non-teaching staff, and students from the COVID-19 disease as schools where partially reopened.
- On 22 June, the GHS explained that the reasons for the new COVID-19 discharge policy was to decongest the country's isolation centers and other reasons.
- On 23 June, the National Hajj Board said it was ready to refund monies collected from potential pilgrims as the 2020 Hajj looked grim. This was because Saudi Arabia refused to accept persons outside the country due to COVID-19 restrictions.
- On 24 June, Ghana recorded 445 new cases of the virus. This was confirmed on the GHS website. 171 persons also recovered from the virus. The Ghana Association of Medical Laboratory Scientists called for the establishment of more COVID-19 testing centers with more enhanced equipment. Tobinco Group of Companies produced Hydroxychloroquine, a drug for managing COVID-19 cases which has been endorsed by WHO.
- On 25 June, Ashanti region recorded 205 new cases with 3 deaths in 24 hours. Over 21million Ghana cedis was distributed to institutions from the National COVID-19 Trust fund. The Governor of the BoG said the impact of COVID-19 on Ghana's economy would be significant for the year 2020 as the disease was a global one. A mining company donated hygiene products to some schools to help keep the teachers and students safe from the coronavirus in the Amansie West and South districts in the Ashanti region.
- On 26 June, the CEO of the Chamber of Bulk Oil Distributors said for the continent of Africa to be self-reliant, African leaders have to pay attention to the lessons from COVID-19. He spoke it at the virtual Africa Summit 2020 during a panel session. An NGO donated PPE to the residents of Wassa Agona Amenfi to help in protecting against COVID-19.
- On 27 June, the first series of flights that took medical supplies to Africa to help in the fight against COVID-19 pandemic took off the United Kingdom. UNDP supported Korle-Bu Hospital to locally produce hand sanitizers to reduce COVID-19 infections in Ghana.
- On 28 June, the president also extended incentive package for health workers for three months as they led Ghana's fight against COVID-19 pandemic. The president disclosed 83% of critically ill persons with the coronavirus have fully recovered.
- On 29 June, an investigative journalist showed a documentary where he exposed quack doctors in Ghana selling locally manufactured drugs portrayed as having potency to cure COVID-19 disease.
- On 30 June, the Head of Management Department of UCC Business School called for companies to show care to their employees, stakeholders and communities. 2 people were arrested for allegedly manufacturing local medicines portraying it cures COVID-19 disease.

=== July 2020 ===
- On 1 July, the former general secretary of the GMA advocated for the inclusion of private health facilities in the testing of coronavirus disease samples in Ghana. The Deputy Minister for Health justified government's decision to follow the WHO recommendation to discharge persons with the coronavirus disease.
- On 2 July, the minority in parliament called on government to ensure the EC complies with COVID-19 protocols. A former president of Ghana said in a tweet that "it does not appear that we can afford the comfort of thinking the COVID-19 virus has gone weak or lessened its grip. It is there and very much around waiting to infect and claim the lives of those of us who will underestimate its danger."
- On 3 July, FDA cautioned the public against the use of unauthorized COVID-19 tests kits.
- On 4 July, actors in Ghana claimed COVID-19 affected them as productions of movies and shows was halted. COVID-19 pandemic 'inspired' locally produced wax cloth hit the markets in Ghana with names such as 'Fellow Ghanaians', 'Lockdown', 'Stay at home', and 'No flights'.
- On 5 July, the GMA disclosed that more than 150 health personnel tested positive for COVID-19 since the outbreak of the disease was announced in Ghana. Health professionals in Ghana wrote to the EC to pause the voter registration exercise to prevent more COVID-19 deaths.
- On 6 July, BOST temporarily shut down after 46 persons tested positive for the virus. They tested positive after a mass testing of staff was conducted. One student of Wesley SHS tested positive for the virus in Konongo.
- On 7 July, COCOBOD closed down their offices temporarily after it was reported some workers tested positive of COVID-19. Some 648 contacts were identified after they were exposed to persons with the COVID-19 disease at Accra Girls School. Catholic Bishops called for more security personnel to enforce COVID-19 disease protocols at the various voter's registration centers. Worker at GRIDCo office in Tema tested positive for the virus.
- On 8 July, Chief Justice in Ghana went for a 14-day self-isolation after he was advised by his doctors. Nine students in Mpraeso SHS went in isolation after they were suspected of the virus.
- On 9 July, the Minority in the parliament called for the closure of schools across the country as a means to end the spread of COVID-19 among students and staffs. Minister of Education claimed most people at the Ministry tested positive for COVID-19.
- On 10 July, the NAS responded to 2,797 emergency cases of COVID-19 across the country since 12 March. A group donated an amount of GH¢100,000 to support the fight against coronavirus. A group also donated 10,000 pieces of face masks to the Police Administration to help in the fight of COVID-19 pandemic. GNAT expected mass testing in schools that recorded cases of COVID-19.
- On 11 July, the Ghana COVID-19 Fund donated food items to two institutions which seemed to be neglected during the pandemic. It was confirmed by the Western Regional Director of Health that five schools in the Western region recorded COVID-19.
- On 12 July, the Head office of BOST was reported to have been fumigated and disinfected after COVID-19 was recorded at the facility. The Minister of Regional Reorganization and Development was discharged from UGMC after he contracted the virus.
- On 13 July, 38 FDA staff recovered from COVID-19 after they tested positive for the virus. The Ministry of Fisheries and Aquaculture Development called off the 2020 close fishing season due to the onset of COVID-19 pandemic. The Council of PTAs called for the closure of schools and the postponement of the final year exams because of COVID-19.
- On 14 July, the GHS issued a warning regarding the usage of face shield without face masks. Both are to be used and not as an alternative. An individual donated a machine to the UGMC to support the hospital and the fight against COVID-19. A mobile app was introduced for health care providers which offers practical support for the handling of COVID-19 disease. The Deputy Minister for Health claimed closing down schools because of reported cases of COVID-19 in some institutions was not advisable.
- On 15 July, the Deputy Minister for Health clarified the statement he made concerning the shutting down of schools over COVID-19 infections.
- On 16 July, the Deputy Minister for Education clarified the need for the final year exams to proceed despite COVID-19 concerns. The director-general of GHS said the country's COVID-19 figures trended in the right direction.
- On 17 July, an Accra High Court adjourned a trial to enable the counsel produce medical evidence of isolation as he claimed to have been exposed to COVID-19.
- On 18 July, the NHIA received 3,000 face masks from a company in Ghana in the fight against COVID-19. The Western Regional Testing Center for the virus run out of testing logistics and reagents.
- On 19 July, the director of health promotion at GHS claimed there is hope for Ghana to overcome COVID-19 soon if Ghanaians adhere to the safety protocols. The 2020 John Atta Mills commemorative lecture was called off due to COVID-19 and its related restrictions on public gathering.
- On 20 July, the president gave an order for the second phase of nationwide disinfection exercise to limit the spread of COVID-19 in Ghana. The Embassy of Netherlands in Accra donated PPE's to an organization for COVID-19 response. It was reported the Upper regions in Ghana had no active cases of COVID-19.
- On 21 July, the director-general of GHS said persons who show symptoms of the virus would be prioritise when they report to a health facility for testing. He also claimed Ghana's COVID-19 active cases were 82 percent asymptomatic. The flagbearer of NDC suspended his tour of registration centers because of very low awareness of COVID-19 protocols.
- On 22 July, the president claimed he was not flown to the UK for COVID-19 treatment during his 14-day self-isolation.
- On 23 July, an NGO provided some female porters with relief items and some soaps, sanitizers and nose masks to prevent the spread of COVID-19. The Local Government Ministry were commended by the Bono Regional minister for the second phase disinfection and fumigation of places across Ghana. The former Finance Minister told Government not to blame Ghana's economy struggles on only COVID-19. The Chinese Embassy in Ghana on behalf of the First Lady of China donated PPE's and other medical supplies to the First Lady of Ghana to help in the fight against the pandemic.
- On 24 July, the vice-president commissioned the Ghana Infectious Disease Centre, a 100-bed facility built to help the National COVID-19 Treatment Center.
- Model-based simulations for Ghana indicate that the 95% confidence interval for the time-varying reproduction number R_{t} was close to 1.0 until the last week of July, when it dropped below 1.
- On 25 July, the North East Regional Minister claimed the ongoing mass dis-infections of places have been useful and has controlled the spread of the virus.
- On 26 July, the GWCL announced that the free water extended by the government had already began. The president addressed Ghanaians in the fight against COVID-19. The AGI called for the addition of large companies in government's stimulus package of COVID-19 for businesses.
- On 27 July, the government claimed the implementation of the new rate of Talk Tax was to begin in September. An NGO donated PPEs to a community in the fight against COVID-19. A not-for-profit organization selected about 8,000 MSMEs in Ghana, Kenya and Senegal to benefit from $1.69 million package to help them navigate problems created by COVID-19.
- On 28 July, the GHS claimed there was a reduction in the active COVID-19 cases in Ghana. Transport fares were reduced by 10 percent after operators were allowed to take full capacity. Flights to the Wa airport were suspended over low patronage and COVID-19 pandemic.
- On 29 July, the FDA claimed none of the 34 RDT kits that were submitted met the testing requirement for COVID-19 RDT. A lecturer of UDS urged Government to reopen schools in low risk areas.
- On 30 July, the GHS claimed it was expending COVID-19 testings to hospitals across Ghana. A report from GSS revealed about 22 million Ghanaians had reduced incomes since the pandemic hit Ghana in March 2020. Muslims were advised to avoid holding congregational prayers due to COVID-19. NCCE in the ASEm embarked on COVID-19 sensitization exercise in public places. The municipal chief executive of New Juaben South appealed to Ghanaians to help the government's efforts to fight COVID-19.
- On 31 July, some organizations claimed not many women were given opportunities at decision-making levels in the fight against coronavirus in West Africa.
