= William Kwasi Sabi =

Ghanaian politician (born 1966)

Member of the Ghana Parliament for Dormaa East Constituency

Personal details
- Born: 23 August 1966 (age 60)
- Party: New Patriotic Party
- Education: University of Ghana Legon; University of Cape Town

William Kwasi Sabi (born 23 August 1966) is a Ghanaian politician and member of the Seventh Parliament of the Fourth Republic of Ghana representing the Dormaa East Constituency in the Bono Region on the ticket of the New Patriotic Party (NPP).

== Early life and education ==
Sabi was born on 23 August 1966. He hails from Wamfie in the Bono Region of Ghana. He holds a Bachelor of Science degree in Administration from the University of Ghana Legon and a Master's in Public Health from the University of Cape Town.

== Career ==
Sabi began his career as a hospital administrator at the Catholic Health Service, Sunyani from 1997 to 2003. He worked as a lecturer at the Catholic University College of Ghana from 2005 to 2009. In 2008, he became the operations manager for National Health Insurance Authority. He later worked as a management consultant with MDF West Africa Limited.

== Politics ==
Sabi is a member of the New Patriotic Party and represented the Dormaa East Constituency in the Bono Region in the Sixth and Seventh Parliament of the Fourth Republic of Ghana.

=== 2012 election ===
Sabi contested for the seat of the Dormaa East constituency on the ticket of the New Patriotic Party in the 2012 Ghanaian general election and won. He garnered 13,712 votes which represent 56.87% of the total votes cast and therefore defeated the other contestants including Ali Adjei Ibrahim, Felix Kumi Kwaku, Asante Oppong Alexander, and Adoma Hayford. He served as the Deputy Minister for the Ministry of Monitoring and Evaluation from 2016 to 2020, and currently, he is the Technical Advisor at the Monitoring and Evaluation Secretariat, Office of the President.

==== 2016 election ====
Sabi contested the Dormaa East constituency parliamentary seat on the ticket of the New Patriotic Party during the 2016 Ghanaian general election and won with 14,637 votes representing 62.36% of the total votes. He was elected over Frank Kumi of the National Democratic Congress who polled 8,490 votes which is equivalent to 36.18%, parliamentary candidate for the PPP Ameyaw Frank had 276 votes and parliamentary candidate for the Convention People's Party Osei Bismark had 65 votes representing 0.28% of the total votes.

===== New Patriotic Party 2020 primaries =====
During the 2020 New Patriotic Party primaries, Sabi lost the election to Paul Apreku Twum-Barimah.

== Personal life ==
Sabi is a Christian. He is married with one child.
