= John Kwame Adu Jack =

Ghanaian politician

Hon. John Kwame Adu Jack MP

Member of Parliament for Dormaa Central
- Incumbent
- Assumed office 7 January 2025
- Preceded by: Kwaku Agyemang-Manu
- President: John Mahama
- Vice President: Jane Naana Opoku-Agyemang

Personal details
- Born: 16 September 1967 (age 59)
- Party: National Democratic Congress (Ghana)
- Occupation: Politician
- Committees: Youth and Sports; Ethics and Standards

John Kwame Adu Jack is a Ghanaian politician and a member of the National Democratic Congress. He is from Dormaa Antwirifo and represents Dormaa Central Constituency of the Bono Region in the 9th Parliament of the 4th republic of Ghana.

== Early life and education ==
Adu Jack was born on 16 September 1967. He is from Dormaa Antwirifo in the Bono Region of Ghana. He attended Sunyani Technical Institute, where he obtained a City & Guilds qualification in Motor Vehicle Mechanics in September 1987. He later completed the Senior Secondary School Certificate Examination (SSSCE) as a private candidate in December 2005.

He obtained a Bachelor of Science in Business Administration from the Kwame Nkrumah University of Science and Technology (KNUST) in June 2010. He subsequently obtained a Master of Business Administration in Finance from KNUST in November 2013 and a Master of Philosophy in Business Administration from the same institution in November 2019. He also obtained a Custom House Agent Proficiency Certificate from the Customs Division of the Ghana Revenue Authority in February 2000.

== Career ==
Adu Jack has worked in academia and the private sector. He served as a Teaching Assistant at the KNUST School of Business and later worked as a Lecturer at KAAF University.

In the private sector, he served as Director of Blessed Yako Ltd and as Chief Executive Officer of JAKY Freight & Logistics Ltd. At KAAF University, he also served as Head of the Department of Accounting, Banking and Finance.

== Personal life ==
Adu Jack is a Christian and is from Dormaa Antwirifo in the Bono Region of Ghana. He is a member of the National Democratic Congress (NDC).
