= Paul Apreku Twum Barimah =

Ghanaian politician

Hon. Paul Apreku Twum Barimah
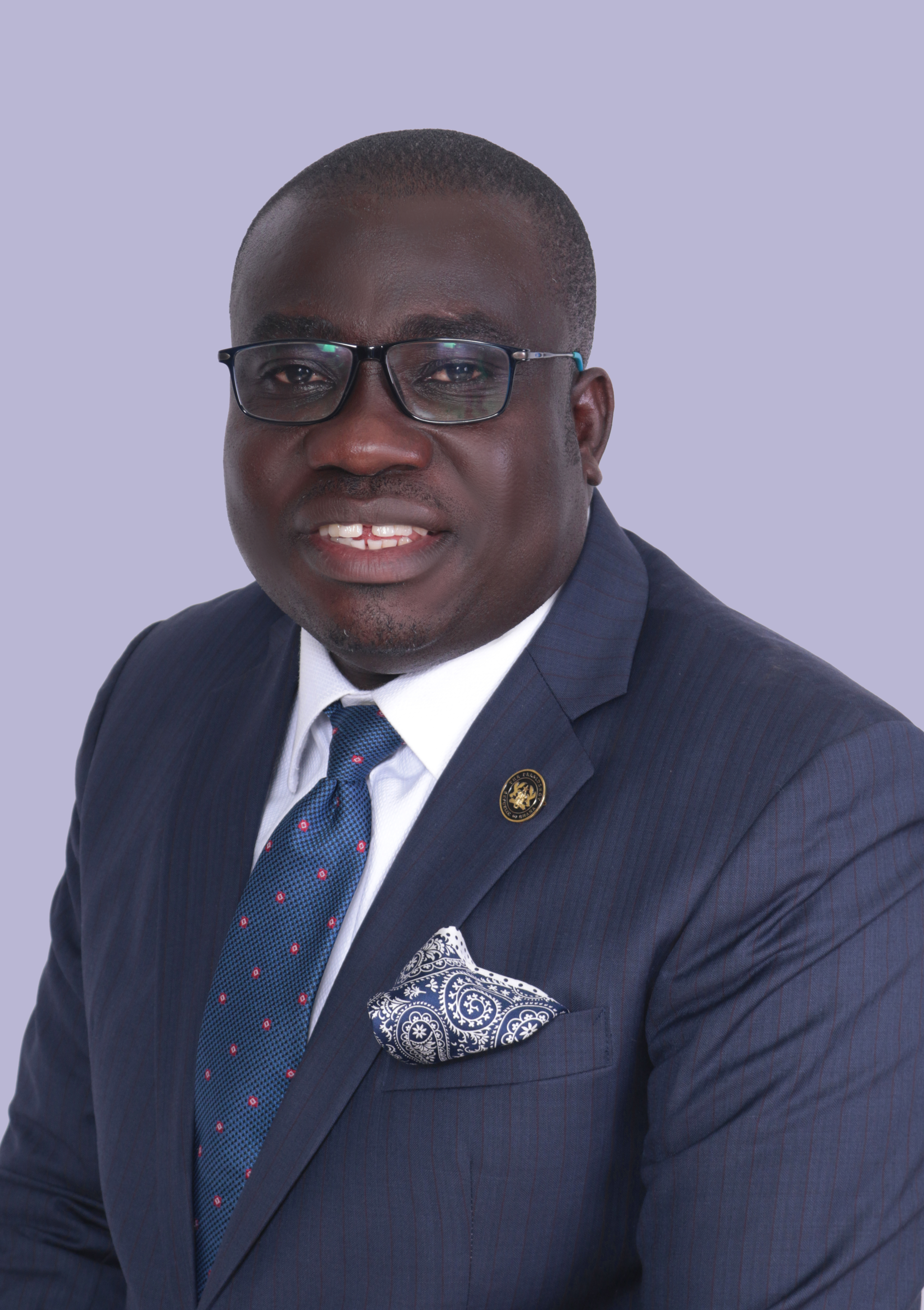

Member of Parliament for Dormaa East Constituency
- Incumbent
- Assumed office 7 January 2021
- Preceded by: Kwaku Agyemang-Manu
- Succeeded by: Rachel Amma Owusuah

Personal details
- Born: Paul Apreku Twum Barimah; 23 May 1982 (age 44) Kobedia-Asupra, Ghana
- Party: New Patriotic Party
- Occupation: Politician
- Committees: Special Budget Committee, Poverty Reduction Strategy Committee, Foreign Affairs Committee

Paul Apreku Twum-Barimah is a Ghanaian politician and member of parliament for the Dormaa East constituency in the Bono region of Ghana .

== Early life and education ==
Barimah was born on 23 May 1982 and hails from Kobedia-Asupra in the Bono region of Ghana. He had his SSSCE in 2000. He is lawyer, had his bachelor's degree in Sociology & Information Studies in Social Science in 2006. He further had his MSc in Communications and Public Affairs in 2012. He had his LLB in General Law in 2018. He also had his certificate in Oil, Gas & Petroleum Management in 2020.

== Career ==
Barimah was the Head of Event and Production at Radio Universe. He was also the Station Manager at RGU radio. He was the Media manager at EXP Ghana. He was also the Assistant Communication Officer at the British High Commission. He was also the Corporate Affairs and Sustainability Manager for Zen Petroleum. He was also the Development Communication Coordinator for SADA. He was also the Government Relations and Regulatory Affairs for ENI Ghana Exploration & Production Limited.

=== Political career ===
He is a member of NPP and currently the MP for Dormaa East Constituency. He won the parliamentary seat with 16,679 votes whilst the NDC aspirant Racheal Owusuah had 11,383 votes. He was adjudged as the best first term member of Parliament in the year 2022.he was recognize by Watch Parliament and Civil Societies based on his in-depth research and analysis works, Contributions at committee meetings, Valuable contributions in the floor of Parliament and many more.

=== Committees ===
He is a member of the Special Budget Committee, a member of the Foreign Affairs Committee, Privileges Committee, Roads and Transport Committee, Mines and Energy committee and also a member of the Poverty Reduction Strategy Committee.

== Personal life ==
Barimah is a Christian.

== Philanthropy ==
In December 2021, he donated food and other assorted items to about 200 widows in the Dormaa East constituency. He also gave hospital beds and medical equipment to the Wamfie District Hospital. He also donated working equipment and tools to about 400 apprentices and workers in Wamanafo and Wamfie.
