= Dormaa Central (Ghana parliament constituency) =

Constituency in the Bono Region of Ghana

- constituency for the Parliament of Ghana
- District: Dormaa Municipal District
- Region: Bono Region of Ghana

Current constituency
- Created: 2012
- Party: National Democratic Congress
- MP: John Kwame Adu Jack

Dormaa Central is one of the constituencies represented in the Parliament of Ghana. It elects one Member of Parliament (MP) by the first past the post system of election. John Kwame Adu Jack is the member of parliament for the constituency. Dormaa Central is located in the Dormaa Municipal District of the Bono Region of Ghana. It was created prior to the 2012 Ghanaian general election.

== Boundaries ==
The seat is located within the Dormaa Municipal District of the Bono Region of Ghana.

== Members of Parliament ==
First elected	Member	Party
Created 2012
2012	Kwaku Agyemang-Manu	New Patriotic Party
2024	John Kwame Adu Jack	National Democratic Congress

== Elections ==
2024: Dormaa Central
Party	Candidate	Votes	%	±%
NDC	John Kwame Adu Jack	23,035	56.59	+15.87
NPP	Kwaku Agyemang-Manu	17,450	42.87	−15.00
Great Consolidated Popular Party	Joechee Uroy Edem	125	0.31	—
NDP	Eric Kwaku Yeboah	97	0.24	—
Majority		5,585	+13.72	−3.43
Turnout		41,117	—	—
Registered electors		—		—

2020 Ghanaian general election: Dorma Central
Party	Candidate	Votes	%	±%
New Patriotic Party	Kwaku Agyemang-Manu	28,540	57.87	
National Democratic Congress	Gordon Asubonten	20,085	40.72	
Ghana Union Movement	Angelah Twumasi Yeboah	597	1.21	
Great Consolidated Popular Party	Ederm Dokyi	52	0.11	
People's National Convention	Kwame Oteng Adjei	46	0.09	
Majority		8,455	17.15	
Turnout				
Registered electors				

2016 Ghanaian general election: Dormaa Central Source : Peacefmonline
Party	Candidate	Votes	%
NPP	Kwaku Agyemang-manu	22,277	53.08
NDC	John Kwame Adu Jack	19,372	46.16
CPP	Kumah Yeboah Asuamah	181	0.43
PPP	Samuel Kofi Okrah	87	0.21
PNC	Oteng Adjei Kwame	52	0.12

2012 Ghanaian general election : Dormaa Central Source : Peacefmonline
Party	Candidate	Votes	%
NPP	Kwaku Agyemang-Manu	22,631	49.37
NDC	Kwame Agyenim-Boateng	22,630	49.36
PPP	Amponsah Kumi	276	0.60
CPP	Yeboah Alexander	239	0.52
NDP	Appiah-Adjei Boateng	61	0.13

Results below are prior to the creation of the Dorma Central Constituency. For the 1965 elections, there were the Dorma and the Dorma-Drobo constituencies. For the 1969 and 1979 elections, there was a single Dorma constituency. Between 1992 and 2008 elections, there was the Dorma West and Dorma East constituencies. The Dorma Central constituency was created before the 2012 elections.

== See also ==
- List of Ghana Parliament constituencies
- List of political parties in Ghana
