= Rachel Amma Owusuah =

Ghanaian politician

Hon. Rachel Amma Owusuah MP

Member of Parliament for Dormaa East
- Incumbent
- Assumed office 7 January 2025
- Preceded by: Paul Apreku Twum Barimah

Personal details
- Party: National Democratic Congress

Rachel Amma Owusuah is a Ghanaian politician who is a member of the National Democratic Congress (NDC). She is the member of parliament elect for the Dormaa East constituency.

== Early life and education ==
Owusuah was born on 4 February 1956. She is from Seikwa in the Bono Region of Ghana. She attended the Holy Family Nurses and Midwives Training College in Berekum, where she obtained a certificate in November 1992.

== Career ==
Owusuah is an entrepreneur and healthcare professional. She is the Chief Executive Officer of Rachel Health Centre and A5 Farms.

== Politics ==
In August 2019, she stood for the National Democratic Congress primaries for Dormaa East. Owusuah defeated Seth Kwaku Anorson garnering 377 votes against 286 for his 286 votes.

In 2024 General Elections Owusuah stood in Dormaa East Constituency against the incumbent Paul Apreku Twum Barimah the New Patriotic Party candidate, receiving 12,310 votes (50.53%) defeating her opponent who obtained 12,050 votes (49.47%).

== Personal life ==
Owusuah is a Christian and is from Seikwa in the Bono Region of Ghana. She is a member of the National Democratic Congress (NDC).
