= Jacob Plange-Rhule =

Ghanaian physician (1957–2020)

Jacob Plange-Rhule FRCP, FWACP, FGCP
- Born: 27 July 1957; Winneba, Central Region, Ghana
- Died: 10 April 2020 (aged 62); Accra, Ghana
- Education: Kwame Nkrumah University of Science and Technology; Victoria University of Manchester
- Occupations: Physician, academic
- Spouse: Gyikua Plange-Rhule

Jacob Plange-Rhule (27 July 1957 – 10 April 2020) was a Ghanaian physician, academic, and Rector of the Ghana College of Physicians and Surgeons from October 2015 until his death in 2020.

At the time of his death, Plange-Rhule was a professor and Head of the Department of Physiology of the School of Medical Sciences in Kumasi, Ghana. He was also a consulting physician at the Department of Medicine of the Komfo Anokye Teaching Hospital (KATH) in Kumasi, where he founded the Hypertension and Renal Clinic and headed it for more than two decades.

== Biography ==
Plange-Rhule was born on 27 July 1957, in Winneba, Central Region, Ghana. He had his secondary education at the Accra Academy where he obtained his Ordinary-level certificate in 1976 and his Advanced-level certificate in 1978 prior to entering the Kwame Nkrumah University of Science and Technology. He graduated with a Bachelor of Medicine, Bachelor of Surgery (MB ChB) from the School of Medical Sciences at Kwame Nkrumah University of Science and Technology in 1984. Plange-Rhule then completed a doctorate in renal physiology from the former Victoria University of Manchester (now known as the University of Manchester) in 1991.

In addition to serving as Rector of the Ghana College of Physicians and Surgeons from 2015 to 2020, Plange-Rhule was a former President of both the Ghana Medical Association (GMA) and the Ghana Kidney Association.

Professor Jacob Plange-Rhule died from a short illness with COVID-19 at the University of Ghana Medical Centre in Accra on 10 April 2020, at the age of 62. He was survived by his wife, Gyikua, a pediatrician, and three children. He was laid to rest on Saturday 23 May 2020 at Gethsemane Memorial Gardens after a private funeral service.
