= Ghana Private Road Transport Union =

Ghanaian trade union

The Ghana Private Road Transport Union (GPRTU) is a trade union representing commercial drivers, porters, guards and commercial vehicle owners in Ghana.

The union has branches in all the 16 regions of Ghana and is a member of the Ghana Trades Union Congress. It was founded on 19 May 1967 in Accra.

As the union represents both employees and business owners, it does not engage in collective negotiation. However, it plays an important role in regulating working conditions, and gives financial assistance to members in need. Its membership grew from 30,000 in 2005, to 120,000 in 2011.
