= Greater Accra Regional Hospital =

Regional hospital in Accra, Ghana

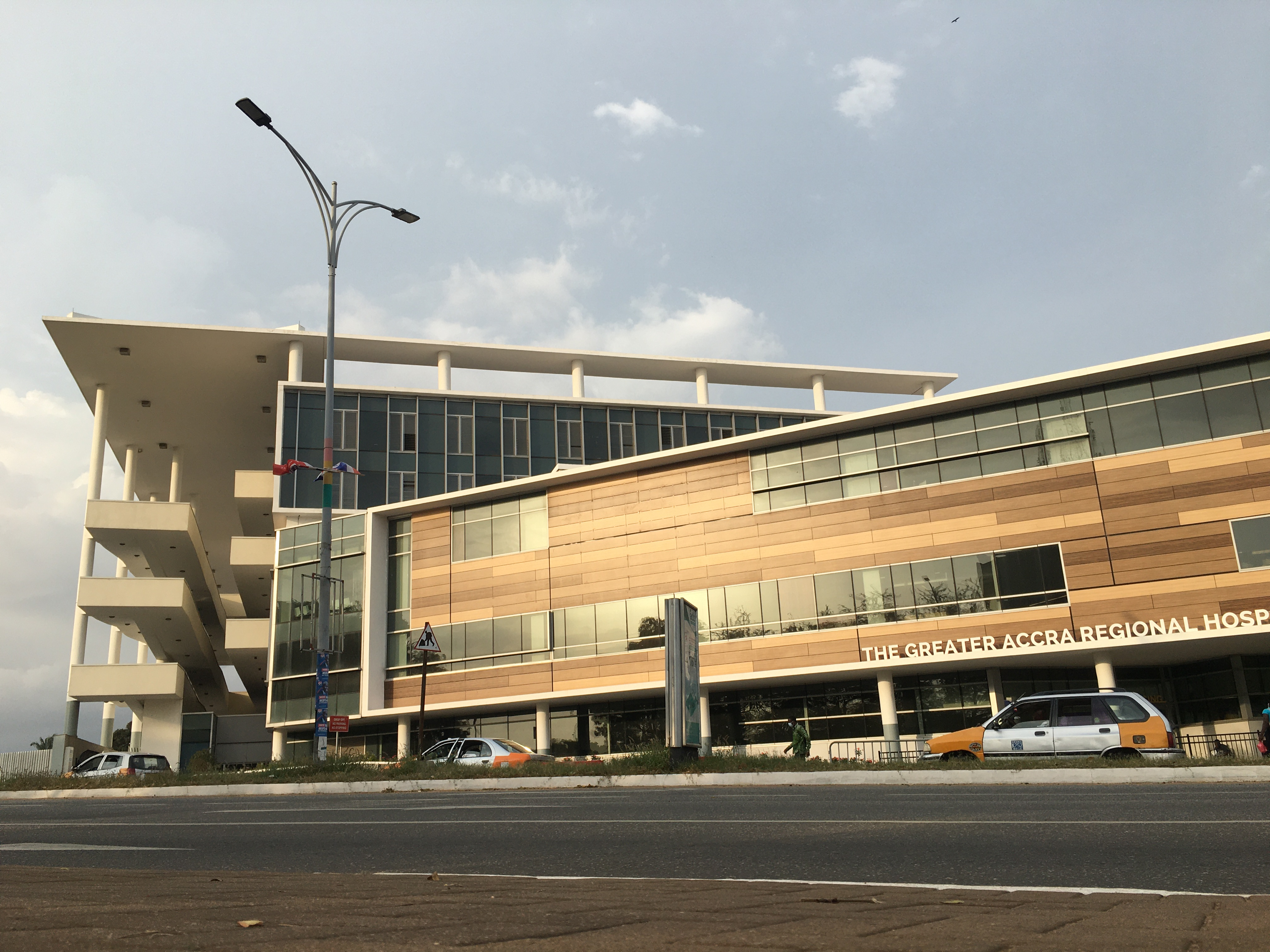
- The modern facility was designed by Perkins and Will

Geography
- Location: Accra, Greater Accra, Ghana
- Coordinates: 5.561618°N 0.198676°W

Services
- Beds: 191

History
- Former name: Ridge Hospital
- Constructed: 2017

Links
- Lists: Hospitals in Ghana

The Greater Accra Regional Hospital (GARH), formerly the Ridge Hospital, is a major regional hospital located in Accra, Ghana.

History and background

Located in the heart of Accra city, the GARH started as a hospital for European expatriates in the Gold Coast around 1928. It became a District Hospital after Ghana's independence in 1957, was designated as Ridge Regional Hospital in 1997, and has now been redeveloped and transformed into a 420-bed capacity hospital.

== Donation ==
The Chinese embassy in Accra presented quantities of medical supplies to the Greater Accra Regional Hospital, to show concern in lieu of corporate social responsibility.

A pharmaceutical company headquartered in Nice, France, Hoefman Laboratories, made several essential donations to boost the antenatal unit of the Regional hospital. These donations included essential medical equipments and nutritional supplements.

== Medical Directors ==
- 2016 to 2017

Dr Thomas Anaba served for one year as the MD and was later transferred to the University for Development Studies where he had served as a permanent lecturer before assuming his new role at Greater Accra Regional Hospital. Dr. Thomas Anaba was alleged to have campaigned for the National Democratic Congress in the Garu Tempane constituency in the Upper East Region during the 2016 general elections. However, he denied ever engaging in such act.

- 2017 till present

Dr. Emmanuel Kwabla Srofenyoh resumed operation and by Monday, 22 May 2017, he started to deploy his staff into the facility then began receiving new patients into the facility.

== Development ==
- The Greater Accra Regional Hospital underwent a 250 million-dollar rehabilitation and development, amid controversies from the then opposition New Patriotic Party who claim the cost of the project is inflated.
- The Greater Accra Regional Hospital has established a stem cell treatment facility, to cater for chronic diseases and endemics. The Centre, which is the first stem cell facility in Ghana, has an innovative technology to cure diseases such as chronic kidney diseases, stroke with neurological deficit and chronic liver diseases.
