= Tema General Hospital =

Ghanaian Hospital

Geography
- Location: Tema, Greater Accra, Ghana

Services
- Emergency department: Yes

Tema General Hospital is a Ghanaian hospital located in Tema. Tema General Hospital is specifically located at the Tema Metropolitan district.

== History ==
In 1954, the Tema General Hospital was constructed to provide health services for workers who constructed the Tema Harbour. It was later handed over to the government for public use. It serves the communities of Nungua, Sakumono, Tema and Dangme West.

== Services ==
- The hospital provide services like internal medicine, general surgery, pediatrics, theatre, obstetrics, gynecological, accident and emergency service.
- The hospital also specializes in eye, dental, diabetic, sickle cell, and dermatology clinics with others being anaesthetic, chest, hypertensive.
- The hospital also supports services such as laboratory, blood bank, radiology, ultrasound scan, pharmacy and physiotherapy. They also accept National Health Insurance Scheme (NHIS).

== Donation ==
An ambulance and some medical equipments were distributed by HOGFE Foundation to the Tema General hospital in Accra, Ghana.

Medical equipments include 27 hospital beds, three baby beds, three mother/baby beds, one emergency unit bed, 400 op.Suction, extraction units and 27 bedside cabinets.

Ricker company limited distributed medical consumables including face masks, surgical gowns, disposal coveralls and temperature gowns to provide an efficient delivery of health services at the Tema General Hospital in Ghana.
