= Kumasi Centre for Collaborative Research in Tropical Medicine =

Research center in Kumasi, Ghana

- Established: 1997
- Scientific Director: Prof. Richard Odame Philips since 2018
- Key people: Jutta Hesse (Head of Administration); Prof. Dr. Kaveh Mashayekhi (Head of Laboratories)
- Location: Kwame Nkrumah University of Science and Technology, Kumasi, Ashanti Region, Ghana
- Coordinates: 6.66977°N 1.57647°W
- Interactive map of Kumasi Centre for Collaborative Research in Tropical Medicine
- Website: www.kccr-ghana.org

Kumasi Centre for Collaborative Research in Tropical Medicine (KCCR) is a Biomedical research institute located at the Kwame Nkrumah University of Science and Technology in Kumasi, Ghana. It is a joint venture between the Ministry of Health (MoH) and the Bernhard Nocht Institute for Tropical Medicine in Hamburg, Germany. It was founded in 1998 and has about 250-300 workers. The centre's objective is to develop a series of world research programs through the acquisition of research grants. The center also tests and confirms samples for COVID-19 pandemic in Ghana.

The facility was made one of the many others in Ghana certified to undertake COVID-19 tests in the country.

== History ==
KCCR is an international platform for biomedical research and a nonprofit research centre in Ghana and globally. It is based on the campus of KNUST in Kumasi in the Ashanti region in the country. It has close cooperation with the Medical School and other related facilities making it develop into a research centre of the College of Health Sciences.

== Supports ==
StanChart Bank supported the KCCR with PCR to expand testing capabilities for the fight against Coronavirus. The Chamber of Bulk Oil Distributors also supported the centre with GH¢100,000.

Competitive international research funds are achieved through competitive international research grant. In April 2020, the German government made a rapid -response grant of EUR 650000 to strengthen COVID‑19 testing capacity and to secure laboratory consumables. Examination of the health research body in Ghana reveals that KCCR mainly relies on external sources to fund its activities with the little direct input being realised through the local government. The centre places focus on strategic procurement of grants available through agencies like EDCTP, WHO and other international health agencies to maintain its research programmes.

== Facilities and Infrastructure ==
KCCR laboratory facility has biosafety level 2 and level 3 facilities, insectarium facility, cold storage, and the ultramodern diagnostic and sequencing units. Its molecular biology laboratory is divided in: extraction, PCR-prep and amplification rooms where there are five real time cyclers, two thermocyclers and a Sanger sequencer, two Illumina® iSeq100, one Illumina® Miniseq. The post-amplification steps are performed in a different room with both electrophoresis and nucleic acid visualization areas, and working with high-pathogens is done in BSL2 + conditions.

This lab has biosafety cabinet, incubators, microscope, a BACTEC blood-culture system, a VITEK 2 Compact instrument that checks the microbial identification and test susceptibility. Flow cytometry, ELISA and immunofluorescence microscopy and primary cell culture sit in an immunology wing. Entomology unit has a restricted access mosquito-breeding-station and Plasmodium culture facilities, parasitology laboratory and offers microscopy based screening of helminthoped and protozoan. There are 24 deep and ultra-low-temperature freezers, two -152 o C freezers and liquid nitrogen tanks and 24h of power redundancy in cryopreservation services.

In addition to the laboratory capacity, KCCR maintains a full data-management team, which directs data collection, storage, analyses and statistical software training. Regular short courses and workshops help guarantee a high level of data governance and methodological support of every research project.
