= Ghana Water Limited =

Water utility company in Ghana

- Formerly: Ghana Water Company Limited
- Type: State-owned
- Industry: Water Utility Services
- Founded: 1993
- Headquarters: Accra, Ghana
- Area served: Urban areas in Ghana
- Products: Water Treatment, Water Supply, Bottle and Sachet Water
- Website: https://www.gwcl.com.gh/

Ghana Water Limited (GWL) (formerly Ghana Water Company Limited, and previously known as Ghana Water and Sewerage Corporation, Aqua Vitens, and Rand Limited) is the sole government-owned water utility company in Ghana. It is responsible for the production, transmission, and distribution of potable water in urban areas across the country.

As of June 2024, GWL manages and operates 84 water supply systems, comprising 61 surface water systems and 23 groundwater systems, serving an estimated 14 million people nationwide. The company maintains 15 regional offices and 103 district offices.

On average, GWL produces 950,995 m^{3} (251,226,000 US gal) of water per day against a national demand of 1,129,361 m^{3} (298,346,000 US gal) gallons per day. Urban water supply coverage stands at 84.2%, serving 1,008,301 customers, of which 89% are metered. The company employs a total staff strength of 5755.

== History ==
Before colonial rule, communities in what is now Ghana relied on natural sources such as streams, rivers, and lakes for water. The first organized public water supply system was developed in the gold coast by the British before world war I. During the 1920s, water systems were extended to other towns and cities, including Winneba, Kumasi, and Cape Coast, then the colonial capital.

Ghana Water Limited was officially established on 1 July 1999 after the Ghana Water and Sewerage corporation was converted into a state-owned limited liability company under the statutory corporations (conversion to companies) act 461 of 1993, as amended by LI 1648.

== Governance structure ==
The Ministry of Sanitation and Water Resources is responsible for formulating national water supply policies, supervising the operations of Ghana Water Limited (GWL), mobilizing funding from external support agencies, and coordinating sector investment plans.

Under the Ministry’s oversight, GWL is governed by an eleven-member Board of Directors, which provides overall policy direction and corporate control. The day-to-day management of the company is entrusted to a Managing Director, supported by three General Managers: one responsible for Finance and Administration, one for Operations, and one for Special Duties (focused on arrears reduction).

These executives are further assisted by sixteen Chief Managers who head the following departments at the Head Office: Project Planning and Development, Human Resources and Administrative Services, Legal Services, Public Relations, Corporate Planning, Monitoring and Evaluation, Technology and Innovation, Finance, Materials, Commercial and Marketing, Audit, Water Quality Assurance/Water Resources, Special Duties, Low-Income Consumer Support (LICSD), Operations and Maintenance, G-Water Bottling Plant, and Lands and Estates.

At the regional level, fifteen Regional Chief Managers oversee operations in their respective regions, supported by Unit Heads (Line Managers). At the district level, District Managers are responsible for supervising and directing GWL’s activities across the country.

== Responsibilities and Duties ==
- Abstraction, treatment and supply of water to urban communities in Ghana
- Urban water sector planning and development
- Investment planning
- Sector financial management
- Assests management
- Contracting out the design, construction, rehabilitation and expansion of existing as well as new water supply infrastructure

== Departments ==
- Technology and Innovation
- Water Quality Assurance/Water Resources
- Commercial
- Human Resource and Administrative Service
- Cooperate Planning, Monitoring and Evaluation
- Project Planning and Development
- Special Duties
- Finance and Accounting
- Lands and Estates
- Legal Services
- Materials
- Public Relations

== Headworks ==
- Dalun Headworks
- Barekese Headworks
- Weija Headworks
- Kpong Headworks
- Keseve Headworks
- Winneba Headworks
- Breman Asikuma Headworks
- Essakyir Headworks
- Brimsu Headworks
- Baifikrom Headworks
- Sekyere Hemang Headworks
- Kwanyaku Headworks

== Regions and Districts ==
- Accra West (Kasoa District, Nyanyarno District, Bortianor District, Weija District, Darkuman/Gbawe, Mamprobi District, Dansoman North District, Dansoman South District, Odorkor District, Kaneshie District, Sowutuom District, Amasaman District)
- Accra East
- Ashanti South
- Ashanti North
- Ashanti Production
- ATMA Production
- Central
- Eastern
- Northern
- Tema (Tema Industrial District, Tema West District, Tema Central District, Gbetsile, Ashaiman East District, Prampram District, Ada District, Kpong Akuse District, Ashaiman West District, Sakumono/Baatsonaa District)
- Upper East
- Upper West
- Volta
- Western
- Brong Ahafo
