= Food and Drugs Authority (Ghana) =

National regulatory of Ghana for the safety of food, drugs and cosmetics

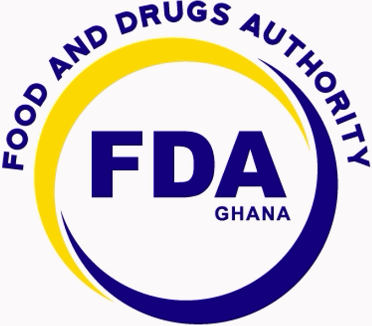
Food and Drugs Authority logo

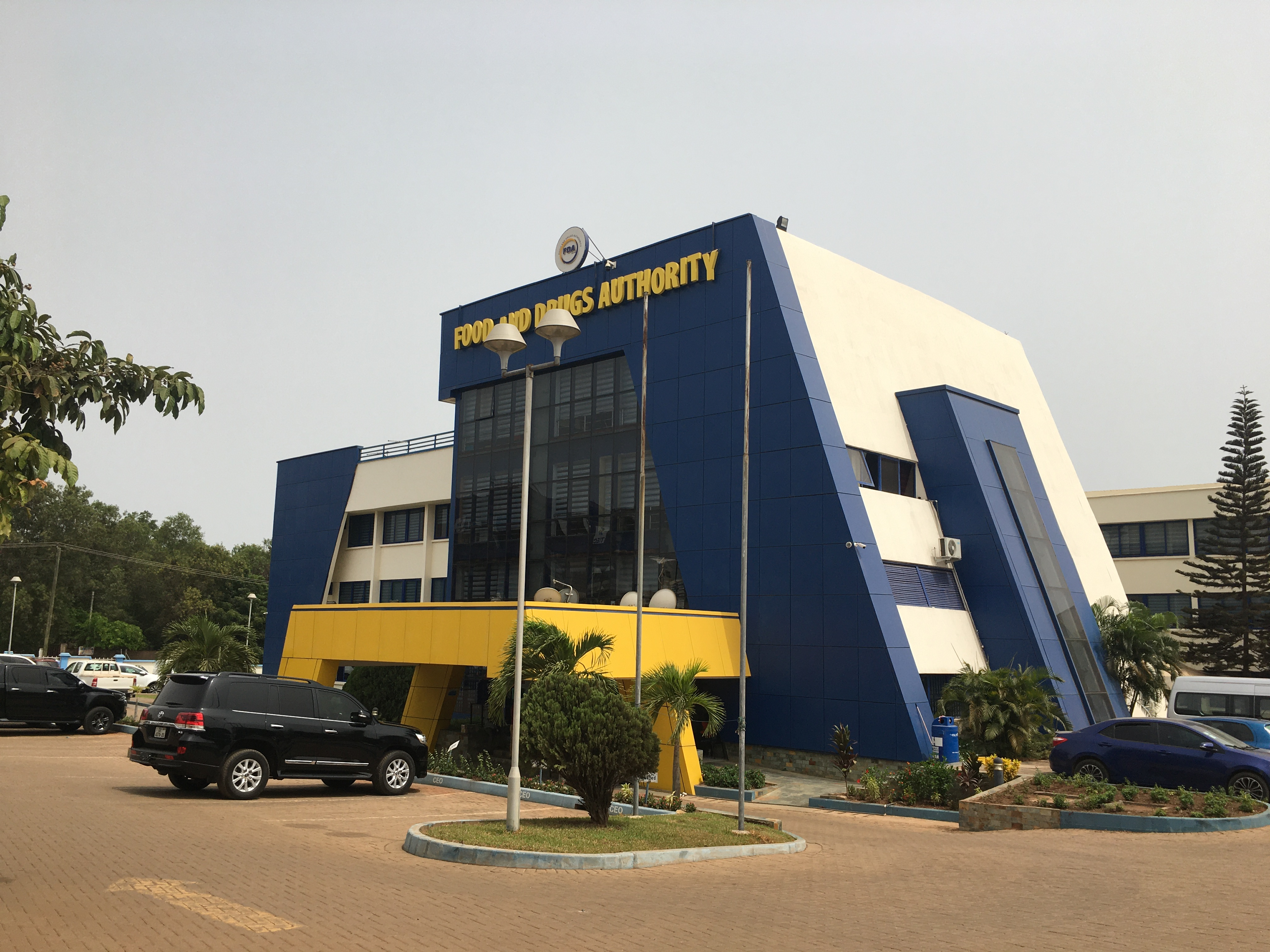
Food and Drugs Authority building

The Food and Drugs Authority (or FDA, formerly known as the Food and Drugs Board) is a Ghanaian government agency responsible for the inspection, certification, and proper distribution of foods and food products as well as drugs in Ghana.The FDA exists to ensure the safety, quality and efficacy of both human and veterinary products.

The Food and Drugs Authority (FDA) operates under the authority granted by Parts 6, 7, and 8 of the Public Health Act, 2012 (Act 851). Its role includes establishing and enforcing standards for the production, importation, exportation, sale, and distribution of food, drugs (herbal, allopathic, and veterinary), cosmetics, medical devices, household chemicals, tobacco products, blood, and blood products, as well as overseeing the regulation of clinical trials, all aimed at protecting public health and safety.

The board was established by the Food and Drugs Law 1992, PNDC Law 305B. Delese A. A. Darko is the CEO of FDA. In May 2020, the FDA was recognized by the World Health Organization as a Level Three listed institution.

The FDA Ghana office is located at 17 Indian Ocean Street, Nelson Mandela Avenue, in the South Legon Commercial Area of Shiashie Accra

== History ==
The Food and Drugs Board was initially established under the Food and Drugs Law of 1992 (PNDCL 305B) and later amended by the Food and Drugs (Amendment) Act 523 of 1996 to mandate salt fortification for addressing nutritional deficiencies and align the law with the 1992 Constitution of Ghana.

Prior to 1990, the regulation of drugs and pharmacy practice was governed by the Pharmacy and Drugs Act (Act 64) of 1961. However, in 1990, the Provisional National Defense Council (PNDC) enacted the Narcotics Drugs Control, Enforcement and Sanctions Law (PNDCL 236), establishing the Narcotics Control Board to combat the growing issue of drug abuse and the international challenges posed by illicit drug trafficking.

In 1992, the PNDC separated the regulation of non-narcotic drugs from the practice of pharmacy, leading to the enactment of the Food and Drugs Law, 1992 (PNDC 305B). This law governed the production, import, export, distribution, use, and advertising of food, drugs, cosmetics, chemical substances, and medical devices.

Later, the Pharmacy Act, 1994 (Act 489), established the Pharmacy Council to oversee the pharmacy profession and pharmacist registration. Although the Food and Drugs Law was passed in 1992, the inaugural board was not formed until August 26, 1997. In 2012, the Food and Drugs Board transitioned into the Food and Drugs Authority (FDA) with the enactment of the Public Health Act, 2012 (Act 851).

The FDA has promoted the "Fight the Fakes" campaign, which aims to inform Ghanaians about the dangers of substandard and falsified medicines. In 2023, the FDA approved a malaria vaccine created by University of Oxford researchers, making Ghana the first country to approve it for use.

== Divisions ==
- Food Division
- Health products and Technologies Division
- Technical Operation Division
- Corporate Services Division

== Heads of the Institution ==
NAME	DURATION	PROFESSION	ADMINISTRATION
Emmanuel Kyeremanten Agyarko	2001-2009	Pharmacist, Medical Doctor and Politician	Kuffour's Administration
Stephen Kwabena Opuni	2009-2013	Medical Doctor	Mahama's Administration
Hudu Mogtari	2013-2017	Pharmacist Global Health Regulation Strategist	Mahama's Administration
Delese Mimi Darko	2017-2025	Pharmacist	Nana Addo Dankwa Akufo Ado's Administration
Kwabena Frimpong Manso-Opuni	2025-now	Pharmacist, Lecturer	Mahama's Administration

== Laws Passed ==
Public Health Act 2012, (851): The Act integrated and updated Ghana's National public health legislation, formerly establishing the modern Food and Drugs Authority (FDA) under part six, (Tobacco) part seven (Food and Drugs), and part eight (Clinical Trials)

Food and Drugs (Amendment) Act, 196 (523): Amended the original1992 law to mandate salt fortification and align regulations with the national constitution.

Food and Drugs Law 1992 (PNDCL 305B): Originally created the original Food and Drugs Board to set and protect basic consumer safety standards.

== Achievements ==
WHO Maturity Level 3 (ML3): Ghana achieved WHO Maturity Level 3 status in 2020, becoming only the second country in the WHO African region to attain this internationally recognized standard for medicines regulatory systems.

Progressive Licensing Scheme (PLS): Through the Progressive Licensing Scheme, the FDA supported the small-scale local food processors to meet national food safety standards and obtain the necessary certificates.

The FDA launched targeted initiatives to help blood collection and testing facilities to meet licensing requirements and safe blood transfusion requirement.

WHO Prequalified Laboratory: The Drugs Laboratory at the center for Laboratory Services and Research attained a WHO Prequalified Control Quality status, becoming the only Laboratory in the ECOWAS sub-region to receive this international recognition.
