= Dormaa East (Ghana parliament constituency) =

Constituency in the Bono Region of Ghana

- constituency for the Parliament of Ghana
- Region: Bono Region of Ghana

Current constituency
- Party: National Democratic Congress
- MP: Rachel Amma Owusuah

Dormaa East is a parliamentary constituency in the Bono Region of Ghana. Rachel Amma Owusuah is the member of parliament for the constituency. She was elected on the ticket of the National Democratic Congress (NDC) to become the MP. She succeeded Yaw Ntow Ababio who represented the constituency in the 4th Republic parliament.

== See also ==
- List of Ghana Parliament constituencies
