= Kwaku Agyemang-Manu =

Ghanaian politician (born 1955)

Hon. Kwaku Agyemang-Manu
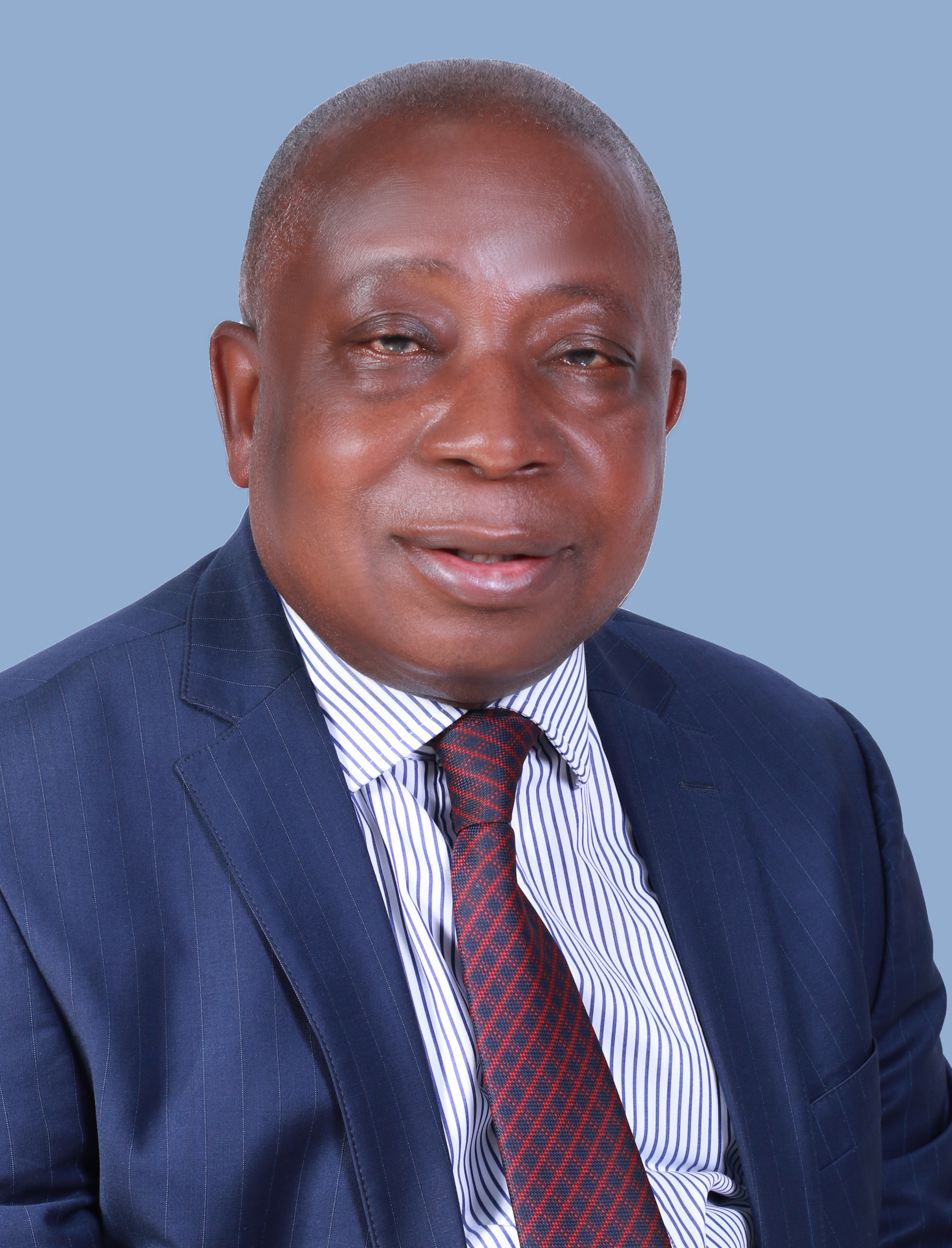

Minister for Health, Member of Parliament for Dormaa Central Constituency
- In office 7 January 2009 – 14 February 2024
- Preceded by: Samuel Abdulai Jabanyite

Personal details
- Born: Kwaku Agyeman-Manu; 6 September 1955 (age 70) Dormaa Ahenkro, Bono Region, Ghana
- Party: New Patriotic Party
- Occupation: Politician
- Committees: Members Holding Offices of Profit Committee

Kwaku Agyemang-Manu (born September 6, 1955) a Ghanaian politician. He is the Member of Parliament for Dormaa Central and was Ghana's Minister of Health between January 2017 and February 2024. He is a Chartered Management Accountant and obtained a Bachelor of Arts in Economics and Statistics from the University of Ghana in 1989.

== Early life and education ==
Agyeman-Manu was born in Dormaa Ahenkro in the then Brong Ahafo Region, now Bono Region. He had his G.C.E Ordinary Level in 1973 and his G.C.E Advanced Level in 1975. He obtained a Bachelor of Arts in Economics and Statistics from the University of Ghana in 1979. He also graduated with Management Accountancy from the London School of Accountancy. He became a Chartered Management Accountant and Associate Member in 1990.

== Career ==
He was the Director of finance at the Ghamot Company Limited and also at Toyota Ghana Company Limited. He was also the Deputy Chief Accountant at the MIM Timber Company Limited.

=== Political career ===
Agyeman-Manu is a member of the New Patriotic Party and the member of parliament for Dormaa Central Constituency in the then Brong Ahafo region of Ghana. He served as the Chairman of the Public Accounts Committee in the immediate-past Parliament and was the acting CEO of the National Health Authority in 2006, and also the deputy Minister of Finance and Economic Planning under former President Kufuor's administration (2001 to 2008). In this government, he served a Deputy Minister of State in the following Ministries: Trade and Industry, Interior, Finance, Communication and Roads and Transport. He has served on the Boards of institutions such as the Small Arms Commission of Ghana, the Ghana Revenue Authority, Bank of Ghana, and the Divestiture Implementation Committee.

=== Cabinet minister ===
In May 2017, President Nana Akufo-Addo named Kwaku Agyemang-Manu as part of nineteen ministers who would form his cabinet. The names of the 19 ministers were submitted to the Parliament of Ghana and announced by the Speaker of the House, Rt. Hon. Prof. Mike Ocquaye. As a Cabinet Minister, Agyemang-Manu is part of the inner circle of the President and aids in key decision-making policies for the country.

==== Committee ====
He is a member of the Members Holding Offices of Profit Committee.

== Controversies ==
=== Woyome scandal ===
In 2005, Mr. Kwaku Agyemang Manu, then Deputy Finance Minister under the Kufuor administration, issued a letter in the absence of the substantive Minister of Finance to a company owned by Mr. Alfred Agbesi Woyome in regards to the construction of stadia's for the CAN 2008. Mr. Woyome then sued the Government of Ghana in 2009 and secured a judgment of over GHC 51 million, relying on the letter issued by Mr. Kwaku Agyemang Manu.

=== Anti-snake procurement scandal ===
On the 8 February 2019 the President of IMANI Center for Policy & Education, a Ghanaian-based Think Tank, first reported about various procurement breaches by the Ministry of Health (MoH) in the procurement of Anti-Snake Venom Serum in an open letter on Facebook to the Minister. In an attempt to quell the issue, the Minister was heard on a local radio station, Adom FM, refuting the allegations of tender procurement breaches. A follow-up response was also sent to IMANI in this regard. These claims by the Minister were later found to be fabricated to cover up dealings with a local company called Pharmanova. The Public Procurement Authority (PPA) ruled against the Ministry and cited various procurement breaches in its decision and requested the Ministry to disqualify the two Pharmanova companies for double bidding amongst other issues and re-evaluate the tender with the remaining tenderers. This scandal was widely covered in the local media and many wondered why the Minister was still at post after these hard facts leveled against him had caused the loss of many lives in the country due to the shortage of this all important emergency drug. Up until March 2020, the Minister has tried various attempts to cancel the said tender, opened up new tenders for Anti-Snake Venom Serum, ignoring the ruling by the PPA and trying to allocate these new tenders again to Pharmanova Ghana Limited.

=== Condom scandal ===
In 2019, the Ministry of Health opened a tender for condoms under bizarre circumstances. Interestingly, no local company who could have supplied the condoms participated, raising questions if the tender was open and widely publicized as required by the Public Procurement Act. It is also interesting to note that the contract again went to Pharmanova Limited.

=== Pharmanova ===
A locally registered company owned and managed by Indian nationals has been active in Ghana since 2005 and has increasingly won many tenders especially under the tenure of Kwaku Agyemang Manu as the Minister of Health. No full-blown investigations have been started by the Government of Ghana whilst evidence of fraud and tender manipulation has been widely published by local media.

== Personal life ==
Agyeman-Manu is a Christian. He is married and has six known children.

== Public lie about his COVID-19 status ==
On June 13, 2020, several media outlets in Ghana announced that he, his wife and his son had tested positive for COVID-19 and were on admission at the University of Ghana Medical Centre (UGMC).

Kwaku Agyemang-Manu was admitted on Tuesday and was released on Friday whiles his wife and son are in critical conditions at the intensive care unit of UGMC. He claimed that he hasn't tested positive on COVID-19 on Saturday when he spoke via phone to a journalist called Afia Pokuaa aka Vim Lady. He claimed to be only resting and taking his usual diabetes medication. It is rumored that his conditions has created panic in Government and several top officials are isolating themselves. Nana Addo Dankwa Akufo-Addo, the President of Ghana, announced on National TV that his Minister of Health indeed contracted COVID-19.

It is to note that the parliamentary primaries of the NPP in the Ministers constituency have been postponed further. It will be interesting to see if the residence and especially delegates of his party further support him after this.

== Boasting about WHO Executive Board ==
Hon. Kwaku Agyeman-Manu has been called to serve on the executive board of the World Health Organization (WHO) as the representative of Ghana who is a member state of the WHO.It is to note that WHO elects its members from their Member States only. Being the Minister of Health in Ghana, he represents Ghana. Mr. Agyeman-Manu joins in as one of the seven Africans who represent their countries to support the executive board of WHO in May 2020.
