= National Health Insurance Authority =

Government agency of the Bahamas

The National Health Insurance Authority is an agency of the government of the Bahamas, established under the National Health Insurance Act 2003.

It is intended to secure the implementation of a national health insurance policy that ensures access to basic healthcare services to all residents.

In 2018 it proposed a very substantial extension to the existing National Health Insurance program, and associated increases in taxation.
