= University of Ghana Medical Centre =

Hospital in Greater Accra, Ghana

Coordinates: 5.63247°N 0.18546°W

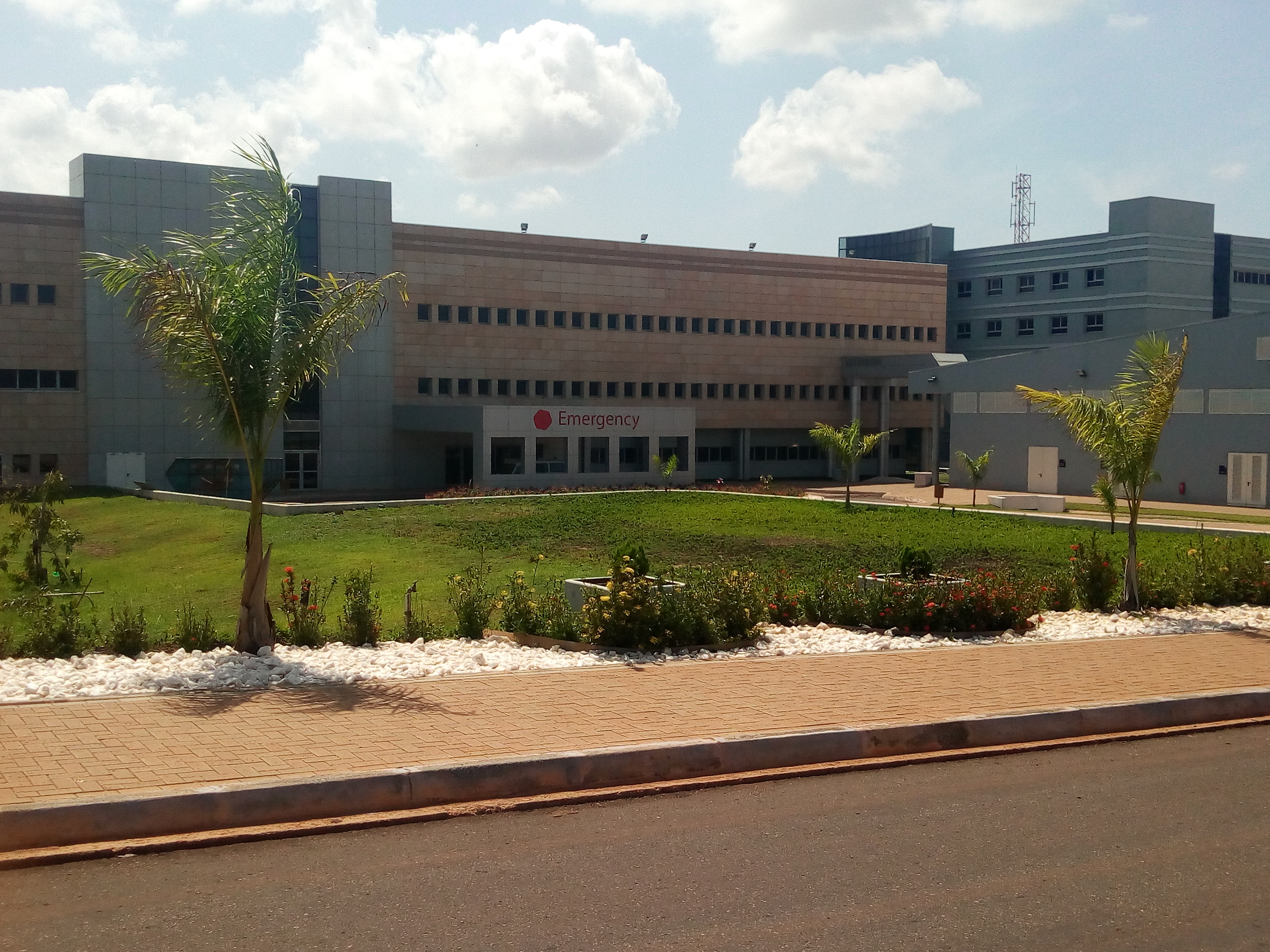

Geography
- Location: University of Ghana, Greater Accra, Ghana

Organisation
- Affiliated university: University of Ghana

Services
- Emergency department: yes
- Beds: 650

Links
- Website: ugmedicalcentre.org

The University of Ghana Medical Centre is a quaternary medical and research centre located on the campus of the University of Ghana in Accra, Ghana.

== History ==
The establishment of the University of Ghana Medical center was conceived by the faculty and administration of the University of Ghana and initiated under the Late President John Evans Atta-Mills.

In July 2024, The Universal Hospitals Group Limited (UHG) contributed essential items to the hospital as part of its corporate social responsibility efforts.

In April 2020, the hospital helped during the COVID-19 pandemic.

== Initiatives ==
=== Human Milk Bank ===
The Human Milk Bank initiative at the University of Ghana Medical Centre is Ghana’s first human milk banking programme, established to collect, screen, pasteurise, and distribute donated breast milk to premature and vulnerable infants whose mothers are unable to breastfeed. Launched in 2025, the initiative supports neonatal care by providing safe donor milk to hospitals, including Korle Bu Teaching Hospital and other health facilities.

== Services ==
- Laboratory Services
- Pharmaceutical services to patients
- Paediatric services
- Emergency medical services
- Obstetrics & Gynaecology Services

== See also ==
- University of Ghana Medical School
