= National responses to the COVID-19 pandemic in Africa =

Africa's first confirmed case of COVID-19 was announced in Egypt on 14 February 2020. Many preventive measures have been implemented in different countries in Africa, including travel restrictions, flight cancellations, event cancellations, school closures, and border closures. Other measures to contain and limit the spread of the virus has included curfews, lockdowns, and enforcing the wearing of face masks. The virus has spread throughout the continent. Lesotho, the last African sovereign state to have remained free of the virus, reported a case on 13 May 2020.

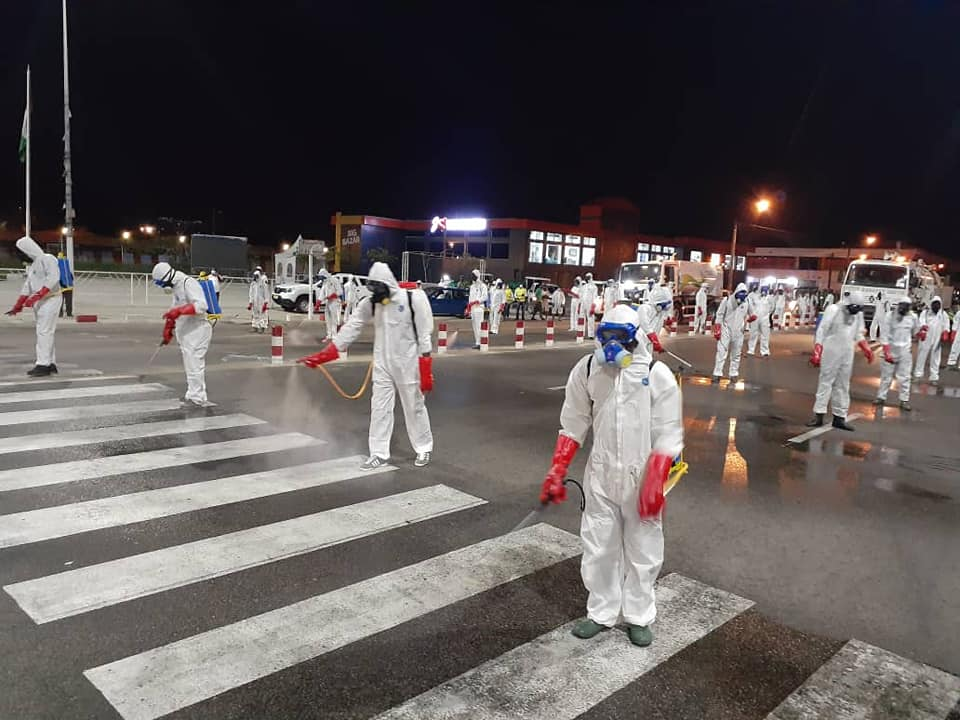
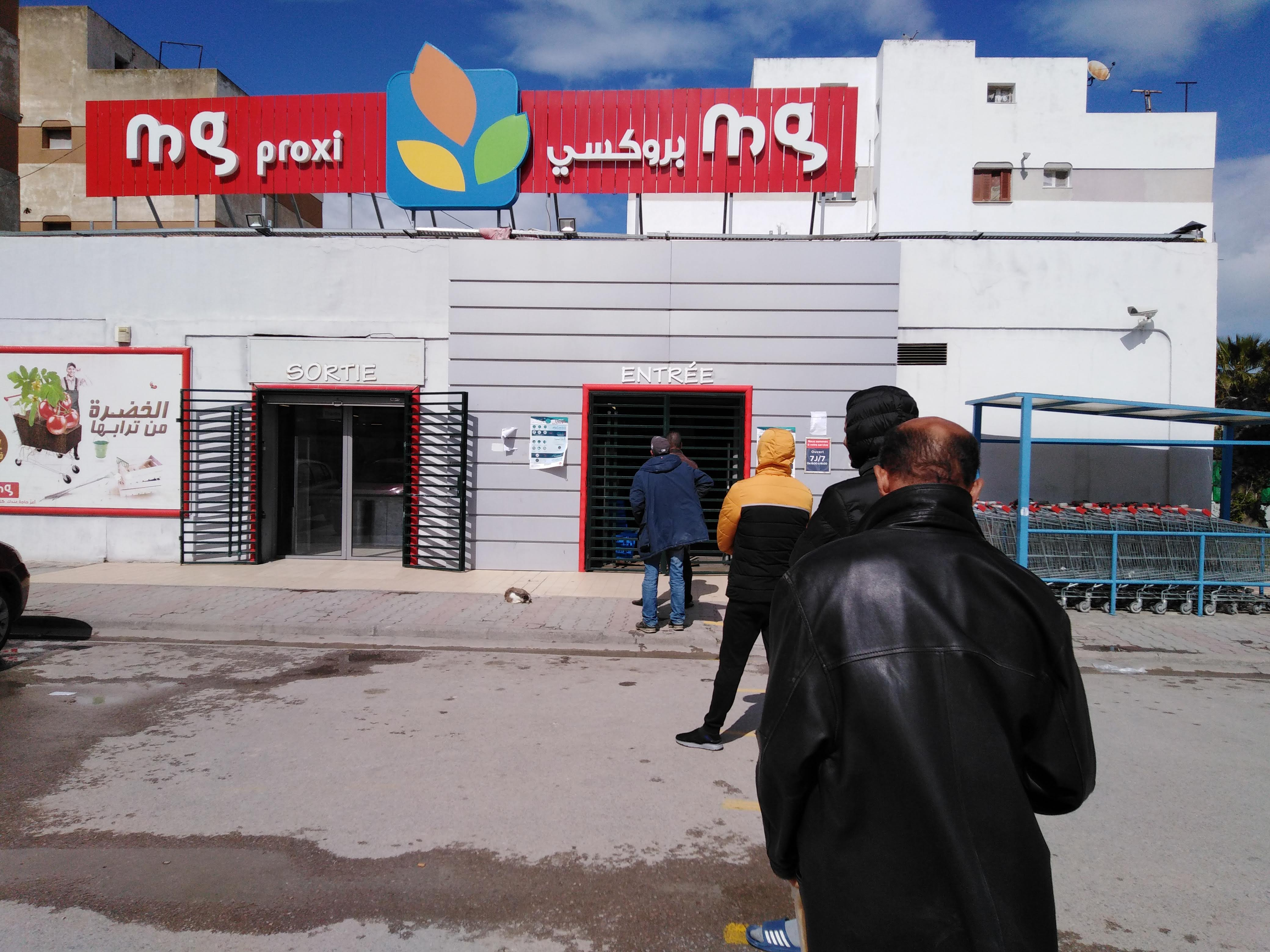
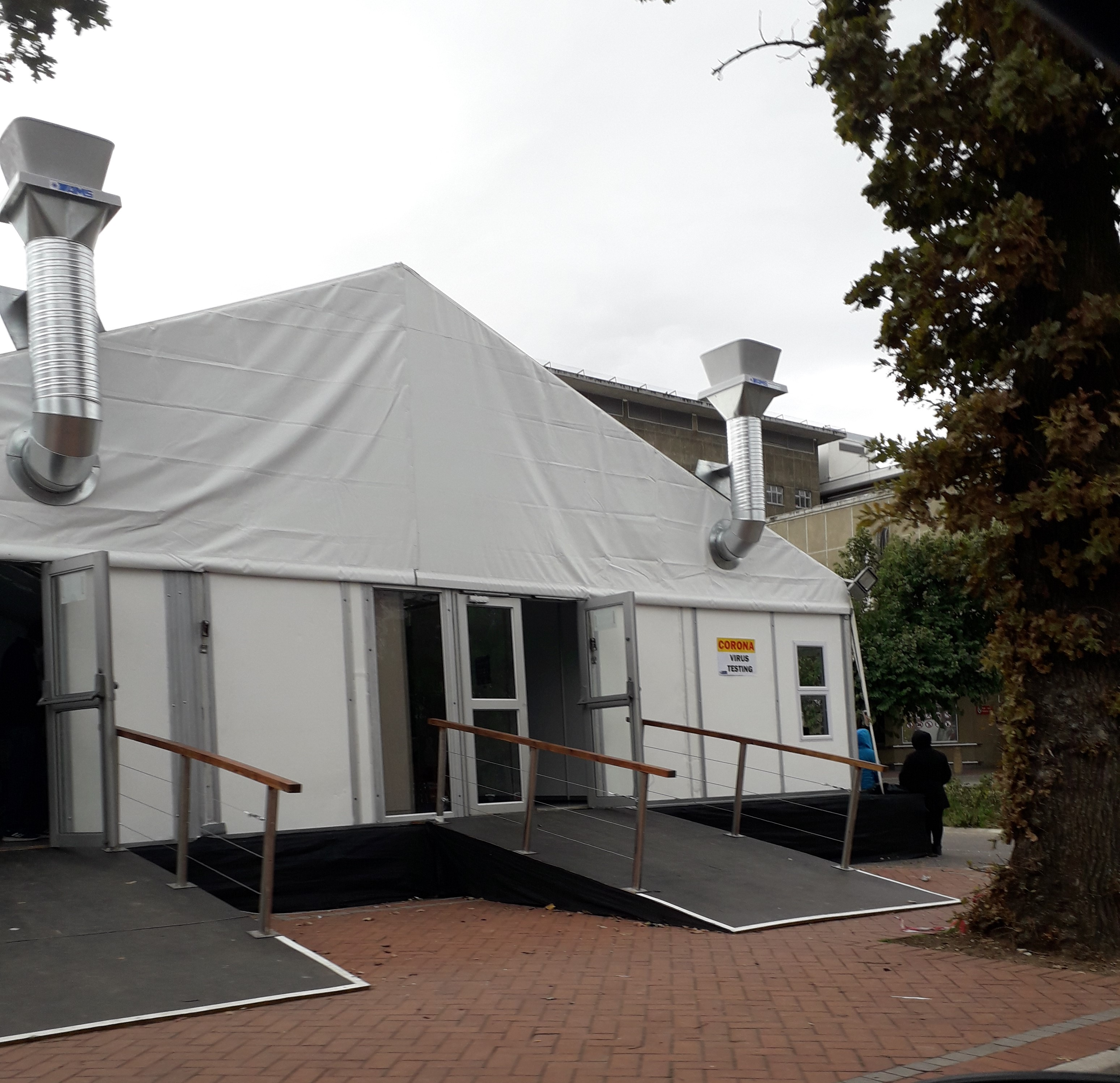
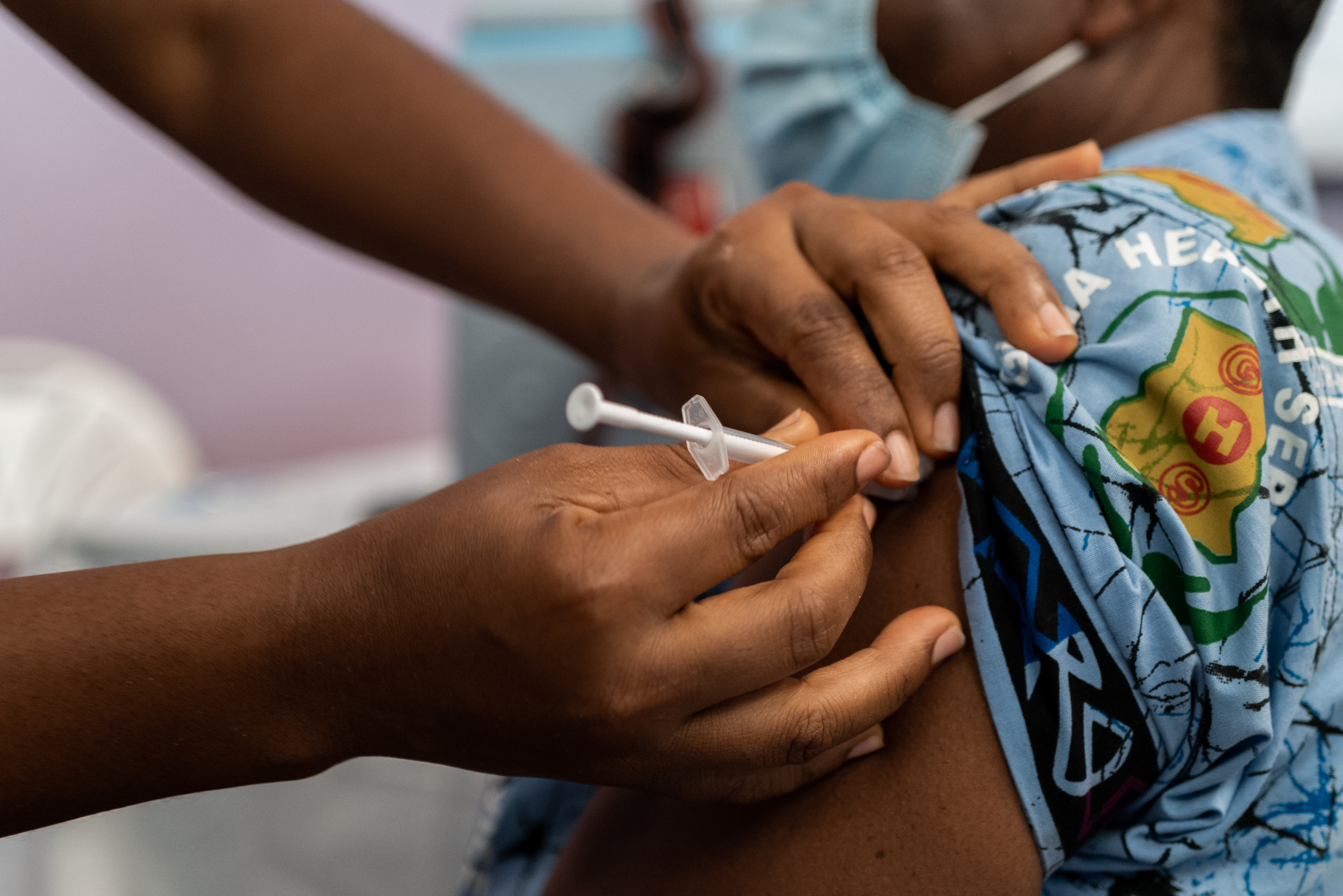
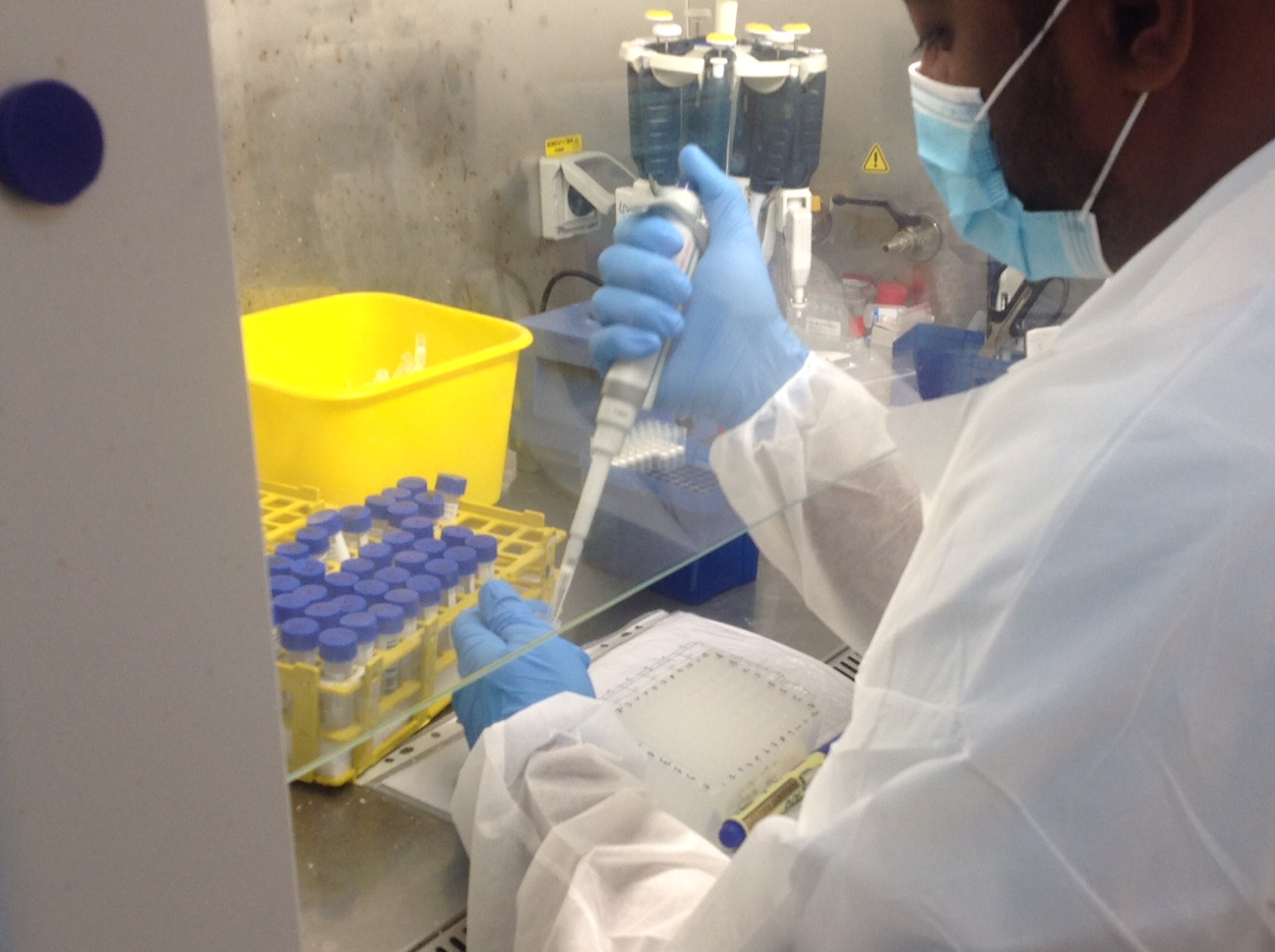
Clockwise:

Disinfection exercise in Ivory Coast

Social distancing at a grocery store in Tunisia

COVID-19 vaccination in Ghana

Testing for COVID-19 at Mauritius

COVID-19 testing tent in South Africa

== Timeline of responses ==
=== April ===
==== 1 April ====
Eritrea announced a three-week lockdown, commencing 2 April to combat the spread of COVID-19. Sierra Leone declared that a three-day lockdown would come into effect on Saturday (4 April).

==== 14 April ====
The Ghana Education Service and Zoomlion Ghana Limited joined forces to launch an initiative to fumigate all Senior High, special and technical schools in the country to curb the spread of the pandemic. President of Guinea Alpha Condé makes it compulsory for all citizens and residents to wear face masks, coming into effect on 18 April. Offenders face a civil disobedience tax of 30,000 Guinean francs (US$3.16, €2.8). Condéalso called upon all companies, ministries and NGOs to provide masks to their employees by Saturday and called for masks to be manufactured locally and sold cheaply.

=== May ===
==== 1 May ====
South Africa has begun to loosen its lockdown restrictions, allowing some businesses and factories to resume operations. Restaurants will be allowed to provide takeaway services. Recreational activities such as walking, cycling, and running will be allowed for three hours a day. The South African Government has maintained a ban on the sales of cigarettes and alcohol. President of Zimbabwe Emmerson Mnangagwa has extended Zimbabwe's lockdown for two more weeks and announced a US$720 million stimulus for affected companies.

==== 4 May ====
The International Monetary Fund has disbursed Cameroon US$226 million to meet urgent balance of payment needs caused by the COVID-19 pandemic.

The Nigerian Government has announced that a 24-hour "stay at home" order that had been imposed since 30 March in the capital Abuja and the states of Lagos and Ogun will be lifted over a six-week period. This has include allowing businesses and transportation to resume with people wearing face masks.

In South Africa, Dondo Mogajane, the Director-General of the National Treasury, has warned that South African economy could contract by 12% and that one-third of the workforce could be affected by the coronavirus as a result of the economic fallout of the COVID-19 pandemic.

Zimbabwean Finance and Economic Development Minister Mthuli Ncube has appealed for the International Monetary Fund to clear its debt arrears in order to access foreign funding for COVID-19 relief efforts.

=== June ===
==== 11 June ====
According to the Africa Chief of the World Health Organization, the coronavirus pandemic is "accelerating" in the continent, with community transmission reported in more than half of all African countries. Data indicates that it took 18 days for Africa to record 200,000 cases compared to the 98 days it took for the continent to record 100,000 cases.

Rwanda will receive a further $110 million in economic loans from the International Monetary Fund to assist the country in fighting the coronavirus pandemic. The IMF has now provided Rwanda with over $220 million during the crisis.

=== July ===
==== 2 July ====
The African Union revealed that the African continent has lost $55 billion in travel and tourism revenue during the coronavirus pandemic. The Union's Infrastructure and Energy Committee warned that some African airlines may not survive the economic consequences of the pandemic.

The coronavirus lockdown imposed in Nigeria's Kano State was lifted.

=== August ===
==== 3 August ====
In The Gambia, Finance Minister Mambury Njie, Energy Minister Fafa Sanyang, and Agriculture Minister Amie Fabureh all tested positive for COVID-19, and will subsequently self-isolate and work from home, taking the total number of cabinet ministers infected with the virus to five.

==== 4 August ====
The mayor of Kanifing District in The Gambia, Talib Bensouda, tested positive for COVID-19 and was admitted to hospital for treatment, becoming the sixth senior politician in the country to test positive. Nigerian private airline Air Peace announced that salaries have been cut and that around 70 pilots have been made redundant due to the impact of the COVID-19 pandemic on aviation.

Vice-President of Zimbabwe Constantino Chiwenga was announced as the country's new Health Minister, following the dismissal of previous minister Obadiah Moyo over several corruption allegations relating to the government's handling of the coronavirus pandemic.

== North Africa ==
=== Egypt ===
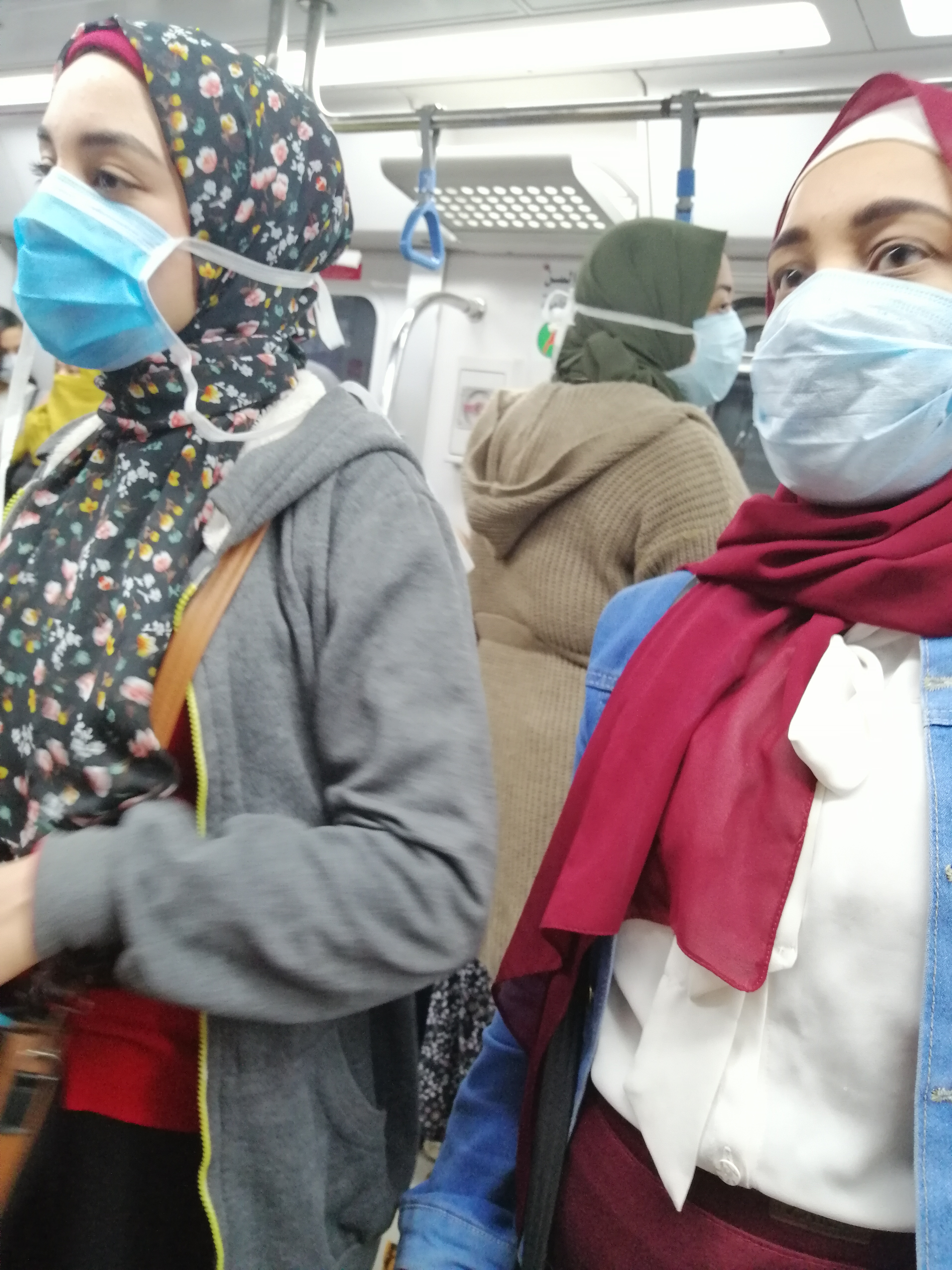
Women wearing face masks in Egypt

==== Travel restrictions ====
The minister of aviation closed the airports and suspended all air travel, effective 19 March. The decision to suspend flights in Egypt came into effect from 19 March until 31 March.

==== Timeline of Testing ====
As of 25 March, the ministry of health announced that 25,000 PCR tests have been done.

As of 17 April, 55,000 PCR tests have been done

As of 23 April, 90,000 PCR tests have been done

As of 9 May 105,000 PCR tests have been done

Egypt now has more than 40 PCR testing equipment dispersed all over the country

==== Censorship ====
Foreign media outlets have reported that certain individuals have been arrested for allegedly spreading false information about the coronavirus pandemic.

=== Morocco ===
==== Flight bans ====
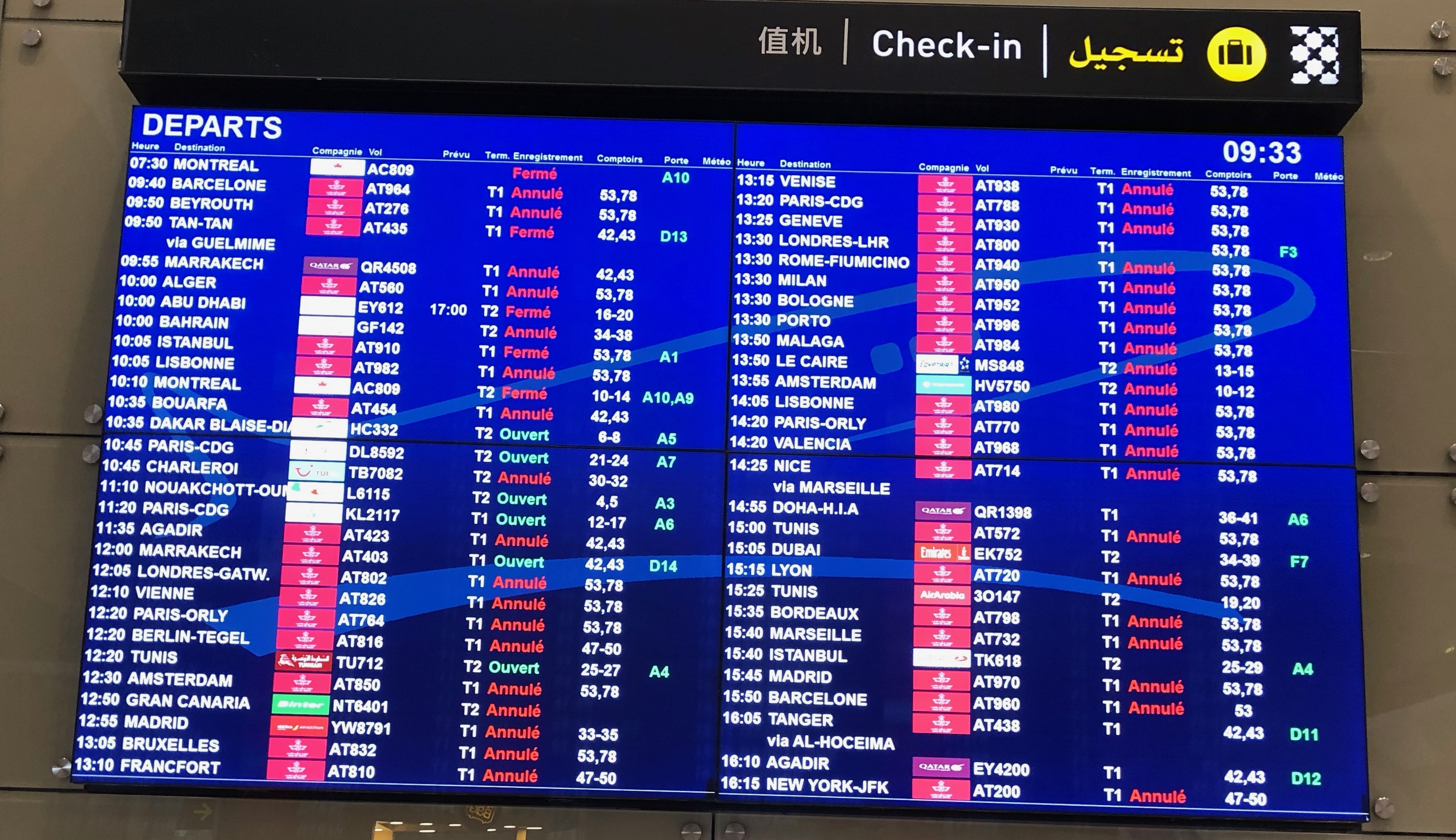
Flight cancellations at the Casablanca airport as a result of the COVID-19 pandemic

On 13 March 2020 the Government of Morocco announced they were suspending all passenger flights and ferry crossings to and from Algeria, Spain and France until future notice. On 14 March 2020, the Government announced it was suspending flights with an additional 25 countries. By that date, flights had been suspended to/from Algeria, Spain, France, Italy and China. Subsequently, air travel was to cease shortly between Morocco and Austria, Bahrain, Belgium, Brazil, Canada, Chad, Denmark, Egypt, Germany, Greece, Jordan, Lebanon, Mali, Mauritania, Netherlands, Niger, Norway, Oman, Portugal, Senegal, Switzerland, Sweden, Tunisia, Turkey and the UAE.

On 15 March 2020, the Government suspended all international flights, and did not announce an expected date for international flights to resume. It allowed a minority of flights for foreigners wishing to leave to embark on before completely shutting down its airports on the 22nd. On 21 June, the government re-opened the major airports to serve domestic flights only. On 9 July, the government announced that international flights were to resume, with access only for Moroccans or for foreigners residing within the Kingdom. Incoming passengers were required to bring a Coronavirus test result from their country of departure, issued less than 48 hours of the time of arrival. Moroccans living outside of, or foreigners residing within the Kingdom were allowed to leave the country.

==== State of medical emergency ====
Morocco declared a state of medical emergency on 19 March 2020, to take effect on 20 March 2020 at 6:00 pm local time and to remain in effect until 20 April 2020 with possibility to extend for a longer period. This directive requires the authorization of local state officials for citizens to leave their homes, while making exceptions for workers at supermarkets, pharmacies, banks, gas stations, medical clinics, telecommunications companies, and essential freelance jobs. A direct 24-hour hotline was set up to "reinforce direct communication and urge vigilance to fight the impact of the coronavirus pandemic and safeguard the health of citizens." In April, 2020, the government pardoned 5,654 prisoners, and it put forward procedures to protect inmates from the COVID-19 outbreak.

==== Emergency Fund ====
On 15 March, King Mohammed VI announced the creation of an emergency fund (labelled as Fonds spécial pour la gestion de la pandémie du Coronavirus (Covid-19)) in order to upgrade health infrastructure and support the worst affected economic sectors. The fund has a volume of 10 billion dirham ($1 billion).

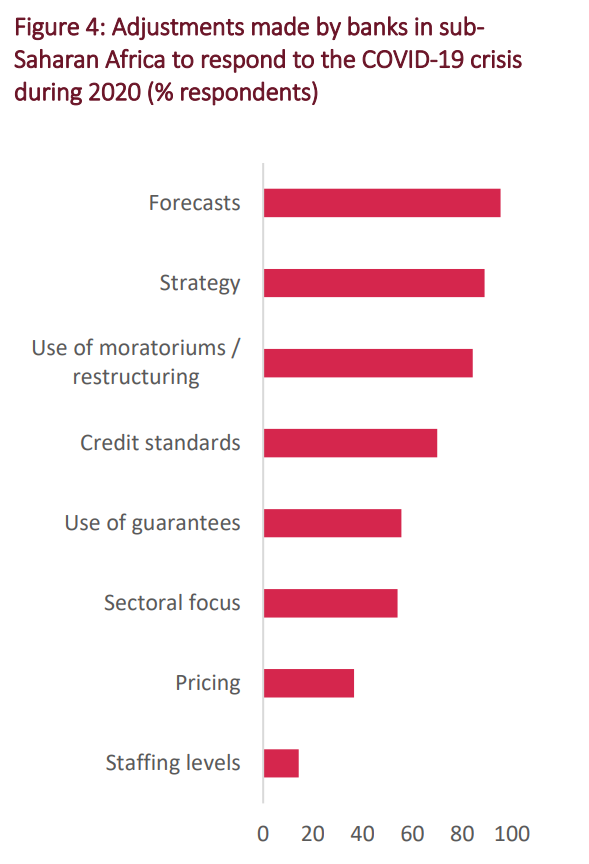
Adjuments made by banks in sub-Saharan Africa to respond to the COVID-19 crisis during 2020 (% respondents), as found in the European Investment Bank's Banking in Africa survey.

== Central Africa ==
=== Angola ===
Effective from 20 March, all Angolan borders were closed for 15 days. President João Lourenço banned all arrivals at airports and stopped passenger vessels docking at Angolan ports for 15 days. All these bans will last until 4 April. All schools in Angola closed on 24 March.

=== Cameroon ===
==== Government measures ====
On 18 March, Cameroonian Prime Minister Joseph Dion Ngute closed its land, air and sea borders.

On 30 March, the Minister of Health announced the imminent launch of a coronavirus test campaign in the city of Douala. Dedicated teams will go door-to-door in the economic capital from 2 to 6 April, says the minister.

On 10 April, the government took 7 additional measures to stop the spread of COVID-19 in Cameroon. These measures take effect from Monday, 13 April 2020.

- Measure 1: Wearing a mask in all areas open to the public;
- Measure 2: Local production of drugs, screening tests, protective masks and hydro-alcoholic gels;
- Measure 3: Establishment of specialized COVID-19 treatment centers in all regional capitals;
- Measure 4: Intensification of the screening campaign with the collaboration of the Center Pasteur;
- Measure 5: Intensification of the awareness campaign in urban and rural areas in both official languages;
- Measure 6: Continuation of activities essential to the economy in strict compliance with the directives of 17 March 2020;
- Measure 7: Sanction

On 15 April, following the claims of the Human Rights Commission of the Cameroon Bar Association, President Paul Biya announced the release of certain prisoners in connection with COVID-19.

On Tuesday 5 May, the Minister of Health announced the provision to healthcare personnel of 50,000 coveralls, 320,000 surgical masks, 220 backpack sprayers, 10,000 pairs of overshoes. In late June, the government announced that the 2021 Africa Cup of Nations would be postponed until 2022.

=== Democratic Republic of the Congo ===
==== Prevention measures ====
Schools, bars, restaurants, and places of worship were closed. On 19 March, President Félix Tshisekedi announced flight suspensions. On 24 March, he imposed a state of emergency and closed the borders.

== West Africa ==
=== Ghana ===
The first two cases of the corona virus disease was confirmed on 12 March 2020, when two infected people came to Ghana; one from Norway and the other from Turkey. On 11 March, President Nana Akufo-Addo directed the Minister of Finance, Ken Ofori-Atta, to make the cedi equivalent of $US100 million available to enhance Ghana's coronavirus preparedness and response plan. The Ghana COVID-19 Private Sector Fund was also initiated to aid in the fight against the pandemic.

==== Bans and Lock downs ====
On 15 March, at 10 pm, President Nana Akufo-Addo banned all public gatherings including conferences, workshops, funerals, festivals, political rallies, church activities and other related events to reduce the spread of COVID-19 at a press briefing on the state of COVID-19. Basic schools, senior high schools and universities, both public and private, have also been closed. Only BECE and WASSCE candidates were permitted to remain in school under social distancing protocols. The use of Veronica buckets have become very popular in Ghana following the outbreak of the novel coronavirus as citizens engage in frequent hand washing to stem its spread. On 30 March, the partial lock down of Accra and Kumasi took effect. In April 2020, At a press briefing, the Director General of the Ghana Health Service, announced the commencement of local production of nose masks as part of efforts to arrest the spread of the pandemic. According to the new Executive Instrument, E.I. 164, signed by the President on 15 June 2020, people who refuse to wear face masks in public could face jail terms of between 4–10 years or a fine of between GHS12,000 (approx US$2,065) and GHS60,000 (approx US$10,320) or both would be made. This came after the mandatory wearing of nose masks

==== Government responses ====
From 3 April, over 464 markets were disinfected across the country. The second phase of nationwide fumigation begun in July. On 23 September, the MoE with GES collaborated with Zoomlion to disinfect SHS across Ghana to pave way for the reopening of schools. The Finance Minister claimed in his report that the Government spent about 54.3 million Ghana cedis to provide cooked and uncooked food to the vulnerable during the 3-week lockdown. He also claimed Government would provide free electricity and water for the rest of 2020.

The Parliament of Ghana granted a tax waiver of GHS174 million cedis (equivalent to US$30 million) on income taxes of frontline workers. This spanned for three months from July to September 2020. On 15 October, the MoH received a COVID-19 AI software for detecting the virus on Chest X-rays. Government also relaunched the GH COVID-19 tracker app after it was launched on 13 April. Ghana begun the local production of nose masks as well as Medical gowns, head covers, and medical scrubs. The government stated that about 18.8million face masks have been manufactured by the country with one industry producing one million face masks a day. Various treatment centers were built across the country such as the Ghana Infectious Disease Centre, to help in the National COVID-19 Treatment. Ghana became the first country to use drone aircraft in the fight against the pandemic through the transport of COVID-19 test samples and PPEs.

=== Guinea-Bissau ===
==== Restrictions ====
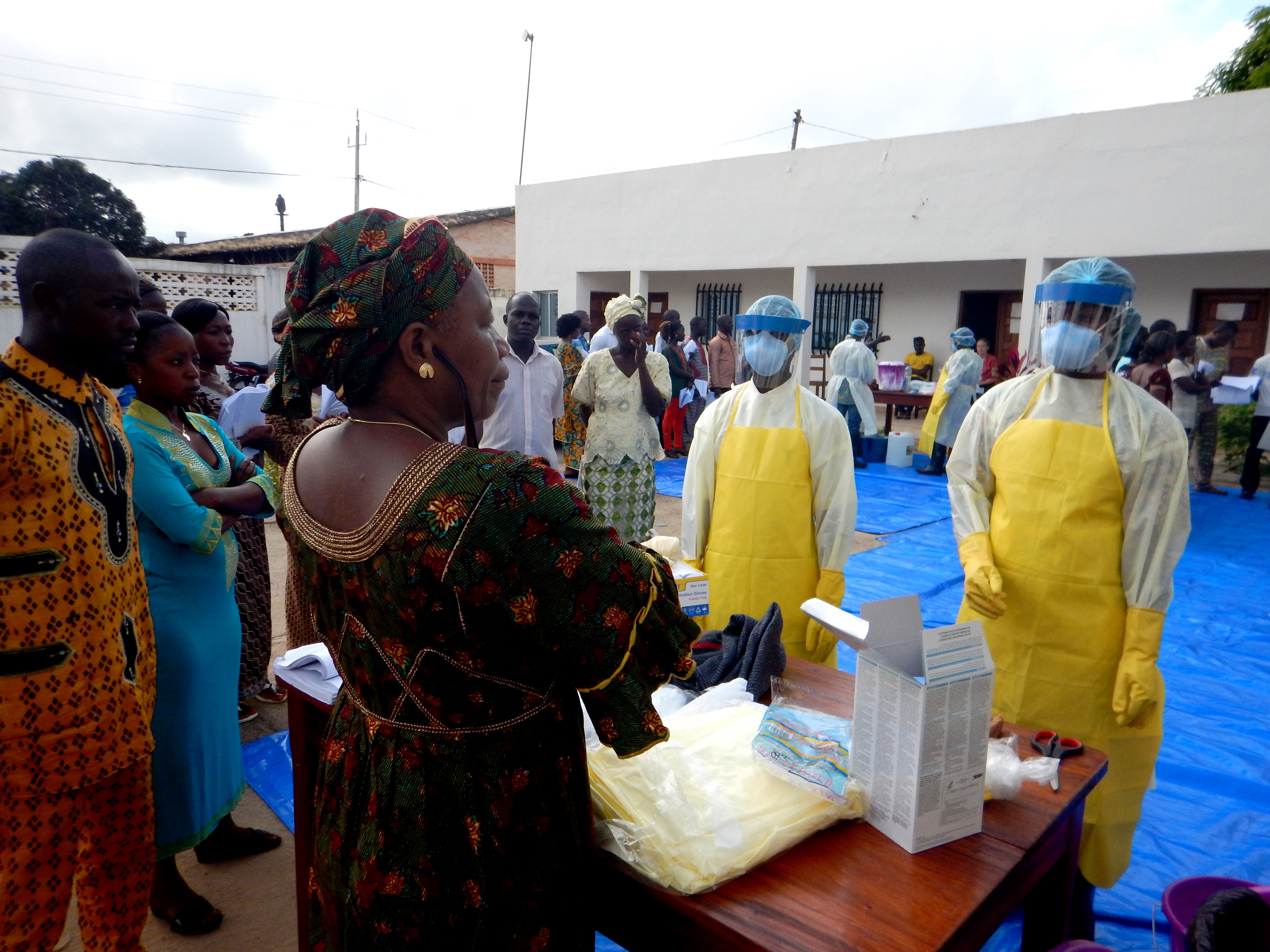
Guinea-Bissau's frontline healthcare workers

On 27 March, a state of emergency was declared to reduce the spread of the COVID-19 pandemic by the government of Guinea-Bissau. Transportation through the sea and air as well as the borders of the land were closed. The government also implemented guidelines and laws to prevent the spread of the COVID-19 virus within the community. These laws limited social gatherings and made screenings available for early detection of the virus. The prevention of COVID-19 was led by religious leaders and public figures, as well as traditional power entities and social collectives during communication and social mobilisation. Guinean families were supported through awareness and prevention information against COVID-19 which were provided through networks, associations and most importantly radio stations, which helps to reduces socio-cultural barriers such as attitudes, cultural differences, ethnicity and status which affects access to information about COVID-19 in Guinea-Bissau. Both Guinea-Bissau's government and the United Nations Children's Emergency Fund (UNICEF) have helped in Guinea-Bissau containment of the pandemic. The UNICEF and the Secretary of State for Social Communication embedded preventative measures and techniques to the Bissau-Guinean public through social media as well as national television to prevent the spread of COVID-19. Public sanitations across 960 communities were provided by the UNICEF (WASH program) around the country to curb the spread of the virus.

==== Financial support ====
Guinea-Bissau has been supported by many organisations including Global Partnership for Education (GPE), MPTF and GAVI, as well as the government of Guinea-Bissau which has made available $200, 000 for the country to help detain COVID-19. The Ministries of Finance and Health financially supported hospitals in Guinea Bissau on 27 March 2020. The Fiscal policy supported and improved hospitals. Doctors and nurses received pay benefits of $55,000 monthly and $50,000 for medicine whiles $100,000 was reserved for meals to feed patients and the hospital staff. An official of the WHO in Guinea-Bissau has reported that Cuba has sent a medical team consisting doctors and nurses to assist in fighting the pandemic during the outbreak.

=== Mali ===
Ibrahim Boubacar Kéïta, the President of the Republic of Mali declared a state of emergency and instituted a curfew from 9.00 p.m. to 5:00 a.m. On 18 March, President Ibrahim Boubacar Keita suspended flights from affected countries, closed schools and banned large public gatherings. However planned elections in March–April, which had already been postponed several times for the poor security situation in the country, went ahead as planned.

=== Nigeria ===
==== Travel ban ====
On 18 March Nigeria placed a travel ban on 13 countries with high cases of the virus, the countries are; United States, United Kingdom, South Korea, Switzerland, Germany, France, Italy, China, Spain, Netherlands, Norway, Japan and Iran.

==== Federal government reaction ====
The Federal government of Nigeria has instructed institutions to shut down for 30 days as a lockdown measure to limit the spread of COVID-19. It has also banned public gatherings. The state government of Lagos has asked schools to close and banned public gatherings of more than 50 people, particularly religious gatherings.

The Nigerian Government announced on 4 April about the creation of a 500 billion naira (US$1.39 billion) coronavirus crisis intervention fund to upgrade its healthcare infrastructure.President of Malawi Peter Mutharika announces several measures to support small and medium businesses including tax breaks, reducing fuel allowances and increasing risk allowances for health workers. The President also announces that he and his Cabinet will take a 10 percent salary cut. Several schools in Nigeria have shut down, following the directives of the federal government at Abuja. This led the Management of one of the most populated schools in Nigeria, the Federal Polytechnic Nekede, Owerri to declare an emergency holidays a precaution against COVID-19, stating that the emergency holiday will last for 30 days. The institution had already fixed the dates for the 2019/2020 academic year examinations.

==== State government responses ====
On 9 March, the President Muhammadu Buhari established a Presidential Task Force for the control of the virus in the country. On 30 March, Adamawa State government announced the closure of their state borders for 14 days with effect from 31 March, ordering a total lockdown in the state. The state government also announced that the ban affects tricycle, taxis and bus operators throughout the state. The state government also banned social activities and ordered the closure of all markets, except food markets, medicine markets and filling stations, directing banks to provided skeletal services. The lockdown of Ogun State that was supposed to start from 30 March, was shifted to commence from 3 April, after the state government made a request to the federal government to allow them provide food for their residents.

== East Africa ==
=== Ethiopia ===
On 16 March 2020, the office of the Prime Minister announced that schools, sporting events, and public gatherings shall be suspended for 15 days. On 20 March 2020, Ethiopian Airlines suspended flights to 30 countries affected with the corona virus and by 29 March 2020, it extended to more than 80 countries.

It was announced on 20 March that, anyone entering the country should undergo a mandatory self-quarantine for 14 days. Night clubs in Addis Ababa are also to remain closed until further notice.

On 23 March 2020, Ethiopia closed all land borders and deployed security forces to halt the movement of people along the borders. On 8 April 2020, the Council of Ministers declared a five-month long state of emergency in response to the growing number of coronavirus cases. The state of emergency was approved on 10 April by the parliament.

==== Regional governments ====
After multiple cases of the virus were reported, several regions of the country took measures to prevent further spread of the virus. Travel restrictions and lock downs were imposed by Amhara, Oromia, Tigray, Southern Nations, Nationalities, and Peoples' Region, Benishangul Gumuz, Afar, Somali, Gambela regions.

==== Amhara ====
On 25 March 2020, the Amhara regional government ordered civil servants that are at high risk to work from home.

On 29 March 2020, a ban on all incoming public transportation vehicles were ordered.

On 30 March 2020, it was announced that anyone who returned from abroad in the previous three weeks should report to the local health offices.

On 31 March 2020, a 14-day total lockdown of Bahir Dar and three other towns was imposed.

==== Oromia ====
On 29 March 2020, city of Adama in Oromia ordered a complete ban on public transportation systems. The order came after two people tested positive for the virus in the city. The town of Asella and Metu also took measures banning movement of all public transportation to and from the city.

On 30 March 2020, a complete ban on cross-country and inter-city public transportation was imposed. On 7 April 2020, the regional state released 13,231 prisoners.

==== Tigray ====
On 26 March 2020, Tigray Region declared a 15-day region-wide state of emergency, banning all travel and public activities within the region to prevent the spread of the virus.

On 29 March 2020, closure of all cafes and restaurants were ordered. The measures taken also include banning landlords from evicting tenants or increasing rent. Any travelers entering the state are also required to report to the nearest health office.

On 6 April 2020, the regional state released 1,601 prisoners.

=== Kenya ===
In response to the rise of coronavirus cases in Kenya to three, on 15 March the government of Kenya closed all schools and directed remote work wherever possible. Travel restrictions were later imposed to prevent non-residents from entry. Kenyan nationals and residents were required to self-quarantine for a minimum of fourteen days.

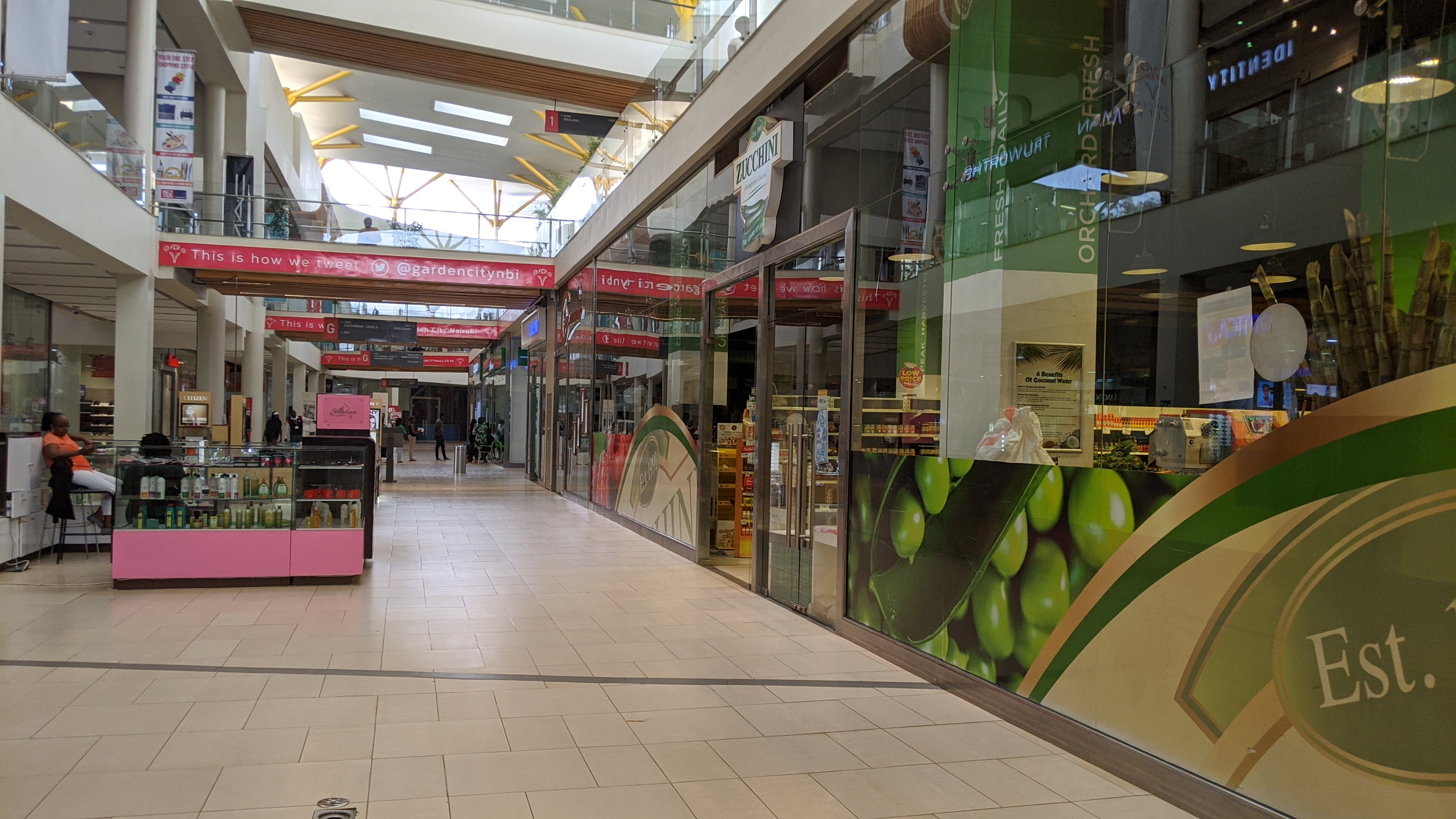
Garden City Mall empty as a result of COVID-19 restrictions

On 22 March, following the confirmation of an additional eight cases, bringing the total to 16 nationally, the Kenyan government introduced additional measures and directives to reduce the spread of coronavirus in the country. These measures included a suspension of all international flights effective at midnight on 25 March, with the exception of cargo flights (all persons entering the country will be compelled to undergo quarantine at a government facility). The government further stipulated that any persons, including senior government officials, found to be in violation of quarantine measures would be forcefully quarantined at their own expense. All bars were to remain closed from 22 March, with restaurants allowed to remain open for takeaway services only. All public service vehicles such as matatus and buses had to adhere to passenger-distancing guidelines previously stipulated on 20 March. Further, all public gatherings at churches, mosques, funerals and elsewhere were restricted to no more than 15 people, and weddings were banned.

==== Nationwide curfew and police response ====
The 7pm – 5am curfew announced on 25 March was accompanied by reports of police brutality. First-hand accounts and video footage in several cities, including Nairobi and Mombasa, indicated that police used beatings and tear gas on 27 March. Some accounts indicate that detention resulted in crowding of people into small areas, contrary to the curfew's goal of increasing social distancing. Kenyan officials and government outlets later condemned police behaviour.

==== Economic response ====
On 25 March, President Uhuru Kenyatta, following the reporting of an additional three cases, announced a nationwide curfew on unauthorized movement from 7pm to 5am beginning on Friday, 27 March. The government also unveiled measures to buffer Kenyans against financial hardships arising movement restrictions associated with the coronavirus crisis.

=== Madagascar ===
Lockdowns were implemented in at least two cities. The government announced on 17 March that all international and regional flights would be suspended for 30 days starting 20 March. In the central region with Antananarivo, a lockdown was imposed from 6 to 20 July in response to a spike in new cases in the capital.

The Central Bank of Madagascar injected hundreds of billions of ariary into the banking system to ease the economic damage caused by COVID-19.

On 20 April 2020, Madagascar President Andry Rajoelina officially launched a coronavirus "cure" dubbed Covid-Organics. Developed by the Madagascar Institute of Applied Research (MIAR), the herbal tea was made using artemisia and other locally sourced herbs. Soldiers were dispatched to hand out batches of Covid-Organic, with Colonel Willy Ratovondrainy announcing on state television that the tea would "strengthen immunity". However, the National Academy of Medicine of Madagascar (ANAMEM) voiced its skepticism, while the World Health Organization (WHO) cautioned that there was no proof for any coronavirus cure at the time of Covid-Organic's launch. The African Union has entered into discussions with the Malagasy government to test the drug's safety and efficiency.

=== Mauritius ===
==== Closure of educational institutions ====
On 18 March 2020, amidst a surge in fresh cases being confirmed in Mauritius, the Government of Mauritius announced that all schools and universities would be shut until further notice. Education programs were provided to all students online and on the television through the Mauritius Broadcasting Corporation.

In May 2020, the government approved the distribution of 2,500 tablet computers to children who are on the social security register.

==== Travel and entry restrictions ====
On 18 March 2020, the Mauritian Prime Minister announced that all passengers, including Mauritians and foreigners, would be prohibited from entering Mauritian territory for the next 15 days, which started at 6:00 GMT (10:10 am Mauritian time). Passengers wishing to leave Mauritius would be allowed to leave. Cargo airplanes and ships would also be allowed to enter the country. Some Mauritians who were stranded in different airports around the world were allowed to enter Mauritian territory on 22 March 2020. They were required to spend 14 days in isolation at different premises provided by the government.

==== Legislation ====
On 19 March 2020, the following notices, order and regulations were published in the Government Gazette:

- The Ministry of Health was of the view that Mauritius appeared to be threatened with, or infected by the coronavirus and notice was given that sections 79 to 83 of the Public Health Act shall apply to Mauritius;
- The Quarantine (Quarantinable Diseases) Regulations 2020 were published.
- The Ministry of Health gave order under sections 79 to 83 of the Public Health Act to prohibit the conveyance, excluding any conveyance transporting goods, from entering the territory of Mauritius as from 10:00 am on 19 March 2020 for a period of 15 days under Regulation 3 of The Quarantine (Quarantinable Diseases) Regulations 2020.
- The Ministry of Health gave an order under Regulation 5 of The Quarantine (Quarantinable Diseases) Regulations 2020, prohibiting any passenger, excluding crew members, from boarding or disembarking from a conveyance as from 10:00 am on 19 March 2020 for a period of 15 days.

The Prevention and Mitigation of Infectious Disease (Coronavirus) Regulations 2020 were published in the Government Gazette on 20 March 2020. Any person who contravenes the regulations shall, on conviction, be liable to a fine not exceeding MUR 500 and to imprisonment for a term not exceeding six months. The regulation was amended on 22 March 2020. On 22 March 2020, the Curfew Order (General Notice No.512 of 2020) was issued by the Government of Mauritius, aimed at mitigating the spread of COVID-19 in Mauritius. The Curfew Order became effective as at 23 March 2020 at 20:00 hrs local time. Any person who contravenes the Curfew Order, shall on conviction, be liable to a fine not exceeding MUR 500 and to imprisonment for a term not exceeding 6 months. On 30 March 2020, the Curfew Order was extended till 15 April 2020 at 20:00 hrs local time. On 16 May 2020, the COVID-19 (Miscellaneous Provisions) Bill and the Quarantine Bill were passed in the National Assembly. The COVID-19 (Miscellaneous Provisions) Bill aims at empowering the economy, save enterprises and jobs, and build for a recovery overtime. The objectives of the Quarantine Bill are to prevent the resurgence of COVID-19 infection, and step up the preparedness and response of the country to any future pandemic. Any person who contravenes the Quarantine Act, shall on conviction, be liable to a fine not exceeding MUR 500,000 and to imprisonment for a term not exceeding 5 years. The two bills were heavily criticized by some Mauritians. The Prevention of Resurgence and Further Spread of Epidemic Disease (COVID-19) Regulations 2020 was published in the Government Gazette on 17 May 2020. As per the regulation, any person who does not wear protective mask and respect social and physical distancing rule shall commit an offence and shall, on conviction, be liable to a fine not exceeding 50,000 rupees and to imprisonment for a term not exceeding 2 years.

=== Rwanda ===
In an attempt to stop the spread of coronavirus, the Rwandan Ministry of Health announced on 18 March, that all international commercial passenger flights would be suspended for 30 days, with effect from 20 March. Less than a day later, on 21 March, officials announced a two-week lockdown. Remote work was mandated by public and private employees, under strict measures. All borders are also to be closed, cargo and Rwandan nationals being exempt, with a mandatory 14-day quarantine.

In addition to the lockdown measures taken in March (see above), Rwanda National Police on 12 April announced the usage of drones to deliver messages to local communities on how to combat the coronavirus.

=== Uganda ===
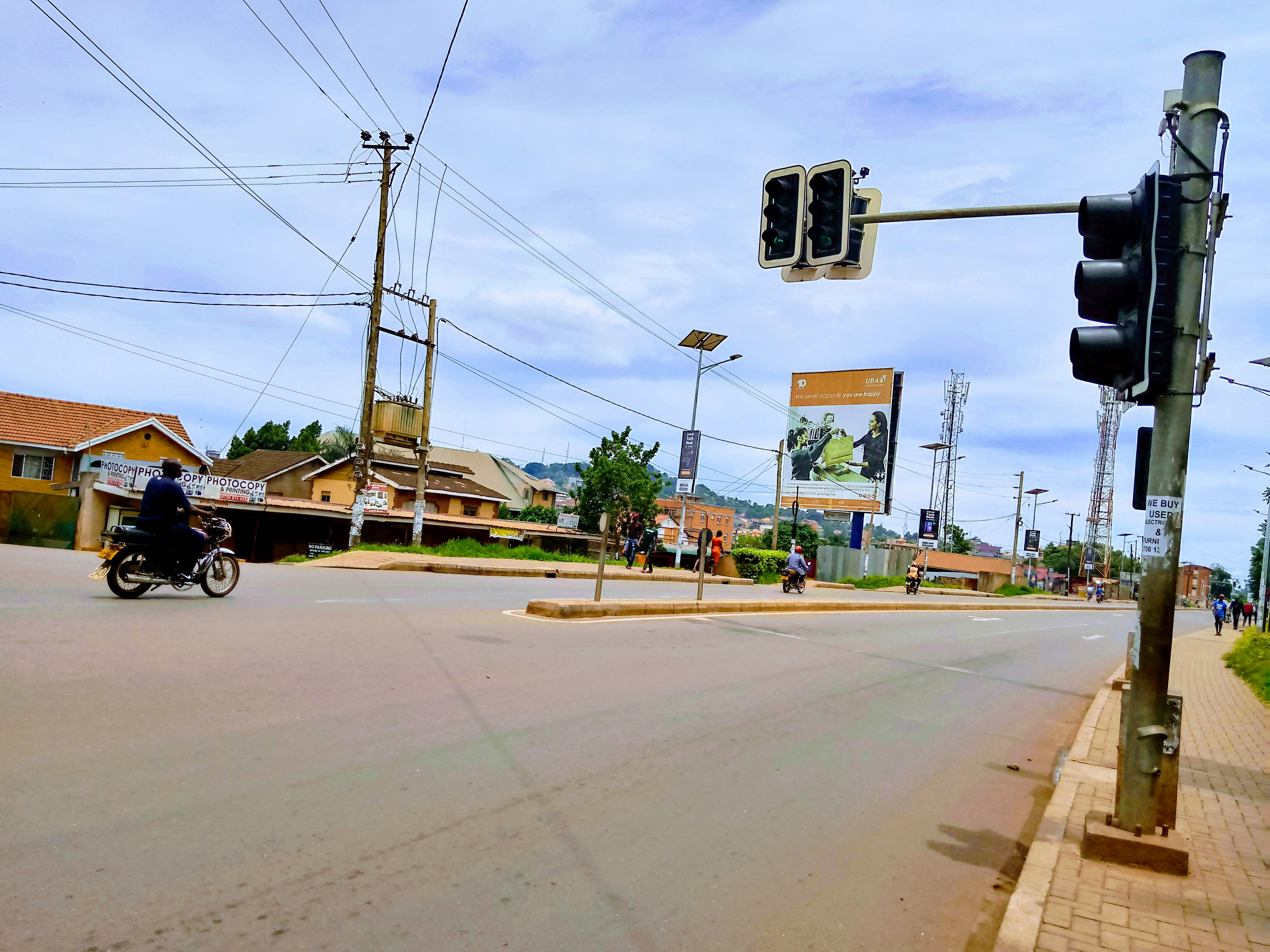
Empty Wandegeya road following the lockdown

As a precautionary measure, on 18 March, President Yoweri Museveni banned all incoming and outgoing travel to specified highly affected counties for a period of 32 days. Schools have been closed and public gatherings banned. The president extended the lock down period for another 21 days on top of the 14 days. This lock down period continued from 15 April and ran up to 5 May 2020.

He made the announcement on 5 May 2021, while addressing the nation on the status of coronavirus pandemic in Uganda.

Uganda re-entered a partial lockdown starting on 7 June 2021. A presidential directive banned travel between districts, restricted gatherings, and suspended schools and communal/religious gatherings for 42 days, in response to an uptick in community spread of the virus. People refusing to follow the new lockdown regulations would be fined instead of arrested.

==== Responses for businesses amid the outbreak ====
Up until 5 May 2020, most businesses had to remain closed. Food markets remained open, but many vendors were unable to return home and had to sleep in markets due to the suspension of public transport. A small number of businesses such as factories, garages, hardware shops, metalworks and restaurants for takeaway were allowed to reopen on 5 May, while others such as hair salons and business arcades remained closed until 27 July.

== Southern Africa ==
=== Namibia ===
On 17 March President Hage Geingob declared a state of emergency as a legal basis to restrict fundamental rights. The prohibition of large gatherings was clarified to apply to 50 or more people. Measures such as the closure of all borders, suspension of gatherings were implemented. All public and private schools were also closed for a month. By 14 April, a National lockdown was enforced to all regions in the country.

==== Access to information and surveillance ====
A COVID-19 communication hotline (0800100100) was established on 15 March 2020 which is run by the Ministry of Health and Social Services and the Centre for Disease Control of Namibia (CDC). The hotline serves to answer general enquiries of the public, assisting persons seeking guidance from the Ministry and reporting possible symptoms or cases of COVID-19.

The Government also announced on 18 March that it will strengthen their communication to the public via various platforms, such as the COVID-19 communication centre operated by NBC, in an attempt to "mitigate and refute misinformation, fear and panic especially from social media". The centre was fully functional by middle April 2020.

With the establishment of a multi-disciplinary Emergency Response team, the Ministry intensified their surveillance in monitoring the situation of COVID-19 in the country, especially at the borders of Namibia. The response team operates 24/7.

==== Testing ====
Before the confirmation of COVID-19 in Namibia, tests could not be done locally. Test samples were instead sent to South Africa, which accounted for longer than usual waiting times. Namibian Institute of Pathology (NIP) started testing locally in Windhoek at the end of March 2020. In late April, private laboratory company PathCare started testing samples. Namibia was hit by a lack of reagents at the end of April, which slowed down testing however, private testing at PathCare was expensive compared to that of the state (NIP) which offers free COVID-19 tests.

==== Economic stimulus package ====
An Emergency Income Grant was set up by government to distribute N$ 750 to every person whose income was affected by the pandemic or faced difficult conditions due to the lockdown. Over 800,000 people applied for this grant; 346,000 of them were paid by the end of April.

=== South Africa ===
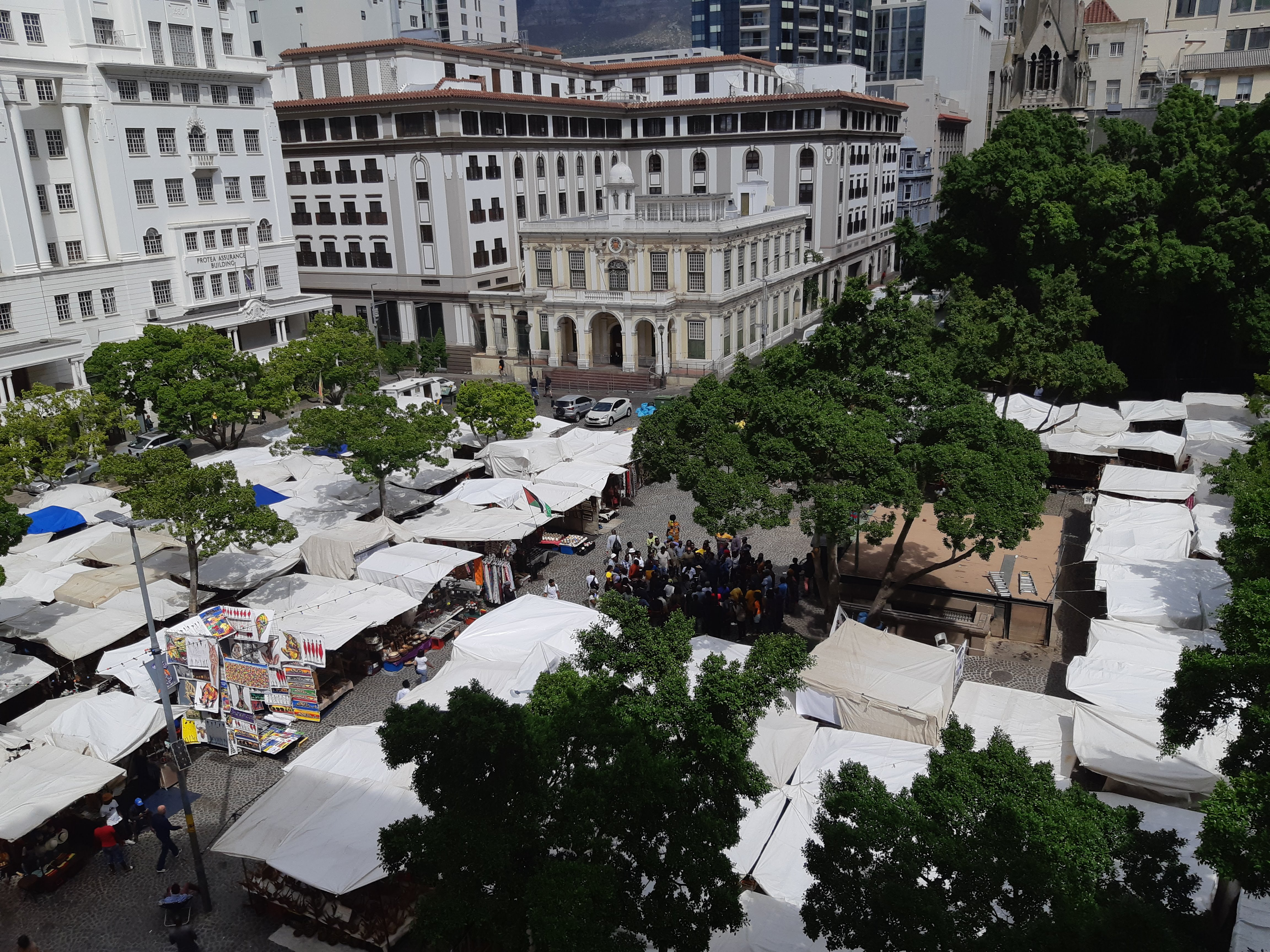
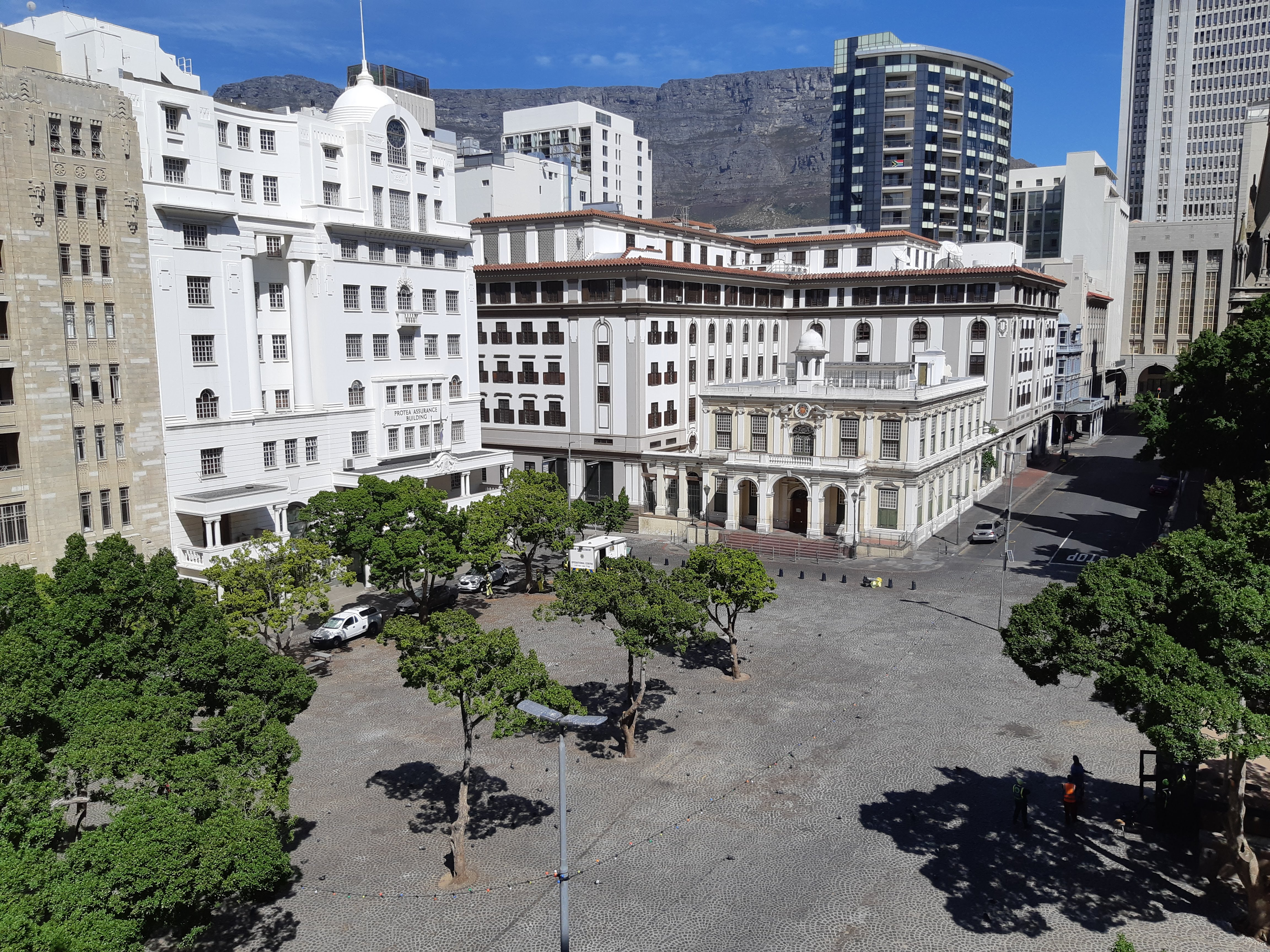
Greenmarket Square in Cape Town, South Africa seven days before (left) and on the first day (right) of the COVID-19 national lockdown. After the lockdown the market stall traders that normally setup on the square everyday are not present and only people exempt from the lockdown (security personnel and municipal employees) can be seen.

President Cyril Ramaphosa declared that South Africa would undergo a national lockdown, for a period of 21 days, from 26 March to 16 April 2020. This drastic measure was intended to help keep the viral infection rate as low as possible and save lives. On Thursday 9 April, President Ramaphosa announced an extension of two weeks to the lockdown, until the end of April. Exempt from the lockdown are people deemed necessary for the effective response to the pandemic such as health workers, pharmacy and laboratory personnel, emergency personnel, security services, supermarkets, transportation and logistical services, petrol stations, banks, essential financial as well as payment services and those working in industries that can affect the economy when shut down. This include mines and steel mills.

==== Testing ====
The National Institute for Communicable Diseases (NICD) started testing people in South Africa for SARS-CoV-2 on 28 January 2020, and by 7 February had conducted 42 of such tests. State hospitals were offering free COVID-19 testing by mid-March. On 30 March 2020, the government announced its intentions of initiating an enhanced screening and testing programme. By the start of April, 67 mobile testing units had been established and 47000 people had been tested, some in drive-through facilities. So far South Africa has been able to conduct almost 5 million tests with over 700 000 people testing positive.

==== Clinical trials, vaccines and treatment ====
On 17 March 2020, the South African Health Products Regulatory Authority announced that it would expedite review of treatments, vaccines and clinical trials. A team from 8 universities and 14 hospitals led by Helen Rees and Jeremy Nel from the University of the Witwatersrand participated in the World Health Organization Solidarity Clinical Trials that investigated medications. A COVID-19 vaccine trial was launched in Gauteng province, towards the end of June 2020 in collaboration with the Jenner Institute, University of Oxford and AstraZeneca. A second vaccine trial was launched during mid August 2020 in collaboration with a US Maryland based biotechnology company, Novavax, with funding from the Bill & Melinda Gates Foundation. A third vaccine trial was launched in September 2020 by Johnson & Johnson/Janssen.

== Prevention in other territories ==
=== British Indian Ocean Territory ===
As of 5 May there have been no cases in the British territory. Access to the islands, already heavily restricted due to the presence of a military base on Diego Garcia, have been further curtailed, with licenses for visiting vessels suspended.

All people arriving into the territory are subject to a 14-day quarantine; social distancing measures have also been enacted.

== Economic reliefs ==
As a financial response to the COVID-19 pandemic, Ghana initiated the Ghana COVID-19 Private Sector Fund which funded projects such as catering basic needs of Kayayei(head porters) amid the pandemic as well as the construction of the Ghana Infectious Disease Centre.

The government of Kenya implemented economic measures to reduce the impact of the COVID-19 pandemic. This included:

- 100% tax relief to Kenyans earning KSh 24,000 (US$228) and below.
- Pay as you earn (PAYE) reduction from a maximum of 30% to 25%.
- Reduction of turnover tax rate from 3% to 1% for all micro, small and medium enterprises.
- Reduction of resident income tax to 25%.
- Making available KSh 10 billion (US$95 million) to vulnerable groups including the elderly and orphans, among others.
- Temporary suspension of the listing of loan defaulters for of any person, micro, small and medium enterprise and corporate entities whose loan account is in arrears effective 1 April 2020.
- Reduction of VAT from 16% to 14% effective 1 April 2020.

In Nigeria, the Coalition Against COVID-19 was launched on 26 March 2020, following an announcement made by the Governor of the Central Bank of Nigeria, Godwin Emefiele. The purpose of the relief fund is to "support the Federal government of Nigeria in containing the COVID-19 pandemic in Nigeria; to ensure patients get the care they need and frontline workers get essential supplies and equipments; and to accelerate efforts to provide tests and treatments." Major companies, including Dangote Group, Access Bank and MTN have donated to the CACOVID Relief Fund, in addition to several private organizations and individuals.

On 15 March, King Mohammed VI announced the creation of an emergency fund (labelled as Fonds spécial pour la gestion de la pandémie du Coronavirus (Covid-19)) in order to upgrade health infrastructure and support the worst affected economic sectors as a result of the COVID-19 pandemic in Morocco. The fund has a volume of 10 billion dirham ($1 billion). Over 800,000 people applied for the stimulus grant as an economic response to the pandemic by the government of Namibia. 346,000 of them were paid by the end of April.

Economic responses in Mauritius included the Government implementation of a Self-Employed Assistance Scheme (SEAS) through the Mauritius Revenue Authority (MRA) on 31 March 2020 to assist self-employed persons who have suffered a loss of revenue as a consequence of the lockdown in the fight against COVID-19. Additional financial support was also provided to Micro, Small and Medium Enterprises.

== Reopening in some African countries ==
=== Ghana ===
On 19 April 2020, It was announced by the President of Ghana in his address to the nation that the partial lockdown that had been imposed three weeks earlier was lifted but the other preventive protocols were still in effect.

Stage one of the process of easing restrictions took effect on 5 June 2020. Religious services, funerals, weddings and other social gatherings were allowed but with reduced capacity and length.

On 18 November 2020, following the reopening of Ghana's economy, the Ghana CARES program was launched by Nana Akufo-Addo. The initiative is to serve as a 'blueprint' for the recovery of Ghana's economy post COVID-19.

=== South Africa ===
Easing of the national lockdown restrictions, based on a risk-adjusted strategy, started on 1 May 2020, becoming level 4.

COVID-19 risk-adjusted strategy for easing of lockdown restrictions
5					Drastic measures required to contain the spread of the virus to save lives.
5	4				Liquor ban: sale, dispensing, distribution, and transportation (except where alcohol is required for industries producing hand sanitizers, disinfectants, soap, alcohol for industrial use, household cleaning products, and liquor for export purposes). No special or events liquor licenses may be considered for approval. (26)
5	4				Tobacco sales ban: tobacco products, e-cigarettes, and related products. (27)
	4				Curfew from 20:00 until 05:00, except if granted a permit to perform an essential or permitted service, or is attending to a security or medical emergency. (16.3)
	4				Evictions, prohibition of: orders of eviction are stayed and suspended until level 4 ends, unless overridden by a court. (19)
	4				Movement: people may leave their place of residence to: perform an essential or permitted service, go to work if they have a permit, buy permitted goods, obtain permitted services, move children, as allowed, walk, run, or cycle between 06:00 and 09:00, within a 5 km of their place of residence. (16.1–2)
	4				Public transport: the Minister of Transport may allow the resumption of rail, bus services, taxi services; e-hailing services; and private vehicles, by setting out the hygiene conditions to limit exposure to COVID-19. (20)
	4				Movement between provinces, metropolitan municipalities, and district municipalities are prohibited except for workers with a permit to perform an essential or permitted service, attending funerals, transportation of mortal remains, and students of permitted schools or higher education institutions. (16.4) A once-off, one-way return to place of residence between 1 May 2020 to 7 May 2020, staying there until the end of level 4. (16.5)
	4				Closure of borders: except for designated ports of entry, and for the transportation of fuel, cargo, and goods. (21)
	4				Gatherings are banned, except for: funerals (limited to 50 people, but night vigils at funerals are banned (18.2–3); and movement between provinces, metropolitan municipalities, and district municipalities are allowed only for close family and partners with permits to do so. (18.1, 5)); when at a workplace; or; when buying or obtaining essential goods and services (23.1)
	4				Places closed to the public: where religious, cultural, sporting, entertainment, recreational, exhibitional, organisational, or similar activities are held; public parks, sports grounds and fields, beaches and swimming pools; flea markets; fêtes and bazaars; night clubs; casinos; hotels, lodges, bed and breakfasts, airbnbs', timeshare facilities and resorts, and guest houses, except where required for remaining tourists confined to hotels, lodges and guest houses; game reserves except where required for remaining confined tourists; holiday resorts except where required for remaining confined tourists; taverns and shebeens, or similar establishments; theatres and cinemas; and; museums (24.1–2); places that pose a risk to public of COVID-19. (24.4); Exceptions for those rendering security and maintenance services. (24.3)
	4				Sales allowed: food, cleaning, protective, babycare, stationery; winter clothing, bedding, heating; medical supplies; fuel, coal, wood, gas; hardware supplies for emergency home repairs and essential services by qualified tradespersons; components for vehicles for essential workers; chemicals, packaging, and supply of level 4 products.
	4	3			Facemasks: a cloth facemask, a homemade item, or another appropriate item that covers the nose and mouth, is mandatory when in public.
	4	3			Screening: public and at workplaces.
		3			Liquor ban: sale, dispensing, distribution, and transportation (except where alcohol is required for industries producing hand sanitizers, disinfectants, soap, alcohol for industrial use, household cleaning products, and liquor for export purposes or transport from manufacturing plants to storage facilities). No special or events liquor licenses may be considered for approval.
		3			Tobacco sales ban: tobacco products, e-cigarettes, and related products, except for export.
		3			Curfew from 21:00 until 04:00, except if granted a permit to perform an essential or permitted service, or is attending to a security or medical emergency.
		3			Evictions, prohibition of: orders of eviction are stayed and suspended until level 3 ends, unless overridden by a court.
		3			Movement: people may leave their place of residence to: perform an essential or permitted service, go to work if they have a permit, buy permitted goods, obtain permitted services, move children, as allowed, exercise between 06:00 and 18:00, provided it is not done in groups and adheres to health protocols and social distancing, attend a place of worship, provided it is within the same province, attend a school or learning institution.
		3			Movement of children between guardians or caregivers: permitted if in possession of a court order, a parenting plan, or a permit issued by a magistrate's court, provided the household is COVID-19 free.
		3			Movement between provinces is prohibited except for workers with a permit to perform an essential or permitted service, moving to a new place of residence or caring for an immediate family member and possessing the appropriate affidavit, members of parliament performing oversight responsibilities, students of permitted schools or higher education institutions, attending funerals, transportation of mortal remains, obtaining medical treatment, and people returning to their place of residence from a quarantine or isolation facility.
		3			Gatherings are banned, except for: attending faith-based institutions (limited to 50 people or less depending on the size of the place of worship.); an agricultural auction; a professional non-contact sports match (only players, match officials, journalists, and medical and television crew.); funerals (limited to 50 people, but night vigils at funerals are banned (18.2–3); and movement between provinces, metropolitan municipalities, and district municipalities are allowed only for close family and partners with permits to do so.); auctions; when at a workplace; or; when buying or obtaining essential goods and services.
		3			Places closed to the public: where religious, cultural, sporting, entertainment, recreational, exhibitional, organisational, or similar activities are held; gyms, fitness centres, sports grounds and fields, and swimming pools, except if training professional athletes and for hosting professional non-contact sports matches; fêtes and bazaars; night clubs; hotels, lodges, bed and breakfasts, timeshare facilities and resorts, and guest houses, except where required for remaining tourists confined to such facilities, and for persons in quarantine or isolation; bars, taverns and shebeens, or similar establishments; beaches and public parks, except for exercising; tourist attractions, except for private self-drive excursions; Exceptions for those rendering security and maintenance services.
		3			Closure of borders: except for designated ports of entry, for the transportation of fuel, cargo and goods, and for humanitarian operations, repatriations, evacuations, medical emergencies, movement of staff of diplomatic and international organisations, return of a South African national or permanent resident, and daily commuters.
		3			Public transport: the Minister of Transport may allow the resumption of rail, bus services, taxi services; e-hailing services; and private vehicles, by setting out the hygiene conditions to limit exposure to COVID-19.
		3			Domestic air travel is permitted except if for recreational, leisure, or tourism purposes.
		3			All businesses may operate, provided they follow hygiene protocols, have a COVID-19 plan and a compliance officer, except for: liquor and tobacco retailers; short-term home rental for leisure purposes (e.g. airbnbs); passenger ships for leisure purposes; and; entertainment activities.
		3			The following places and businesses may reopen to the public: personal care services, including hairdressing, barbering, facial treatments, makeup and nail salons, body massage, and piercing and tattoo parlours (from 19 June 2020); restaurants for 'sit-down' meals; accredited and licensed accommodation, except for home-sharing and airbnbs; conferences and meetings for business purposes; cinemas, theatres, libraries, museums, archives and galleries (from 6 July 2020); casinos; and; non-contact sports (e.g., golf, tennis, cricket) matches and training, and training for contact sports (from 6 July 2020);
			2		Further easing of restrictions, maintenance of social distancing.: All restrictions on inter-provincial travel will be lifted; Accommodation facilities will be permitted, in line with approved protocols; Restaurants, bars and taverns will be permitted to operate subject to regulations; Restrictions on the sale of tobacco will be lifted; Prohibition on the sale of alcohol will be lifted subject to restrictions. On-site consumption will be permitted until 22h00, while offsite consumption will be allowed from Monday to Thursday between 09h00 – 22h00.; Restrictions on family and social visits will be lifted, but caution is urged; Gyms and fitness centres can open, with approved protocols in place; The curfew will remain in place from 22h00 – 04h00; Gatherings of more than 50 people are still prohibited, as are sports events with spectators; International travel is still prohibited outside of the existing regulations
				1	Gathering capacity increased: 250 people allowed at indoor events; 500 people allowed at outdoor events; Physical exercise, recreation and entertainment venues allowed to operate at 50% capacity; Sports restrictions still as at Level 3; 100 people allowed at funerals; Travel restrictions eased: International travel will be eased in gradually as of 1 October; Limited number of countries can be visited based on their risk levels; Only OR Tambo, King Shaka, Cape Town International airports operational; A negative COVID-19 test result (no older than 72 hours) must be presented at airports; Mandatory quarantine for travellers who have no proof of testing for COVID-19; International tourists allowed to travel in but required to be screened first; All travelers required to use country's COVID-19 alert app; Other changes: Curfew remains in place, effective daily between midnight and 4am; Alcohol consumption permitted in licensed venues; Alcohol sales permitted from Monday to Friday between 9am and 5pm; The UIF relief benefit remains in place until end of the national state of disaster; All long-term visas will be reinstated

== See also ==
- National responses to the COVID-19 pandemic
- COVID-19 pandemic in Africa
- COVID-19 pandemic by country and territory
- SolaWash
