= Healthcare in South Africa =

In South Africa, private and public health systems exist in parallel. The public system serves the vast majority of the population. Authority and service delivery are divided between the national Department of Health, provincial health departments, and municipal health departments.

In 2017, South Africa spent 8.1% of GDP on health care, or US$499.2 per capita. Of that, approximately 42% was government expenditure. About 79% of doctors work in the private sector.

For the 2024/2025 fiscal year, the South African Government allocated R277 billion for health spending in its annual budget. It also announced its intent to increase healthcare spending to R329 billion by the 2027/28 fiscal year.

As of January 2026, major private healthcare companies in South Africa include Mediclinic Group (134 locations), Netcare (124 locations), Life Healthcare Group (63 locations), Lenmed (19 locations), Clinix Health Group (8 locations), and Melomed (6 locations).

Major private pathology (medical laboratory) companies in South Africa include Ampath, PathCare, and Lancet.

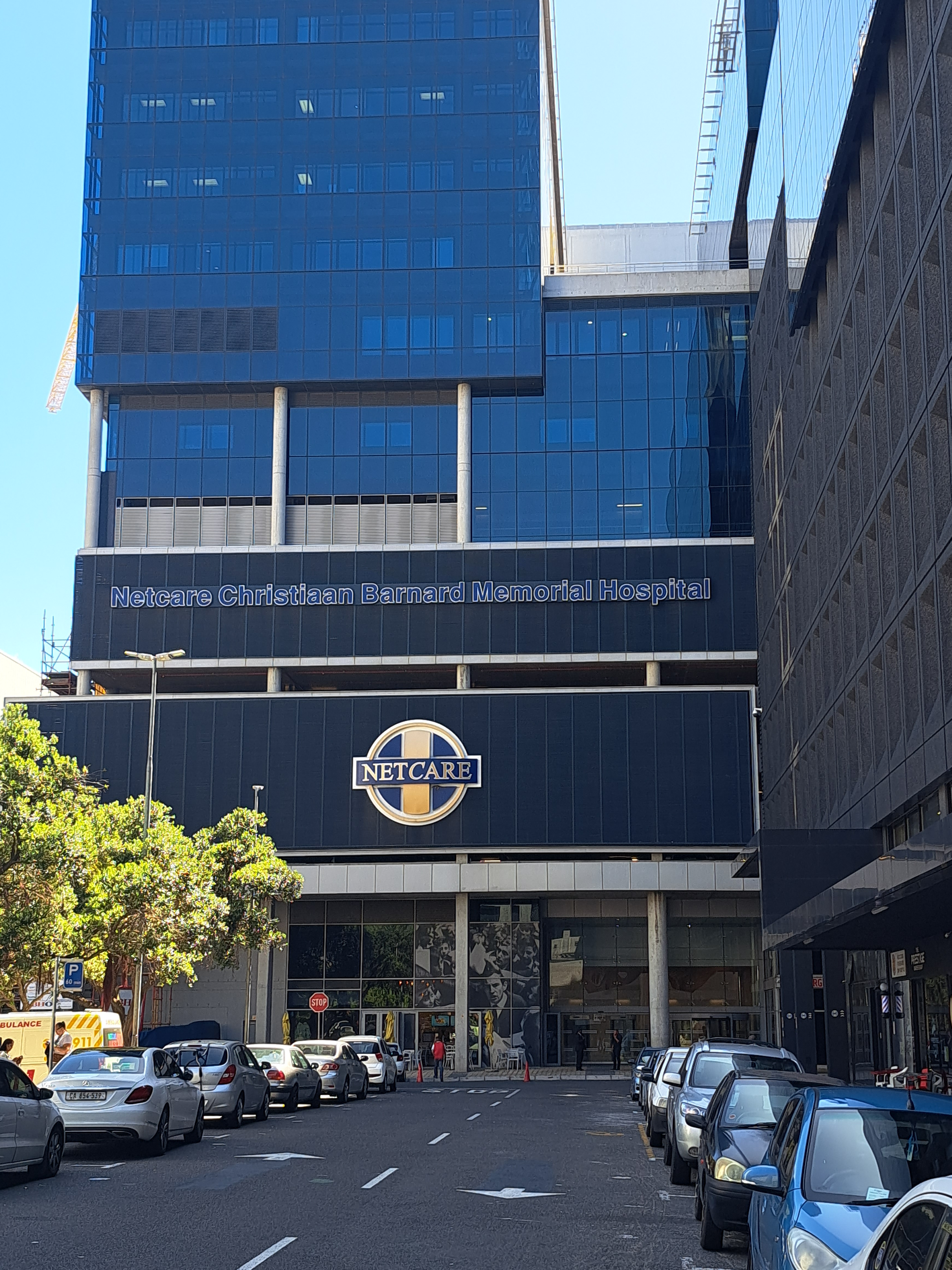
The private Netcare Christiaan Barnard Memorial Hospital in Cape Town CBD

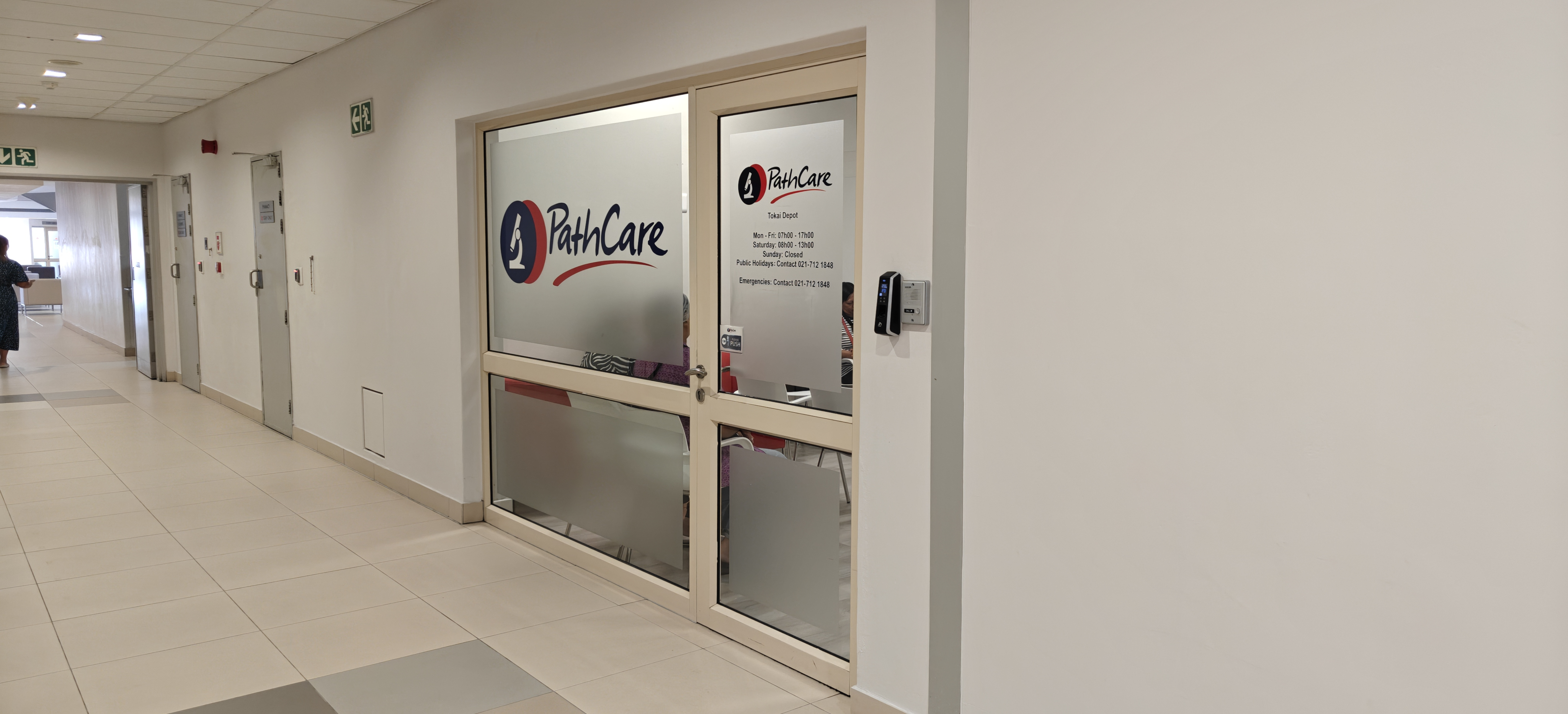
PathCare branch at Melomed Tokai Private Hospital in Tokai, Cape Town. PathCare is one of South Africa's major private pathology (medical laboratory) companies

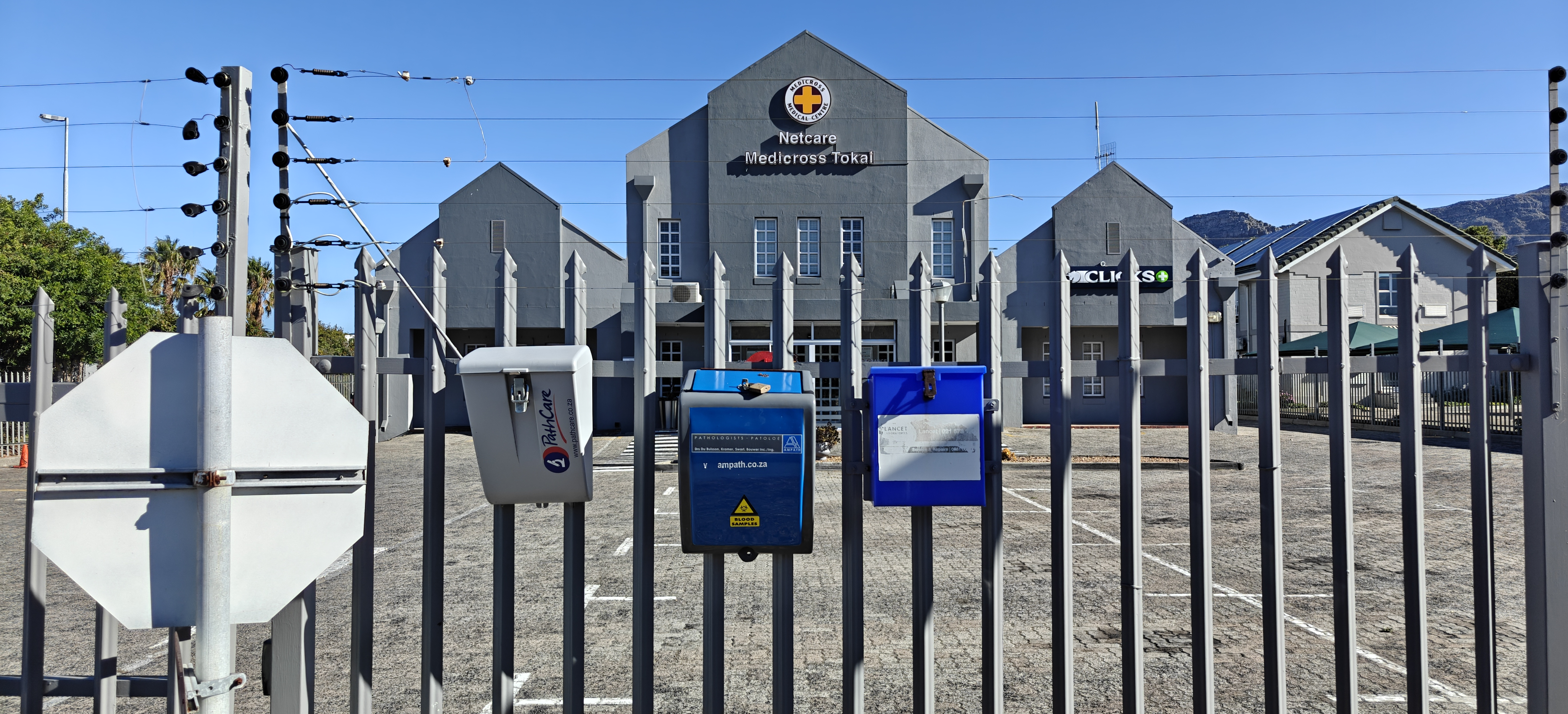
Private pathology company mailboxes outside Netcare Medicross Tokai private clinic, in Tokai, Cape Town

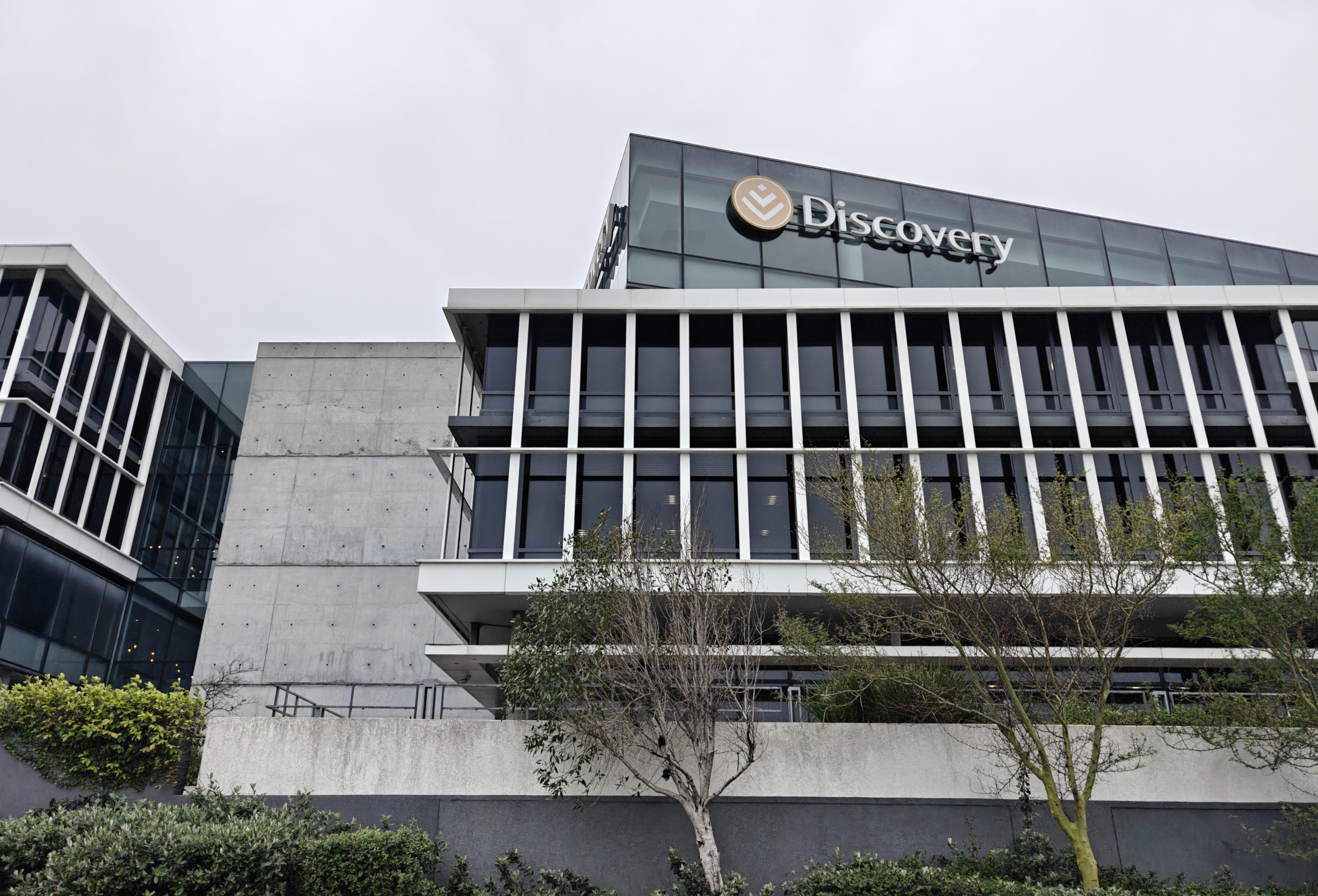
Discovery office in Century City, Cape Town. Discovery is South Africa's largest provider of private health insurance (medical aid), with 4.14 million members as of 2023

== History ==
The first hospital in South Africa, a temporary tent to care for sick sailors of the Dutch East India Company (the Company) afflicted by diseases such as typhoid and scurvy, was started at the Cape of Good Hope in 1652.

A permanent hospital was completed in 1656. Initially, convalescent soldiers provided to others whatever care they could, but around 1700 the first Binnenmoeder (Dutch for matron) and Siekenvader (male nurse/supervisor) were appointed in order to ensure cleanliness in the hospital, and to supervise bedside attendants.

The Company subsequently employed Sworn Midwives from Holland, who practiced midwifery and also trained and examined local women who wished to become midwives. Some of the early trainees at the Cape were freed Malay and coloured slaves.

From 1807, other hospitals were built in order to meet the increasing demand for healthcare. The first hospitals in the Eastern Cape were founded in Port Elizabeth, King Williamstown, Grahamstown and Queenstown.

=== Missionary hospitals ===
Roman Catholic Nuns of the Assumption Order were the first members of a religious order to arrive in South Africa. In 1874, two Nightingale nurses, Anglican Sisterhoods, the Community of St Michael and All Angels arrived from England.

The discovery of diamonds in Kimberley led to an explosion of immigrants, which, coupled with the "generally squalid conditions" around mines, encouraged the spread of diseases dysentery, typhoid, and malaria.

Following negotiations with the Anglican Order of St Michael, Sister Henrietta Stockdale and other members were assigned to the Carnarvon hospital in 1877. Sister Stockdale had studied nursing and taught the nurses at Carnavorn what she knew; these nurses would move to other hospitals in Barbeton, Pretoria, Queenstown, and Cape Town, where they in turn trained others in nursing. This laid the foundation of professional nursing in South Africa.

Sister Stockdale was also responsible for the nursing clauses in the Cape of Good Hope Medical and Pharmacy Act of 1891, the world's first regulations requiring state registration of nurses.

After South Africa left the British Commonwealth of Nations, the government nationalised the missionary hospitals that had served the poor.

=== 20th-century nursing ===
The Anglo-Boer war and World War 1 severely strained healthcare provision in South Africa.

Formal training for black nurses began at Lovedale in 1902. In the first half of the 20th century, nursing was not considered appropriate for Indian women but some males did become registered nurses or orderlies.

In 1912, the South African military recognised the importance of military nursing in the Defence Act. In 1913, the first nursing journal, The South African Nursing Record, was published. In 1914, The South African Trained Nurses' Association, the first organisation for nurses, formed. In 1944, the first Nursing Act was promulgated.

In 1935, the first diploma courses to enable nurses to train as tutors were introduced at the University of Witwatersrand and the University of Cape Town.

The establishment of independent states and homelands in South Africa also created independent Nursing Councils, and Nursing Associations for the Transkei, Bophuthatswana, Venda, and Ciskei. Under the post-Apartheid dispensation, these were all merged to form one organisation, the Democratic Nursing Organisation of South Africa (DENOSA).

=== Healthcare provision in the post-war period ===
Following the end of the Second World War, South Africa saw a rapid growth in the coverage of private medical provision, with this development mainly benefiting the predominantly middle class white population. From 1945 to 1960, the percentage of whites covered by health insurance grew from 48% to 80% of the population. Virtually the entire white population had shifted away from the free health services provided by the government by 1960, with 95% of non-whites remaining reliant upon the public sector for treatment.

Membership of health insurance schemes became effectively compulsory for white South Africans due to membership of such schemes being a condition of employment, together with the fact that virtually all whites were formally employed. Pensioner members of many health insurance schemes received the same medical benefits as other members of these schemes, but free of costs.

Since coming to power in 1994, the African National Congress (ANC) has implemented a number of measures to combat health inequalities in South Africa. These have included the introduction of free health care in 1994 for all children under the age of six together with pregnant and breastfeeding women making use of public sector health facilities (extended to all those using primary level public sector health care services in 1996) and the extension of free hospital care (in 2003) to children older than six with moderate and severe disabilities.

== Health infrastructure ==
=== Staffing ===
In 2013, it was estimated that vacancy rates for doctors were 56% and for nurses 46%. Half the population lives in rural areas, but only 3% of newly qualified doctors take jobs there. All medical training takes place in the public sector but 70% of doctors go into the private sector. 10% of medical staff are qualified in other countries. Medical student numbers increased by 34% between 2000 and 2012.

Public sector people-to-doctor and people-to-nurse ratio by province, 2015
Province	People-to-doctor ratio	People-to-nurse ratio	priv. sec. People-to-doctor ratio	priv. sec. People-to-nurse ratio
Eastern Cape	4,280 to 1	673 to 1		
Free State	5,228 to 1	1,198 to 1		
Gauteng	4,024 to 1	1,042 to 1		
KwaZulu Natal	3,195 to 1	665 to 1		
Limpopo	4,478 to 1	612 to 1		
Mpumalanga	5,124 to 1	825 to 1		
North West	5,500 to 1	855 to 1		
Northern Cape	2,738 to 1	869 to 1		
Western Cape	3,967 to 1	180 to 1		
South Africa	4,024 to 1	807 to 1	330 to 1	160 to 1

==== Online databases of healthcare providers ====
- Health Professions Councils of South Africa (HPCSA): Official registration body for medical professionals.
- South African Pharmacy Council (SAPC): Official registration body for pharmacists and pharmacies.
- South African Nursing Council (SANC): Official registration body for nurses. (Note that their eRegister requires an SA ID number or SANC registration number.)
- Medpages: Healthcare providers by category and region. Search allows finding of providers by name or specialty.
- South African government master facility list of primary health care facilities in the public health sector

=== Hospitals ===
There are more than 400 public hospitals and more than 200 private hospitals. The provincial health departments manage the larger regional hospitals directly. Smaller hospitals and primary care clinics are managed at district level. The national Department of Health manages the 10 major teaching hospitals directly.

The Chris Hani Baragwanath Hospital in Johannesburg is the third-largest hospital in the world.

Breakdown of hospitals and clinics in South Africa in 2014
Province	Public clinic	Public hospital	Private clinic	Private hospital	Total
Eastern Cape	731	91	44	17	883
Free State	212	34	22	13	281
Gauteng	333	39	286	83	741
KwaZulu-Natal	592	77	95	12	776
Limpopo	456	42	14	10	522
Mpumalanga	242	33	23	13	311
North West	273	22	17	14	326
Northern Cape	131	16	10	2	159
Western Cape	212	53	170	39	474
Total	3,863	407	610	203	5,083

Total number of hospital beds in South Africa in 2014
Province	Public hospital beds	Private hospitals beds	Total hospital beds
Eastern Cape	13,200	1,723	14,923
Free State	4,798	2,337	7,135
Gauteng	16,656	14,278	30,934
KwaZulu-Natal	22,048	4,514	26,562
Limpopo	7,745	600	8,345
Mpumalanga	4,745	1,252	5,997
North West	5,132	1,685	6,817
Northern Cape	1,523	293	1,816
Western Cape	12,241	4,385	16,626
South Africa	85,362	31,067	119,155

== Pharmaceuticals ==
The technology of automated teller machines has been developed into pharmacy dispensing units, which have been installed in six sites (as of November 2018) and dispense chronic medication for illnesses such as HIV, hypertension, and diabetes for patients who do not need to see a clinician.

== Payment systems ==
=== Uniform Patient Fee Schedule ===
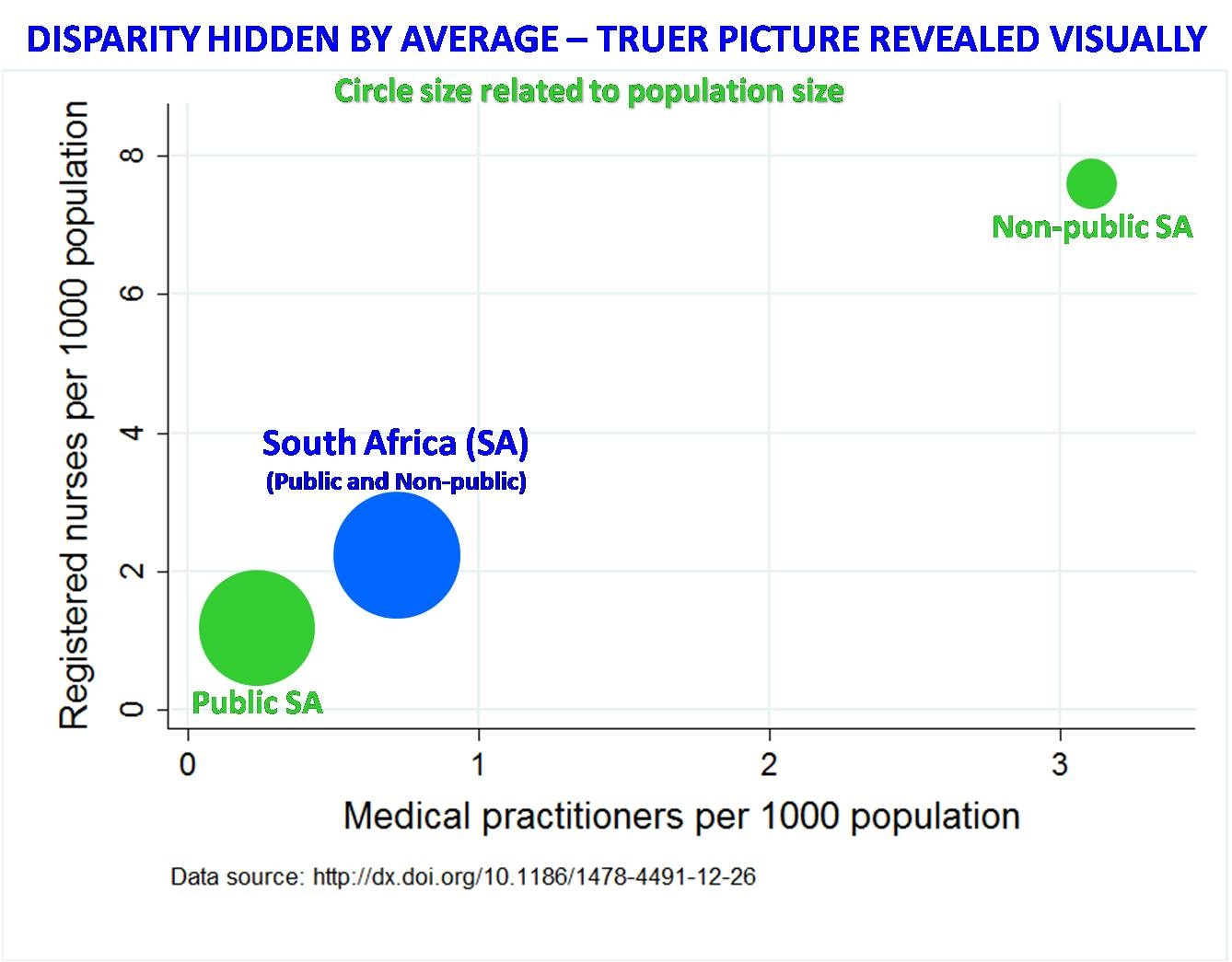
Nurses and medical practitioners per 1000 people in the public and nonpublic sector.

The public sector uses a Uniform Patient Fee Schedule (UPFS) as a guide to billing for services. This is being used in all the provinces of South Africa, although in Western Cape, Kwa-Zulu Natal, and Eastern Cape, it is being implemented on a phased schedule. Implemented in November 2000, the UPFS categorises the different fees for every type of patient and situation.

It groups patients into three categories defined in general terms, and includes a classification system for placing all patients into either one of these categories depending on the situation and any other relevant variables. The three categories include full paying patients—patients who are either being treated by a private practitioner, who are externally funded, or who are some types of non-South African citizens—, fully subsidised patients—patients who are referred to a hospital by Primary Healthcare Services—, and partially subsidised patients—patients whose costs are partially covered based on their income. There are also specified occasions in which services are free of cost.

=== Private health insurance ===
Paying for private health insurance is common in South Africa, among those who can afford it. Some companies pay for health insurance, either in part or in full, as an employment benefit. It is quite common for individuals to pay for their own health insurance, with a provider of their choice.

The private health insurance market is competitive, with numerous major corporations offering a variety of packages. Generally, a main member will join, and then add dependent members to their plan at a slightly lower cost per member (such as their spouse or children).

Major health insurance companies include Discovery (the country's largest by total membership), Momentum, GEMS, FedHealth, BestMed, and MedShield.

=== National Health Insurance ===
The current government is working to establish a national health insurance (NHI) system out of concerns for discrepancies within the national healthcare system, such as unequal access to healthcare amongst different socio-economic groups. Although the details and outline of the proposal have yet to be released, it seeks to find ways to make health care more available to those who currently cannot afford it or whose situation prevents them from attaining the services they need.

There is a discrepancy between money spent in the private sector which serves the wealthy (about US$1,500 per head per year), and that spent in the public sector (about US$150 per head per year), which serves about 84% of the population. About 16% of the population have private health insurance. The total public funding for healthcare in 2019 was R222.6 billion (broken down to R98.2bn for District Health Services, R43.1bn for Central hospital services, R36.7bn for Provincial hospital services, R35.6bn for other health services, and R8.8bn for facilities management & maintenance). The NHI scheme is expected to require expenditure of around R336 billion.

It is speculated that the NHI will propose that there be a single National Health Insurance Fund (NHIF) for health insurance. This fund is expected to draw its revenue from general taxes and some sort of health insurance contribution. The proposed fund is supposed to work as a way to purchase and provide health care to all South African residents without detracting from other social services. Those receiving healthcare from both the public and private sectors will be mandated to contribute through taxes to the NHIF. The ANC hopes that the NHI plan will work to pay for healthcare costs for those who cannot pay for it themselves.

There are those who doubt the NHI and oppose its fundamental techniques. For example, many believe that the NHI will put a burden on the upper class to pay for all lower class health care. Currently, the vast majority of healthcare funds comes from individual contributions coming from upper class patients paying directly for healthcare in the private sector. The NHI proposes that healthcare fund revenues be shifted from these individual contributions to a general tax revenue.

Because the NHI aims to provide free healthcare to all South Africans, the new system is expected to bring an end to the financial burden facing public sector patients.

On 15 May 2024, South African President Cyril Ramaphosa signed the National Health Insurance bill.

== Refugees and asylum seekers ==
The South African Constitution guarantees everyone "access to health care services" and states that "no one may be refused emergency medical treatment." Hence, all South African residents, including refugees and asylum seekers, are entitled to access to health care services.

A Department of Health directive stated that all refugees and asylum seekers – without the need for a permit or a South African identity document – should have access to free anti-retroviral treatment at all public health care providers.

The Refugee Act entitles migrants to full legal protection under the Bill of Rights as well as the same basic health care services which inhabitants of South Africa receive.

Although infectious diseases "as prescribed from time to time" does bar entry, grant of temporary and permanent residence permits according to the Immigration Act, this does not include an infection with HIV and therefore migrants cannot be declined entry or medical treatment based on their HIV status.

== Treatment ==
=== HIV/AIDS antiretroviral treatment ===
Life expectancy in some AIDS-ravaged African countries from 1960 to 2012

Because of its abundant cases of HIV/AIDS among citizens (about 5.6 million in 2009) South Africa has been working to create a program to distribute anti-retroviral therapy treatment, which has generally been limited in poorer countries, including neighboring country Lesotho. An anti-retroviral drug aims to control the amount of virus in the patient's body. In November 2003 the Operational Plan for Comprehensive HIV and AIDS Care, Management and Treatment for South Africa was approved, which was soon accompanied by a National Strategic Plan for 2007–2011. When South Africa freed itself of apartheid, the new health care policy has emphasised public health care, which is founded with primary health care. The National Strategic Plan therefore promotes distribution of anti-retroviral therapy through the public sector, and more specifically, primary health care.

According to the World Health Organization, about 37% of infected individuals were receiving treatment at the end of 2009. It was not until 2009 that the South African National AIDS Council urged the government to raise the treatment threshold to be within the World Health Organisation guidelines. Although this is the case, the latest anti-retroviral treatment guideline, released in February 2010, continue to fall short of these recommendations. In the beginning of 2010, the government promised to treat all HIV-positive children with anti-retroviral therapy, though throughout the year, there have been studies that show the lack of treatment for children among many hospitals. In 2009, a bit over 50% of children in need of anti-retroviral therapy were receiving it. Because the World Health Organisation's 2010 guidelines suggest that HIV-positive patients need to start receiving treatment earlier than they have been, only 37% of those considered in need of anti-retroviral therapy are receiving it.

A controversy within the distribution of anti-retroviral treatment is the use of generic drugs. When an effective anti-retroviral drug became in available in 1996, only economically rich countries could afford it at a price of $10,000 to $15,000 per person per year. For economically disadvantaged countries, such as South Africa, to begin using and distributing the drug, the price had to be lowered substantially. In 2000, generic anti-retroviral treatments started being produced and sold at a much cheaper cost. Needing to compete with these prices, the big-brand pharmaceutical companies were forced to lower their prices. This competition has greatly benefited low economic countries and the prices have continued decline since the generic drug was introduced. The anti-retroviral treatment can now be purchased at as low as eighty-eight dollars per person per year. While the production of generic drugs has allowed the treatment of many more people in need, pharmaceutical companies feel that the combination of a decrease in price and a decrease in customers reduces the money they can spend on researching and developing new medications and treatments for HIV/AIDS.

== See also ==
- Health in South Africa
- Emergency medical services in South Africa
- Medical education in South Africa
  - List of medical schools in South Africa
- South African Department of Health
- South African Malaria Initiative
- South African Medical Research Council
- South African Military Health Service
- Disability in South Africa
- Health Disparities in South Africa
