= Health disparities in South Africa =

Bias health services in South Africa yields social disparities

The gap in socioeconomic status between racial groups in South Africa has been a key contributor to health disparities, with White South Africans, a minority group, having overall better health outcomes than majority Black South Africans. White South Africans, a minority group, have overall better access and health outcomes than other racial groups in South Africa. Black and Colored South Africans, have poorer overall health outcomes and are disproportionately unable to access the private healthcare system in South Africa.

== Socioeconomic status in South Africa ==
Socioeconomic status is a measure of economic and social standing of an individual or group. and an underlying contributor to health inequities within populations and a predictor of health outcomes. Key factors of socioeconomic status are education, household income, employment status, and material resources. Groups with higher socioeconomic status often have better health outcomes due to their ability to pay for treatment on their own, improving overall access to quality healthcare. Meanwhile, lower socioeconomic status groups often have worse health outcomes due to poor access to quality healthcare and financial inability to pay for healthcare. In 2020, South Africa's GINI coefficient was 62.73, the highest of any country, indicating a high-level of income inequality.

The top 20% of South Africa's population holds 70% of all income earned by the country, with this group consisting mainly of White South Africans. Considering Black South Africans constitute 76% of the population, with White South Africans at 9%, Colored South Africans at 9%, and Indian South Africans at 2%; White South Africans often have higher socioeconomic status compared to larger minority groups. White South Africans also have generally better health than other racial groups in South Africa. Health inequalities by socioeconomic status also follow racial lines, with Black South Africans having significantly lower educational attainment, household income, employment rates, and material resources compared to all other major racial groups in South Africa.

== Geographic health disparities ==
Differences in geographic location can impact access to quality healthcare. Healthcare professionals are mainly concentrated in urban centers, which leaves rural areas underserved. In rural areas, health centers are often understaffed, have low levels of supplies, and cannot perform the same procedures as other health centers located in urban areas. In South Africa, 44% of the population, which live in rural areas, are only served by 12% of the country's physicians. Individuals in urban areas live, on average, 2 km away from the nearest health clinic, while those in rural areas are in excess of 5 km away. Individuals who live further from clinics cited the monetary and time costs it takes to travel to health centers as significant barriers to seeking care. This further exacerbates negative health outcomes considering the poorest income quintiles in South Africa live the farthest from health facilities and are likely to reside in rural provinces.

== Racial and ethnic health disparities ==
Racial and ethnic health disparities continue to persist between the five largest racial groups in South Africa's post-Apartheid era. Research from 2018 on South Africans ages 50 years or older indicated that Black South Africans have disproportionately poorer cognitive functioning. Coloured South Africans also have a disproportionate levels of hypertension, arthritis, strokes, and vision compared to other racial groups. Asian and White South Africans self-reported higher levels of health status and diabetes. The observed health outcomes by racial group, mirror findings from studies on racial groups in the United States. Socioeconomic factors also posed as deterrents to Black and Coloured South Africans seeking medical care. Over 40% of Blacks and 23% of Coloured reported skipping routine medical care due to these factors, compared to only 11% of Whites and 7% of Asians. Black South Africans are underrepresented in blood donations, leading to potential phenotype disparity. Research shows that prosocial motivation (altruism) and promotional communication are motivators for Black donors and fear, lack of awareness, and perceived racial discrimination in blood collection are deterrents.

In addition, Black and Coloured communities in South Africa's urban cities have predominately worse infrastructure, environmental safety, and higher rates of crime; a legacy of Apartheid. Research has shown that poorer living conditions can be a contributing factor to worse health outcomes.

== Government initiatives to combat health disparities ==
=== National Insurance Program ===
In 2012, the South African government passed the National Health Insurance Bill. The goal of the bill was to provide access to healthcare for all South Africans through the establishment of the National Health Insurance Program, a universal health insurance system funded by the public. This program sought to eliminate barriers to health insurance due to socioeconomic status and remove disparities between the current two-tiered health system. Between 1996 and 2006, the difference between individual health expenditure in the private sector and public sector doubled. By 2016, individuals who had private health insurance spent over three times as much as those with public health insurance. Currently, only 16% of the population uses the private sector health system, while the public sector health system accounts for the remaining 84% of the population. Black Africans mainly use the public sector healthcare system, being 75% of all public sector healthcare users.

=== HIV counseling and testing campaign ===
According to the World Bank, in 2020, 19.1% of South Africans ages 15–49 were HIV positive. This is the highest prevalence rate of any country. To reduce the spread of HIV and increase overall testing in South Africa, the government established the HIV Counseling and Testing Campaign in 2010. Prior to the program, over 500,000 patients were provided anti-retroviral treatment for HIV. In 2013, the program provided over 600,000 participants anti-retroviral treatment. Furthermore, the program increased the number of nurses trained to give anti-retroviral treatment from 250 to 10,500 over a period of two years. A 2012 study of the program found that patients in the HIV counseling and testing campaign were more likely to disclose their HIV status to others, helping raise awareness and reduce the spread of HIV. The program also saw testing increase among young, Black males.

== See also ==
- Healthcare in South Africa
- Health in South Africa
- HIV/AIDS in South Africa
- Health Equity
