= Health in South Africa =

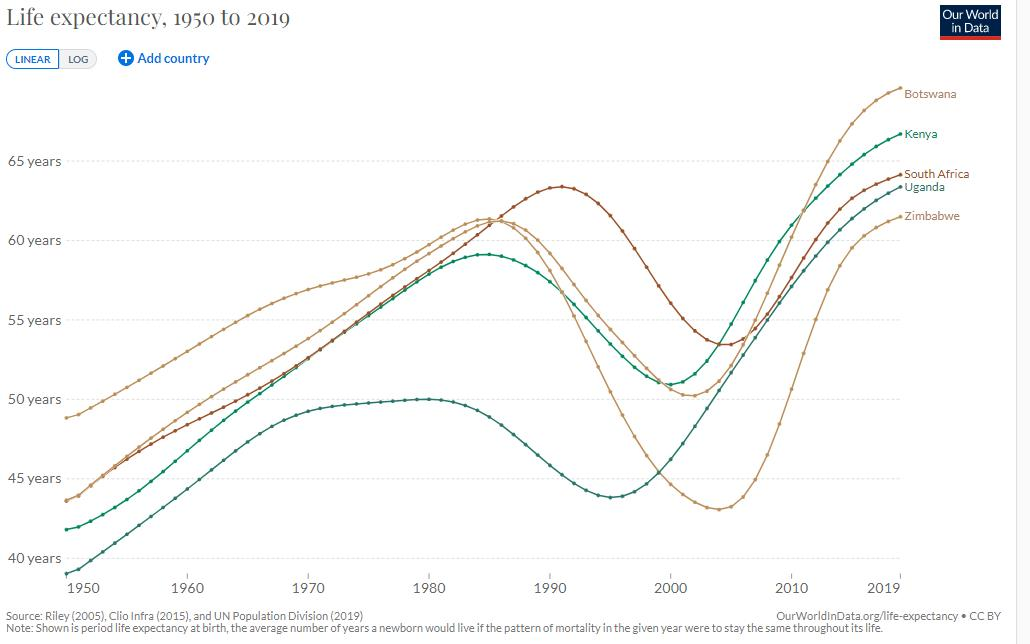
Life expectancy in select Southern African countries, 1950–2019. HIV/AIDS has caused a fall in life expectancy.

Health in South Africa touches on various aspects of health including the infectious diseases (such as HIV/AIDS), Nutrition, Mental Health and Maternal care.

The Human Rights Measurement Initiative finds that South Africa is fulfilling 73.4% of what it should be fulfilling for the right to health based on its level of income. When looking at the right to health with respect to children, South Africa achieves 89.1% of what is expected based on its current income.

In regards to the right to health amongst the adult population, the country achieves only 63.8% of what is expected based on the nation's level of income. South Africa falls into the "very bad" category when evaluating the right to reproductive health because the nation is fulfilling only 67.2% of what the nation is expected to achieve based on the resources (income) it has available.

== Life expectancy ==
In 2015, CIA estimated the average life expectancy in South Africa to be 62.34 years. The life expectancy for males is 60.83 years and for females 63.87 years.

== HIV/AIDS ==
Estimated HIV infection in Africa in 2007 shows high rates of infection in Southern Africa.

HIV (human immunodeficiency virus) is the retrovirus that causes the disease known as AIDS (Acquired Immunodeficiency Syndrome).

South Africa has the highest number of people living with HIV globally, with approximately 7.8 million affected as of 2025, including around 270,000 children under 14. Despite longstanding progress in treatment and prevention, recent cuts to United States foreign aid, specifically funding from the President’s Emergency Plan for AIDS Relief (PEPFAR), have jeopardized critical support services. These cuts, initiated during Donald Trump’s presidency and expanded in 2025, affected community-based initiatives that provided HIV testing, psychosocial care, nutritional support, and education.

In 2024, PEPFAR accounted for about 22% of South Africa’s $2.56 billion HIV budget. The loss of this funding has led to the closure of programmes run by NGOs like Crystal Fountain and the Greater Rape Intervention Programme (GRIP), reducing access to medication delivery, food aid, and counselling; especially for women and children.

Health Minister Aaron Motsoaledi has stated that antiretroviral (ARV) treatment will remain available through state procurement and the Global Fund. However, experts warn that without sustained support services, HIV-related deaths, already at 50,000 annually, may increase. UNAIDS and the Desmond Tutu HIV Centre caution that halts in prevention and research efforts could result in hundreds of thousands of additional deaths over the next decade.

== Other infectious diseases ==
Other infectious diseases prevalent in South Africa include bacterial diarrhea, typhoid fever, and hepatitis A. These infectious diseases are generally caused when the food or water consumed by an individual has been exposed to fecal material. South Africa is an underdeveloped nation and because of this the sanitation facility access in urban areas is 16% unimproved while in rural areas the sanitation facility access is 35% unimproved.

== Vaccination and blood donation ==
The South African Vaccination and Immunisation Centre began in 2003 as an alliance between the South African Department of Health, vaccine industry, academic institutions, and other stakeholders. It works with WHO and the South African National Department of Health to educate, do research, provide technical support, and advocate. They work to increase rates of vaccination in order to improve the nation's health.

Black South Africans are underrepresented in blood donations, which has health consequences such as phenotype disparity. Qualitative research showed that motivators indicated by Black donors were prosocial reasons and promotional communication, and deterrents included fear, lack of awareness, and perceived racial discrimination in blood collection.

== Malnutrition ==
15% of South African infants are born with a low birth weight. 5% of South African children are so underweight they are considered to be wasted. Since the 1990s South Africa's malnutrition problem has remained fairly stable. But as malnutrition in terms of hunger is getting better, the number of obesity is rising and this is becoming a problem.

The prevalence of malnutrition in South Africa varies across different geographical areas and socio-economic groups. Many infants in Africa have malnutrition because their mothers do not breastfeed them. The reason mothers in South Africa avoid breastfeeding is to prevent passing on AIDS to their children. The 2010 South Africa Department of Health Study found that 30.2% of pregnant women in South Africa have AIDS. Instead, mothers give milk substitutes to their children and do so in unclean environments. Sometimes they go directly to giving food which are not adapted to infants. These things cause many cases of malnutrition in children under five years of age.

== Undernourishment ==
South Africa has less than 5% of the population facing undernourishment. In 2015, South Africa achieved one of the targets of the millennium development goal 1 which was to halve the number of people facing undernourishment between 1990 and 2015.

== Mental health ==
In a study conducted by the Mental Health and Poverty Research Program, it was found that approximately 16.5% of the adult population in South Africa has mental illness, with 1% suffering from a severe life-debilitating mental disease. 30% of South Africans are likely to suffer a mental illness in their lifetimes, depression being the most common ailment. A recent study found that 44.1% and 40.2% of youth (ages 14–24 years) experienced depression and anxiety, respectively. Furthermore, 1 in 4 of these youth reported current suicidal thoughts.

Bloomberg has ranked South Africa as the second "most stressed out" country in the world, due in large part to South Africans' work ethic. 53% of the South African work force does not take annual leave.

Another large contributor to the high frequency of mental disorders is violence. Of the adult population ages 16 to 64, it was found that 23% were exposed to a traumatic event of violence in the past year. These traumatic events include acts such as fighting a war, being tortured, or participating in violence. Among this population, it was determined that mental illness including symptoms of posttraumatic stress disorder (PTSD) was 8.5 times more prevalent than among the general population.

Another factor contributing to mental illness in South Africa is substance abuse. Many provinces are used as drug trafficking routes, and as the South African government lacks the necessary resources to control this problem, many of these illicit drugs find their way into local populations as a drug. It was found that 52% of street children smoke the Cannabis plant and 22% on a daily basis. Educational campaigns are limited, and as a result, many do not realize the impinging health effects that will result from substance abuse.

Diseases such as malaria, typhoid fever, and HIV provide a significant contribution to the prevalence of mental illness. Some of these diseases such as cerebral malaria can bear a direct physiological effect on the mental functionality of the patient. However, even more poignant is the ability of the disease to strike a radiating blow to the patient's emotional psyche. For instance, the prevalence of mental illness among those suffering from HIV is 43.7% compared to the 16.5% observed among the general population.

== Maternal and child healthcare ==
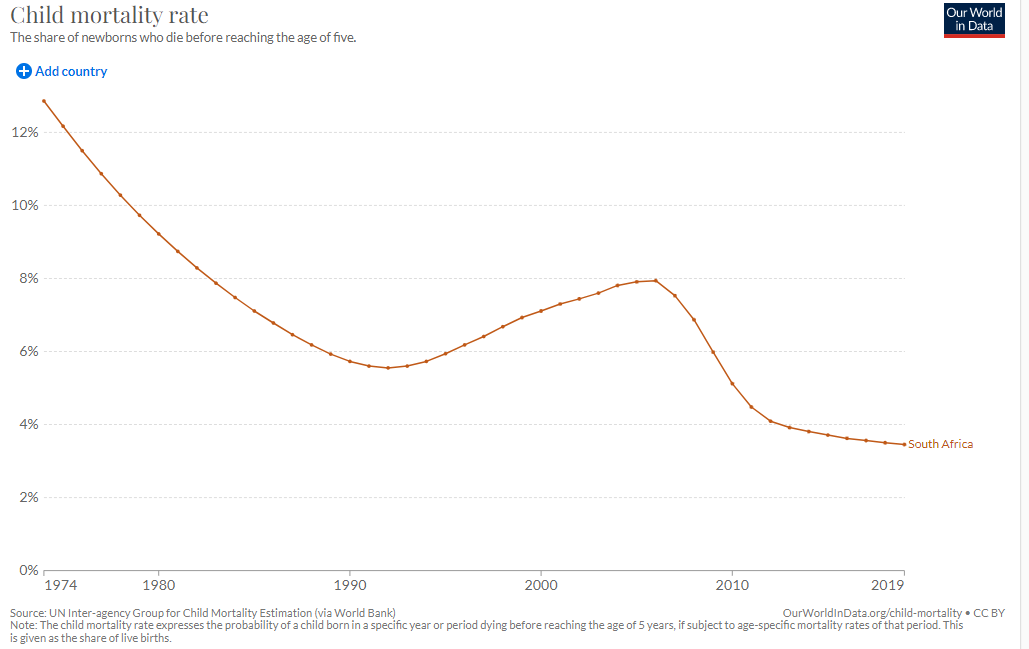
Development of child mortality in South Africa since 1960

The 2010 maternal mortality rate per 100,000 births for South Africa is 410. This is compared with 236.8 in 2008 and 120.7 in 1990. The under 5 mortality rate, per 1,000 births is 65 and the neonatal mortality as a percentage of under 5's mortality is 30. In South Africa the number of midwives per 1,000 live births is unavailable and the lifetime risk of death for pregnant women 1 in 100.

== Effects of climate change ==
There is evidence that climate change will have negative impacts on public health in South Africa, especially due to the high proportion of vulnerable people. There is already a high burden of disease in South Africa linked to environmental stressors and climate change will exacerbate many of these social and environmental issues. Climate change is projected to threaten public health through increased heat stress, rises in vector-borne diseases and infectious diseases, worsening extreme weather events, a decline in food security, and increased mental health stress. A 2019 survey of literature on adaptation and public health, found that "the volume and quality of research is disappointing, and disproportionate to the threat posed by climate change in South Africa.".

== See also ==
- Health Disparities in South Africa
- Healthcare in South Africa
- Timeline of healthcare in South Africa
- COVID-19 pandemic in South Africa
