= PathCare =

South African pathology and diagnostic services group

- Type: Privately-held group
- Industry: Healthcare
- Founded: 1922; 104 years ago
- Headquarters: Cape Town, South Africa
- Area served: South Africa; Namibia; Lesotho
- Services: Pathology diagnostic services
- Owner: Partners of the practice
- Subsidiaries: Dietrich Voigt Mia Pty Limited; Dr WJH Vermaak Incorporated
- Website: pathcare.co.za

PathCare is a South African pathology and diagnostic services group. It exists through a partnership of pathologists in private practice, principally operating as Drs Dietrich, Voigt, Mia & Partners.

Founded in 1922 and headquartered in Cape Town, PathCare is one of Southern Africa's largest pathology practices, operating a network of laboratories and diagnostic facilities in South Africa, Namibia, and Lesotho.

As of 2026, PathCare operates multiple laboratories, including a reference laboratory in Cape Town, a main laboratory in Gauteng, and numerous peripheral and hospital laboratories. The company also operates over 160 pathology depots across Southern Africa.

PathCare's main competitors in South Africa include Ampath and Lancet, the country's other two major private pathology groups.

== History ==
PathCare was founded in 1922, with the opening of South Africa's first private pathology laboratory, from which the modern PathCare organisation subsequently developed.

In 2003, PathCare expanded outside of South Africa for the first time, through an investment in Kenya.

In 2005, the company further expanded internationally, through an investment in Nigeria.

In 2006, PathCare established the PathCare Academy for Training and Development, which trains laboratory and other professionals.

In 2016, PathCare acquired shares in Vermaak and Partners, a Gauteng-based pathology practice founded by chemical pathologists Hayward Vermaak and Job Ubbink. The transaction expanded PathCare's presence in the province and brought the practices together under joint control.

In 2019, PathCare and Vermaak amalgamated their laboratories, leading to the establishment of PathCare Vermaak.

In December 2021, PathCare reached a settlement agreement with the South African Competition Commission, under which it agreed to reduce the price of its COVID-19 polymerase chain reaction (PCR) tests from approximately R850 to no more than R500, including VAT.

In 2023, PathCare marked 100 years since the opening of the first private pathology laboratory in South Africa, from which the modern organization developed.

== Operations ==
As of 2026, PathCare operates around 160 pathology depots across Southern Africa. Of these, the majority are located in South Africa, with additional sites in Namibia and Kenya.

== See also ==
- Healthcare in South Africa
