= Ghana Infectious Disease Centre =

Disease Control Centre

Ghana Infectious Disease Centre (GIDC) is a centre built to improve the medical diagnostic and research capacity of Ghana with regard to infectious diseases. The facility was built due to the emergence of the COVID-19 pandemic in Ghana. Establishing the centre was facilitated by the Ghana COVID-19 Private Sector Fund in collaboration with the Ghana Armed Forces at the Ga East Municipal Hospital in Accra. The old Shai Osudoku District Hospital was also renovated into one of the infectious diseases centres in the Shai Osudoku District in Dodowa. This shares a boundary with the Shai Osudoku District Health Directorate. The president, Nana Addo Dankwa Akuffo Addo, inspected the centre on 30 October 2020

== History ==
Ghana Infectious Disease Centre was commissioned by Vice-president Mahamudu Bawumia on 24 July 2020. He stated a sum of US$7.5 million was used to launch the centre. It was established as Ghana's leading national public health institute.

== Organisation ==
According to Mahamudu Bawumia, "The world-class 100-bed facility was constructed by a team of 536 men and women working 24 hours a day. Persons who worked tirelessly to build the centre in a bid to support government's fight and management of COVID-19 in Ghana."
