= South African Malaria Initiative =

South African Malaria Initiative Logo

The South African Malaria Initiative (SAMI) was established to facilitate the integration of malaria research and related capacity building in South Africa and the rest of Africa.

Through SAMI a virtual expertise network of malaria researchers was established to more effectively address the problem of malaria.

The South African Department of Science and Technology committed 11,5 million ZAR over a period of two and a half years to support collaborative research programmes in SAMI.

The Mission of the South African Malaria Initiative is to facilitate an integrated programme of malaria research and capacity development in South Africa and eventually in the rest of Africa to improve malaria prevention and control. Modern research tools will be applied to malaria research. Outputs will include the identification and validation of drug and insecticidal targets, development of drug and insecticidal candidates, improved diagnostics, and new tools for gathering epidemiological information.
