= Ghana COVID-19 Private Sector Fund =

Fund

Ghana COVID-19 Private Sector Fund is an initiative by the Government of Ghana (GOG) to help fight the novel corona virus pandemic. The fund was established by ten businessmen and women to raise GHC 100,000 to support the effort of the government by providing intervention to support the public who have been hard hit by the COVID-19 pandemic in Ghana either economically, socially and politically.

== Projects ==
=== Feed - A- Kayayo ===
This project was established to support Kayayei (head porters) with food and accommodation during the lockdown period in other to curb wide spread of the corona virus. This was done to cater for 8000 head porters of which 6000 were in Accra and 2000 were in Kumasi. The duration of the intervention was from 1 April 2020 to 12 April 2020. There was an extension of the support. The project was led by Julie Essiam the Commission at GRA.

=== Ghana Infectious Disease Centre ===
The Ghana Infectious Disease Centre was built because the country did not have an infectious disease centre, so there was a need to build on through the use of the COVID-19 fund. On 21 August, the Ghana COVID-19 Private Sector Fund received GHS6.8 million from the Ghana COVID-19 National Trust Fund to contribute to the construction of the Ghana Infectious Disease Centre.

== See also ==
- COVID-19 pandemic in Ghana
- Ghana Infectious Disease Centre
