= Timeline of the COVID-19 pandemic in Ghana (August–December 2020) =

The following is a timeline of the COVID-19 pandemic in Ghana from August 2020 to December 2020.

== Timeline ==
=== August 2020 ===
- Model-based simulations for Ghana indicate that the 95% confidence interval for the time-varying reproduction number R_{t} was stable below 1.0 in August.
- On 1 August, face shields were reported to have gained acceptance as protection against COVID-19, rather than the use of face masks, as they were claimed to be more comfortable when worn for long hours.
- On 2 August, the FDA claimed a hand sanitizer was safe for use and it does not contain acid after a viral video said it contains acid. UG and a transport company partnered to use chlorine disinfectant in the fight against COVID-19.
- On 3 August, GSS claimed the COVID-19 pandemic had an impact on Ghanaian businesses and especially during the partial lock down.
- On 4 August, a media production company started to show an animated video series to create awareness on coronavirus safety measures. The ECG claimed about 1.7 million electricity consumers would benefit from the government's COVID-19 relief. A foundation donated assorted food items and PPE's to a family home on Winneba.
- On 5 August, the MP and MCE of Ablekuma West and the CEO of an organization to carry out education on COVID-19 to the public. They donated some items within the constituency. A company donated some PPE's to the MoH in the fight against COVID-19. The president claimed COVID-19 pandemic would not delay the completion of the Tema-Mpakadan Rail Project.
- On 6 August, a rapper in Ghana claimed even though COVID-19 has caused disappointments in 2020, he was looking forward to a more robust music industry in the country.
- On 7 August, GCB Bank approved GH¢100,000.00, an amount meant to be donated in aid to fight against COVID-19 and CMS in the Upper West region of Ghana. The executives of NASPA of Accra Metropolis distributed face masks on a two-day distribution exercise in parts of Greater region of Ghana.
- On 8 August, there was a report concerning COVID-19 outbreaks when students are back to school.
- On 9 August, the leader of Risk Communication for COVID-19 National response team claimed Ghana is making progress against the coronavirus battle because of certain measures the Government put in place.
- On 10 August, three NGO's organized COVID-19 sensitization for some communities in the Ashanti, Eastern and Volta regions in Ghana. An investigation revealed some staff of a hospital in Accra sold vital PPE's for personal gain as the country faced some shortages during the pandemic. An association donated PPE's to NMIMR which was valued at GHC 150,000.
- On 11 August, PPE sellers association raised concerns about the price fall of face shields because of the influx of lower versions. It was reported there was no case at the CCTH as all cases have been treated.
- On 12 August, GHS claimed four out of the 16 regions in Ghana did not have active cases of COVID-19. GHS collaborated with a company to develop a location-intelligence platform for reporting and sharing information on COVID-19 in the country.
- On 13 August, the second lady of Ghana encouraged the youth to develop ways to mitigate the impact of COVID-19 disease in Ghana.
- On 14 August, the Ghana Association of Medical Laboratory Scientists asked the FDA to review the current criteria for the validation of RDT's for the virus in Ghana.
- On 16 August, Ghana's UNFPA Representative claimed COVID-19 pandemic has doubled the plight of the 'black girl'. The president claimed there is the need to be able to test every entrant into Ghana by air before the borders of Ghana are reopened. He also claimed none of the testing centers of COVID-19 had backlog of samples to be tested. He also pleaded with Ghanaians to wear the nose masks well to help fight against the pandemic. Some universities, technical universities and colleges claimed they are to return to school to complete the academic year.
- On 17 August, a group donated food items and toiletries to three orphanages to mitigate their plight during the COVID-19 pandemic. South Korea supported the COVID-19 response team of Ghana with medical supplies. The GHS claimed it would engage stakeholders to ensure entrants into Ghana are tested for COVID-19. The MFWA for West Africa called for financial relief packages for media such as tax breaks during COVID-19 pandemic.
- On 18 August, Zipline received commendations for supporting Ghana's fight against COVID-19 pandemic. UNICEF donated health equipment and accessories to the Greater Accra Regional Health Directorate for distribution. NCCE encouraged the public to prioritize personal safety to curb COVID-19. Head of State Award Scheme in Ghana donated masks to two institutions.
- On 19 August, the Head of Reproductive and Child Health of the GHS claimed nursing mothers who tested positive for the virus can still breastfeed their babies.
- On 20 August, a 10-member committee was inaugurated by the Minister of Education to advise and deliberate on re-opening of schools. Lions Clubs in the country donated PPEs to a hospital and police station in Akuse. KoKMA advised the chiefs and people of Osu to celebrate Homowo festival whiles observing the COVID-19 protocols.
- On 21 August, an events company fed people in Kumasi because of the implications of COVID-19.
- On 22 August, the World Bank claimed COVID-19 could force 100million global citizens into 'extreme' poverty.
- On 23 August, IATA released an airline self assessment health checklist to support ICAO take-off.
- On 24 August, it was claimed COVID-19 cases in Africa began falling in certain most hit countries. An organization distributed face masks to some religious bodies in the Hohoe Municipality.
- On 25 August, Lufthansa announced it was preparing to distribute COVID-19 vaccines.
- On 26 August, it was reported that a large number of Ghanaians were not adhering to the safety protocols meant to prevent the spread of the virus. The NCCE intensified its mass sensitization and education campaign on COVID-19 to the streets.
- On 27 August, UNICEF Ghana and the World Vision Ghana donated PPE's to the Ministry of Sanitation and Water Resources in the support on the fight against coronavirus. Water Aid Ghana collaborated with DFID UK and also Unilever, donated hands-free washing facilities to some government agencies in the country. Ministry of Finance in Ghana and the EU donated PPEs to the Ministry of Education and some NGOs to be distributed to some schools in the fight against COVID-19.
- On 28 August, the director of health promotion at GHS cautioned Ghanaians who have lowered the adherence to the COVID-19 safety protocols. GPRTU urged drivers to adhere to the COVID-19 safety protocols.
- On 29 August, an NGO called for the protection of children who use online activities due to the advent of COVID-19. The US Ambassador to Ghana donated PPEs to GHS.
- On 30 August, an organization donated PPEs to two orphanages. KsTU donated some samples of foot-operated hand-washing machine the school built to KMA and other institutions to fight against COVID-19. The task force in Greater Accra Metropolitan Area claimed it is challenged in its effort to enforce the wearing of face masks directive and that the lack of adherence to this directive might cause a rise of COVID-19 cases in Ghana.
- On 31 August, the MoH claimed Ghana has put in place enough measures to detect possible COVID-19 cases at KIA. The president Nana Akufo-Addo in his address to the nation announced that all nursery, kindergarten, primary, JHS 1, SHS 1 students have had the rest of their academic year postponed til January 2021. According to the director of the GHS, children under the five years, air crew and passengers on transit would not undergo testing for COVID-19 at KIA. Travelers that arrive Ghana by air were expected to pay US$150 for COVID-19 test as part of measures to control the spread of the virus in Ghana.

=== September 2020 ===
- Model-based simulations indicate that the 95% confidence interval for the time-varying reproduction number R_{t} was stable below 1.0 in September.
- On 1 September, the Deputy Health Minister justified the $150 fee that was charged for COVID-19 testing at the KIA. The CEO of a travel agency advised the government about the admission of people from high-risk COVID-19 countries into the country. An association urged the government to ensure there was timely supply of PPEs to SHS students.
- On 2 September, the NSS claimed all service personnel who were posted to educational institutions that remained closed because of the COVID-19 would still be paid their allowances in full. The FDA dispelled claims by a virologist at the NMIMR that the corona virus testing device that was used at the KIA was not reliable. About 200 passengers on three flights at the KIA successfully passed the COVID-19 tests on the first day of the reopening of the airport. A group claimed the $150 imposed by government as fees for COVID-19 test on travelers who arrived in Ghana was a violation of health regulations.
- On 3 September, the GHS announced there was no positive COVID-19 case among passengers who arrived at KIA. NMIMR claimed its assessment of COVID-19 testing process at the KIA has guaranteed it was highly appropriate and reliable. The GES and GHS jointly issued a guideline on how students can go home after their WASSCE exams. An organization partnered with GHS to launch an electronic version of Health Declaration Form to obtain travelers history and signs and symptoms for COVID-19.
- On 4 September, the NMIMR disassociated itself from the comment of one of its staff on the COVID-19 testing system at KIA. A lecturer at KNUST urged Ghanaians to tread cautiously to avoid a spike of COVID-19 active cases after restrictions were eased.
- On 5 September, GTA in collaboration with GACL held a sensitization workshop for tour operators and others after KIA was reopened. GHS and an institution organized a COVID-19 Children's quiz at the headquarters of Health Promotion Division.
- On 6 September, the Deputy Health Minister justified the reason the government opted for antigen test to prevent the importation of COVID-19 in Ghana. The CSO of Ghana distributed face masks and Information Education Communication materials to the less privileged.
- On 7 September, the Deputy Health Minister claimed Ghana recorded six new COVID-19 cases at the KIA after the airport was reopened. The CEO of Vodafone joined leaders in Africa to speak on the economic recovery of the continent after COVID-19. The GHS and others organized a day workshop for the Volta Regional House of Chiefs to sensitize them on the corona virus protocols and other ailments. The Education Minister was claimed to have been worried concerning what he called the "digital divide" amid attempts to digitize education in the country after COVID-19 disrupted schooling.
- On 8 September, the Minister for Information appealed to traditional authorities to help upscale public education to prevent the spread of the virus in the communities. The GIS claimed it had begun the issuance of Emergency Entry Visa after Ghana's airport was reopened. A company donated foodstuffs to the Kumasi South Hospital in the fight against corona virus at the facility.
- On 9 September, the office of MTN in the South West donated about 6000 KN95 nose masks to two hospitals in the Western region. The GWCL claimed landlords and others who sell water to consumers can be arrested and prosecuted after it was announced by the government it is free.
- On 10 September, 67 travelers at the KIA who arrived were claimed to have been detained after failing to go through the compulsory COVID-19 test. An organization delivered about 15,000 masks to some needy groups. Two companies made donation of 100,000 medical face masks to support the fight against COVID-19. UNDP in Ghana suggested the need to reduce inter costs in the country to support businesses due to the impact of COVID-19.
- On 11 September, some staff of COVID-19 burial team in Ghana called on the government to make provisions of relief packages promised to them. An MP demanded the scrapping of Executive Instrument 63 which was claimed to compel network operators in providing private user information to state agencies in the fight against COVID-19.
- On 12 September, the MFA claimed over 9,000 Ghanaians and those who hold resident permit all over the world were brought back to the country during the border closure due to COVID-19. Zoomlion extended its disinfection exercise to the Northern and North East regions. 13 airlines were said to have resumed flights after KIA was reopened.
- On 13 September, the MFA claimed it has ended the evacuation of Ghanaians who were stranded abroad due to the COVID-19 restrictions. A former CEO of BOST claimed difficulties in doing business in the country is not the outbreak of COVID-19 alone.
- On 14 September, travelers by air to Ghana were required to make online payments for the COVID-19 test at KIA before boarding flights. A former president of Ghana claimed thousands of people gather to meet politicians on campaign grounds even though there were restrictions due to COVID-19. The Executive Director of NBSSI claimed there was an approval for the disbursement of stimulus packages to over 1,000 private schools in the country. PPEs were delivered to candidates of the 2020 BECE in the various regions for distribution.
- On 15 September, candidates of 2020 BECE across the country adhered to the COVID-19 safety protocols. The GACL deferred the implementation of the "No Payment, No Entry" policy for all travelers arriving into Ghana. A group in the UK donated PPEs to the Ho Teaching Hospital in the fight against corona virus. Increase in prices of goods was attributed to the closure of the country's land borders to contain the virus.
- On 16 September, it was confirmed 16 travelers at the KIA tested positive for COVID-19 after it was reopened. It was reported the Ghana currency performed better than a number of other currencies across Africa during COVID-19 pandemic. Private Tertiary Institutions were advised to adopt diversification of income so that they can be financially sustainable during the pandemic. A foundation donated face masks and other items to some basic schools in Tema. Over 4,000 face masks were donated to the Ghana Prisons Service for protecting inmates against the virus.
- On 17 September, it was reported China handed over the second batch of medical supplies to Ghana against COVID-19 pandemic. A union of nurses and midwives appealed to the government to extend the incentives front lined health workers enjoyed in the fight against COVID-19. ATU partnered with Coursera to support students with over 3,800 courses as it was an initiative of Coursera's Coronavirus Response.
- On 18 September, the Deputy Minister of Health commended health workers in the management of COVID-19 and their dedication to duty. The Deputy Minister also urged health institutions to be active when dealing with matters of health and avoid discrimination by some health workers to patients. The Information Minister urged Ghanaians must keep observing the COVID-19 protocols in spite of the reduction in active cases. The Employment Minister claimed Ghana's employment rate reduced by 3.5%.
- On 19 September, the vice president of Ghana claimed the country enhanced her reputation worldwide as a result of adopting innovative approaches in the management of COVID-19. According to the Information Minister, COVID-19 pandemic has clouded Ghana's economic gains and a setback to eradication efforts of poverty in the country. It was reported the effects of COVID-19 pandemic triggered 'Operation feed Yourself'.
- On 20 September, it was reported Ghana's COVID-19 cases reduced to 499. It was announced 14 new COVID-19 cases were recorded at KIA. A pastor urged his church members not to undermine COVID-19 protocols. The president addressed Ghanaians on COVID-19 on measures to fight the virus.
- On 21 September, the GHS and others organized a workshop to sensitize the Central regional house of chiefs on the virus and others. The president claimed the decision of government to test passengers for COVID-19 at KIA has paid off. The president also warned Ghanaians not to underestimate the COVID-19 pandemic. The President claimed 16 airlines were operational after borders of Ghana were opened to international air traffic.
- On 22 September, nurses and midwives went on strike and patients were left stranded in hospitals. GHS appealed to nurses who went on strike to go back to work for the sake of Ghana's fight against COVID-19. Stanbic bank in partnership with UNOPS donated COVID-19 tests kits to GHS. The Australian High Commissioner in Ghana urged his staff to abide by all COVID-19 protocols set by Ghanaian authorities.
- On 23 September, the MoE with GES collaborated with Zoomlion to disinfect SHS across Ghana. The nurses and midwives called off their strike action. The President called out countries who claimed to have developed COVID-19 vaccines to make it available to all. Over 3700 schools were disinfected in the Greater Accra to pave way for the reopening of schools. The GACL announced there will be a fine on airlines who fly travelers who do not possess PCR tests or those with positive PCR tests at KIA. MPA launched a campaign to provide a million PPEs for health workers to fight COVID-19.
- On 24 September, some members of Ghana's COVID-19 burial team showed their frustration after they were exempted from government's relief package for front line workers. Zoomlion disinfected about 70 schools in the Western North and Western regions ahead of reopening of schools. The World Bank approved an amount of US$125 million for improving of water supply and sanitation to communities in Accra and Kumasi.
- On 25 September, more than 200,000 businesses received some funds disbursed by the NBSSI to cushion them from the impact of COVID-19. It was reported many Ghanaians ignored the advice of wearing face masks and also adhering to the safety protocols of COVID-19. Zoomlion disinfected about 140 SHS in the Eastern region.
- On 26 September, a medical facility from Germany donated hospital materials worth about 30,000 euros to Nandom Hospital in the Upper West region. Nyaho Medical Center donated a new vehicle to Ayawaso West Health Directorate to be used for delivery of services in the fight against COVID-19. It was reported there was fraud at KIA over COVID-19 test.
- On 27 September, it was reported that according to a study, a new COVID-19 mutation has appeared to be more contagious and this new virus can defeat face masks and the COVID-19 protocols.
- On 28 September, it was claimed COVID-19 and other factors caused the halt of the Tono Irrigation Project in the Upper East region. PWDs appealed to the government to make COVID-19 interventions and responses to its members. A policeman who tested positive for the virus and recovered became an ambassador for educating people and speaking up against stigmatization.
- On 29 September, the 37 Military Hospital received donations of items from staff of GAF and the Regular Career Course. The Executive Director of National Cardiothoracic Centre claimed COVID-19 had affected patients refusal to use the facility because of fear of contracting the disease. An NGO claimed the impacts of COVID-19 would affect response to HIV/AIDS and other diseases in the country and other African nations. The Vice President claimed COVID-19 afforded an opportunity to set up policies that are intended to encourage the expansion of local industries and imports reduction. Ghanaians were urged not to relent on observing the COVID-19 protocols.
- On 30 September, the Audit Service claimed the delay in submitting and publishing of reports for 2019 Financial year was due to COVID-19 and the lock down. Zoomlion disinfected about 823 schools in the Upper West Region. In a survey by GSS, communities along Ghana's borders experienced the worst economic shocks from the pandemic.

=== October 2020 ===
- Model-based simulations indicate that the 95% confidence interval for the time-varying reproduction number R_{t} was stable below 1.0 in October.
- On 1 October, the minority in parliament demanded the suspension of the bond between the government and a company for testing COVID-19 at KIA. The GSS claimed there was more criminal activities during the 3-week lock down due to COVID-19. The Senior Minister said that the use of technology to conduct business in both sectors has come to stay.
- On 2 October, a charity organization warned the COVID-19 pandemic could cause a spike in child marriages in some parts of the world. The Minister for Communication claimed COVID-19 pandemic demonstrated a rise in dependency on technology globally. The Information Minister said the COVID-19 tests at KIA should be celebrated and not attacked. It was reported the pandemic took toll on every part of the economy both locally and internationally. A writer appealed to government to completely lift the ban on religious gatherings.
- On 3 October, some parents commended the government for the reopening of schools amid the pandemic. The NCCE warned Ghanaians to continue to adhere the COVID-19 protocols. The GES, GHS, CSO and other stakeholders in some districts in the Upper East region embarked on a project to help in the fight against COVID-19. The Embassy of Brazil in Ghana donated ventilators to the MoH for COVID-19 patients.
- On 4 October, the GES told all second year students of SHS and JHS to go to school whilst observing COVID-19 protocols. According to the CEO of Airbus, the aviation industry's outlook further deteriorated because of the rise in COVID-19 infections and renewed travel restrictions. A ladies football club purchased a bus with the money they received from the FIFA Coronavirus Relief Funds. A pastor advised Ghanaians to keep adhering to the COVID-19 protocols and not be complacent.
- On 5 October, students in SHS and JHS returned to school. The Ghana Taekwondo Federation claimed they were to show their strategies and plans on how to deal with COVID-19 to the National Sports Authority in case they start their activities. National Association of Graduate Teachers warned it did not want to see a renewed wave of coronavirus infections in the country. A Member of Parliament showed his displeasure over non-compliance of COVID-19 protocols by some Ghanaians.
- On 6 October, the Minister for Works and Housing claimed COVID-19 worsened the country's housing deficit. According to the US CDC, COVID-19 is airborne and claimed persons with the virus could pass it to others about six feet away. A media platform joined in a conference to discuss the spread of misinformation of the virus on the African continent. A Scientist at KCCR claimed the data that was available proved the spread of the COVID-19 was low.
- On 7 October, a brain specialist stated that going back to sports after the corona virus pandemic without any mental therapy would be disastrous for African football. The Chief Director of Ministry of Finance urged others in the Civil service in Ghana to embrace opportunities that arose as a result of the pandemic. The general secretary of a union called on Global Leaders to prioritize the efforts of teachers in the face of COVID-19. The managing director of a bank claimed even though the pandemic has caused some disruptions, they supported GJA Awards along with two others.
- On 8 October, the Bono East Regional Births and Deaths Registration Officer claimed there was a reduction in births and deaths registration in the region because of the COVID-19 pandemic. The ECG said some of its customers refused to pay their bills after the government's 3-month COVID-19 electricity reduction expired. The Minister of Aviation claimed the standard COVID-19 prevention protocols that has been observed at KIA sustained the 'attractiveness' of the airport during the pandemic.
- On 9 October, a writer wrote an article on the need to start planning and preparing for the distribution of the COVID-19 vaccine if it was ready.
- On 10 October, the CEO of UGMC disclosed only one Chinese national was at the COVID-19 treatment facility. The Minister for Gender, Children and Social Protection said that about 75,000 vulnerable people in some regions in the country received financial support due to the impact of the pandemic. The minister also urged Ghanaians to protect girls during this pandemic and their rights protected. The CEO of an entertainment industry claimed he was not really affected by COVID-19.
- On 11 October, researchers in Australia claimed Covid-19 can be infectious on surfaces on some items for 28 days. According to the CEO of National Petroleum Commission, Covid-19 led to the cancellation of some petroleum contracts.
- On 12 October, a CSO urged political parties in the country to publish their corona virus campaign guidelines. A conference was set to be held to empower businesses for their sustainability and success in the face of Covid-19.
- On 13 October, an MP commissioned a borehole to aid in the hand-washing protocol to stop the spread of the virus. The NCCE and the GMA told the political parties in the country to adopt new ways of campaigning to avoid a second wave of the pandemic. An association claimed trade barriers restricted its members after the second wave of the pandemic in those countries they trade with.
- On 14 October, airlines were claimed to expect to lose about US$300,000 every minute for the second half of the year due to the impact of the pandemic. An agency predicted those who export oil from EM would face severe revenue cut due to the pandemic. The CEO of an agency threatened to sue the government and other stakeholders for the Covid-19 testing at KIA and detaining of Ghanaian travelers. An international company donated some test kits to MoH to help in government's response to Covid-19. A joint venture company donated PPEs to health workers.
- On 15 October, the MoH received a Covid-19 AI software for detecting the virus on Chest X-rays. An association in the US called on government to reduce the Covid-19 test fee at KIA. The director of health promotion at GHS claimed electronic health delivery is the future of the country's health system. A network in Ghana was set to host a conference to empower businesses despite the pandemic's challenges. A player of the national football team tested positive for the virus.
- On 16 October, a Ghanaian player was ruled out of a match after testing positive to the virus. Ghana's rail line in the Western region was to begin operation after it was suspended due to the outbreak of the pandemic. A company donated some face masks to the La Polyclinic to encourage the wearing of the masks.
- On 17 October, the CEO of Salt Media advised the government to communicate well on the changes to the Covid-19 test payments for arrivals in Ghana. WaterAid Ghana urged the government to provide water and hygiene to curb the spread of the virus. Ghanaians were claimed to have increased the intake of fruits and vegetables during the Covid-19 pandemic to boost their immune system. It was reported 55 African countries had more than 1,600,000 confirmed cases. An association commended the government for the new decisions that helped the local industries to make materials in the fight against the pandemic.
- On 18 October, Ghanaian player, Jordan Ayew tested positive for the virus. It was claimed the pandemic has brought about the use of technology and digitization for education systems across the world. The president of Ghana in his address to the nation said Ghana has a low Covid-19 death rate. A lady appealed to the government to make measures of protecting and motivating of front line workers.
- On 19 October, a digital-based health system introduced a new form of testing of COVID-19 for passengers and others in the country. The President claimed the country had no patient in the COVID-19 Isolation centers in Ghana, but he also warned Ghanaians to be cautious and adhere to the protocols. The GFA claimed it took all the COVID-19 protocols during the country's friendly matches against Mali and Qatar. A student tested positive for the virus. The Presidential Advisor on Health claimed Ghana was not in the stage of second wave of COVID-19 infections. A virologist at KCCR claimed Ghana was unlikely to suffer a second wave of the virus.
- On 20 October, the Deputy Health Minister claimed the decision to keep the country's air borders not risky, he also claimed the government is not hiding figures on COVID-19 to bring about false sense of security in the country. An organization sensitized residents of a community on COVID-19 and also donated some items. Women entrepreneurs helped by the NBSSI to begin their businesses to be strong after the impact of the pandemic. The Information Minister claimed there should be more awareness on the reason why all COVID-19 protocols should be observed. The health minister cautioned Ghanaians to be wary despite the continued easing of COVID-19 restrictions.
- On 21 October, the outbreak of the pandemic affected the bloodstock at a hospital. The Information Minister praised the President for showing leadership in the fight against the pandemic in Ghana. A psychologist cautioned political parties in Ghana to abide by the COVID-19 protocols.
- On 22 October, the minority in parliament raised concern with the contract awarded on the testing of COVID-19 at KIA, and also accused the government of using monies raised during the pandemic to enrich themselves. Ghanaians were cautioned on the defying of COVID-19 protocols as the pandemic was still around. The GIS asked the residents along the border communities to report foreigners who enter Ghana illegally.
- On 23 October, the Deputy Health Minister backed the $150 charged at KIA for the COVID-19 test. A company donated PPEs to a school to help prevent the spread of the virus. An organization donated PPEs to three health facilities to support in the fight against COVID-19.
- On 24 October, a pastor was disappointed on the government's decision to give the COVID-19 contract to a foreigner. A security risk officer of SCB advised organizations to work from home as it has come to stay as a result of COVID-19. A Ghanaian player disclosed COVID-19 halted his move to an Ethiopian football team.
- On 25 October, the Chief Justice charged the media with adhering to the COVID-19 protocols.
- On 26 October, a former deputy general secretary of NDC claimed the amount charged at KIA for COVID-19 testing was 'reasonable'. A PC for Tema East Constituency organized a health walk to create awareness oF COVID-19. The chairperson of a Ghana's Polio Plus Committee claimed vaccination of children in the era of the pandemic was very critical. Deputy Health Minister claimed there could be a reduction of the amount charged for the COVID-19 test at KIA.
- On 27 October, the MD of State Transport Corporation disclosed the borders of Ghana that was closed during the pandemic resulted to low revenue. The CEO of Microfinance and Small Loans Center said the institution would reduce the loan recovery rate due to the outbreak of the virus. The Okyenhene donated some materials and items to a hospital due to the outbreak of COVID-19.
- On 28 October, the opposition party alleged the country's debt did not rise because of COVID-19 pandemic. The GHS advised Ghanaians to seek medical treatments at health centers during the pandemic. The President advised the people to follow strictly the COVID-19 protocols. A medical officer of CAF urged the Ghanaian government to support clubs with the testing of COVID-19 before the start of the premier league. The Deputy Minister for Health said 97 persons who were asymptomatic to the virus were discovered at KIA.
- On 29 October, a commissioner at ECOWAS claimed the pandemic increased the rate at which women are insecure and are mostly at risk. A news outlet was said to have confirmed UG investigated relations between NMIMR and a healthcare service because of COVID-19 testing at KIA. MODEC donated $600,000 worth of COVID-19 items to four Ghanaian Testing Centers/Labs.
- On 30 October, the Deputy Health Minister cautioned the public to stick to the adherence of COVID-19 protocols. The Deputy Finance Minister was claimed to have justified the nation's debt due to the pandemic. A political party brought about a post-COVID-19 plan to change the nation against unpredictability of the pandemic. Nurses and midwives signed an MoU with the COVID-19 Recovery and Resilience program. Ghanaians in some European countries donated some funds to the Ministry of Foreign Affairs in the fight against the pandemic.
- On 31 October, the Deputy CEO of GAB claimed banks invested in digitization before COVID-19 set in. The Chief of Staff urged Ghanaians to observe the COVID-19 protocols to avoid new cases. The USAID, the MoH, the GHS and other government institutions launched ways to address COVID-19 prevention protocols.

=== November 2020 ===
- Model-based simulations indicate that the 95% confidence interval for the time-varying reproduction number R_{t} was stable around 1.0 in November.
- On 1 November, an article was published linking the degradation of nature and pandemic increased risks such as COVID-19.
- On 2 November, the board chairman of the National Theatre appealed to chiefs in Ghana to help in the fight against the pandemic. A Department at the GHS blamed the rise in COVID-19 cases due to the disregard of the safety protocols at public gatherings. A research work by NMIMR and another institution claimed over a million people in Accra and Kasoa were exposed to the virus. A company donated immune boosters to KIA management to fight COVID-19. The GMA began an educational campaign to demonstrate on adhere to the protocols.
- On 3 November, the GHS claimed there was no indication of a second COVID-19 outbreak in the country. A former president of Ghana blamed the government for given up on the fight against COVID-19. The national chairman of a political party claimed it was likely there would be a second wave of the virus in the country, he also blamed the NCCE, and other government agencies for relaxing against the disease. The VC of UCC urged graduates of the school to make research into the COVID-19 pandemic and help in finding a solution. The Chamber of Tourism pleaded for the reduction of the fee charged at KIA.
- On 4 November, an article was published on factors that helped to maintain COVID-19 pandemic. The director-general of GHS claimed because of public threats which were likely to come after the pandemic, people with HIV should adhere to ART. A former Municipal Chief Executive for Akwapim North claimed political parties should not be blamed for non-adherence to the safety protocols during campaigns.
- On 5 November, the GHS cautioned of a possible second wave of COVID-19 in the country. A bank decided to adopt innovative working habits which was brought up by COVID-19. The flag-bearer of a political party claimed he bring a new mode of distribution of COVID-19 packages for businesses.
- On 6 November, the President claimed the Ghana's fight against the pandemic was 'successful' due to the agricultural sector, and food was in abundance despite the difficulties the pandemic brought. A Church commended the government for how it tackled COVID-19. The best farmer in the Hohoe Municipal claimed the pandemic made access to agricultural inputs hard for farmers. The advisor to the president said political parties were engaged by the National COVID-19 task-force to follow the safety protocols.
- On 7 November, the advisor to the president warned against the notion of the virus is no more in Ghana. The RGD of Ghana extended deadline for filing of tax returns due to COVID-19. 3 members of Hearts of Oak were reported to have tested positive for COVID-19.
- On 8 November, drivers at a lorry station appealed to the police to enforce putting on of face masks. The Chief of Manya Krobo advised political party members to adhere to the safety protocols. About 172 cases of COVID-19 were recorded among travelers at KIA. According to the President, the country records 130 new cases averagely per day.
- On 9 November, the CEO of a company claimed the virus should be tackled with seriousness against a second wave. The President said the rise of COVID-19 cases was due to not observing the protocols by Ghanaians, he also warned airlines who go against the PCR testing for the virus would be sanctioned, and also warned political party members to adhere to the safety protocols. The 2020 Africa Investment Forum was postponed to 2021 because of COVID-19. 2 Ghanaian celebrities partnered with the Mastercard Foundation to create awareness on COVID-19. The GHS warned the public to adhere to the safety protocols. The third phase of the national market disinfection exercise also began on that day. Zoomlion in conjunction with the Ministry of Local Government and Rural Development undertook the exercise to disinfect markets in Wenchi, Amponsahkrom, Subinso, Boku and markets in other towns nearby.
- On 10 November, the director-general of GHS blamed the rise in COVID-19 cases to non compliance of the safety protocols. According to the President, imported cases of the virus at KIA went up by 87%. The Information Minister claimed campaign rallies of political parties was not the cause of increase of COVID-19 in Ghana. According to the Ashanti Regional Health Director, about 12% of people in the region wore face masks. The Afro Nation Ghana 2020 was called off because of COVID-19. 676 school children were reported pregnant during the pandemic period in the Volta region. CODEO blamed political parties for the disregard of the COVID-19 safety protocols in their campaigns.
- On 11 November, a political party advised its members to observe the safety protocols during campaign activities. A group blamed the government for the increase in COVID-19 cases. A Security Consultant claimed the lowering of the safety protocols for political activities caused the rise in the country's case counts. The president of GMA advised the public to observe strictly the laid down safety protocols and be cautious of their health. The Chief Executive of Ayawaso North Assembly said the people in the community need to go into gardening to avert the difficulties brought by the pandemic. The Gomoa Central District Assembly was claimed to have had an improvement in revenue collections amid the pandemic. The NBSSI supported businesses with funds under the CAP BuSS that suffered from the pandemic. The MoH coordinated with other institutions to deal with the pandemic.
- On 12 November, a security expert claimed COVID-19 is more of a security threat than a health risk. Former president Jerry Rawlings died from COVID-19, aged 73. The director-general of GHS claimed failure of private testing firms to provide information to the national COVID-19 response team is a fault line. The third phase of the market disinfection exercise for Accra began.
- On 13 November, global leaders called for access to future COVID-19 treatment and vaccines universally. 32 artisans were trained for the production of hand washing facilities to help in observing COVID-19 protocols. COVID-19 cases detected at KIA stood at 180. A political party advised its members to observe the safety protocols and limit campaign activities.
- On 14 November, the GPL recorded 56 positive cases of COVID-19. A journalist appealed to the government to instill fear into Ghanaians to reduce the impact of COVID-19. The NCCE in the Sekyere South District educated the public on the pandemic. The MOYS directed all sporting activities to be held behind closed doors after the spike of COVID-19 in Ghana. Hearts of Oak were reported to have recorded 31 cases of COVID-19.
- On 15 November, a senior partner at an institution advised businesses in the country to be ready for changes available after the COVID-19 era. The virus caused the postponement of another GPL match. The Municipal Chief Executive of Bolgatanga claimed the municipal would continue its efforts to avoid a second wave if the virus. An initiative was formed to help promote the fight against COVID-19. 245 markets in the Western Region are disinfected by Zoomlion Ghana Limited in the 3rd phase of the market disinfection exercise.
- On 16 November, the information minister claimed managers at workplaces should force the adherence to the safety protocols to stop the rise of the virus. The Secretary-General for AfDB said the $150 COVID-19 testing fee charged at KIA was 'scary'. A lecturer at UG claimed information about COVID-19 cases had been manipulated. Management at KIA revised the COVID-19 protocols for travelers into the country.
- On 17 November, KIA makes COVID-19 test free for ages 5–12 years.
- On 18 November, the 2020 edition of AFRIMA was deferred to 2021 due to COVID-19. A research conducted by the CRI resulted in more than 3,900 children claiming distance learning platforms were not effective and CRI also claimed more than 2,000 children tested positive for the virus in a research. Tema traders blamed politicians for the rise in COVID-19 cases. MTN in Ghana donated PPEs to a traditional council in Nzema District. The GP claimed it was hard to enforce law of the compulsory wearing of masks.
- On 19 November, the executive director of CRI suggested provision of information to the public to maintain strong immune system against the virus in children. A nurse advised Ghanaians to observe the safety protocols to fight against COVID-19. Nose masks dealers in Sunyani complained of low sales because of reduction in wearing them. The Chamber of Tourism appealed to the government to sideline tourists coming into the country from paying the fee charged at KIA. Experts in digital and marketing fields claimed COVID-19 has changed consumer behaviour in Ghana. UG reversed the fees initially published after it was criticized by protest on social media for not regarding hardship brought by the pandemic.
- On 20 November, the VP of GMA was worried there was non-adherence of the safety protocols, he also claimed the institution has not faced any shortage of medical supplies to fight the virus.
- On 21 November, a director at MoFA called for collaborations and investments in Agricultural activities digitally in the pandemic era. It was reported there was non-adherence to the safety protocols in the Oti and Volta regions. An institution advised there was a need for the country to embrace opportunities created by the pandemic.
- On 22 November, the GHS rolled out a project to help laboratories to carry out testing for COVID-19 and other factors. Some farmers in the Upper East region were supported under the COVID-19 response program. The GMA cautioned there would be a rise in COVID-19 cases.
- On 23 November, the GHS taught the people in Elmina about what the virus looks like, its transmission and its prevention. The people of Somanya claimed the pandemic affected their livelihoods. COVID-19 was said to have caused the trust of using technology in the banking sector. An association urged its members to be creative due to the impact of COVID-19 on their works.
- On 24 November, the president of GJA claimed the death of Jerry Rawlings and the outbreak of the pandemic brought down the political tension. It was claimed in an article COVID-19 has changed the dynamics of developments in the rural areas. The advisor to the president on health claimed Ghana is ready to adopt COVID-19 vaccines.
- On 25 November, the GHS claimed there was a rise in COVID-19 cases in October because of the disregard of the safety protocols. The CEO of a bank advised banks to meet shifting customers expectations after the pandemic. Two institutions partnered to donate face masks to the people of two towns. KIA recorded 120 COVID-19 cases during the month. The GHS claimed political rallies are not a reason in the rise of COVID-19 cases in Ghana. The Deputy Health Minister said the aged can easily be infected with the new COVID-19 wave. Dealers in face masks in Kumasi complained there was reduction in the sales because it is not worn by the people.
- On 26 November, the pandemic led to the non payment of salaries of workers at a hotel in Accra. The GHS established a working group for the assessment of deploying vaccines of Corona virus in Ghana. It was claimed vaccines of the virus might be available to countries in Africa likely before the end of 2021.
- On 27 November, stakeholders in the Ashanti region were trained by Care International and the GHS on COVID-19 risk communication. The Deputy Minister for Works and Housing commended the media for their role in the fight against COVID-19 in Ghana. The Council of Private Schools in the country claimed there was a delay in the disbursement of the COVID-19 relief package by the Government. There was a reduction in the wearing of nose masks in some part of Accra. The advisor of health to the president claimed the adoption of technology and innovation helped the health sector to check the spread of the virus.
- On 28 November, 'Health on wheels services' was introduced by a private healthcare due to the pandemic. A 60-bed District Hospital was inaugurated to improve healthcare in Twifo Praso in the Central region.
- On 29 November, it was claimed economies of African countries would have been better than the rest of the globe during the pandemic. The IOM announced that more than 150 Ghanaians in Libya were brought back due to COVID-19.
- On 30 November, there was a fire outbreak in the Intensive Care Unit of the Korle-Bu Teaching Hospital. This necessitated the transfer of three COVID-19 patients there to the University of Ghana Medical Centre. The President was petitioned to set free pastors who violated the COVID-19 protocols during the pandemic. The governor of BoG claimed there was a quick response by the government to the pandemic's effects on Ghana's economy. The president of GUTA claimed COVID-19 pushed the use of e-commerce among businesses in Ghana. Businesses in Assin Central received the relief packages by government to support their businesses from the effects of the pandemic. A Ghanaian film producer premiered a film on how the pandemic affected life of humans.

=== December 2020 ===
- Model-based simulations indicate that the 95% confidence interval for the time-varying reproduction number R_{t} was higher than 1.0 and rising in December.
- On 1 December, the CEO of Chamber of Bulk Oil Distribution claimed Ghana's businesses are not responding much to the changes caused by the pandemic. The AGI revealed about 80% of its members believe by the middle of 2021, they would recover from effects of the pandemic. Residents of the Obuasi East district were cautioned to observe the safety protocols. Ghanaians were cautioned by the Information Minister to adhere to the safety protocols.
- On 2 December, a writer claimed businesses which invested in technology and people would be the winners after the pandemic. 54 prison officers and 44 inmates were claimed to have tested positive for COVID-19 since it entered into Ghana. During the special voting of the 2020 Elections, the safety protocols were observed. The executive chairman of a hospital claimed the pandemic has raised the level of awareness to cater for workers.
- On 3 December, the cause of delay for the construction of the National Cathedral was blamed on COVID-19. Because of the hike of COVID-19, the president's health advisor made it known that games would be played behind close doors. The Obuasi East District Health Director cautioned the people to observe the COVID-19 protocols. Events management companies launched an association due to the conditions caused by the pandemic. Nurses and midwives were praised by a former VP of GRNMA for their service in the pandemic era. An NGO organized a ceremony to honor those who were affected by COVID-19 and also to mark one year anniversary since the outbreak of COVID-19.
- On 4 December, WaterAid Ghana launched a campaign to help fight the spread of the virus. CHRAJ in a statement claimed the pandemic has impacted the well-being of PWDs.
- On 6 December, the GHS claimed four COVID-19 patients were in critical condition, three were on ventilators and 15 were severe cases. An institute in the country donated nose masks to the coalition of election observers to share to the communities. The EC provided face masks to people in the rural communities.
- On 7 December, COVID-19 safety protocols were adhered at some polling stations during the 2020 Ghanaian Elections. The EC divided majority of the polling stations in the Sunyani East Constituency to curb over-crowding and prevent the spread of the virus.
- On 10 December, it was claimed rich countries hoarded more COVID-19 vaccines and so poor countries could miss getting the vaccines. The GSS claimed the inflation fell for the first time in November 2020 since the pandemic. An association in North America donated PPEs and other medical items to a hospital in the Upper West region. An envoy of AU claimed African countries would get access to the COVID-19 vaccines in the first quarter of 2021. The GHS anticipated the rise in COVID-19 cases due to the end of election celebrations.
- On 11 December, the GHS claimed it put measures in place to help the surveillance of areas and testing for the virus.
- On 12 December, an NGO provided some animals to a district in the Upper East region due to the effects of the pandemic. It was claimed there was a rise in GBV against women during the lock down in the COVID-19 era.
- On 13 December, it was claimed only about a third of countries in Africa could roll out the COVID-19 vaccination campaign 'successfully'. The FDA in the Upper East region reduced the number of officials on the field due to the pandemic.
- On 14 December, it was claimed Africa's challenge of acquiring the COVID-19 vaccine was access. COVID-19 pandemic increased the demand of virtual meetings and classrooms.
- On 15 December, the GES placed in some measures to enable students' return to school and observing COVID-19 protocols. The NCCE claimed the returning of students to school could be 'impossible' if new cases of the virus are not checked in Ghana. Lessons from the pandemic was claimed to have shown that usage of funds in the health sector protects the economy.
- On 16 December, it was claimed Ghanaians were concerned about the pause in regular updates of recorded cases by the GHS in the country. A Ghanaian rapper revealed he cancelled his world tour due to COVID-19. A report was launched by ECA to focus on post-COVID-19 to enable private sectors in countries in Africa to thrive.
- On 17 December, business women were advised to use ICT and social media to make their businesses known in the COVID-19 era. The NCCE cautioned market women to observe the COVID-19 protocols.
- On 18 December, the Western region was reported to have recorded 18 active cases. GIPC and an initiative of the German Ministry signed an MoU to support those affected by the COVID-19 restrictions, GIPC consolidated gains from foreign investments in the wake of the pandemic. Traders and buyers at some markets in Accra did not adhere to the COVID-19 protocols. CHRAJ revealed 10 places people who experienced stigmatization after testing positive for the virus could be supported.
- On 19 December, travelers who use Ghana's airports were assured of safety in the wake of the pandemic after the airports were disinfected.
- On 20 December, traders and buyers in Accra engaged in business without following the COVID-19 protocols. A nurse in the Upper East region advised the public to observe the COVID-19 protocols. An organization claimed in a research that only 7% of PWDs benefitted from the CAPBuSS. The New Juaben Traditional Council held a virtual meeting to discuss issues amidst the pandemic.
- On 21 December, most airlines in the country reduced their daily flights due to the pandemic. The director of an institute commended the Government for supporting SMEs during the pandemic. A radio presenter tested positive for the virus. COVID-19 was said to have brought a different dimension to the discourse of migration as it has spread without acknowledging borders worldwide. The Former Vice-Chair of a committee advised for fairness in the procurement and distribution of the COVID-19 vaccines. The GMA showed concerns over the behavior of law enforcement agencies in the fight against the virus. The President advised the public preparing for Christmas to observe the safety protocols. A youth activist shared his thoughts on COVID-19 and the future of the health sector in the country. The VC of TTU claimed the institution would keep the standards of academic sustainability amidst the threat of the pandemic.
- On 22 December, an institution donated food items to 3 correctional institutions and about 400 families due to the pandemic. The President was said to have received information from the COVID-19 Technical Task force on school re-openings. A company withdrawn their guidance due to the doubts caused by the pandemic. An initiative donated COVID-19 relief items to more than 1,000 children. GES held a training campaign on measures adopted for returning of schools including COVID-19 protocols.
- On 23 December, the GTA claimed it would shut down tourist facilities who fail to enforce the COVID-19 protocols. Some Ghanaians shared some plans on how to combine COVID-19 and Christmas. The GWCL claimed free water package by the Government would end on 31 December 2020. An NGO donated COVID-19 relief items to 2 districts. The public was said to have stopped observing the COVID-19 protocols.
- On 24 December, Ghanaians were cautioned to observe the COVID-19 safety protocols during the Christmas festivities. A Presiding Bishop of the Methodist Church Ghana advised Ghanaians to adhere to the safety protocols as they mark Christmas. Residents of Sekondi-Takoradi prepared for the Yuletide amidst the fear of the spread of the virus. An agency claimed water bills would be the responsibility of water consumers after the GWCL released a statement. An NGO claimed women and girls in Ghana faced difficulties due to the pandemic. An NGO received a food van to help in its distribution of food due to the impact of the pandemic.
- On 25 December, A Ghanaian journalist and blogger claimed he visited places in UK to find out the effects of the pandemic. Residents in Kumasi showed low expectations for the celebration due to the effect of COVID-19 on their livelihood. A pastor advised Christians to adhere to the COVID-19 protocols. Some traders in Ho expressed their disappointment in market sales due to the pandemic.
- On 26 December, the director of public health at the GHS claimed tested was going on to check if the new variant of COVID-19 was in Ghana. A fellow at the Ghana Center for Democratic Development said Ghana would receive the COVID-19 vaccine in 2021. It was reported people gathered at Sakumono beach to mark the celebration even though beaches were closed due to the pandemic. Over 180 children in Kumasi took part in COVID-19 themed art clinics.
- On 27 December, it was revealed the country conducted tests to see if the new variant of COVID-19 had arrived in Ghana. People shared the lessons they had from the pandemic and a comedian advised his fellow comedians. Three coastal beaches were awarded by USAID SF Management Program COVID-19 Project for observing the safety protocols. A UK-based Ghanaian pharmacist claimed it is impossible for Ghana to secure the COVID-19 vaccine by March 2021. The vice president of Africa operations at Newmont claimed all their workers recovered from the virus. A women organization donated PPEs to PWDs and other women groups. The Commercial Manager of MTN Ghana revealed the mobile money platform helped against the spread of COVID-19.
- On 28 December, about 100 female farmers were said to have paid back the credit facilities they had from a company due to the pandemic.
- On 29 December, the Christian Council advised churches to observe the COVID-19 safety protocols during the last night of the year. An article was published concerning the relapse and resurgence of the virus. The annual celebration of the GTA was held virtually and the usual display and pomp to climax the celebrations was held solemnly due to COVID-19.
- On 30 December, the Christian Council advised churches to reduce the time of their prayers to curb the spread of the virus. According to a family therapist, the COVID-19 travel restrictions had made it difficult for those in distance relationships. The residents of Sekondi-Takoradi celebrated Christmas without observing the safety protocols. It was claimed paying of bills without contact proved to be a way of dealing with the pandemic. According to the NCCE, religious bodies no longer observe the safety protocols.
- On 31 December, the founder of a group of companies advised Ghanaians to adhere to the COVID-19 safety protocols. A news portal published the 'winners' in the fight against the virus. The president of GUTA claimed the pandemic made it difficult for its members to do their businesses. A lady called on African leaders to lift their various countries from depending on foreign bodies for help after it was revealed rich countries would receive the COVID-19 vaccine first.
- Modelling by WHO's Regional Office for Africa suggests that due to under-reporting, the true number of infections in 2020 was around 7.7 million while the true number of COVID-19 deaths was around 968.
