= Kosi Yankey-Ayeh =

Ghanaian business executive

Kosi Antwiwaa Yankey-Ayeh
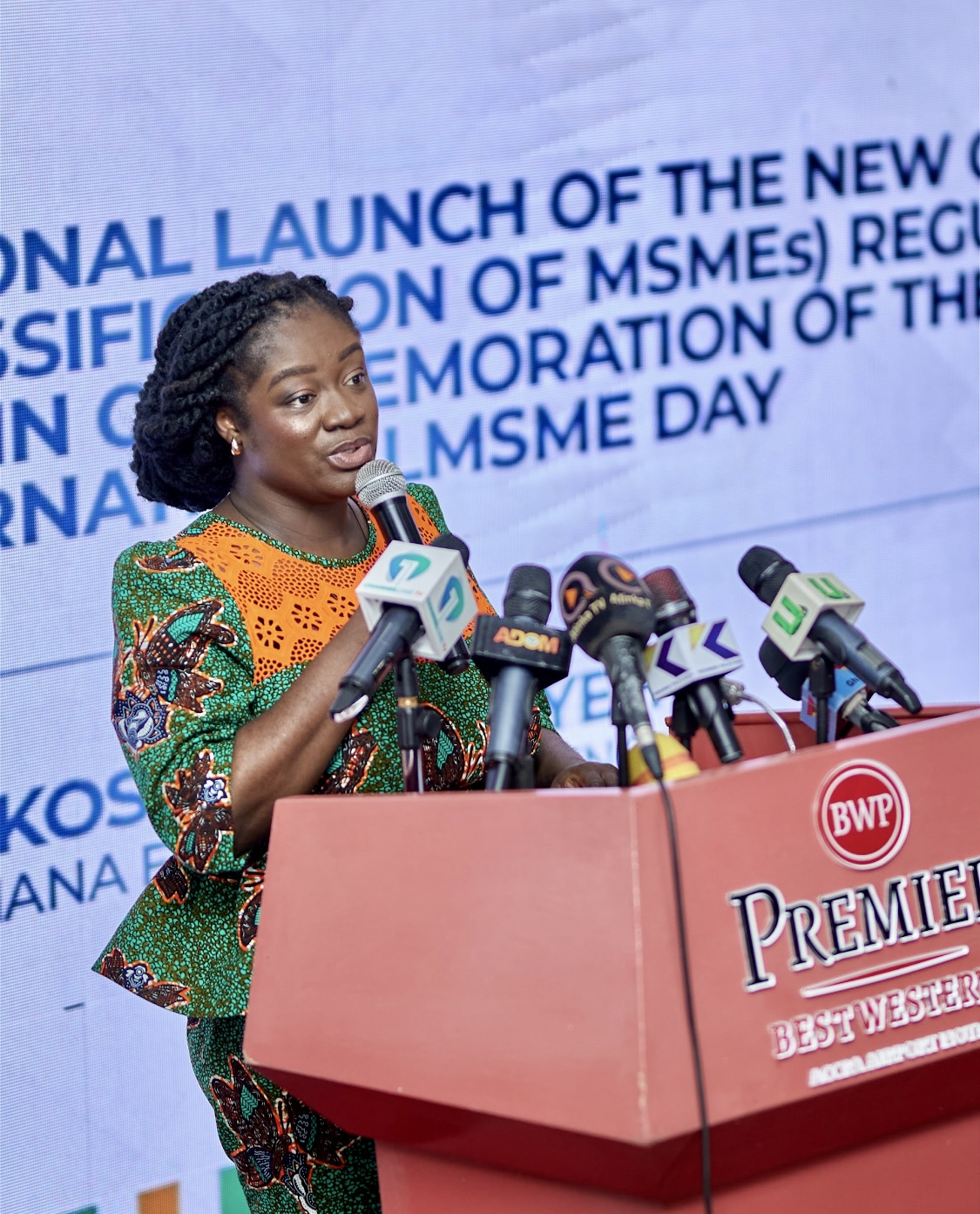
- Yankey-Ayeh in 2022
- Education: Wesleyan University; Harvard Kennedy School; Massachusetts Institute of Technology; Wageningen University & Research
- Occupation: Business executive
- Known for: Micro, Small and Medium Enterprise (MSME) development
- Title: Chief Executive Officer of the Ghana Enterprises Agency
- Awards: Best Female CEO – Made in Ghana Awards (2021)

Kosi Antwiwaa Yankey-Ayeh is a Ghanaian business executive. She was Chief Executive Officer of the Ghana Enterprises Agency (GEA), formerly the National Board for Small Scale Industries (NBSSI), where she oversaw government programmes supporting micro, small and medium-sized enterprises (MSMEs).

== Early life and education ==
Yankey-Ayeh earned a Bachelor of Arts degree in Government from Wesleyan University, Connecticut, United States. She later obtained a Master’s in Public Administration from the Harvard Kennedy School, where she received an academic excellence award as part of the Edward S. Mason Program.

In addition, she completed professional development courses in entrepreneurship and business acceleration at the Massachusetts Institute of Technology (MIT) Sloan School of Management and in market access for sustainable development at Wageningen University & Research in the Netherlands.

== Career ==
Yankey-Ayeh was appointed head of NBSSI in 2017, becoming the first woman to lead the institution. Under her leadership, the agency implemented the government’s Coronavirus Alleviation Programme Business Support Scheme (CAP BuSS), which disbursed financial assistance to micro, small and medium-sized enterprises affected by the COVID-19 pandemic.

She was later appointed as a board member of the Venture Capital Trust Fund.

== Awards and recognition ==
- Edward S. Mason Program Excellence Award – Harvard Kennedy School (2016)
- Best Female CEO of the Year – Made in Ghana Awards (2021)
