= Ghana Nurse and Midwife Trainees Association =

Nursing students' association

The Ghana Nurse and Midwife Trainees Association (GNMTA) is the official umbrella association of all nursing students and midwives in the republic of Ghana. It is affiliated to the Ghana Registered Nurses Association (GRNA).

== About ==
The Ghana Nurse and Midwife Trainees Association is the official voice of student nurses and midwives including interns in Ghana. The association covers all issues pertaining to welfare, discipline, and academics. The association is organized under national, zonal and local sectors with responsible executives at each level. GNMTA's membership consists of about three thousand nurses and midwives including students and interns.

== History ==
Though student unions of nurses and midwives have existed from the inception of nursing training in Ghana, GNMTA was officially registered in September 2007 under the provisions of Sections 27 and 28 of the companies code of the republic of Ghana.
