= Zoomlion =

Chinese construction and agricultural machinery manufacturer

Zoomlion Heavy Industry Science and Technology
- Native name: 中聯重科股份有限公司
- Type: Public
- Traded as: SZSE: 000157 (A share); SEHK: 1157 (H share)
- Industry: Heavy machinery Agricultural machinery
- Founded: September 28, 1992
- Founder: Zhan Chunxin
- Headquarters: Changsha, Hunan, People's Republic of China
- Products: Construction equipment Tractors; Combine harvesters Sugarcane harvesters
- Number of employees: 90,000
- Subsidiaries: Compagnia Maritima Internazionale
- Website: www.zoomlion.com

Zoomlion Heavy Industry Science and Technology Co., Ltd. is a Chinese construction machinery and agricultural machinery manufacturer. Its headquarters are in the Zoomlion Science Park in Changsha, Hunan, China. Zoomlion is China's largest and world's fifth largest construction machinery enterprise.

== History ==
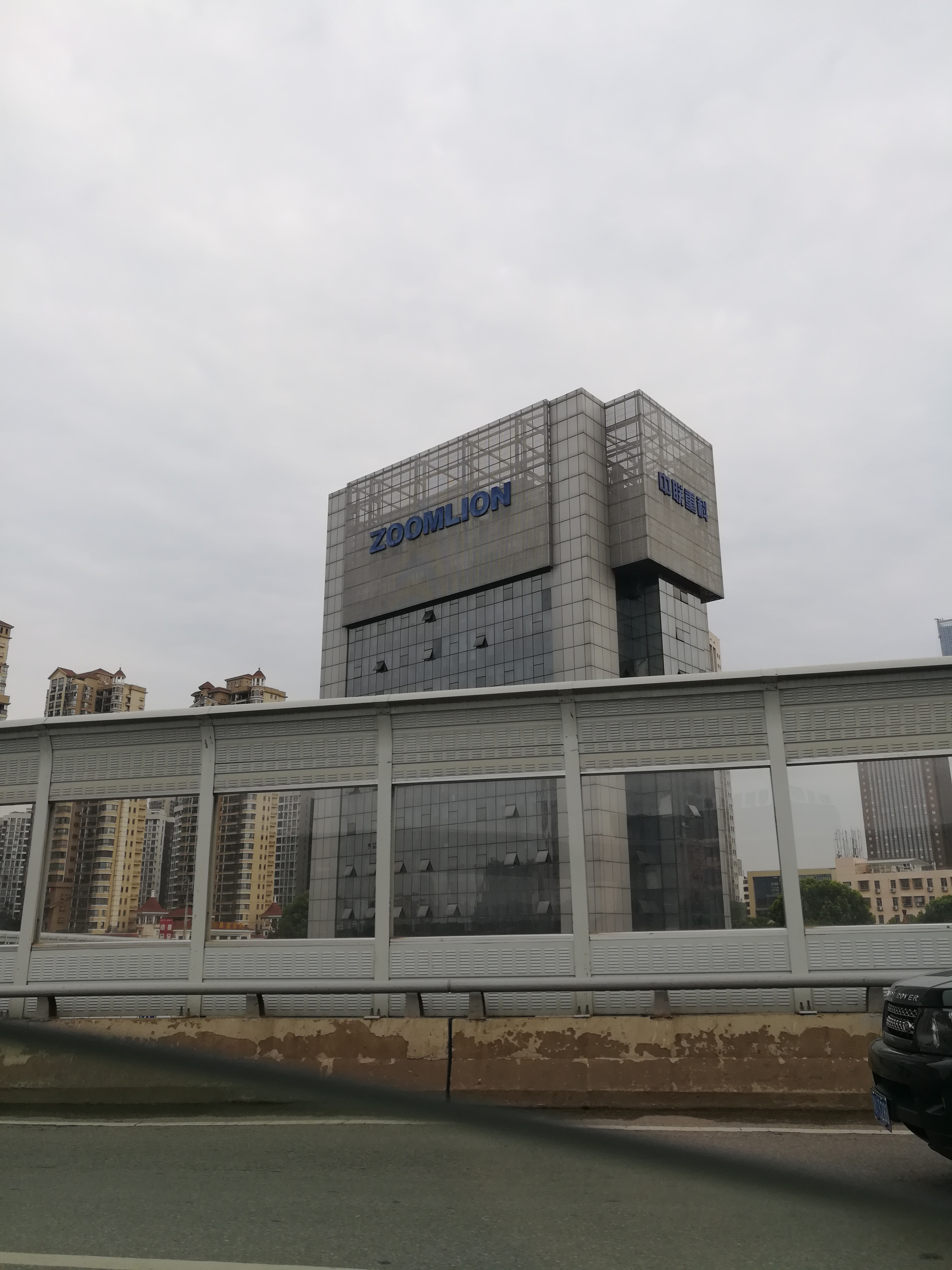
Zoomlion building in Yuelu District of Changsha, Hunan, China

Founded in 1992 as Changsha Hi-tech Development Area Zoomlion Construction Mechanical Industry Company, one of its first products were concrete pumps. The company grew out of a subsidiary founded in 1956 in Beijing, as part of the first Ministry of Machinery Industry, Ministry of Construction, Central Enterprise Work Committee.

=== Early acquisition of state-owned assets ===
Early development included the merging of several smaller, preexisting entities with Zoomlion including the former Concrete Machinery Research Office and remnants of the Changsha Construction Machinery Research Institute.

=== IPO ===
Marking its transition to a public company, Zoomlion made an initial public offering on the Shenzhen Stock Exchange on October 12, 2000, soon after acquiring ISO9001 certification.

=== Overseas expansion ===
A rarity at a time when developing country companies seldom acquired their developed country counterparts, Zoomlion bought the British company Powermole in the early 2000s. In 2008, Zoomlion made another foreign acquisition with the purchase of Italian concrete machinery manufacturer, Compagnia Italiana Forme Acciaio SpA (Cifa), in an equity link-up with Goldman Sachs, Mandarin Capital Partners, and Hony Capital.

Zoomlion entered the Turkish market in 2007 and opened the first office of its own local organization in 2018. In October 2022, the company opened a headquarters in Tuzla, Istanbul, later expanding to Ankara, İzmir and Adana.

According to a journalistic investigation by the International Consortium of Investigative Journalists and the Belarusian Investigative Center, Zoomlion and a co-owner of its subsidiary—the Minsk Automobile Plant (MAZ)—devised a scheme to circumvent U.S. sanctions imposed on the latter.

=== CCTV presentation ===
Having been previously featured in a 2001 CCTV documentary, an advertisement for the company was also presented on CCTV in May 2004.

=== Accusations of fraud ===
In May 2013, Chinese newspaper New Express reported on alleged fraud at Zoomlion. This caused Zoomlion to temporarily suspend trading of its stock and later resulted in a 9% decrease in its share price. Zoomlion accused the reporter Chen Yongzhou of "damaging business interests" and he has since been arrested. In October 2013, New Express published a large front-page plea for his release.

=== Chery Heavy Industry acquisition ===
In August 2014, Zoomlion purchased a majority share in the agricultural machinery maker Chery Heavy Industry. Zoomlion purchased 60 percent of the company for 2.08 billion yuan. With this acquisition Zoomlion intended to modernize China's agricultural machinery industry and compete with foreign brands that still dominate a big part of the medium and high-end large farm machinery market in China.

=== Environmental unit sale ===
Due to financial difficulties following a long term slow down in the Chinese construction industry Zoomlion sold its environmental unit in May 2017 for 11.6 billion yuan (US$1.7 billion). This came after the company reported a 929 million yuan loss in the 2015/16 period.

== Products ==
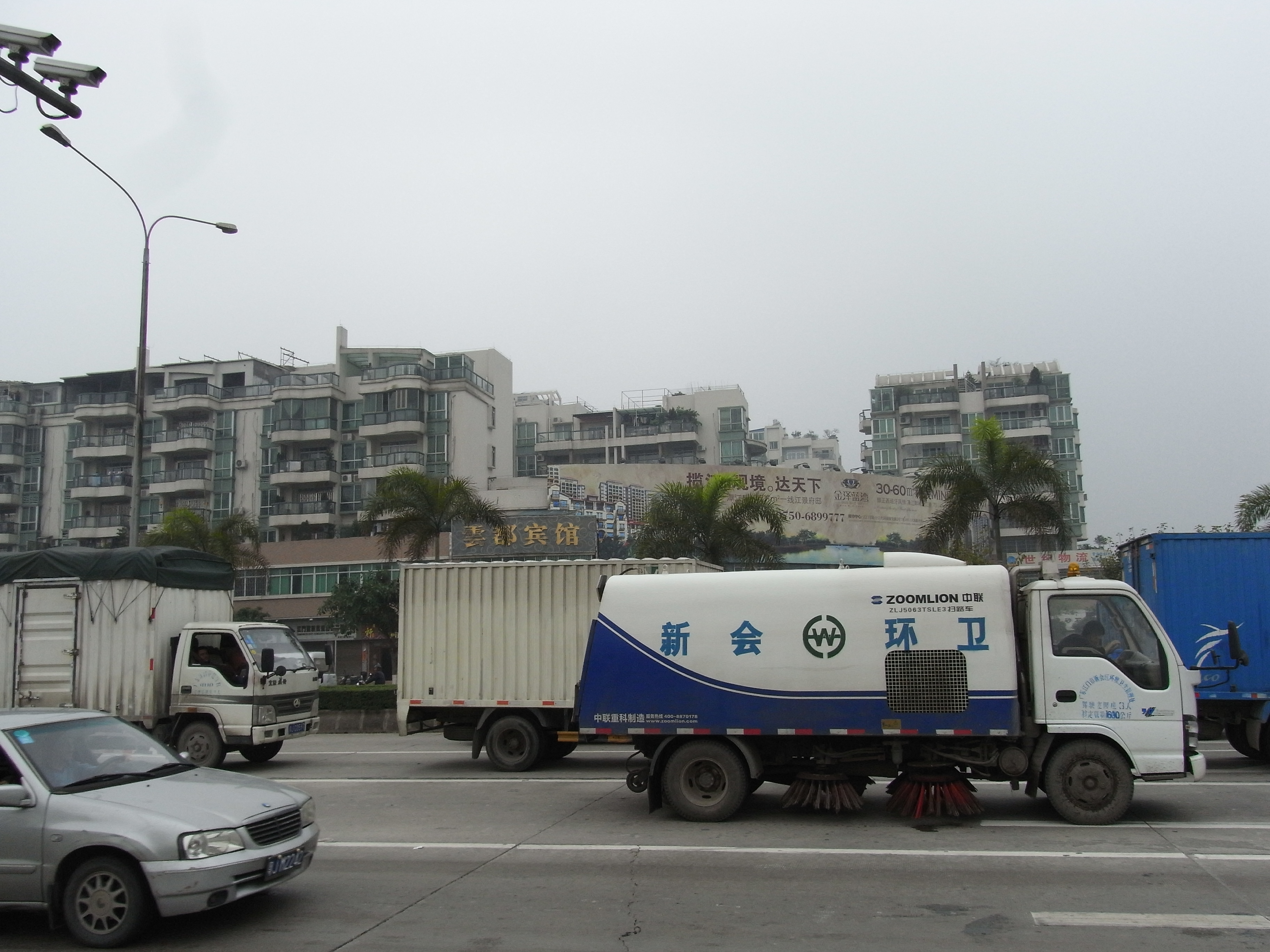
A Zoomlion road sweeper

Products are mainly truck-mounted, purpose-specific machinery; heavy machinery and include: bulldozers, concrete machinery, cranes (mobile cranes, tower cranes, etc.), excavators, fire apparatus, garbage compactor machinery, garbage trucks, loaders, asphalt pavers, pile foundation rotary drilling rigs, road rollers, snowplows, street sweepers, and various other road surface vehicles.

Zoomlion also sells agricultural machinery and include: tractors, combine harvesters and sugarcane harvesters.

Zoomlion has at least four brand names, including its own.

- AA
- Puyuan
- Zhongbiao

== Operations ==
=== Subsidiaries ===
All of the following may be subsidiaries or divisions of Zoomlion.

- Changsha Construction Machinery Research Institute
- Changsha Zoomlion Haiqiang Concrete Co Ltd
- China Engineer Machinery Academy Concrete Machinery Session
- Compagnia Italiana Forme Acciaio SpA (Cifa) – acquired in 2008
- Hunan Machinery Branch Company
- Hunan Machine Tool Works – acquired on December 21, 2002
- Hunan Zoomlion International Trade Co Ltd – located in Zoomlion Science Park, Changsha, Hunan it oversees export of Zoomlion products.
- Powermole Company – acquired on November 23, 2001
- Puyuan Group and Puyuan Engineer Machinery Co Ltd
- Zoomlion Bus Branch Company
- Zoomlion Finance & Leasing Co Ltd
- Zoomlion North Branch Company
- Zoomlion Hoisting Machinery Branch Company – originally located in Changde, moved to Changsha in June, 2006
- Zoomlion Puyuan Branch Company
- Puyuan Group Co Ltd – this unit has produced cranes
- Zoomlion Puyuan Special Vehicle Branch Company
- Zoomlion Xinxing Construction Machinery Leasing Co Ltd
- Zoomlion Zhongbiao Branch Company
- Zoomlion Zhongke Beidou

=== Production bases and facilities ===
Zoomlion owns 9 industrial parks, and at least one factory, the Puyuan Group Chassis Factory. Sites include:

- Zoomlion Science Park in Changsha, Hunan
- CIFA in Milan, Italy
- Huayin Industrial Park in Huayin, Shaanxi
- Ruanjiang Industrial Park in Yuanjiang, Hunan
- Guanxi Industrial Park in Changde, Hunan
- Songjiang Industrial Park in Songjiang, Shanghai
- Majiahe Industrial Park in Wangcheng District, Hunan
- Quantang Industrial Park in Changsha, Hunan
- Lugu Industrial Park in Lugu, Changsha, Hunan
