= Ghana Registered Nurses Association =

The Ghana Registered Nurses' and Midwives' Association (GRNMA), formerly known as Ghana Registered Nurses’ Association (GRNA), is a professional body of registered nurses and midwives in Ghana.

== History ==
The association was formed in March 1960 in a merger between Qualified Nurses Association, led by Mr. Mettle-Nunoo, and the State Registered Nurses Association, led by Dr. Docial Kisseih. In 2007, the Ghana Nurse and Midwife Trainees Association is officially registered.It became a Trade union in July 2005.
