= Coronavirus Alleviation Program =

The Coronavirus Alleviation Program Business Support Scheme (CAPBuSS) was launched in Ghana on 19 May 2020 by President Nana Akufo-Addo. It was formed as part of Ghana's government's intention of providing support to MSMEs who were affected by COVID-19 pandemic. It was presented by an agency under the Ministry of Trade and Industry in Ghana called NBSSI. The president announced GH¢1 billion after it was approved by the parliament of Ghana. The NBSSI ended the disbursement of funds in January 2021.

== Objectives ==
The objectives of the scheme are to provide emergency relief fund for MSMEs and entrepreneurs in Ghana, establish a comprehensive and financially sustainable emergency relief fund package for MSMEs and provide them with technical assistance to ameliorate the impact of COVID-19.

== Categories ==
The fund is said to be categorized into two loans with an interest rate of 3% which is payable within two years.

- Anidaso Soft Loan was meant for firms that are larger than micro-businesses.
- Adom Micro Loan was meant for lower micro enterprises.

== Job creation ==
According to the executive director of NBSSI, more than 21,800 jobs were created under this scheme which were mainly owned by youths in Ghana.

== Benefits ==
About 110,000 MSMEs in Ghana were said to be owned by women who have benefited from the funds set by the government. In October 2020, government launched an amount to aid banks in Ghana to give financial help to SMEs for their recovery from the shocks of the pandemic. The executive director of NBSSI claimed there was an approval for the disbursement of stimulus packages to over 1,000 private schools in the country.

The NBSSI in partnership with the Mastercard Foundation launched the Nkosuo Program for the support of both formal and informal sectors who were affected by the COVID-19 pandemic.

24 hours after the President launched the GH¢1 billion Coronavirus Alleviation Programme (CAP) Business Support Scheme, the National Board and Small Scale Industries (NBSSI) was flooded with applications from businesses seeking the opportunity to benefit from the stimulus package. It is estimated that the board received more than 8,000 applications from interested businesses as of the close of business on the day.

== Controversies ==
Even though the program was launched to cushion Ghanaian businesses, it somewhat failed to account the peculiar needs of persons with disabilities (PWDs) in its implementation. Research estimates that, only 7% of PWDs benefited from the program.

It was also revealed that Micro, Small and Medium Enterprise (MSME) in the North East Gonja District in the Savannah Region of Ghana did not benefit from the program.

It has also been revealed that district service providers were not well informed on the government's COVID-19 relief packages to educate the beneficiaries while the eligibility requirements for accessing the packages were not entirely clear to potential beneficiaries.

Information on the intervention was highly politicised as political figures were the carriers of the information in the district.
