= Child Rights International Network =

Child Rights International Network (CRIN) is an international network that supports the United Nations Convention on the Rights of the Child (CRC) and child rights. The network's goal is to advocate for children's rights and enforce them globally.

== History ==
When the CRIN was founded, it stood for "Children's Rights Information Network". Later on it was changed to what we know today as the "Children's Rights International Network" CRIN began in 1991 as an informal secretariat set up by Radda Barnen and Defence for Children International to circulate information produced from the reporting processes of the Convention, which was ratified in 1990. Organizations and groups typically go through 4 phases of development. The CRIN was in its first phase first dated back in 1991- all the way to July 1995. It was founded formally in 1995, by a secretariat in Save the Children head office in London, England. The process of founding CRIN started in 1991 during the Geneva years. During these initial years, the “secretariat” made up of Save the Children Sweden, and DCI (Defence for Children International) worked to form CRIN. Their work consisted of administrative work, such as funding and administration for the network. A group of NGO's (non-government organizations) and UNICEF worked informally to continuously develop CRIN until 1995. After the Geneva years, in 1995, CRIN was formally established. In the following years (1996-1997) the first big steps were taken as an organization. Newsletters were published, a website was made, CRIN published the directory of Child Rights Organizations. The Child Rights International Network now includes over 1200 organizations and is a viable information resource for the public. It has more than 2,000 members in 130 countries, mainly in Africa. Its founders have included the European Union, Save the Children Sweden and the Sigrid Rausing Trust. Child Rights International Network is currently partnered with many different NOGs around the world. For example, CRIN is a member of Consortium for Street Children. Other partners like, the Swedish government, the Tides Foundation, the Oak Foundation, and many more NGOs help fund CRIN. The CRIN has a yearly budget around 200 000 euros. Since CRIN is based out of Europe they operate in four main languages: English, Arabic, French and Spanish.

== Mission ==
The network believes that everyone needs works together to advocate for child rights, and that with enough child rights activists globally, child rights can be enforced.

=== The network currently has five core goals ===
1. rights not charity
2. we are stronger when we work together
3. information is power and it should be free and accessible
4. societies, organizations, and institutions should be open, transparent and accountable
5. we believe in promoting children's rights, not ourselves.

=== Goals for the future ===
- Try to incorporate professionals to help the organization grow, by expanding the knowledge of the community and members in hopes others will be able to further our intentions. They hope that will create change in the system.
- Keep track of violations against child's rights around the world
- Introducing discussions about the CRINs policies
- Use legal advocacy and campaigns to confront violations towards child's rights

These are just a few of the goals that the CRIN has in their sights in hopes to create opportunities for change.

== Member Organizations ==
=== Consortium for Street Children ===
The main focus of this organization is to get children who live on the streets voices heard. They follow four core values; “Challenging”, “Progressive”, “Collaborative”, and “Accountable”. April 12 is International day for Street Children.

=== Save the Children ===
Focused around getting children better opportunities in the subjects of: Education, Economic, and Health Care opportunities. As well as Helping out in natural disasters.

=== Child Workers in Asia ===
Non-Governmental Organization - started off just five organizations, grew to 50 different organizations in 14 countries. These organizations were focused on stopping child labor.

== Forms of advocacy ==
In order to create change in public systems and institutions they need to be advocated for. Advocacy is the mission of the Children's rights international Network and how they get their message of children's rights across the globe. Advocacy means they see the basic forms of advocacy helpful, but not the most effective when implemented alone.

- Writing letters
- Protesting
- Report writings
- Digital advocacy

They do not feel these are enough to make the impact they desire and need. They want to encourage people to take the next step. They believe the strongest form of advocacy would be taking the legal route. This means that you are able to represent a person that is not able to on there behalf in the legal system.

Examples:

- Legal advocacy
- Strategic litigation
- Legal representation
- Quasi-legal representation

== Laws ==
When human rights laws are enforced strictly they help people to claim their eligibility for freedom. Laws concerning children are taken into account and have to be legalized in child's rights laws under CRIN. Research is conducted by the CRIN to solidify child's rights laws. Anyone is able to replicate this research because the CRIN provides guidelines on how their research is conducted. The legal report has general common laws for areas like violence towards children. The CRIN's goal is to create a better understanding and enforcement of child rights by using legal advocacy. CRIN advises people to take all legal complaints concerning child rights to local or international legal personal.

=== Childs Rights reforms the CRIN follows up on ===
==== Inhuman Sentencing of Children ====
This reform is to stop children from being prosecuted wrongly. The CRIN does intense legal research on the states that have yet to remove these horrific sentences. In 40 states the Justice system exposes the children to Flogging, Amputation, and even Caning. These forms of punishment is referred to as Corporal Punishment . The Death Penalty on children is continued to be used today in 14 different countries. They can undergo Shootings, Hangings, Stoning, and the most popular/well-known one of all Lethal Injection. The research being conducted and the tabs being kept on the countries are all efforts in ending these cruel punishments. Key component ‘naming and shaming’ campaign.

==== Children’s Rights Case Database ====
This database holds all the information for the CRIN to scan through and help get promote awareness of any case that has to do with the convention on the rights of a child.

==== More states criminalizing more children ====
This aspect of children's rights is also closely monitored as states have been slow to advance juvenile justice reforms. This represents a challenge to the group's mission; it goes against the rights of large groups of children. The CRIN advocates for children and seeks a lower criminal age of responsibility. To that end, they continue to gather information and raise awareness.

== Areas of concerns ==
=== Child Sex Trafficking ===
This is a major concern for the CRN, Organizations like this are what help bring awareness of these issues society tries to ignore. This makes sure this children have a voice. This is a major concern for the CRN, Organizations like this are what help bring awareness of these issues society tries to ignore. This makes sure the children are represented for. Sex trafficking can cause lasting effects mentally on a child not just physical. Studies show that 70-85% of the time the victims know who is assaulting them. There is a common misconception that these two are the same thing. There is a difference between Child Sex Trafficking and Sale of a Child. Child Sex Trafficking can be conducted without any money at all. Nobody can even be involved its more of the physical aspect of transporting the child.

== Donors ==
- Norwegian Ministry of Foreign Affairs
- Save the Children Sweden
- Oak Foundation
- Swedish International Development Cooperation Agency
- Private donor

These five donors are the organizations that help finance the Children's Rights International Network
