= Sugarcane harvester =

Harvesting machine

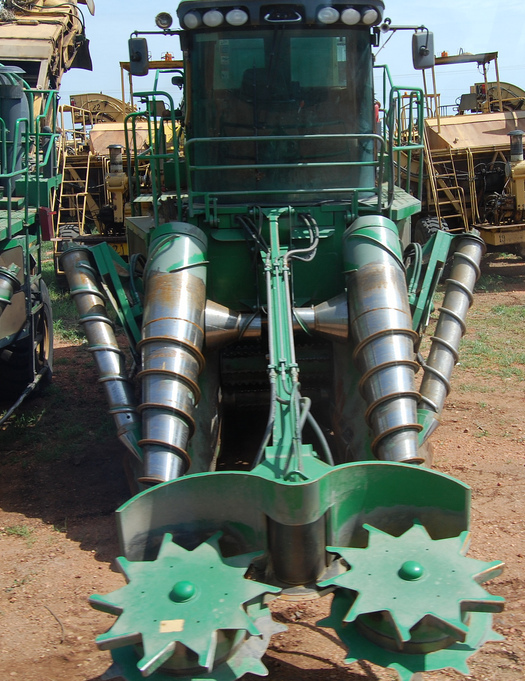
A sugarcane harvester

A sugarcane harvester is a large piece of agricultural machinery used to harvest and partially process sugarcane.

The machine, originally developed in the 1920s, and first commercially employed in the 1950s, remains similar in function and design to the combine harvester. These agricultural machines are used to cut, strip, and collect cane stalks for use in sugar production. Sugarcane Harvesters can broadly be split into two major types, chopper and whole stalk, and support two types of harvesting methods, namely burnt and green cane harvesting. Sugarcane harvesters are widely employed across major cane-producing regions of the world including: Australia, Brazil, India, China, Thailand, Pakistan, Mexico, Colombia, Indonesia, Philippines, and USA.

== History ==
=== Early mechanization ===
In Australia, demand for mechanical harvesting grew in the 1950s due to a decrease in agricultural workers. In 1959, brothers Robert Rossi and Rick Rossi introduced the prototype of the Massey Ferguson 515 harvester to farmers. The 515 harvester is a type of 'chopper' harvester, as the machine evenly chopped the cane into billets evenly. As a result of the harvester's implementation, the cane output doubled. In the 1960s and 1970s, engineers worked with the sugar industry to refine the mechanisms for greater efficacy.

=== Brazil ===
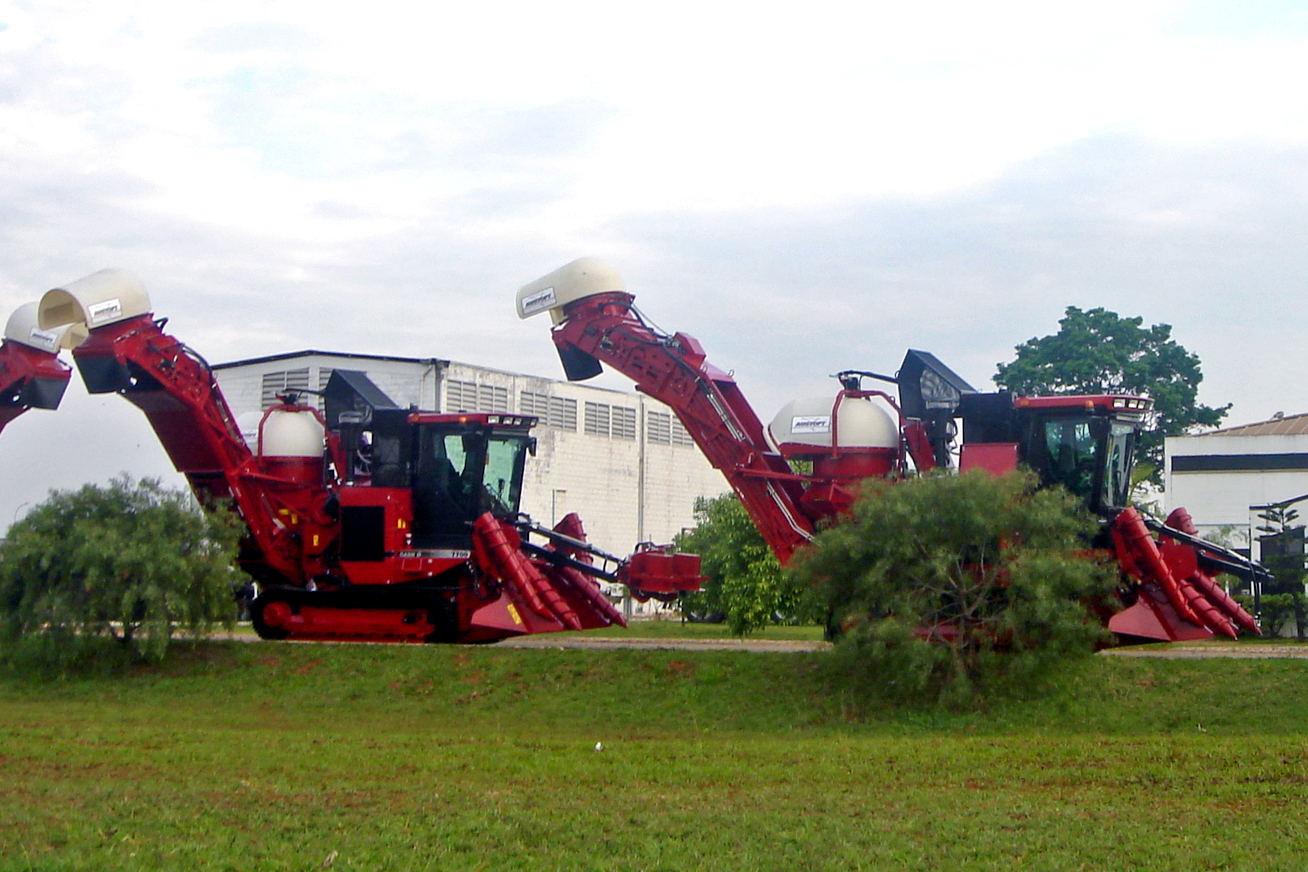
Sugarcane harvesters used in Brazil to harvest chopped cane, a Case 7700 cane harvester on the left; Piracicaba, Brazil

In Brazil, sugarcane was harvested by hand for nearly five centuries. Workers first burned the fields before harvest and then used machetes to cut the stalks. Sugarcane harvesters began to be widely used in São Paulo starting in 2009. In the period between 2006 and 2010, harvester sales increased from 478 units in the first half of the year.

== Types ==
Sugarcane harvesters can be categorized into chopper and whole stalk harvesters. Whole stalk harvesters separate sugarcane by the entire stalk while chopper separates them into billets.

=== Chopper ===
The whole stalk harvester has eight components. The topper is the opening for the stalk to enter and cuts the green leafy part of the sugarcane. Then, the knockdown roller rolls the sugarcane forward, preparing it to be cut. The crop divider separates crops gently to be fed into the base cutter. The fin roller grabs and feeds the base of the cane to the machine. The base cutter separates the stalk from its roots. The feeding rollers push the stalk into the chopper, where the stalk is cut into billets. The primary extractor is attached above the feeding rollers using airflow to lift and remove leafy debris as stalks pass through the chopper.

=== Whole Stalk ===
The design of the whole stalk harvester is very similar to the chopper, with the main difference being the omission of the chopper mechanism. The whole stalk harvester has six parts. The topper, crop divider, and base cutter function the same and are used in sequential order. Then, a conveying device, typically in the form of a feeding roller, pushes the stalk forward. And finally, a defoliating device removes, shreds, and cleans trash from cut sugarcane stalks, before it is placed in a cane collector at the rear end of the machine.

== Harvester mechanism ==
=== Cutting ===
The blade velocity, tilt angle, and blade shapes determine the effectiveness of cut force and cut quality. This in turn determines the amount of cane loss from cutting. The max motor speed is 400rpm with a feed rate of 3 stalks/min, while the optimal motor speed for uniform cutting is 300rpm at a rate of 1 stalk/min. Higher engine speeds decrease cutting efficiency, most likely because it disrupts uniform cutting motion.

=== Feeding ===
An upper feeding mechanism paired with a contra-rotating lower feeding mechanism is used to transport whole stalks through the system.

=== Cleaning and extraction ===
Air blast configurations are used in Brazil to remove leafy debris and separate trash, minimizing impurity rates to 15 to 20%.

== Harvesting methods ==
Sugarcane is harvested in two different ways: Burnt cane harvesting and Green cane harvesting. Burnt cane harvesting has been the standard harvesting method worldwide since the Industrial Revolution, while green cane harvesting is the more sustainable approach. Both methods are possible by hand and machine.

=== Burnt cane harvesting ===
Burnt cane harvesting involves burning a predetermined amount of field with sugarcane. The fire burns away excess leaves and foliage, leaving the sugarcane stalk. This reduces the amount of trash that enters the harvester by 80% and increases mechanical harvesting efficiency by 30-40%. Mechanical sugarcane harvesting methods were introduced to reduce burnt cane harvesting and promote green cane harvesting.

=== Green cane harvesting ===
Green cane harvesting leaves the excess foliage intact prior to harvesting. This method is more sustainable than burnt cane harvesting as the excess trash layer deposited in the field acts as both a natural protection from pests and fertilizer for the growing stalks. Green cane harvesting is more difficult for mechanical harvesters, shown to increase fuel consumption by 12% and reduce harvesting rate by 17% compared to burnt cane harvesting.

== Economic impact ==
=== São Paulo ===
In São Paulo, Brazil, the increased use of sugarcane harvesters caused a decrease in the number of manual laborers used from 158,000 to 140,000. The adoption of sugarcane harvester in Sao Paulo was motivated by the desire to reduce labor costs. The deaths of 20 sugarcane workers accelerated the transition from manual cane cutting to mechanical harvesting in São Paulo. While mechanization increased productivity, it also required workers to acquire technical skills to operate and maintain harvesting machines.

== Environmental impact ==
Burnt cane harvesting has been associated with negative impacts on communities surrounding fields, especially respiratory issues. Environmental issues caused by primarily burnt cane harvesting are emissions from burnt foliage and fertilizer runoff into local water systems. In response to the issues that arise from burnt cane harvesting, there are programs that incentivize the switch to green cane harvesting. Mechanized green cane harvesting can reduce environmental impacts compared to burnt cane harvesting. Integration of green cane harvesting reduces the effects of emissions and local impacts that result from the harvesting process.

== Machine manufacturing expenses ==
The production and maintenance of sugarcane harvesters procures quantifiable environmental costs. The assembly of a single-row sugarcane harvester requires on average a direct input of approximately 18.79 GJs and 15.70 m³. This level of electricity energy expenditure in the manufacturing process is generated by illumination, electric tools, computer equipment, air conditioning, and air compression. Electricity accounts for 88.9% of the total energy demand in manufacturing a single-row sugarcane harvester, making it the dominant energy input. Water use is driven primarily by direct consumption during the assembly process, associated with upstream-inputs, and accounts for approximately 1.2% of total energy demand. Indirect input of water is mostly food and water for labourers and utilizes 1.83 m³ per machine. On a mass basis, sugar cane harvester manufacturing requires 1.3 MJ per 1 kg of electricity and 1.18 Liters per 1 kg of water.

== See also ==
- Zafra (agriculture) - the sugarcane harvesting season
- Combine harvester
- Sugar plantations in Hawaii
