= Ghana Union of Traders Association =

- Abbreviation: GUTA
- Type: Trade association
- Purpose: Regulation and advocacy for traders in Ghana
- Headquarters: Ghana
- Region served: Ghana

Ghana Union of Traders Association (GUTA) is the umbrella body that regulates the activities of trades in Ghana. The body also lobbies the Government of Ghana on issues that affect traders in the country.

== Initiatives ==
The Union undertakes several initiatives aimed at the interest and activities of traders in the country.
