= Ghana Enterprises Agency =

Ghanaian government agency

The Ghana Enterprises Agency (GEA) is a Ghanaian government agency under the Ministry of Trade and Industry. The GEA is mandated by the Ghana Enterprises Agency Act, 2020 (Act 1043) to promote and develop MSMEs in Ghana. It replaced the National Board for Small-Scale Industries (NBSSI).

Its aim is to interrelate, administer and stimulate the development of Micro, Small, and Medium Scale Enterprises (MSMEs). GEA is currently headed by Magaret Ansei (MAGOO), a former Municipal Chief Executive Officer of the Suhum Municipal District in the Eastern Region (Ghana). The Persons With Disabilities (PWD) Enterprise Support Programme to help improve businesses owned by PWDs was launched in 2023 by Ghana Enterprise Agency (GEA) and is being supported by the World Bank on a programme titled Ghana Economic Transformation Project.

== Resources and coverage ==
- The GEA has offices across the regions and about 178 districts in Ghana namely Ahafo region, Ashanti region, Central region, Upper East region, Volta region, Greater Accra region, Savannah region, Upper West region, Western region, Bono region, Eastern Region, Northern region, North East region, Bono East region, Western North region, and Oti region.

== Aims of GEA ==
1. To contribute to the creation of an enabling environment for the small-scale enterprise development.
2. To contribute to the development of an enterprise culture in Ghana by facilitating access to credit.
3. Facilitate MSEs access to substantial and high quality Business Development Services for their development.

== Services ==
It delivers services such as funding, business development and business performance.

== Registration process ==
- First the Applicant must select the event she/he wants to register for.
- In order to access the registration form, the Applicant may either use her/his account identifiers if she/he is already a member of the NBSSI's or apply directly as a new user.
- Once the registration process is initiated, the Applicant must provide general information about her/him and her/his organization (required information will be marked with an asterisk).
- The Applicant is then provided with information regarding the applicable price.
- The Applicant is then asked to tick the T&Cs’ acceptance box, to choose the desired payment method, to provide her/his invoicing information and to submit her/his payment.
- Once this stage is complete, the registration is confirmed.

== Partners ==
The NBSSI partners with some organizations such as the Ministry of Trade and Industry, USAID, EU, Christian Aid, UNICEF, Ghana Standards Authority, Ministry of Inner-Cities and Zongo Development among others.

The NBSSI partnered with Mastercard Foundation to embark on a project.

The GEA partnered with World Bank Groups to support PESP.

== Achievements ==
The NBSSI has trained about 65,000 youth through innovation hubs and apprenticeship programs.

It has disbursed about GHC45 million as loans.

It has provided business acceleration services to 254 SMEs through KAIZEN.

It has also linked businesses to funding and international exports markets.

It has established over 13,000 new businesses.

The NBSSI claimed it plans to formalize the activities of SMEs through digital means. It also claimed it has received some funds to help about 500 businesses to scale-up their startups to digital platforms.

== Support scheme ==
On 19 May 2020, the president Nana Akufo-Addo launched the CAPBuSS which was provided by the Government of Ghana and other organizations to micro, small and medium-scale businesses across Ghana.

The executive director of NBSSI claimed there was an approval for the disbursement of stimulus packages to over 1,000 private schools in the country. In January, they decided to end the disbursement of funds to SMEs.

The NBSSI in partnership with the MasterCard Foundation launched the Nkosuo Program for the support of both formal and informal sectors who were affected by COVID-19 pandemic.

It was disclosed some hoteliers submitted names of their family members to access the COVID-19 stimulus package by the Government.

According to the Executive Secretary, more than 21,800 jobs were created under the government's CAPBuSS mainly owned by the youth.

The executive director of NBSSI said they were focusing on helping female entrepreneurs begin their businesses to be strong due to the impact of the COVID-19 pandemic.

The NBSSI gave start-up kits to young business peoples in the Bono region to help scale their businesses.

The NBSSI disbursed funds under the CAP BuSS to over 300,000 businesses in Ghana.

The NBSSI was directed by President Nana Akufo-Addo to offer financial support to traders who lost their goods to a fire outbreak at the Odawna Market.

The GEA in support with the World Bank launched the Persons With Disabilities (PWD) Enterprise Support Programme PESP in June, 2023.

The GEA is embarking on a programme to support WOMEN and YOUTH IN MSME.

== Conversion ==
It was claimed the Parliament of Ghana approved the Ghana Enterprises Agency Bill under a certificate of urgency. The NBSSI was converted into the Ghana Enterprises Agency to oversee, coordinate, promote and develop Micro, Small and Medium Enterprises (MSMEs).

== Controversies ==
The NBSSI denied it was charging fees from applicants to process the CAPBuSS. It was reported some organizations and individuals were charging fees from applicants before they were allowed to access the funds. It also denied contracting any organization to charge processing fees in a statement.

An organization of private schools claimed the NBSSI refused to give them the full amount agreed in the package. They claimed their members were given a lower amount than they requested.
