= List of central business districts =

The following is a list of central business districts (CBDs).

== Africa ==
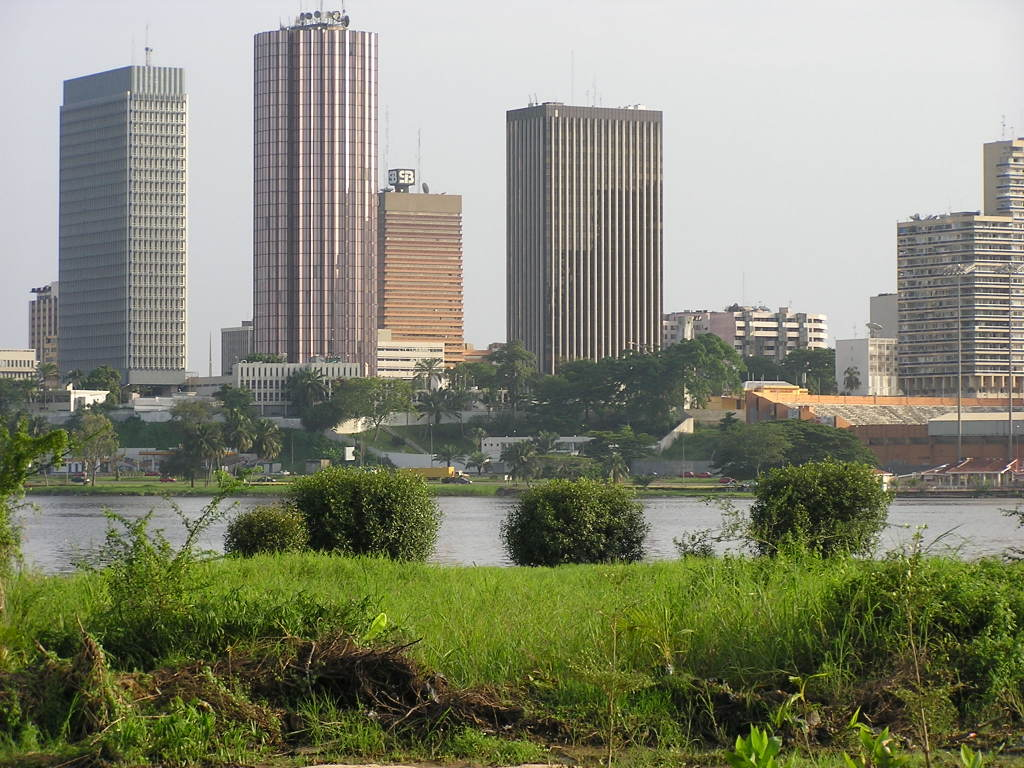
Le Plateau, Abidjan, Côte d'Ivoire

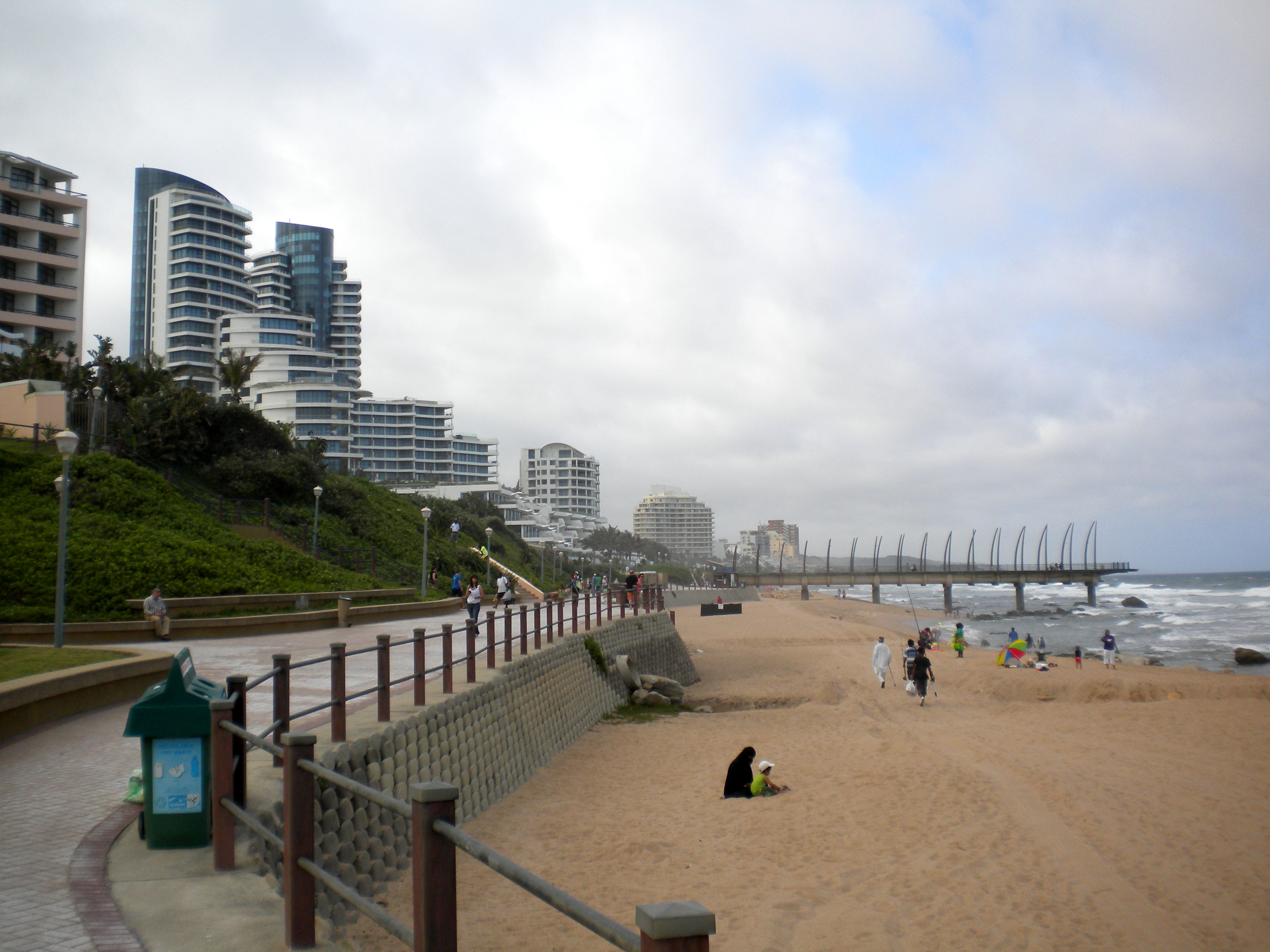
Umhlanga, near Durban, South Africa

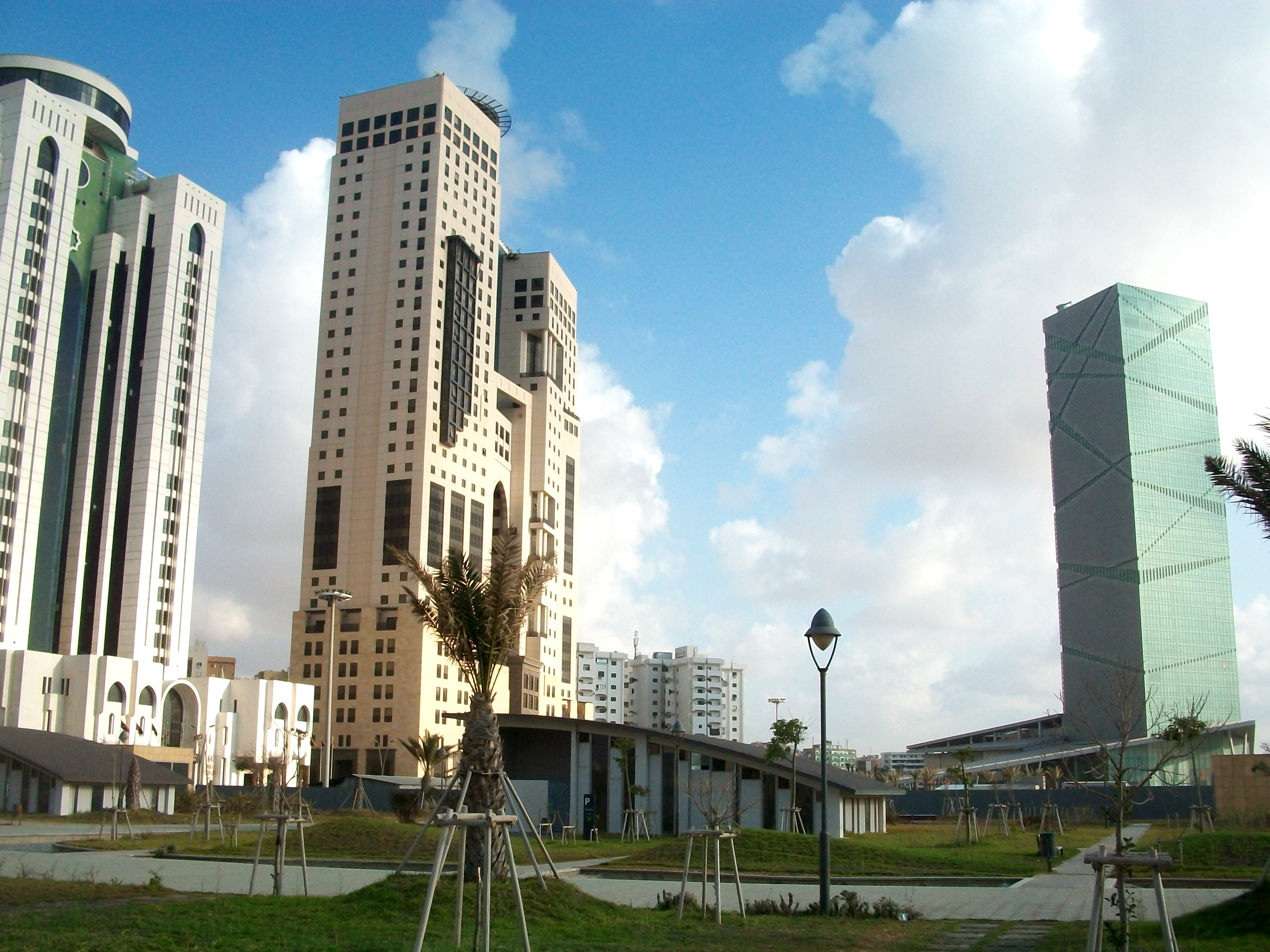
Central Business District, Tripoli, Libya

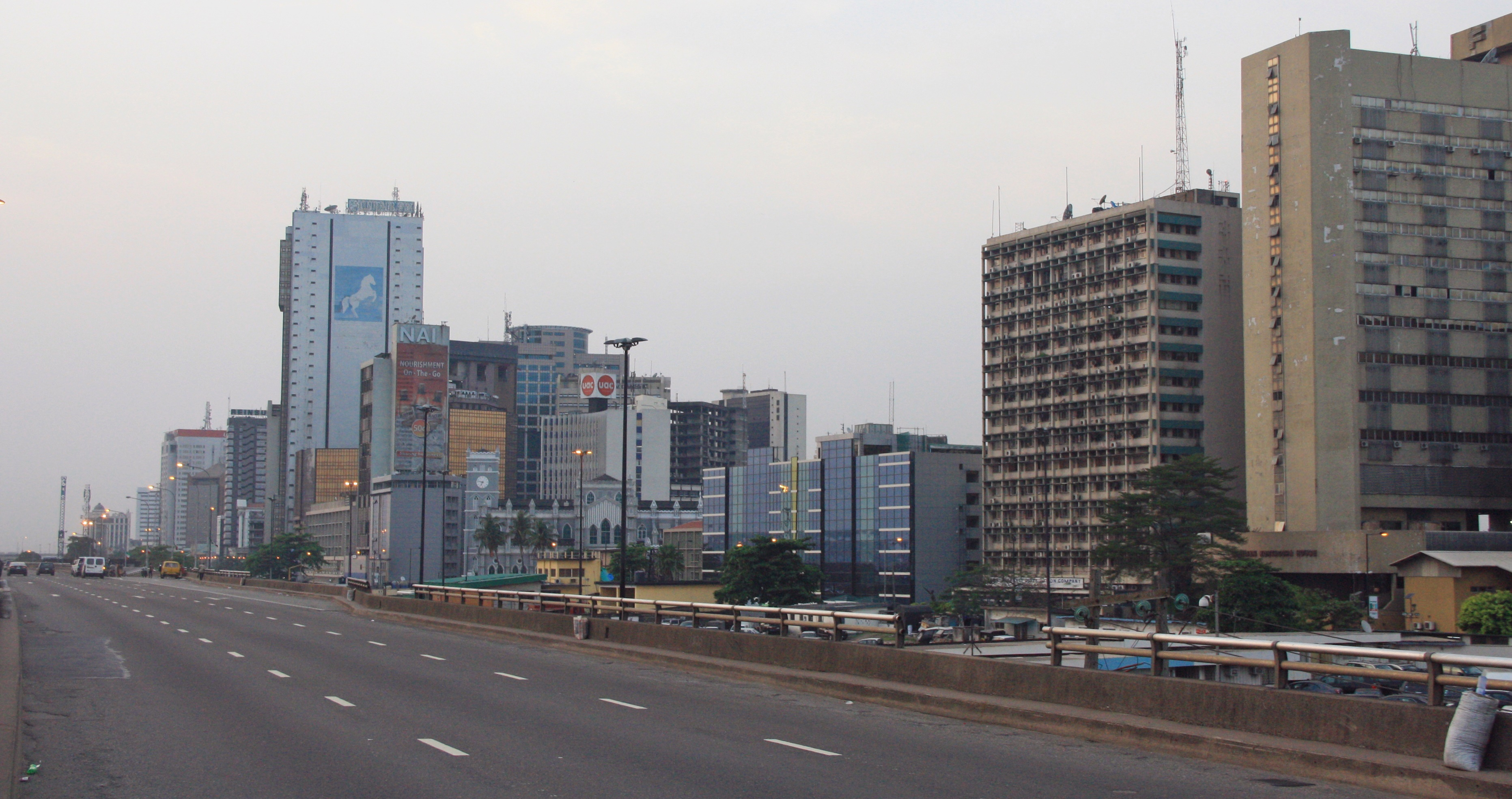
Banks in Lagos Island, Lagos, Nigeria

iTowers of Masa Square CBD, Gaborone, Botswana

City	Country	Business district
Abidjan	Ivory Coast	Le Plateau
Abuja	Nigeria	Central District
Accra	Ghana	Accra Central Business District (West Ridge, North Ridge, Osu Tudu, Victoriaborg), Airport City
Addis Ababa	Ethiopia	Gofa Sefer
Alexandria	Egypt	Downtown
Algiers	Algeria	Bab Ezzouar
Bloemfontein	South Africa	Bloemfontein Central
Cairo	Egypt	Central Business District
Cape Town	South Africa	Central Business District, Century City, Claremont, Bellville
Casablanca	Morocco	Boulevard Des FAR, Twin Center, Province of Nouaceur
Dakar	Senegal	Plateau
Dar es Salaam	Tanzania	Ilala
Douala	Cameroon	Bonanjo
Durban	South Africa	Central Business District, Pinetown, uMhlanga
Gaborone	Botswana	iTowers of Masa Square CBD
Harare	Zimbabwe	Downtown
Johannesburg	South Africa	Central Business District, Sandton, Rosebank, Marlboro, Kempton Park, Midrand
Kampala	Uganda	Nakasero
Khartoum	Sudan	Downtown
Kinshasa	DR Congo	La Gombe
Lagos	Nigeria	Victoria Island, Lagos Island, Eko
Luanda	Angola	Ingombota
Maputo	Mozambique	Downtown
Mombasa	Kenya	Mombasa Island
Monrovia	Liberia	Downtown/Central
Nairobi	Kenya	Central Business District, Upper Hill
Port Louis	Mauritius	Area around Caudan Waterfront
Pretoria	South Africa	Central Business District, Hatfield, Centurion
Tripoli	Libya	Central Business District
Tunis	Tunisia	Avenue Habib Bourguiba, Avenue Mohammed-V, Centre Urbain Nord
Windhoek	Namibia	Central Business District

== Asia ==
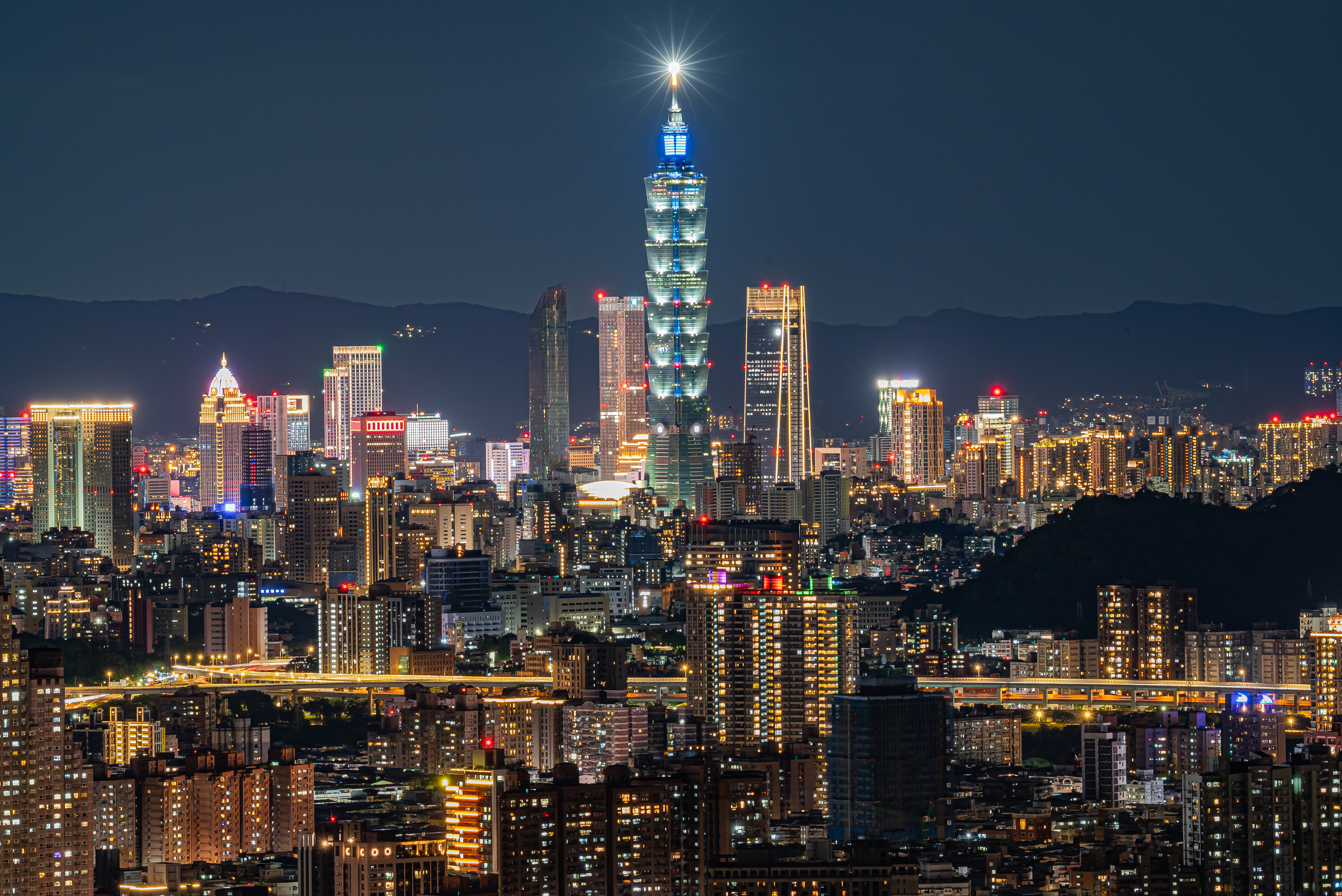
Taipei, Taiwan

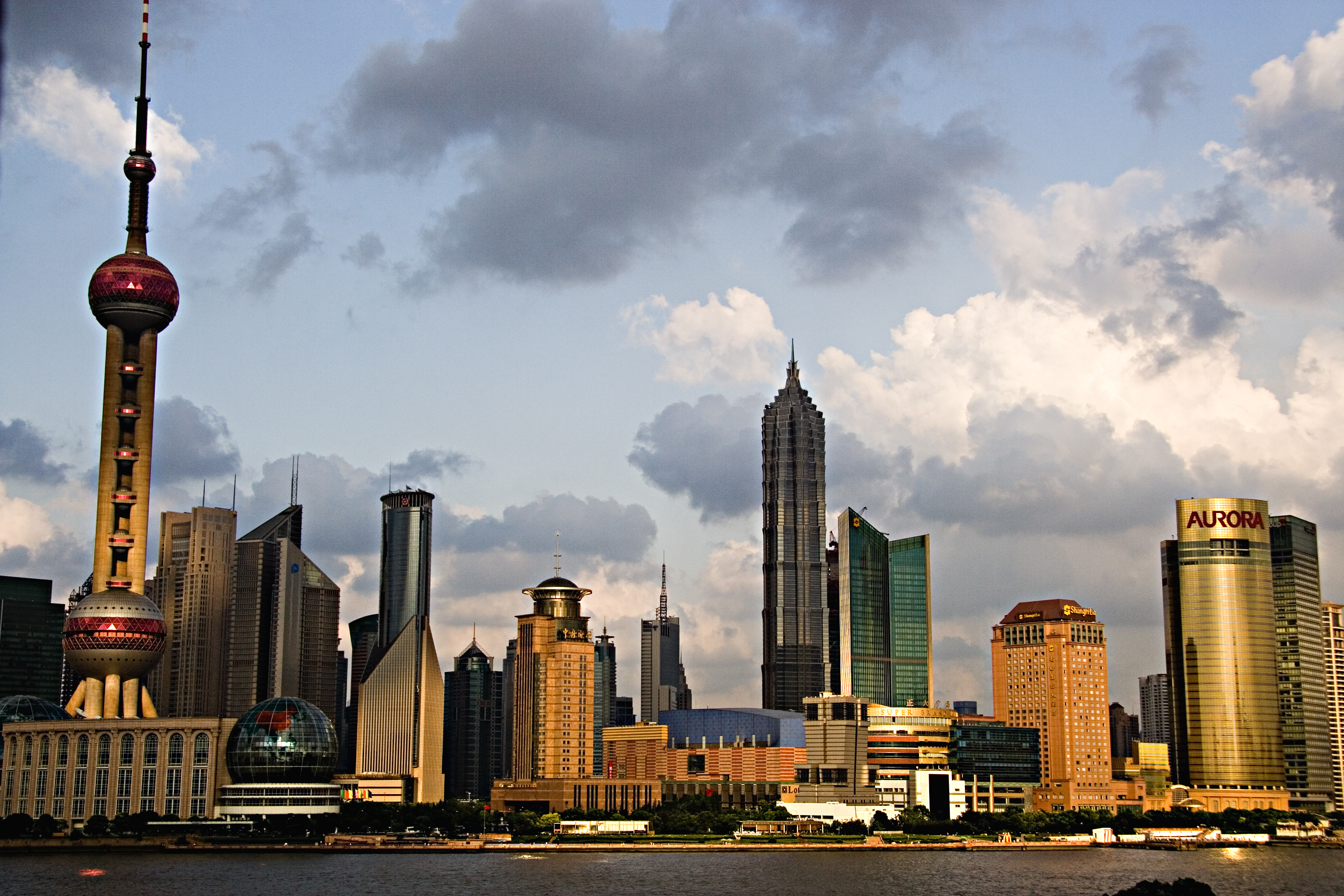
Shanghai, China

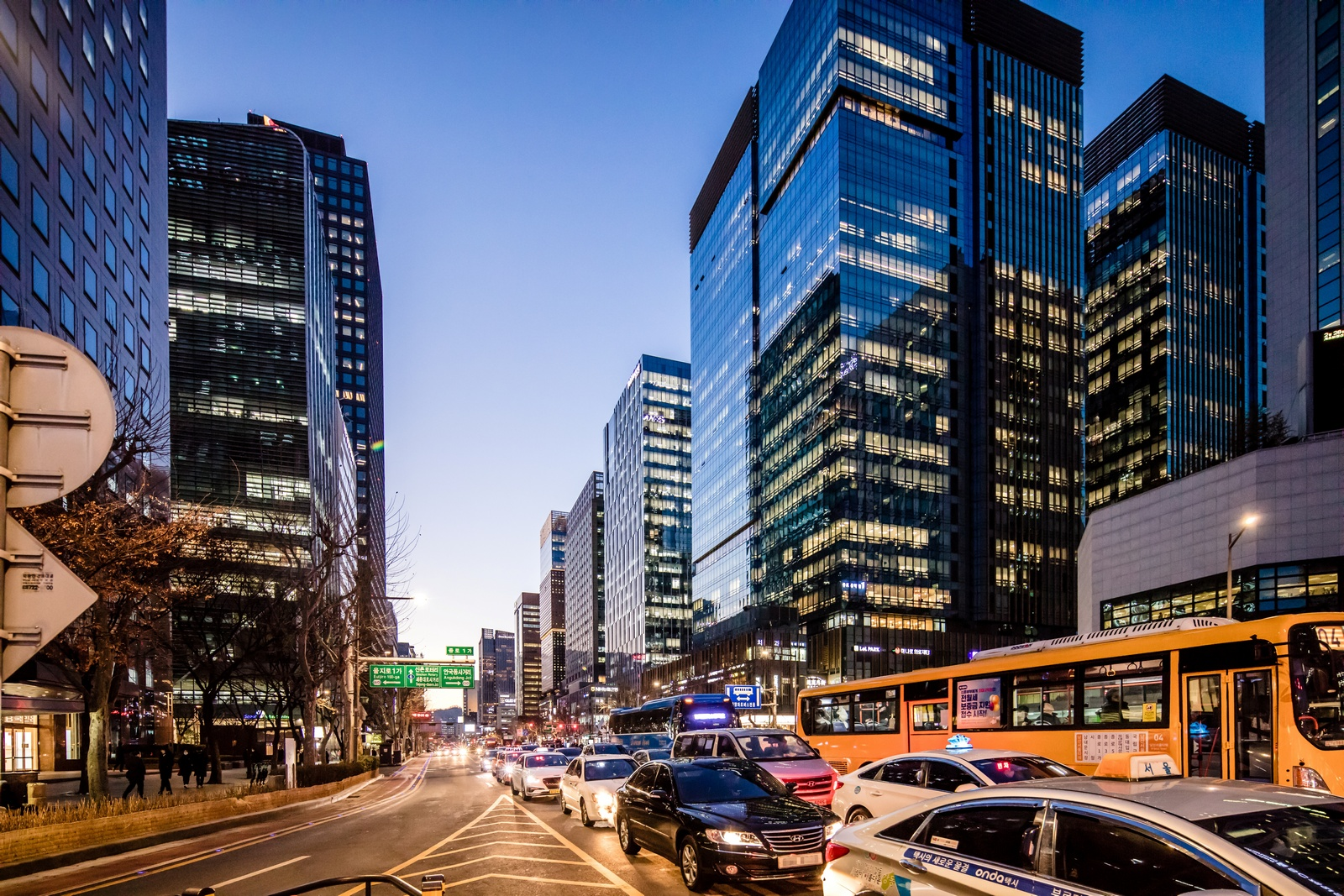
Downtown Seoul, RO Korea

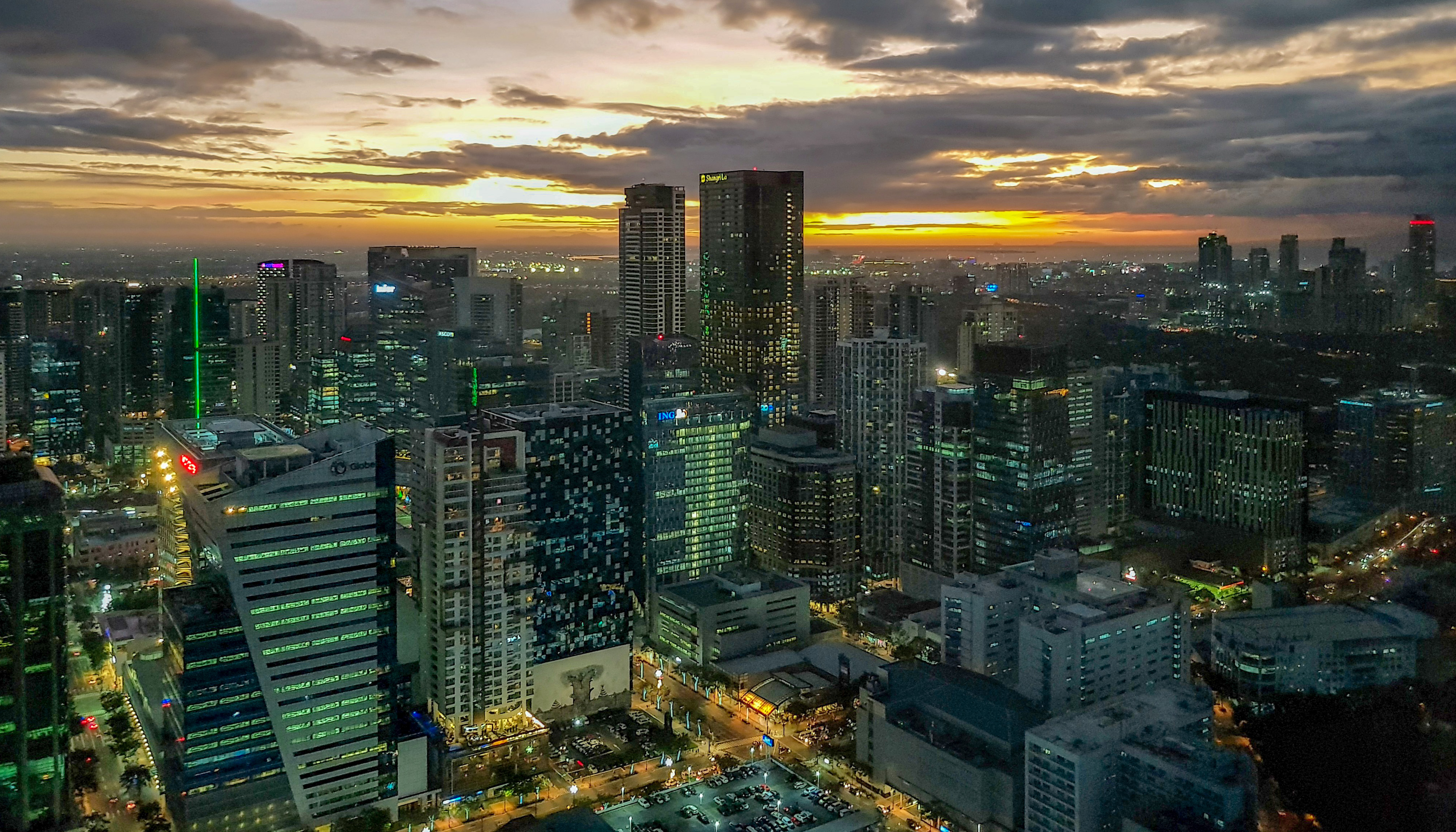
Bonifacio Global City, Taguig, Metro Manila, Philippines

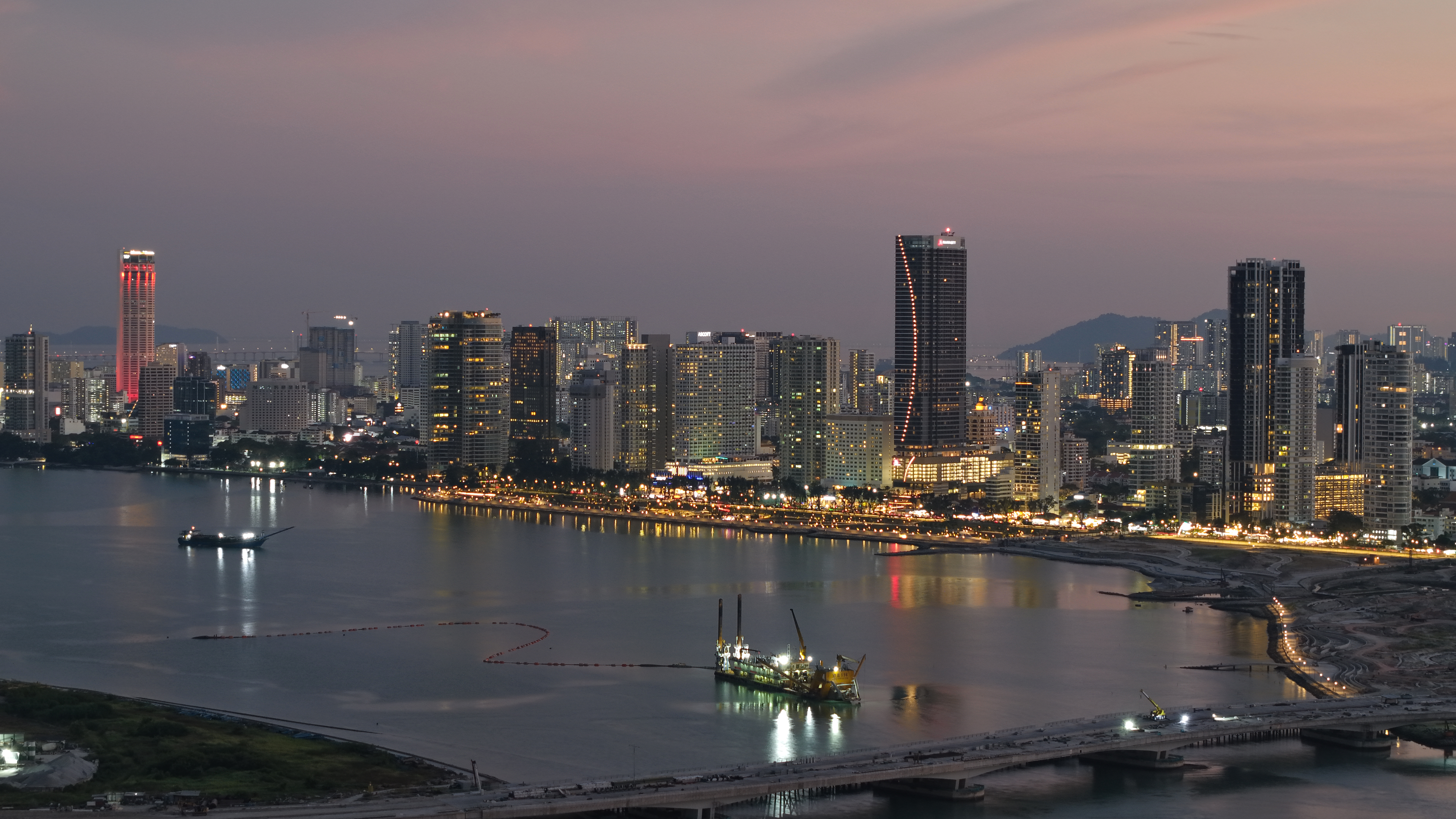
Central Business District, George Town, Malaysia

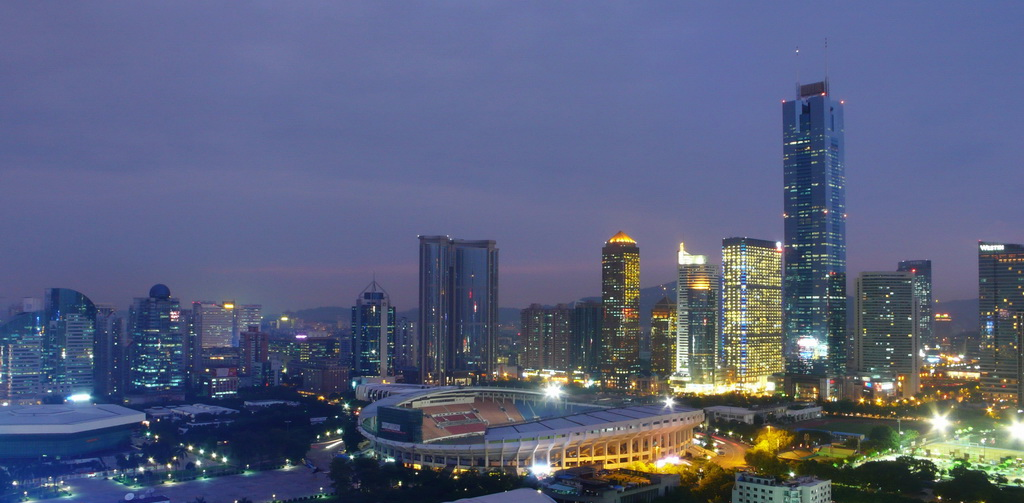
Guangzhou, China

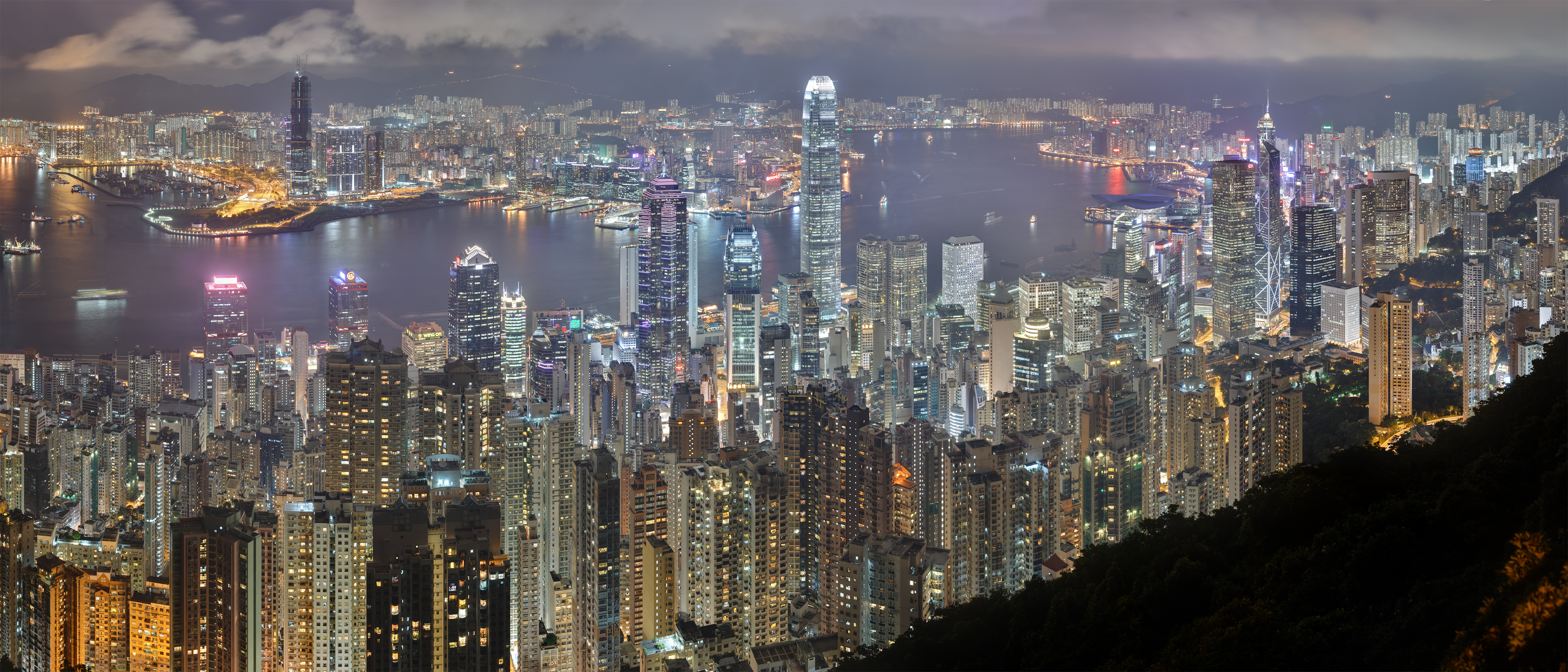
Hong Kong, China

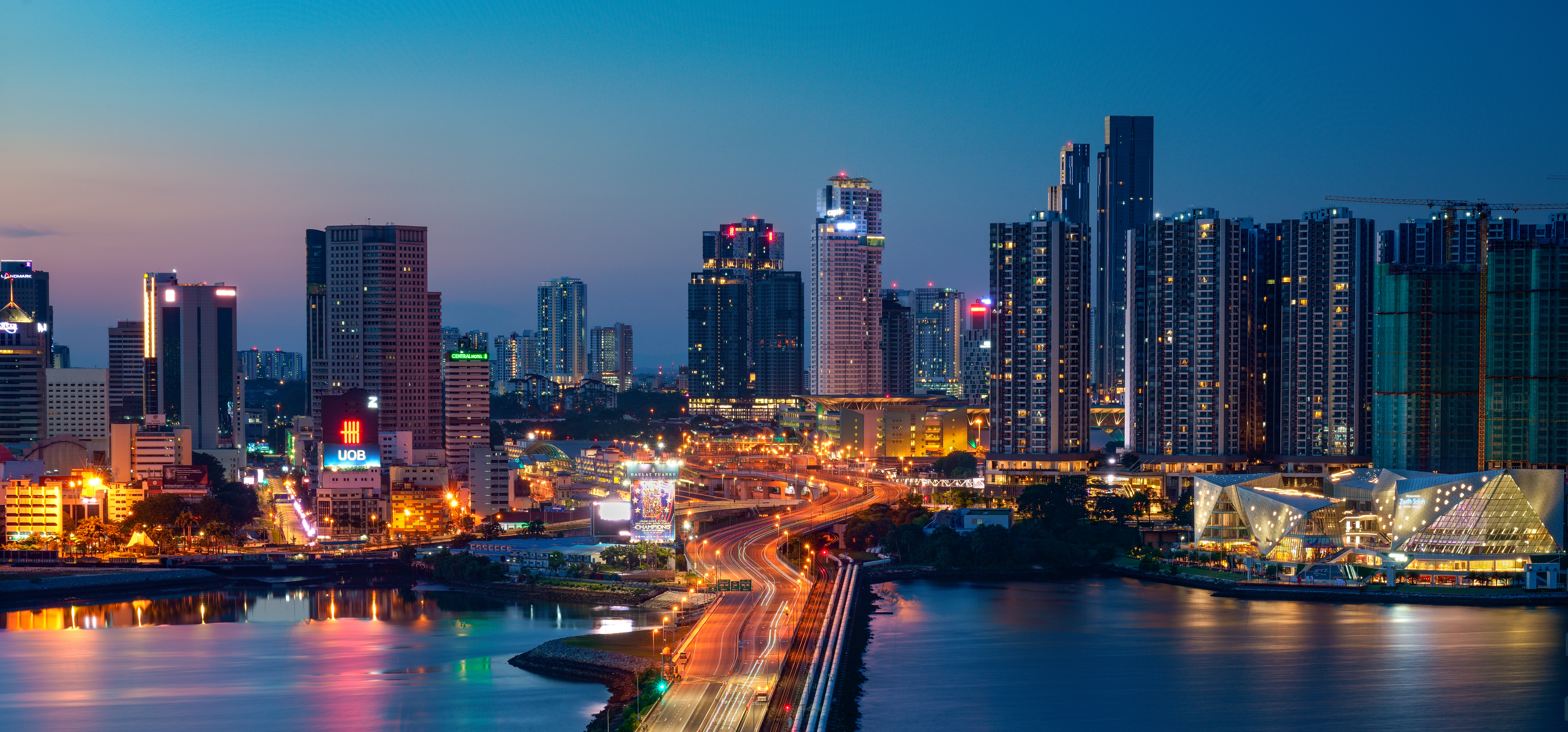
Johor Bahru Central Business District, Malaysia

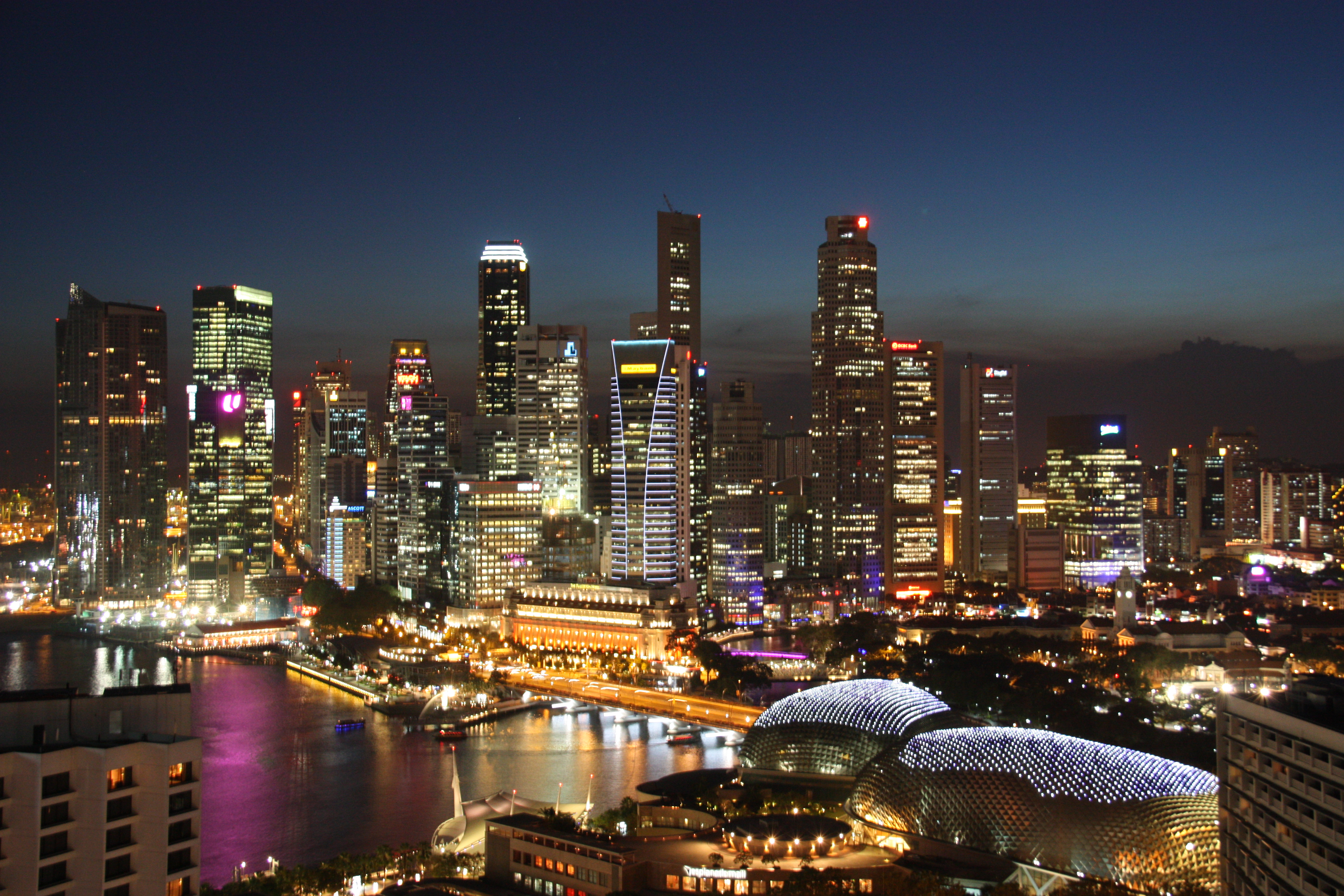
Downtown Core, Singapore

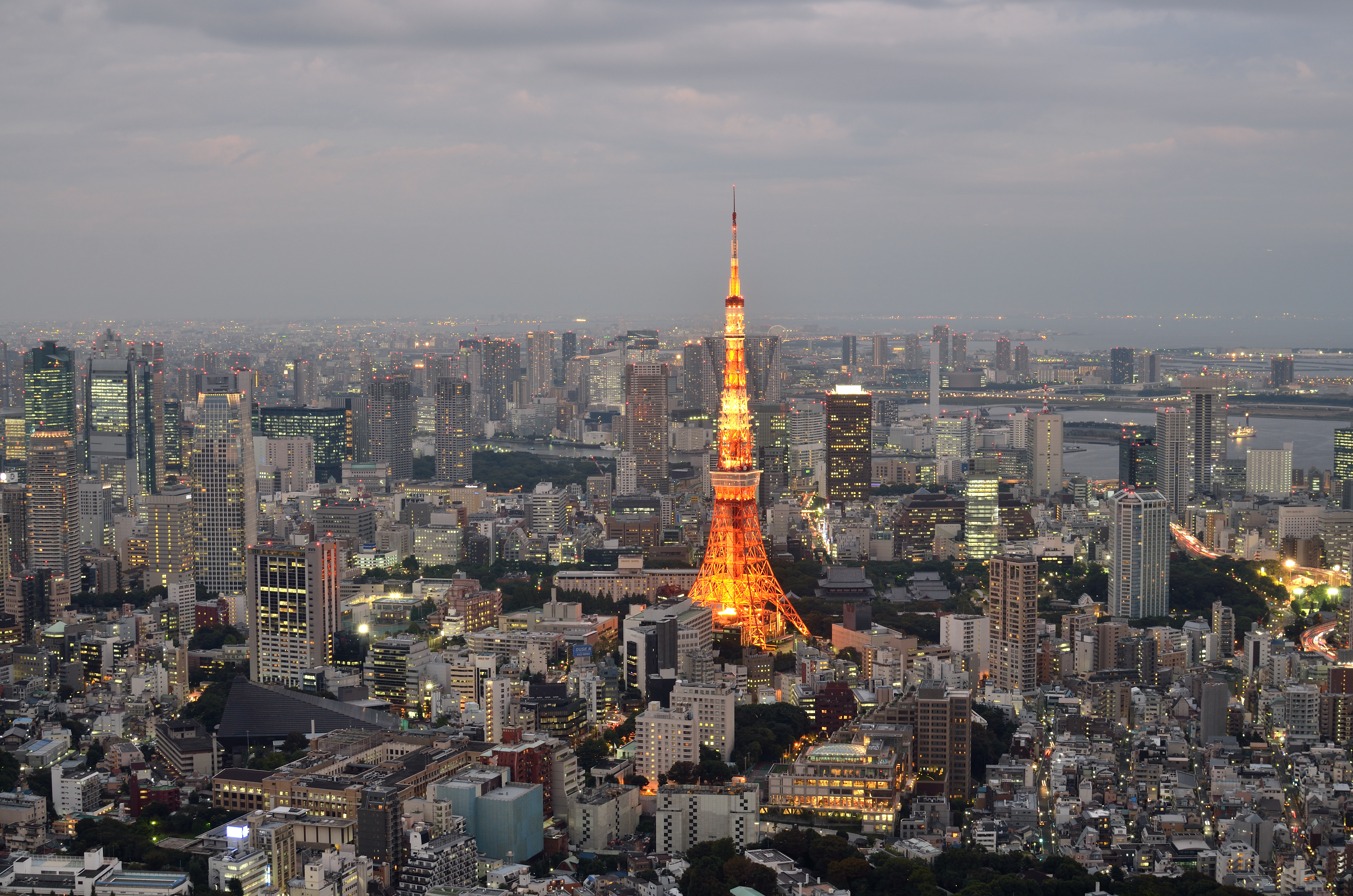
Tokyo, Japan

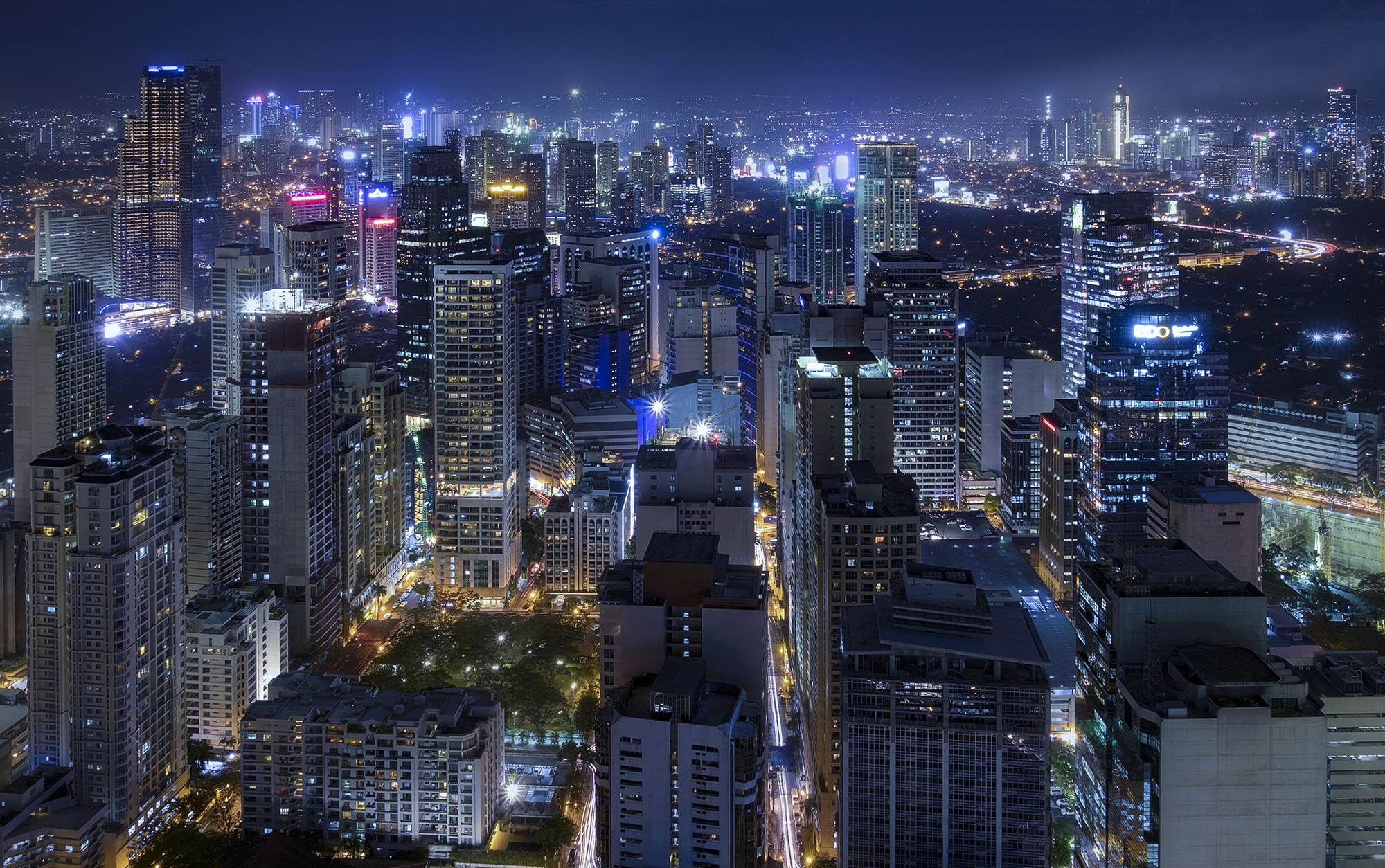
Makati CBD, Makati, Metro Manila, Philippines

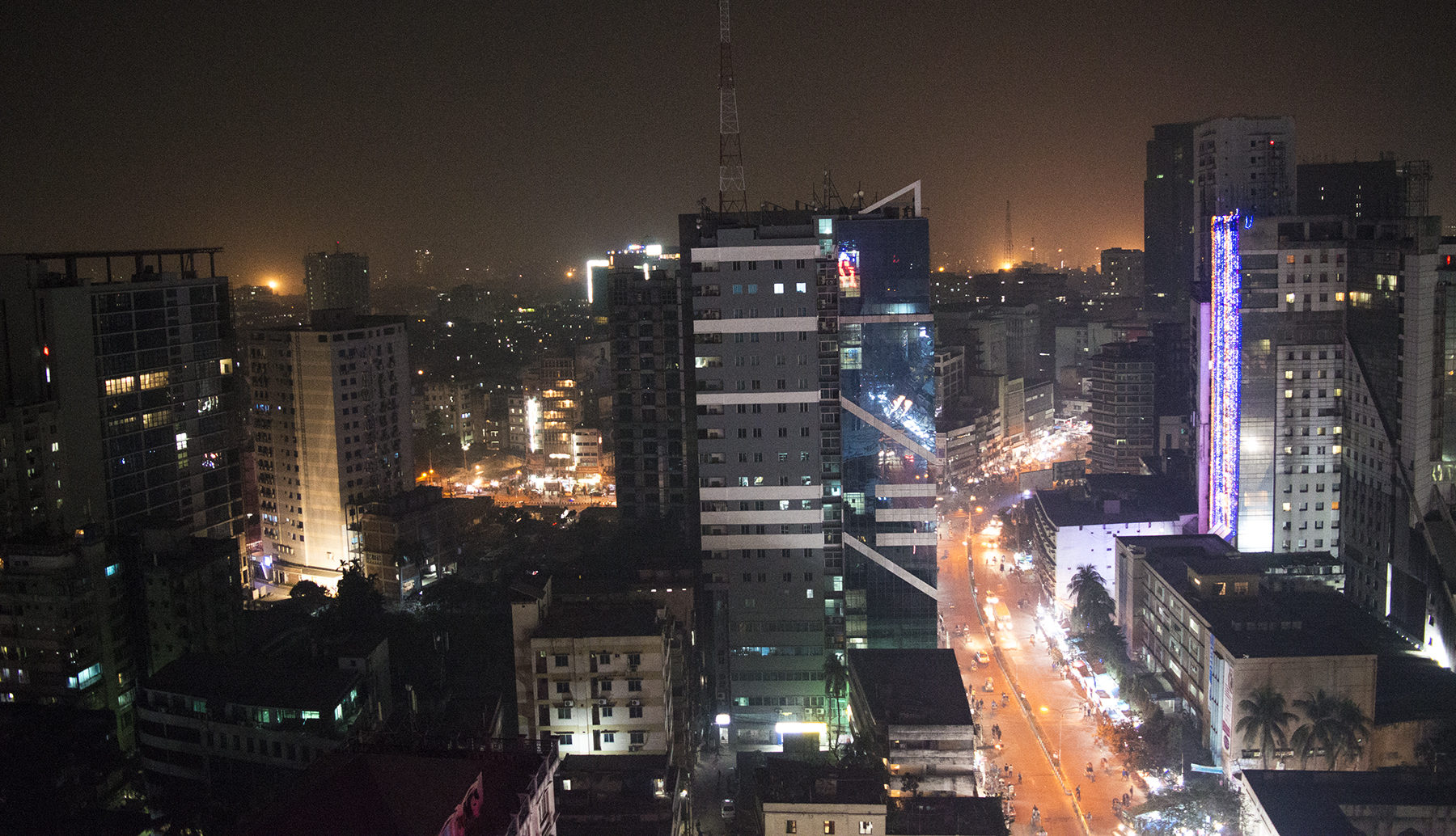
Dhaka, Bangladesh

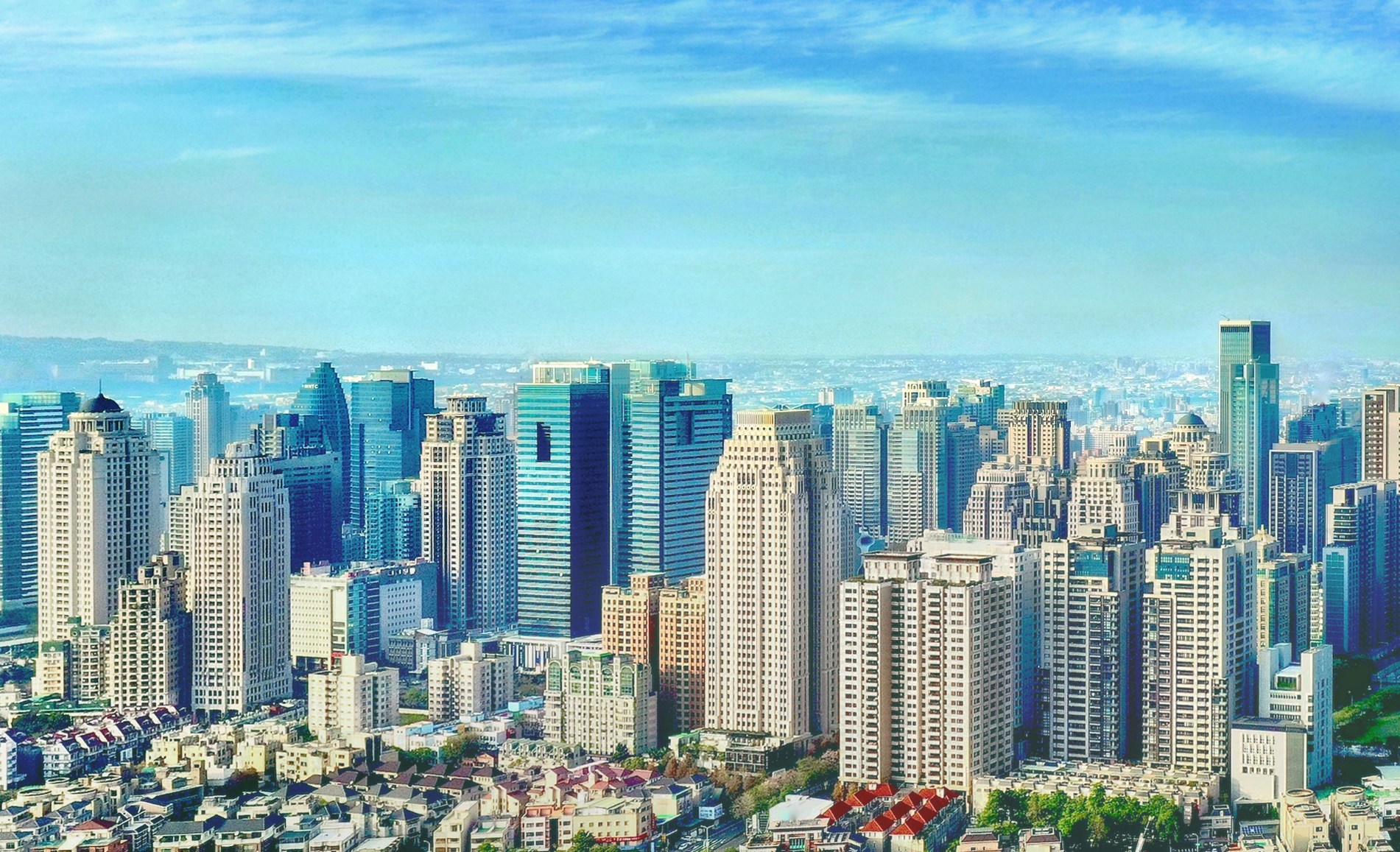
Taichung, Taiwan

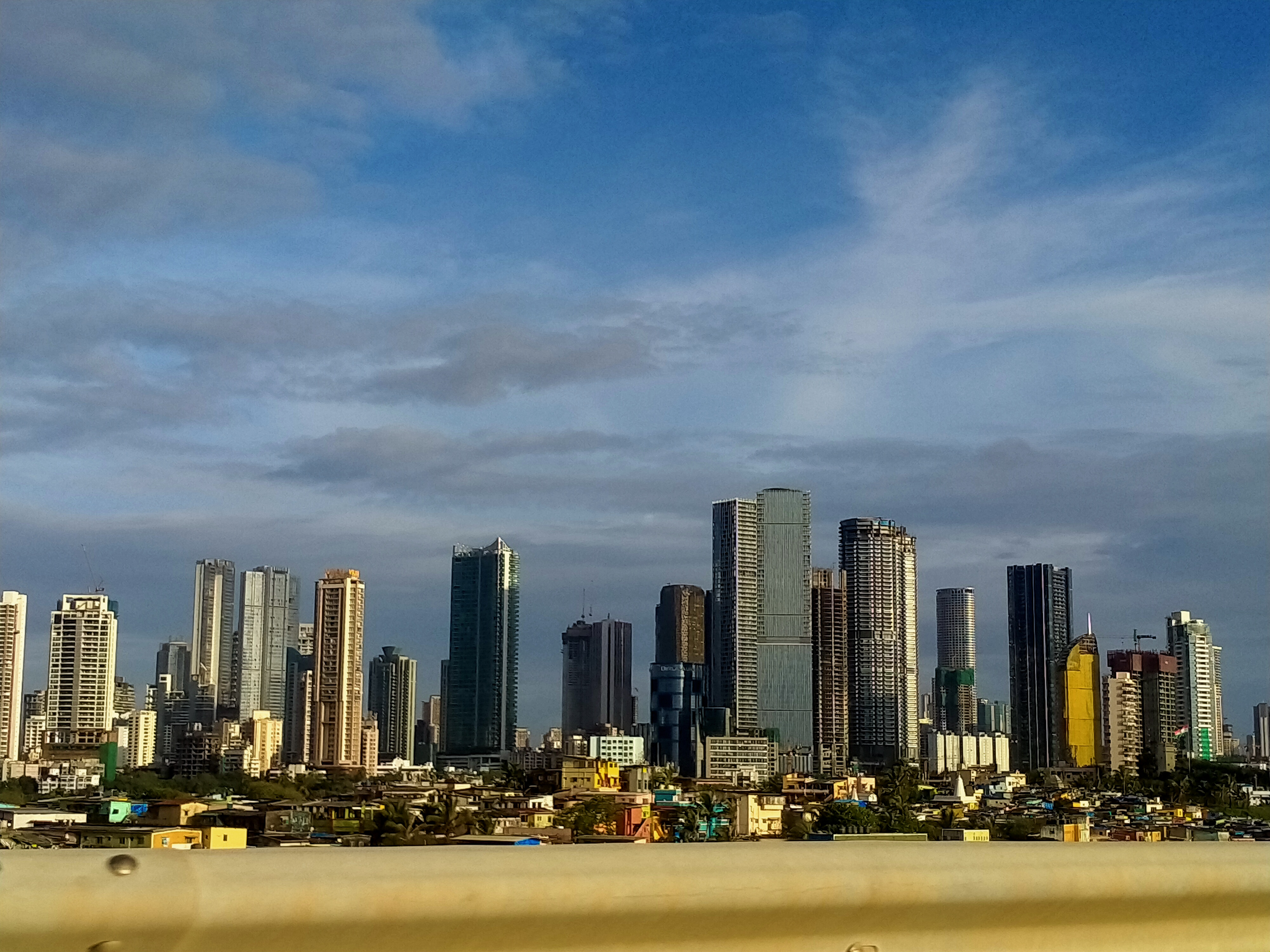
Mumbai, India

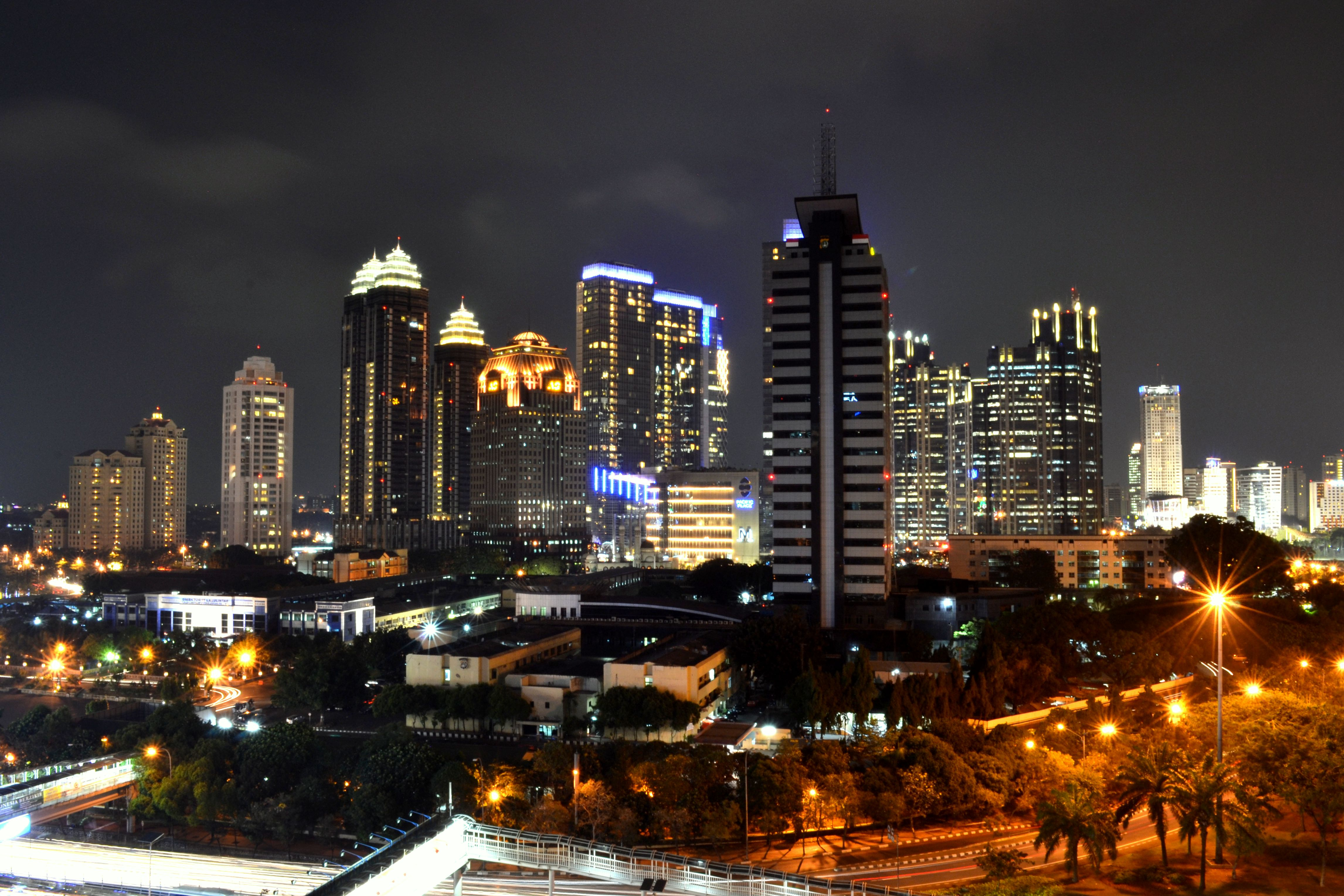
Jakarta, Indonesia

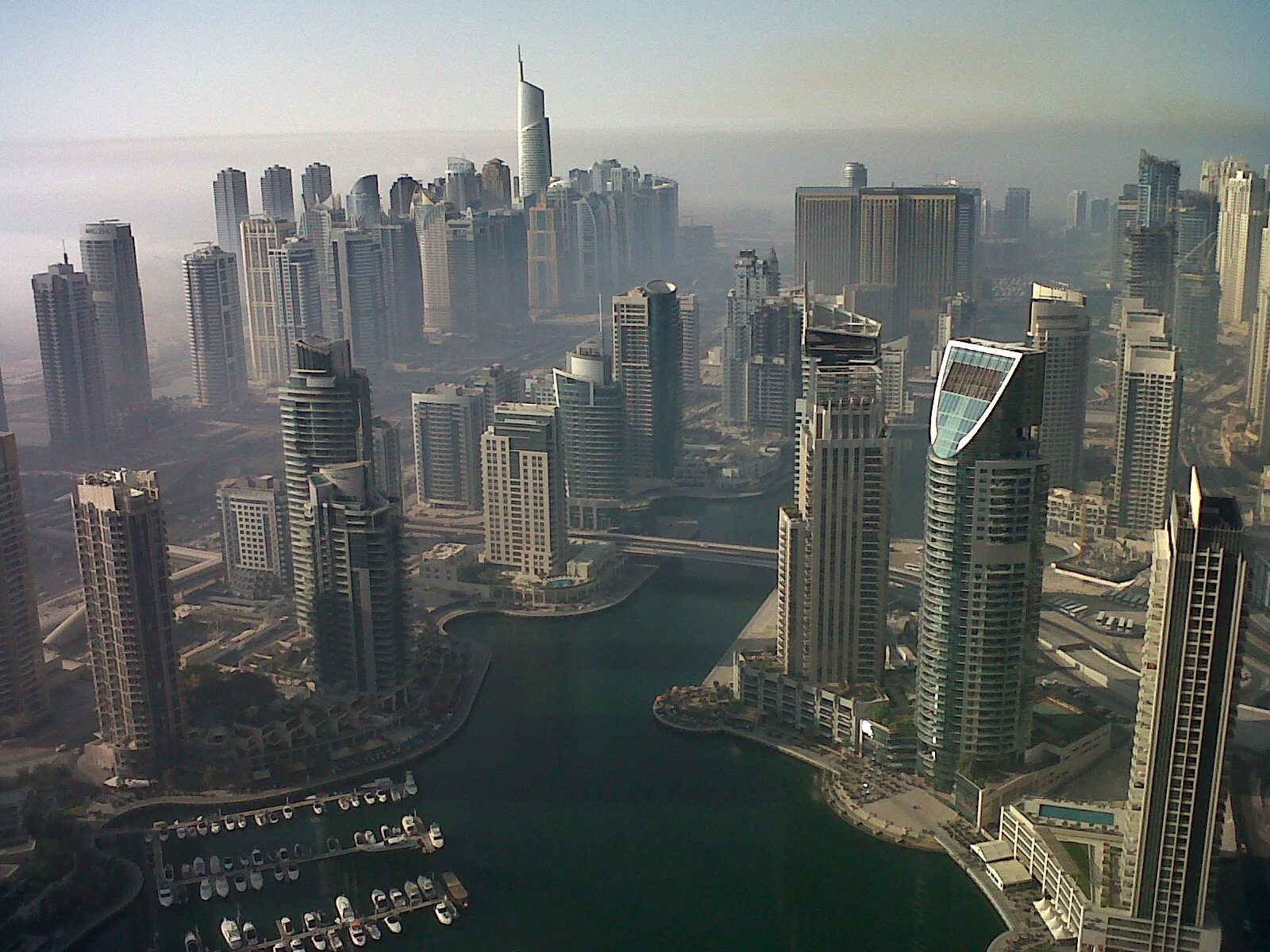
Dubai, United Arab Emirates

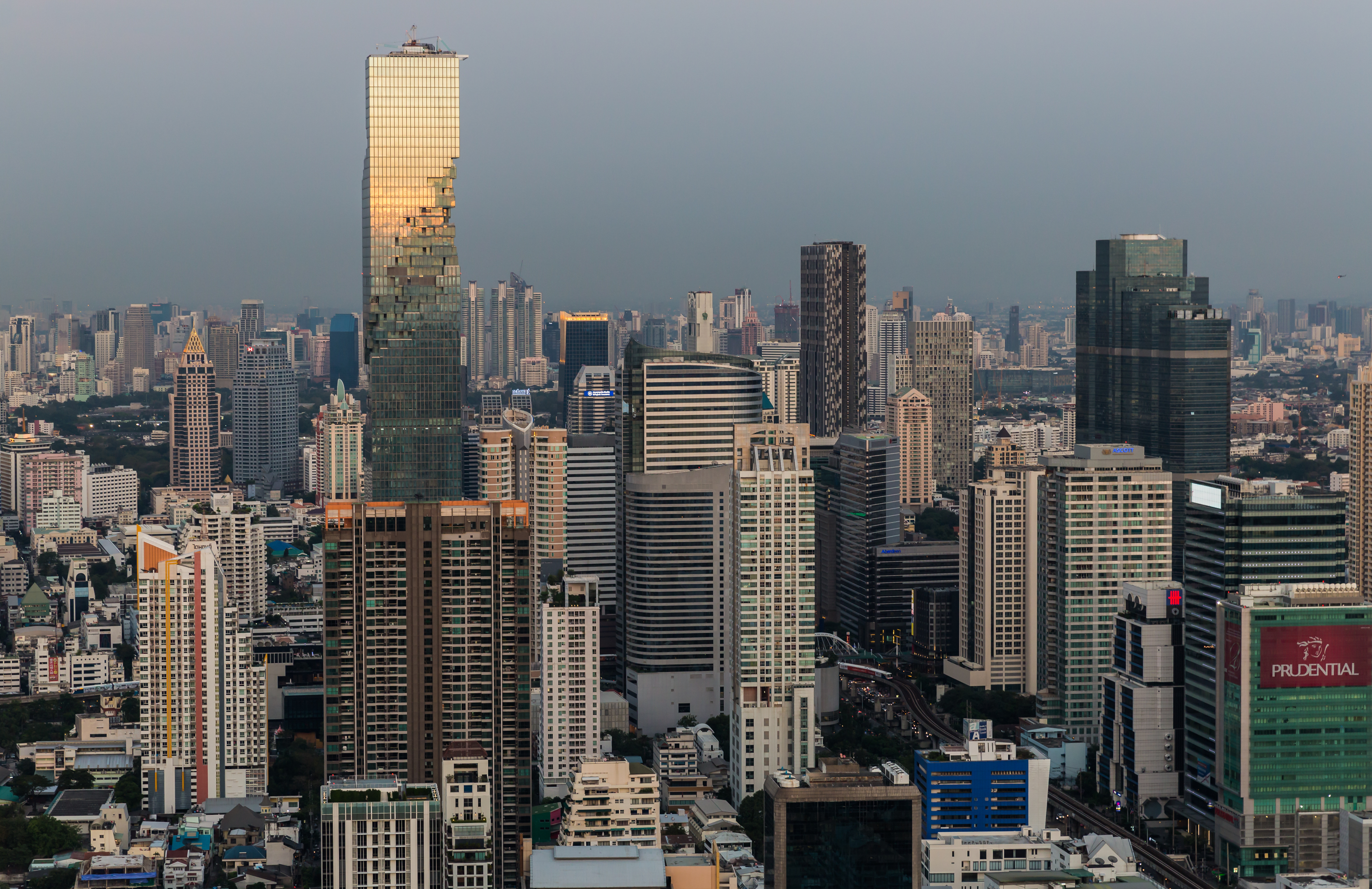
Bangkok, Thailand

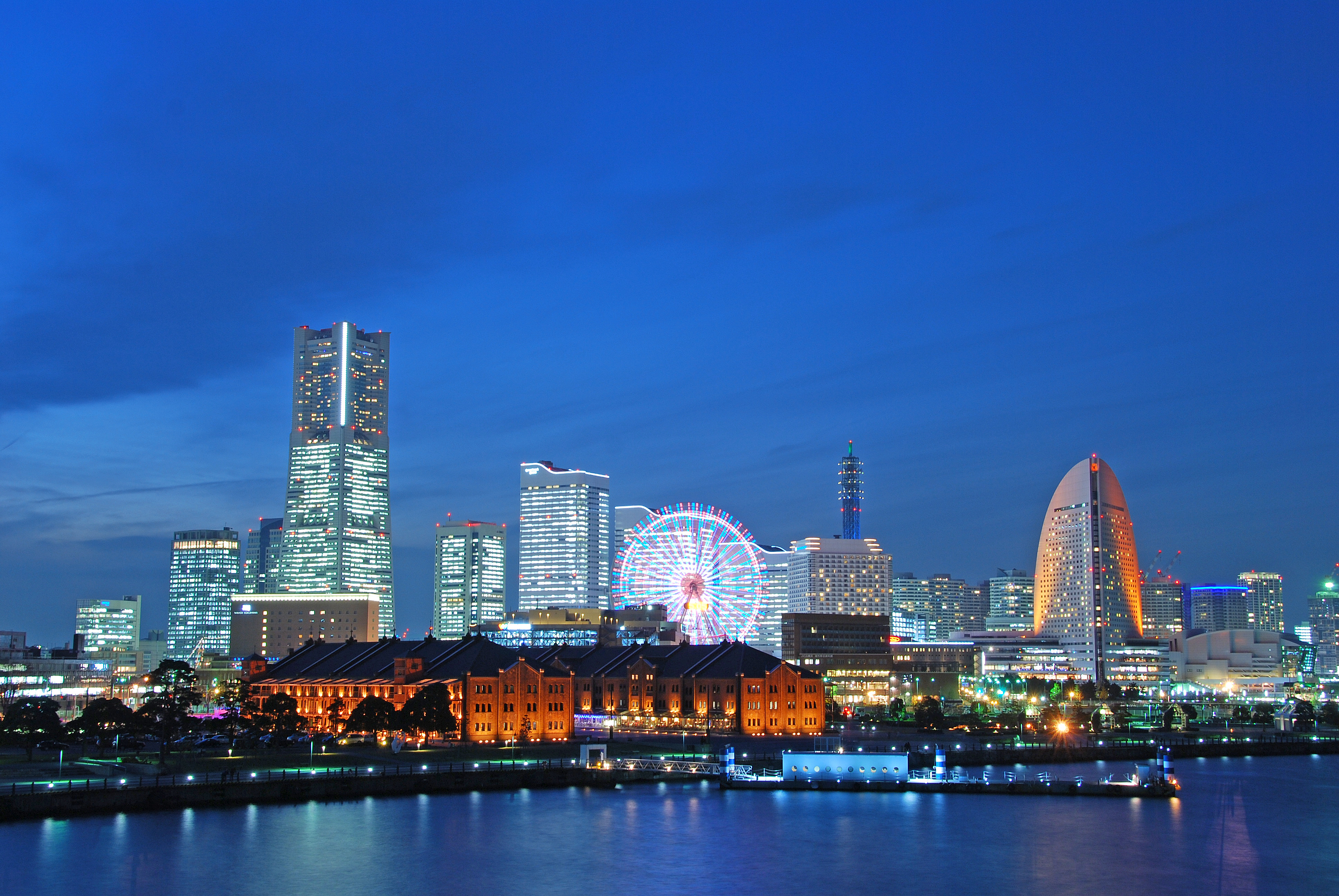
Yokohama, Japan

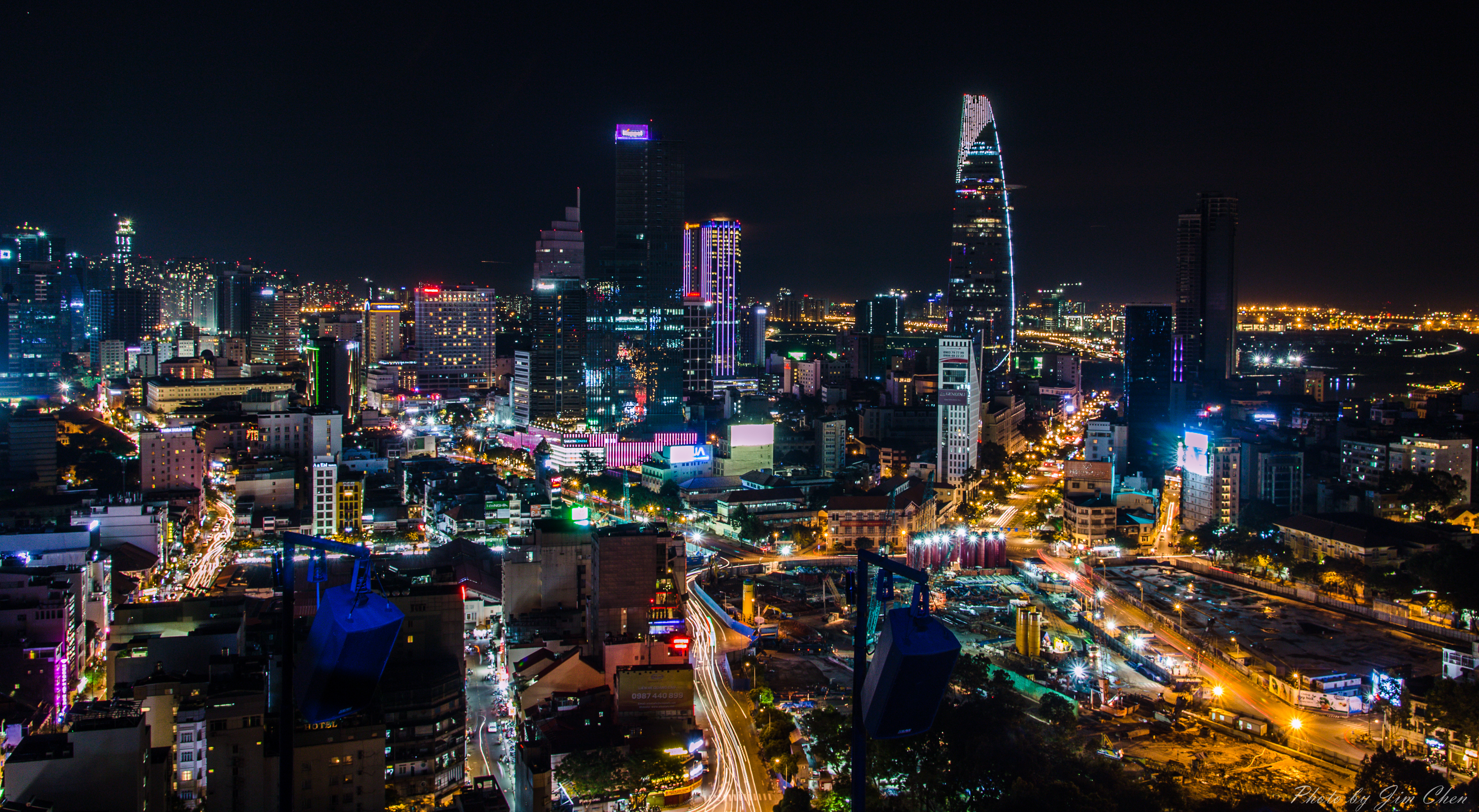
Ho Chi Minh City, Vietnam

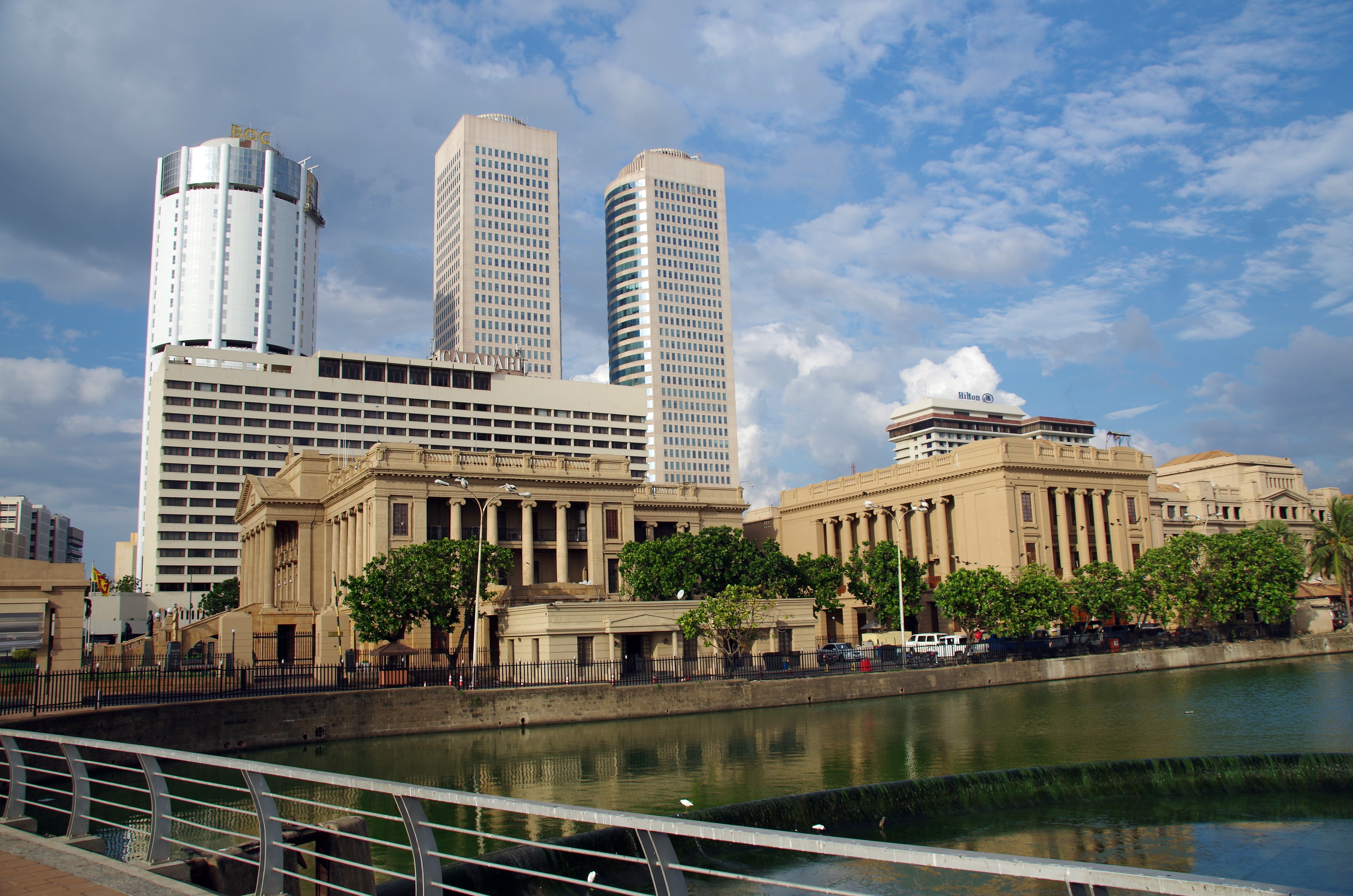
Colombo, Sri Lanka

City	Country	Business district
Abu Dhabi	United Arab Emirates	Al Maryah Island
Ahmedabad and Gandhinagar	India	Gujarat International Finance Tec-City
Almaty	Kazakhstan	Almaly District, around Panfilov Park
Amman	Jordan	Abdali
Ankara	Turkey	Çankaya District (Söğütözü and Çukurambar neighborhoods)
Bacolod	Philippines	Capitol Central, The Upper East
Baku	Azerbaijan	Sabail, Keshla
Bangalore	India	MG Road, Shivajinagar, Bangalore Central Business District (around Vidhan Soudha), Electronic City, Whitefield
Bandung	Indonesia	Asia-Africa
Bangkok	Thailand	Core CBDs: Sathon, Si Lom, Phloen Chit, Asok New CBDs: Rama IX (Phra Ram 9), Phetchaburi
Beijing	China	Beijing CBD and Beijing Financial Street
Bhopal	India	Shrishti CBD, New Market, MP Nagar
Beirut	Lebanon	Hamra Street, Beirut Central District
Bokaro Steel City	India	City Centre, Bokaro, Sector 4 (Bokaro) and Chas
Busan	RO Korea	Busanjin, Jung, Haeundae
Cagayan de Oro	Philippines	Downtown
Can Tho	Vietnam	Ninh Kieu District
Chandigarh	India	Sector 17
Chennai	India	Anna Salai, T Nagar, Parry's Corner, Nungambakkam
Chiang Mai	Thailand	Chang Khlan Road (Chiang Mai Night Bazaar), Airport Business Park, Chiang Mai Business Park
Chiba	Japan	Chūō-ku, Mihama
Chittagong	Bangladesh	Agrabad
Chongqing	China	Jeifangbei Downtown, Jiangbei New City CBD
Coimbatore	India	Avinashi Road, Gandhipuram, RS Puram
Colombo	Sri Lanka	Fort, Port City Colombo
Davao City	Philippines	Davao Park District, Abreeza Ayala Center, Azuela Cove, Pryce Business Park, Davao Global Township
Daegu	RO Korea	Jung, Daegu-Gyeongbuk Free Economic Zone
Daejeon	RO Korea	Jung, Seo (Dunsan)
Dalian	China	Dalian CBD
Da Nang	Vietnam	Hai Chau District, Sơn Trà District
Dhaka	Bangladesh	Motijheel, Kawran Bazar-Panthapath, Dhanmondi, Paltan, Tejgaon I/A, Gulistan, Gulshan-Banani/DOHS, Jatrabari, Shantinagar, Mirpur/DOHS, Mogbazar, Old Dhaka (including Wari, Sadarghat, Nawbpur, Chawk Bazar and Kotwali), Mohakhali/DOHS
Doha	Qatar	West Bay
Dubai	United Arab Emirates	Downtown, Jumeirah Lake Towers, Business Bay, Dubai Media City
Erbil	Iraq	Martyr Akram Overpass
Faisalabad	Pakistan	D Ground
Fukuoka	Japan	Chūō-ku (Tenjin, Daimyō), Hakata-ku (Nakasu, Canal City Hakata, Area around Hakata Station)
George Town	Malaysia	George Town Central Business District
Guangzhou	China	Tianhe (Zhujiang New Town), Yuexiu
Gurugram	India	Cyber City, Golf Course Road, Sector 30, Sector 28 (MG Road Area)
Hai Phong	Vietnam	Ngo Quyen District
Hanoi	Vietnam	Hoàn Kiếm district, Ba Đình District, Tây Hồ District, Cầu Giấy District
Hatyai	Thailand	Hatyai Nai
Hefei	China	New CBD: Swan Lake CBD Traditional CBD: Luyang District
Ho Chi Minh City	Vietnam	District 1, District 3, Phú Nhuận District, Bình Thạnh District, Thủ Thiêm new urban area, Phú Mỹ Hưng New Urban Area – C & CR District
Hong Kong	Hong Kong	Central, Wan Chai, Admiralty, West Kowloon, Tsim Sha Tsui, Kwun Tong
Hiroshima	Japan	Naka
Hyderabad	India	Nampally, HITEC City, Nanakramguda, Manikonda, Gachibowli, Koti, Himayatnagar, Basheerbagh and Abids
Iloilo City	Philippines	Downtown, Iloilo Business Park, Atria Park District, Smallville Business Complex
Incheon	RO Korea	Jung, Incheon Free Economic Zone (Songdo International City, Yeongjong Island, Cheongna)
Islamabad	Pakistan	Jinnah Avenue, Blue Area
Istanbul	Turkey	Istanbul Central Business District (Levent and Maslak neighborhoods), Istanbul Financial Center, Ataşehir
Izmir	Turkey	Bayraklı District
Jakarta	Indonesia	Golden Triangle of Jakarta (including Mega Kuningan and Sudirman Central Business District)
Jerusalem	Israel	Jaffa Road, Downtown Triangle
Johor Bahru	Malaysia	Johor Bahru Central Business District, located in Jalan Wong Ah Fook, near the Johor-Singapore Causeway
Kaohsiung	Taiwan	Asia New Bay Area, Cianjin, Lingya, Sinsing
Karachi	Pakistan	Serai Quarter, Shara-e-Faisal, Clifton
Kobe	Japan	Chūō-ku, Port Island, Hyōgo-ku, Rokkō Island, Area around Kōbe Station
Kochi	India	Area around M.G Road, Edappally Lulu International Shopping Mall
Kolkata	India	Located in B.B.D. Bagh and Esplanade
Kota Kinabalu	Malaysia	Kota Kinabalu Central Business District
Kuala Lumpur	Malaysia	Kuala Lumpur City Centre, Tun Razak Exchange, Bukit Bintang, Jalan Tunku Abdul Rahman, Jalan Raja Chulan, Damansara Town Centre, Mid Valley City and KL Sentral
Kuching	Malaysia	Downtown Kuching
Kyoto	Japan	Nakagyō (Shijō Kawaramachi), Shimogyō (Area around Kyoto Tower and Kyōto Station)
Laguna	Philippines	Southwoods City, Nuvali, Greenfield
Lahore	Pakistan	Lahore CBD, Ferozepur Road, M. M. Alam road, Gulberg, Lahore
Medan	Indonesia	Medan Barat, Medan Petisah, Medan Polonia
Metro Cebu	Philippines	Downtown, Cebu Park District (Cebu Business Park, Cebu IT Park), South Road Properties, Mandani Bay, The Mactan Newtown
Metro Clark	Philippines	Clark Global City, New Clark City
Metro Manila	Philippines	Core CBDs: Makati CBD, Ortigas Center, Bonifacio Global City Secondary CBDs: Alabang (Filinvest City, Ayala Alabang), Bay City, Triangle Park, Arca South, Binondo CBD, Eastwood City, Araneta Center
Mumbai	India	Downtown Mumbai (Nariman Point - Cuffe Parade - Colaba - Fort), and Central Mumbai (Worli - Lower Parel - Mumbai Central area combined), Bandra Kurla Complex (BKC)
Narayanganj	Bangladesh	Chashara
Navi Mumbai	India	CBD Belapur, Vashi, Dighe-Airoli
Nagoya	Japan	Naka (Sakae), Nakamura (Area around Nagoya Station)
New Delhi	India	Central Delhi (Connaught Place - Barakhamba Road), Aerocity, Nehru Place, Bhikaji Cama Place (RK Puram), Saket District Centre (Pushp Vihar), Netaji Subhash Place (Pitampura), Rajendra Place (Rajinder Nagar), Janakpuri District Centre, (Janakpuri).
New Taipei	Taiwan	Xinban Special District, Xinzhuang Sub-city Center, Sanchong District
Osaka	Japan	Shinimamiya (Umeda, Dōjima), Chūō-ku, Suminoe, Minato, Naniwa
Pattaya	Thailand	Pattaya Sai 1 and Sai 2
Petaling Jaya	Malaysia	Damansara Utama, Mutiara Damansara and Section 52
Pune	India	Shivajinagar, Koregaon Park, Hadaspar, Magarpatta, Baner, Hinjewadi
Qingdao	China	Shinan District, around May Fourth Square
Ramat Gan	Israel	Diamond Exchange District
Rawalpindi	Pakistan	Saddar, Rawalpindi
Riyadh	Saudi Arabia	King Abdullah Financial District
Roxas	Philippines	Pueblo de Panay
San Fernando	Philippines	Capital Town Pampanga
Sapporo	Japan	Chūō-ku
Sendai	Japan	Aoba
Seoul	RO Korea	Downtown Seoul, Gangnam, Yeouido
Shanghai	China	The Bund, Lujiazui, People's Square, Jing'an District, and Xujiahui
Shah Alam	Malaysia	Turmalin Castle
Shenzhen	China	Around Luohu District's Shennan East Road, Futian District, Lianhuashan Park Southern area till Shenzhen Convention and Exhibition Center, Nanshan DistrictHouhai company base and Qianhai Shenzhen-Hong Kong Modern Service Industry Cooperation Zone
Singapore	Singapore	Downtown Core
Surabaya	Indonesia	Tunjungan
Sylhet	Bangladesh	Zindabazar
Tagum	Philippines	Palm City
Taichung	Taiwan	7th Redevelopment Zone
Taipei	Taiwan	Xinyi Planning District, Nangang, Da'an, Datong, Taipei West District Gateway Project (Area around Taipei Main Station)
Taiyuan	China	Changfeng Business District
Taoyuan	Taiwan	Zhongzheng Arts and Cultural Business District, Qingpu Special District
Tashkent	Uzbekistan	Tashkent City IBC
Semarang	Indonesia	Simpang Lima City Center, Pemuda Central Business District, Gajahmada Golden Triangle
Tehran	Iran	Sadeghiyeh, Gheytarieh and Navvab (district)
Tel Aviv	Israel	Ayalon
Trivandrum	India	MG Road, East Fort
Tokyo	Japan	Marunouchi, Ōtemachi, Hibiya, Yūrakuchō, Shinbashi, Shiodome, Nihonbashi, Kyōbashi, Roppongi, Akasaka, Shibuya, Nishi-Shinjuku, Shinjuku, Shinagawa
Ulaanbaatar	Mongolia	Near Sukhbaatar Square
Visakhapatnam	India	Dwaraka Nagar, Daba Gardens, Asilmetta, Siripuram
Yerevan	Armenia	Kentron District
Yokohama	Japan	Minato Mirai 21, Naka, Area around Yokohama Station

== Europe ==
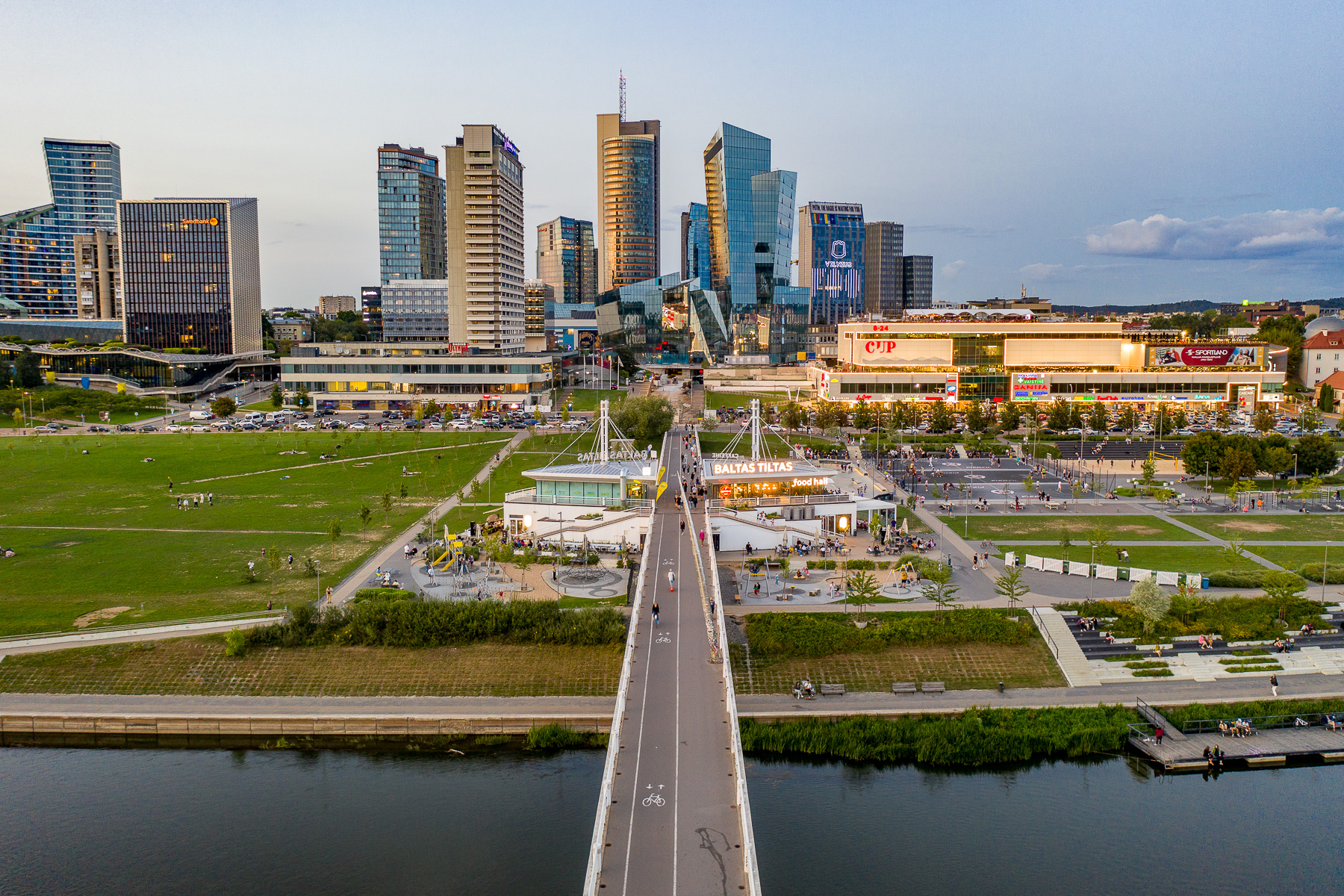
Naujasis centras, Vilnius, Lithuania

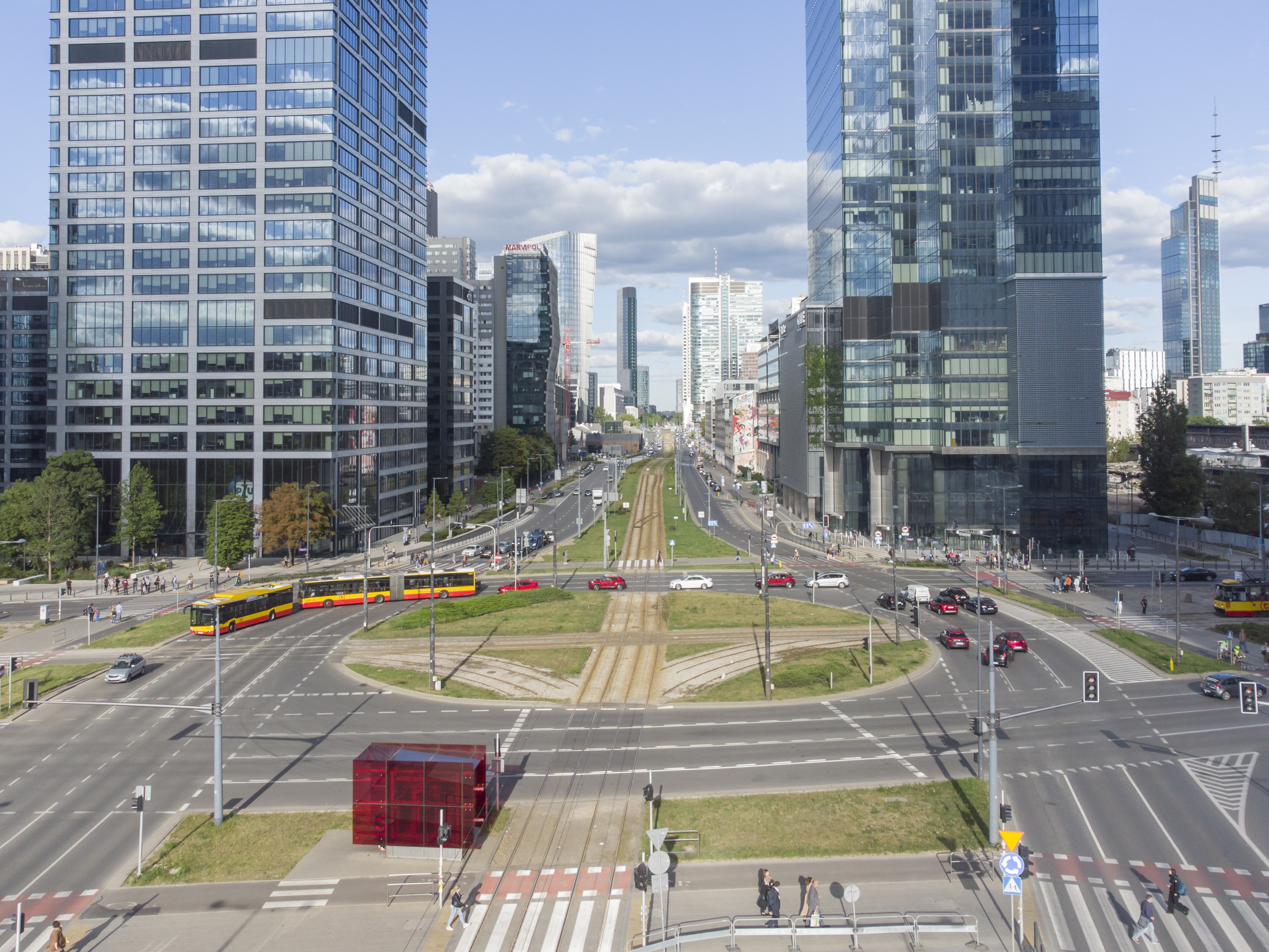
Wola, Warsaw, Poland

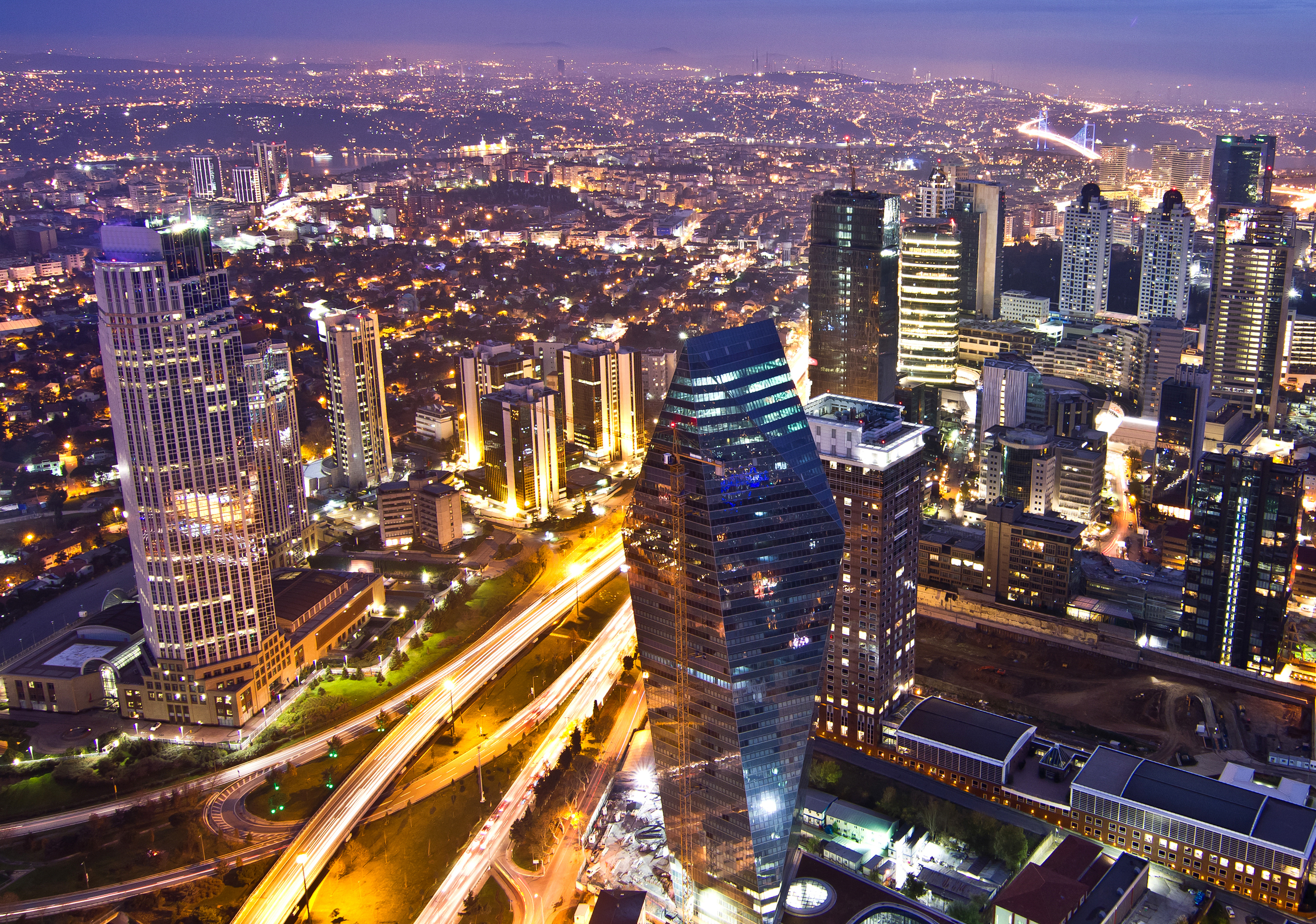
Levent, Istanbul, Turkey

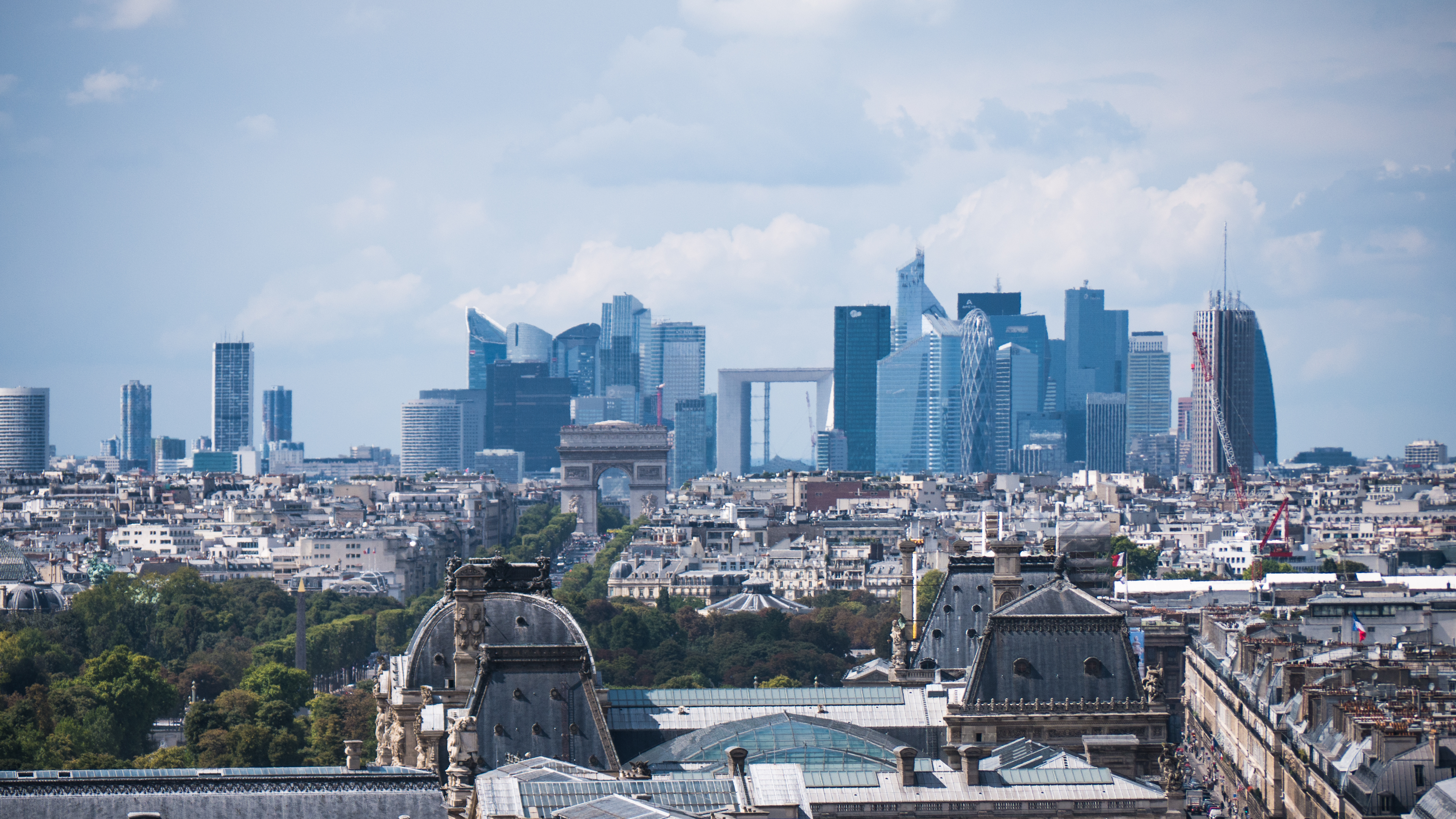
La Défense, Paris, France

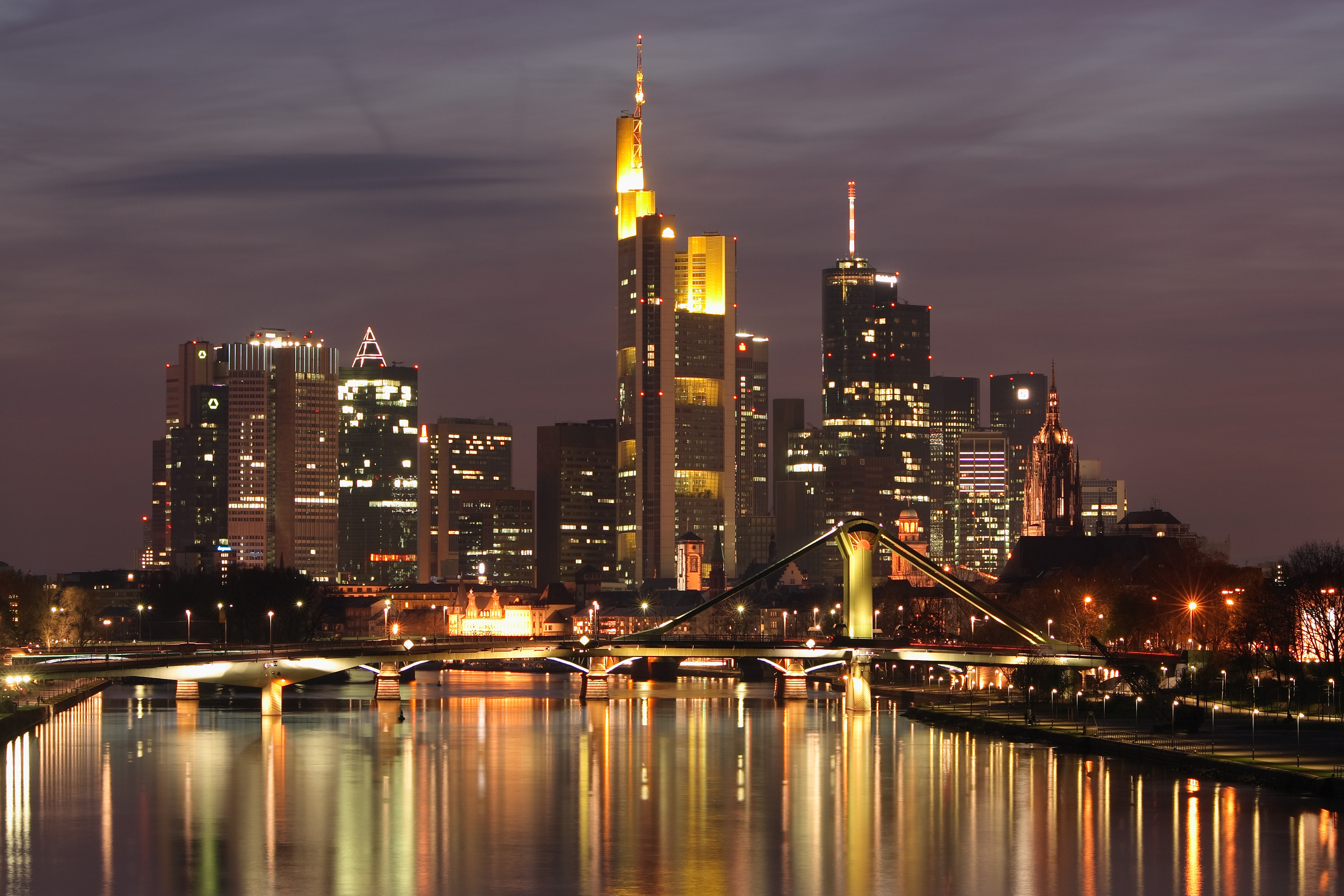
Bankenviertel, Frankfurt, Germany

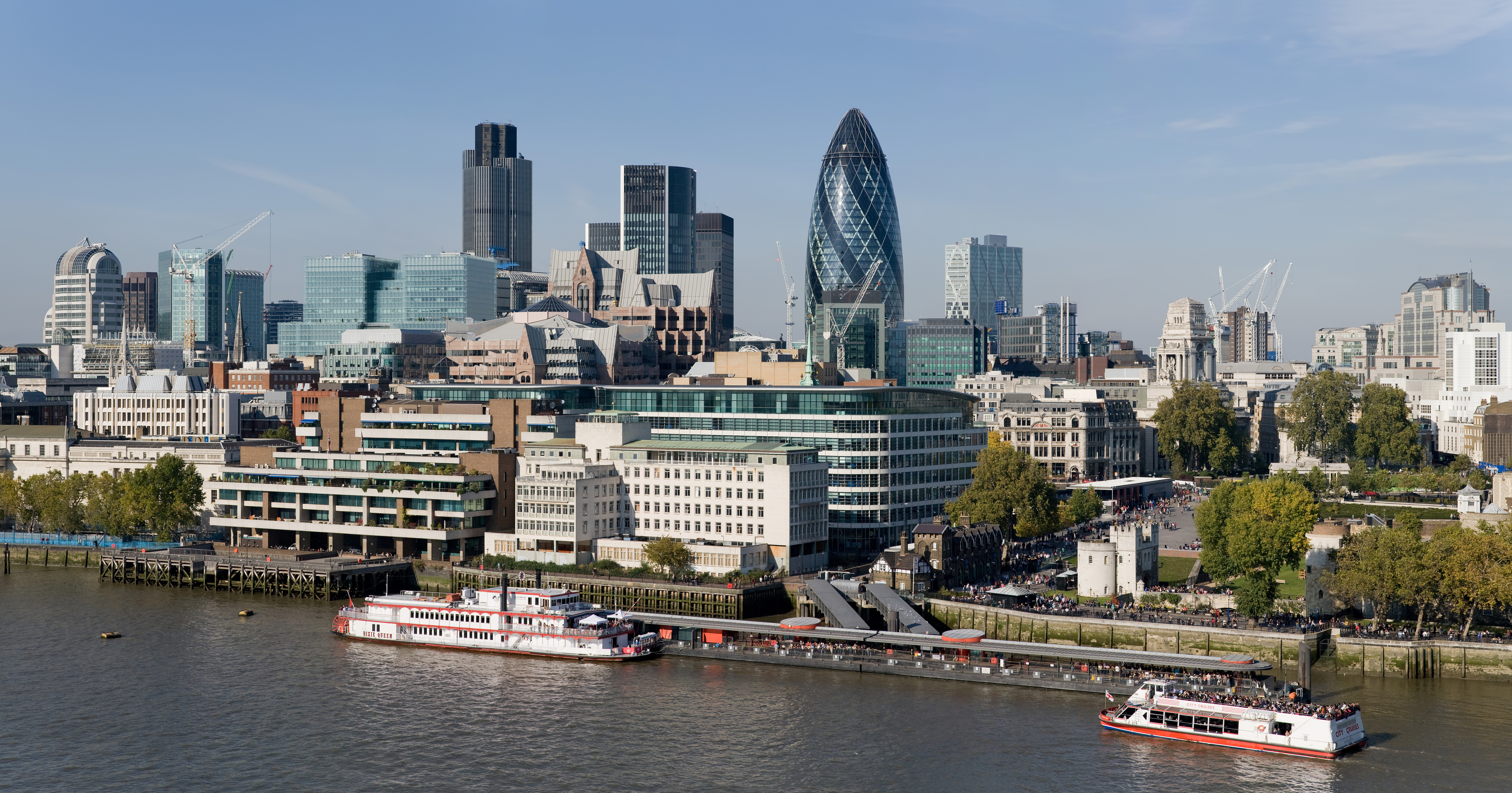
City of London, United Kingdom

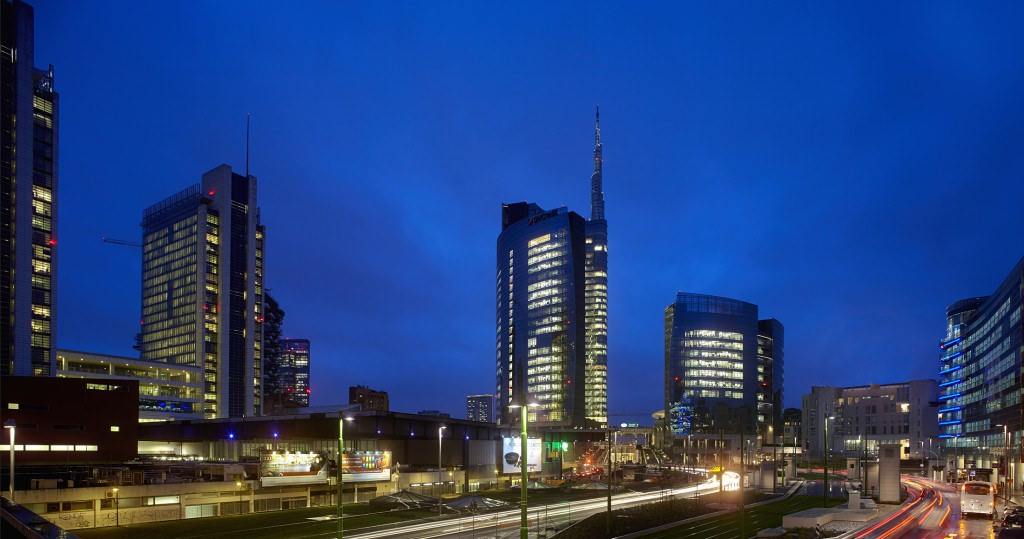
Porta Nuova, Milan, Italy

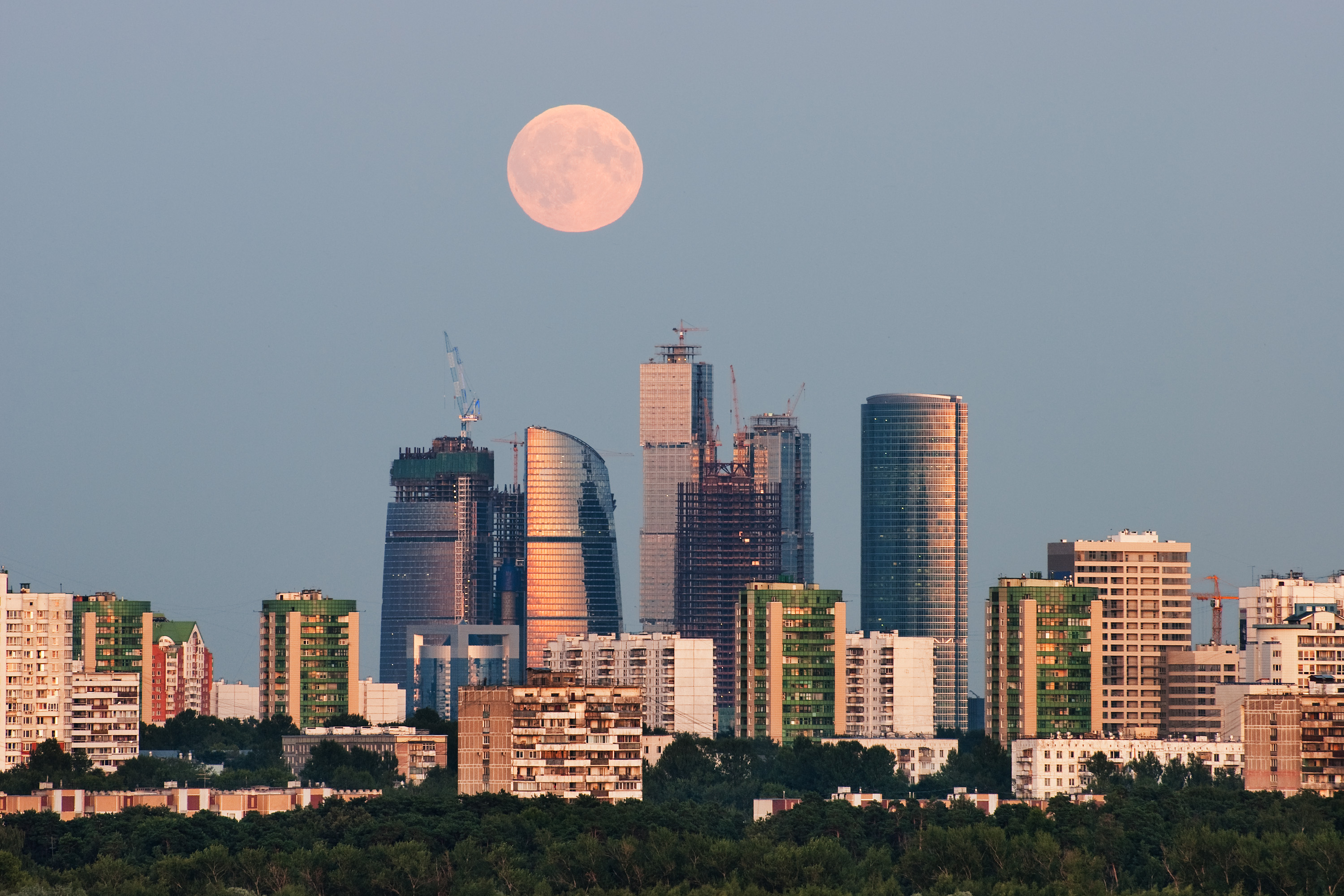
Moscow-City, Russia

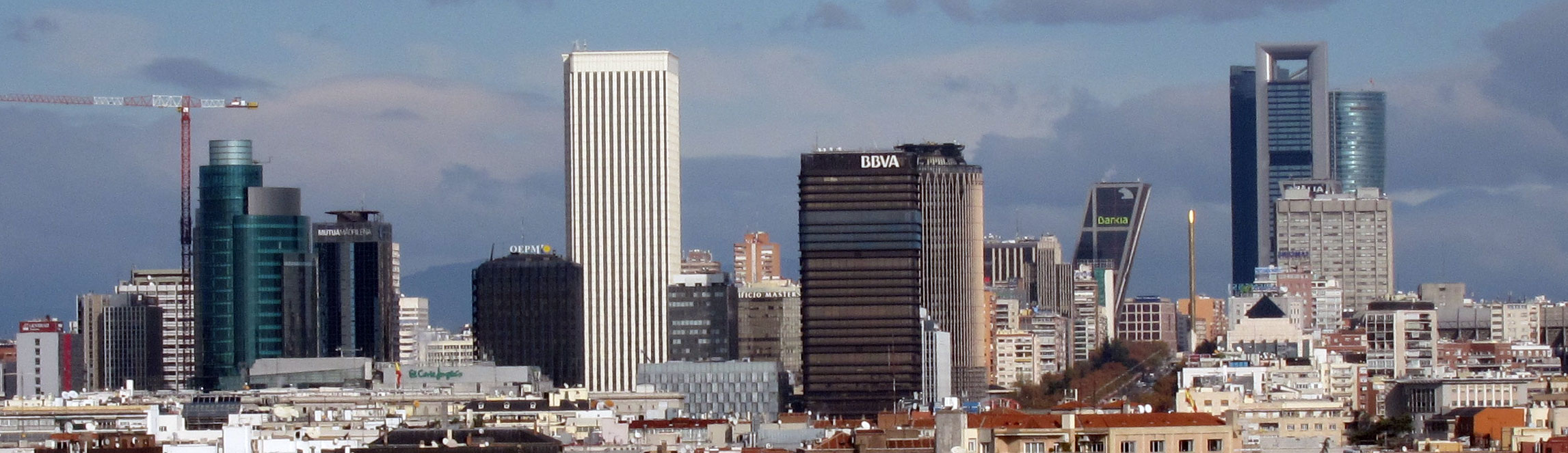
AZCA and CTBA, Madrid, Spain

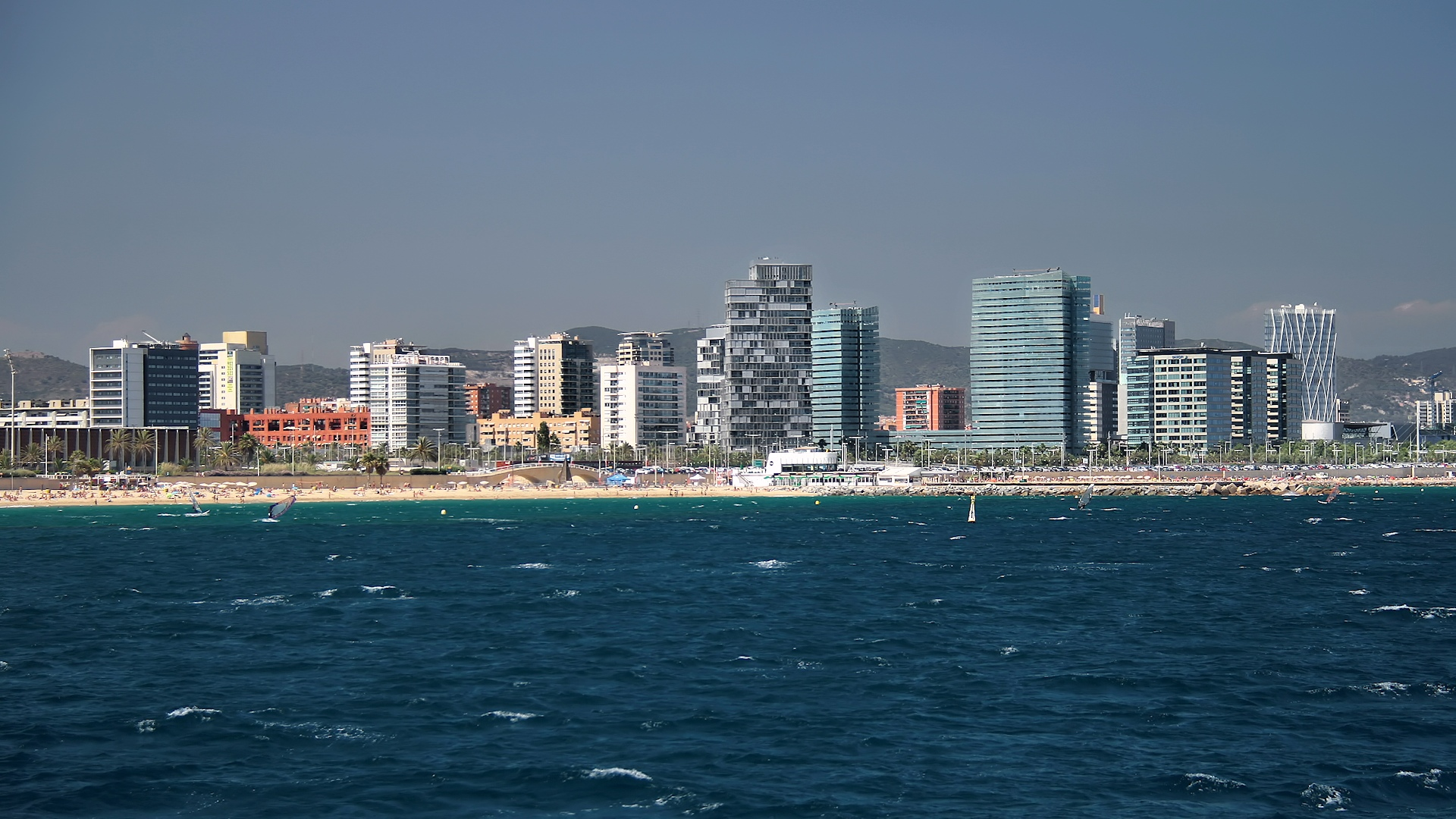
22@, Barcelona, Spain

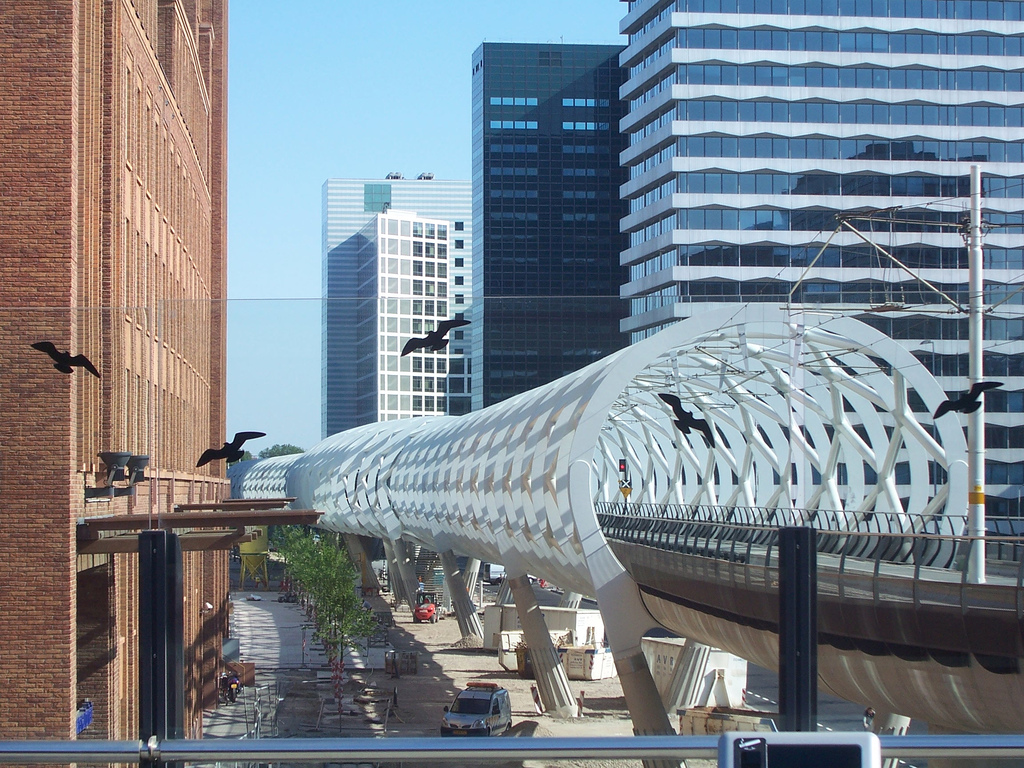
Beatrixkwartier, The Hague, the Netherlands

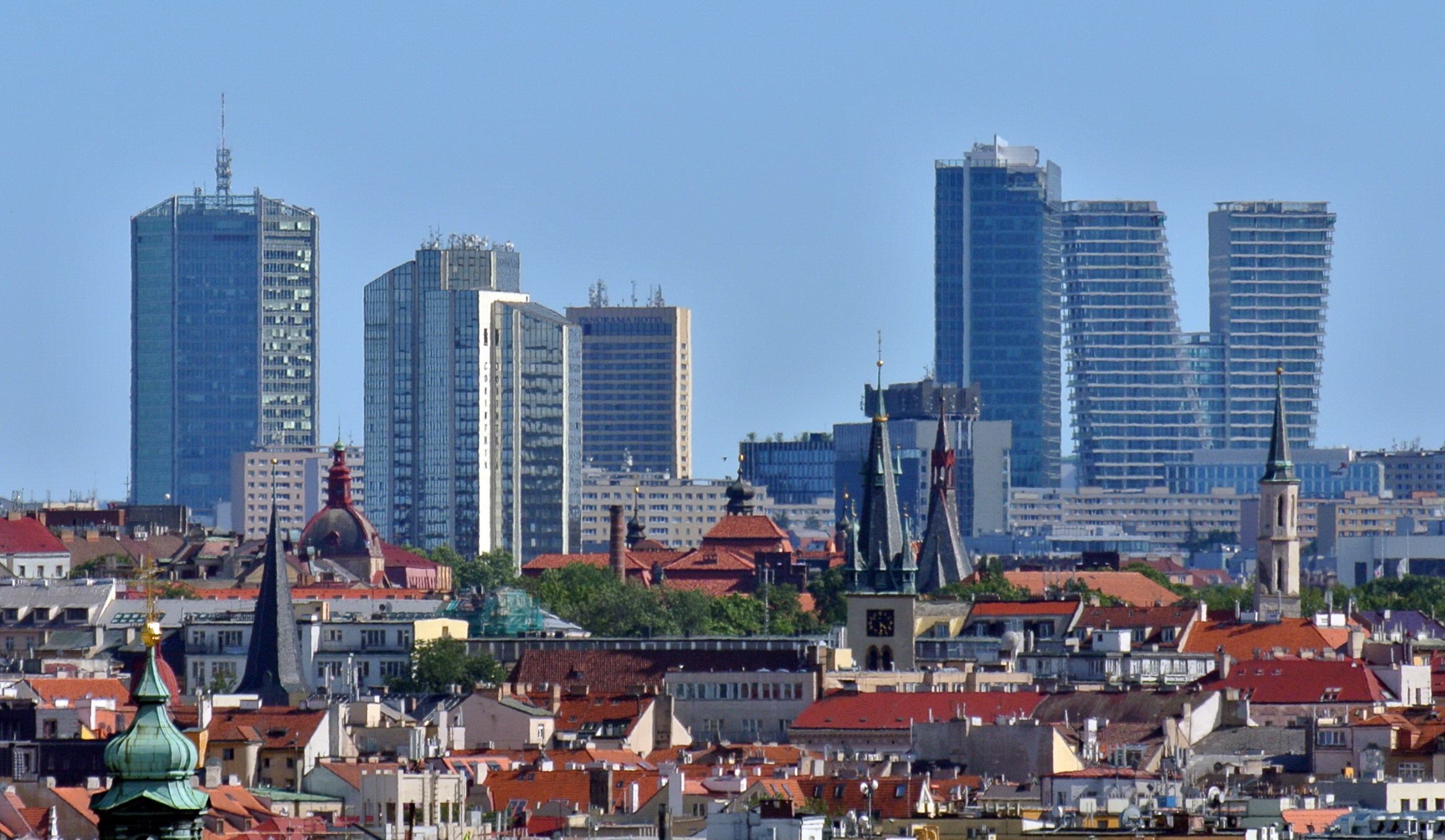
Pankrác Plain, Prague, Czech Republic

City	Country	Business district
Aarhus	Denmark	Aarhus C
Amsterdam	The Netherlands	Amsterdam-Centrum, Omval, Teleport, Zuidas
Athens	Greece	Andrea Syngrou Avenue, Athinon Avenue, Glyfada, Greek National Road 1, Hellenikon Metropolitan Park (Under Construction), Kifissias Avenue, Marousi, Omonoia, Piraeus, Sofokleous Street, Syntagma
Barcelona	Spain	Diagonal Mar, Gran Via, 22@
Belfast	United Kingdom	City Centre
Belgrade	Serbia	Krunski Venac, Novi Beograd
Berlin	Germany	Charlottenburg-Wilmersdorf (Kurfürstendamm, Area around Bahnhof Zoo), Mitte (Alexanderplatz, Potsdamer Platz)
Bern	Switzerland	Old City
Birmingham	United Kingdom	City Centre, Colmore Row, Westside and Bull Ring
Bologna	Italy	Fiera District
Bournemouth	United Kingdom	Town Centre
Bratislava	Slovakia	Bratislava Ružinov - Nivy
Brescia	Italy	Brescia Due
Bristol	United Kingdom	Bristol city centre
Brussels	Belgium	Quartier Léopold, Quartier Nord, Zaventem
Bucharest	Romania	Piaţa Victoriei and Floreasca Business Centre/Pipera Business Centre
Budapest	Hungary	Leopoldtown-Inner City, Angel's Field
Cardiff	United Kingdom	City Centre
Cologne	Germany	Innenstadt
Copenhagen	Denmark	Indre By
Cork	Ireland	City Centre
Dortmund	Germany	Downtown
Dresden	Germany	Old town
Dublin	Ireland	2/4 Districts and IFSC
Düsseldorf	Germany	Stadtmitte
Edinburgh	United Kingdom	Edinburgh Park, George Street
Essen	Germany	Südviertel
Frankfurt	Germany	Bankenviertel
Geneva	Switzerland	Cité-centre
Genoa	Italy	San Benigno
Ghent	Belgium	Sint-Denijs Western
Glasgow	United Kingdom	City Centre
The Hague	The Netherlands	Beatrixkwartier
Hamburg	Germany	Mitte
Helsinki	Finland	Helsinki City Centre
Iași	Romania	Civic Centre and Palas
Katowice	Poland	Śródmieście, Katowice
Kyiv	Ukraine	Lypky, Pechersk
Lille	France	Euralille
Lisbon	Portugal	Av da Liberdade and Parque das Nações
Liverpool	United Kingdom	City Centre
London	United Kingdom	City of London, London Docklands and West End
Lugano	Switzerland	Lugano Centro
Lyon	France	Part-Dieu
Luxembourg City	Luxembourg	Kirchberg
Madrid	Spain	AZCA, CTBA, Gran Vía
Malmö	Sweden	Centrum
Manchester	United Kingdom	Spinningfields and City Centre
Marseille	France	Euroméditerranée
Milan	Italy	Porta Nuova District, CityLife, Zona 1, Zona 2
Milton Keynes	United Kingdom	Central Milton Keynes
Moscow	Russia	Moscow International Business Center, Presnya
Monaco	Monaco	Monaco
Munich	Germany	Altstadt-Lehel, Ludwigsvorstadt-Isarvorstadt, Maxvorstadt
Nancy	France	Downtown Nancy
Nantes	France	Euronantes
Naples	Italy	Centro Direzionale
Nicosia	Cyprus	City Centre
Oslo	Norway	Sentrum, Barcode Project
Paris	France	La Défense, Val de Seine, Front de Seine
Podgorica	Montenegro	Roman Square
Prague	Czech Republic	Pankrác Plain
Reykjavík	Iceland	Borgartún (financial district), Miðborg (administrative and commercial district)
Rome	Italy	EUR, Monti, Castro Pretorio
Rotterdam	The Netherlands	Rotterdam Centrum/Kop van Zuid
Saint Petersburg	Russia	Lakhta Center
Seville	Spain	Sevilla Tower
Sofia	Bulgaria	Business Park Sofia
Stockholm	Sweden	Stockholm City Centre
Strasbourg	France	Wacken (Strasbourg)
Stuttgart	Germany	Stuttgart-Mitte, Stuttgart-Vaihingen (STEP) and Am Wallgraben) and Stuttgart-Fasanenhof (EnBW-City)
Tallinn	Estonia	Maakri
Thessaloniki	Greece	City Centre
Tórshavn	Faroe Islands	Tinganes
Trondheim	Norway	Midtbyen
Turku	Finland	Turku City Centre
Vantaa	Finland	Aviapolis
Vienna	Austria	Innere Stadt and Donau City
Vilnius	Lithuania	Vilnius Central Business District
Warsaw	Poland	Śródmieście, Warsaw, Wola
Yekaterinburg	Russia	Yekaterinburg-City
Zagreb	Croatia	Kanal, Zagreb, Trnje
Zürich	Switzerland	Altstadt, Zürich-West

== North America ==
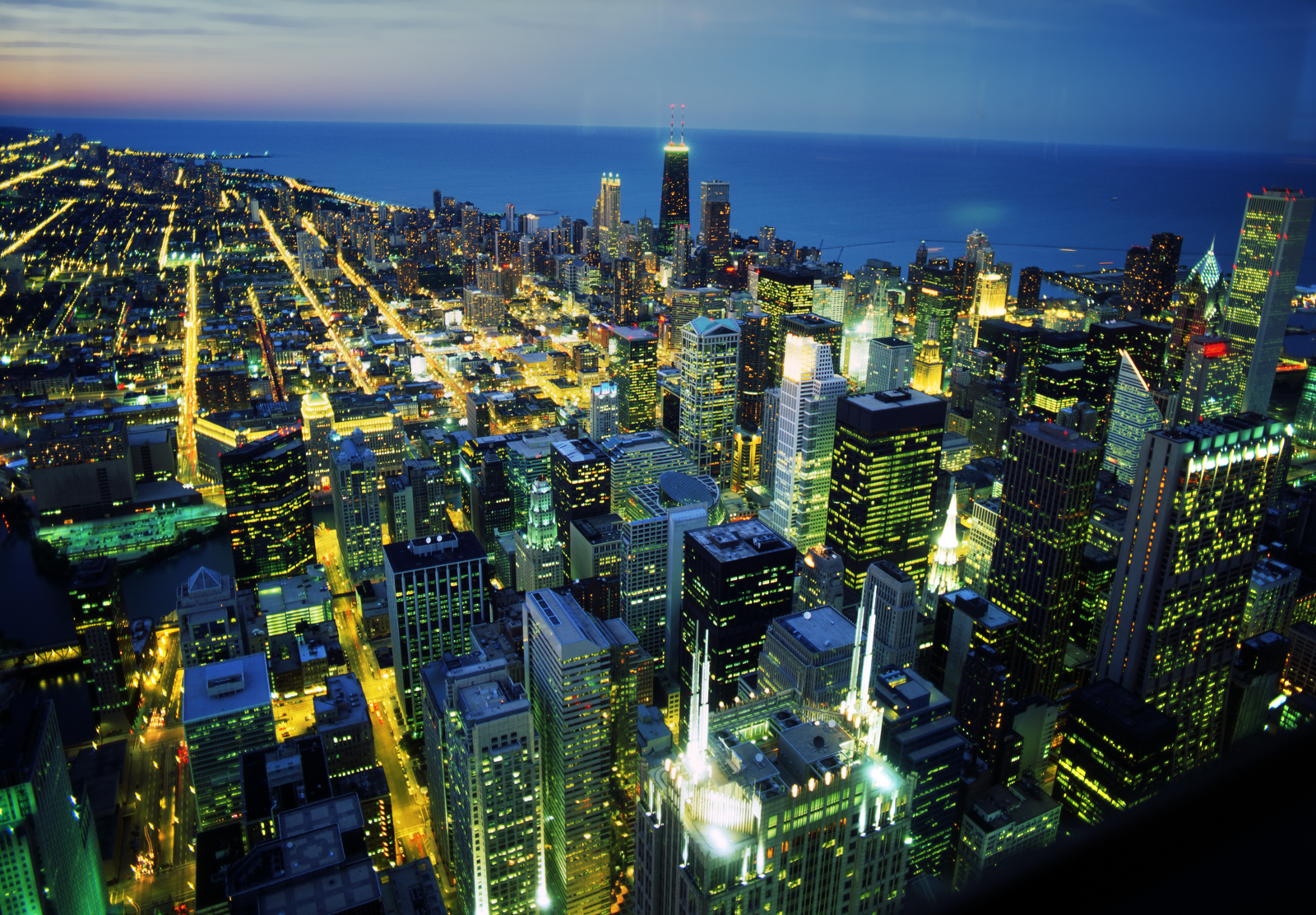
Loop, Chicago

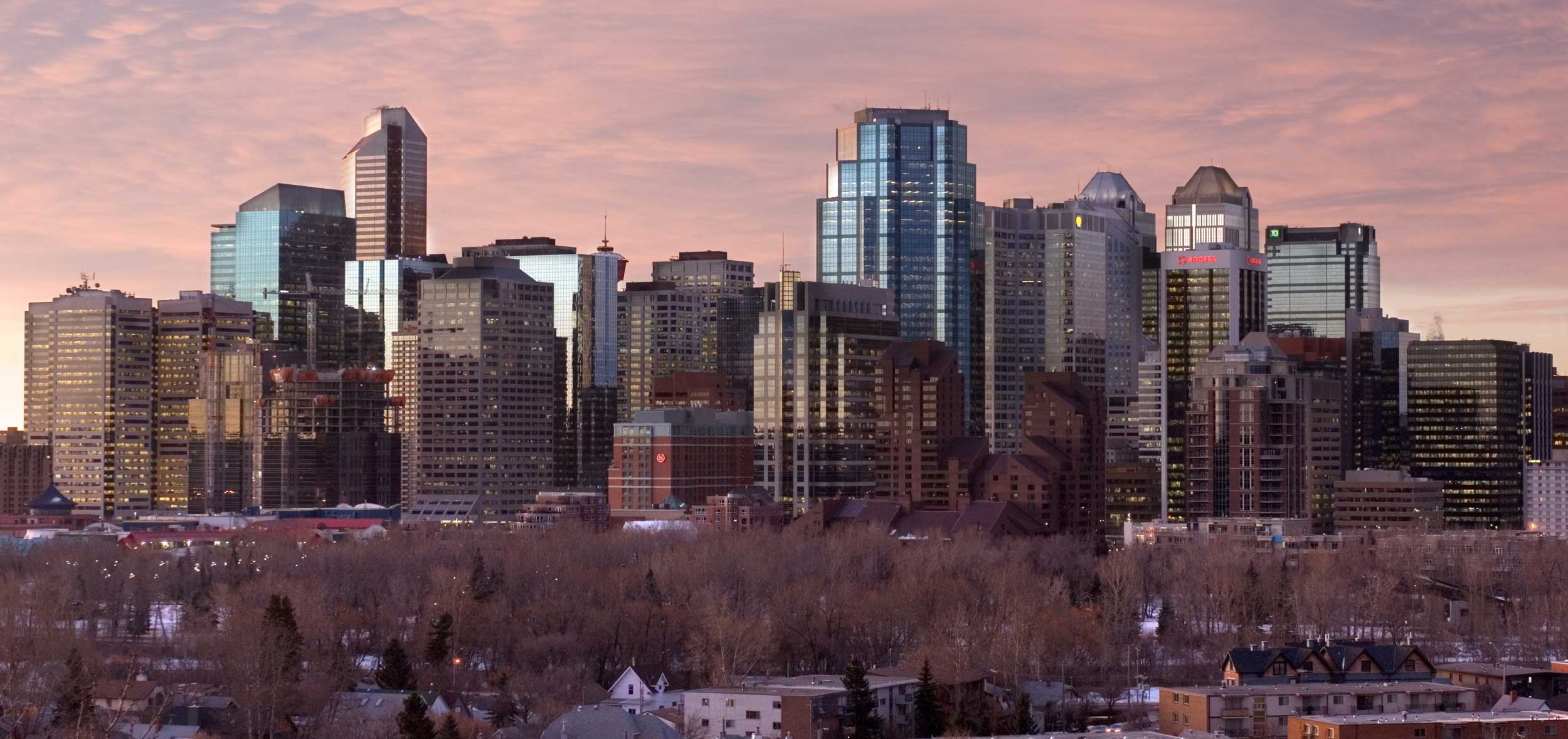
Downtown, Calgary

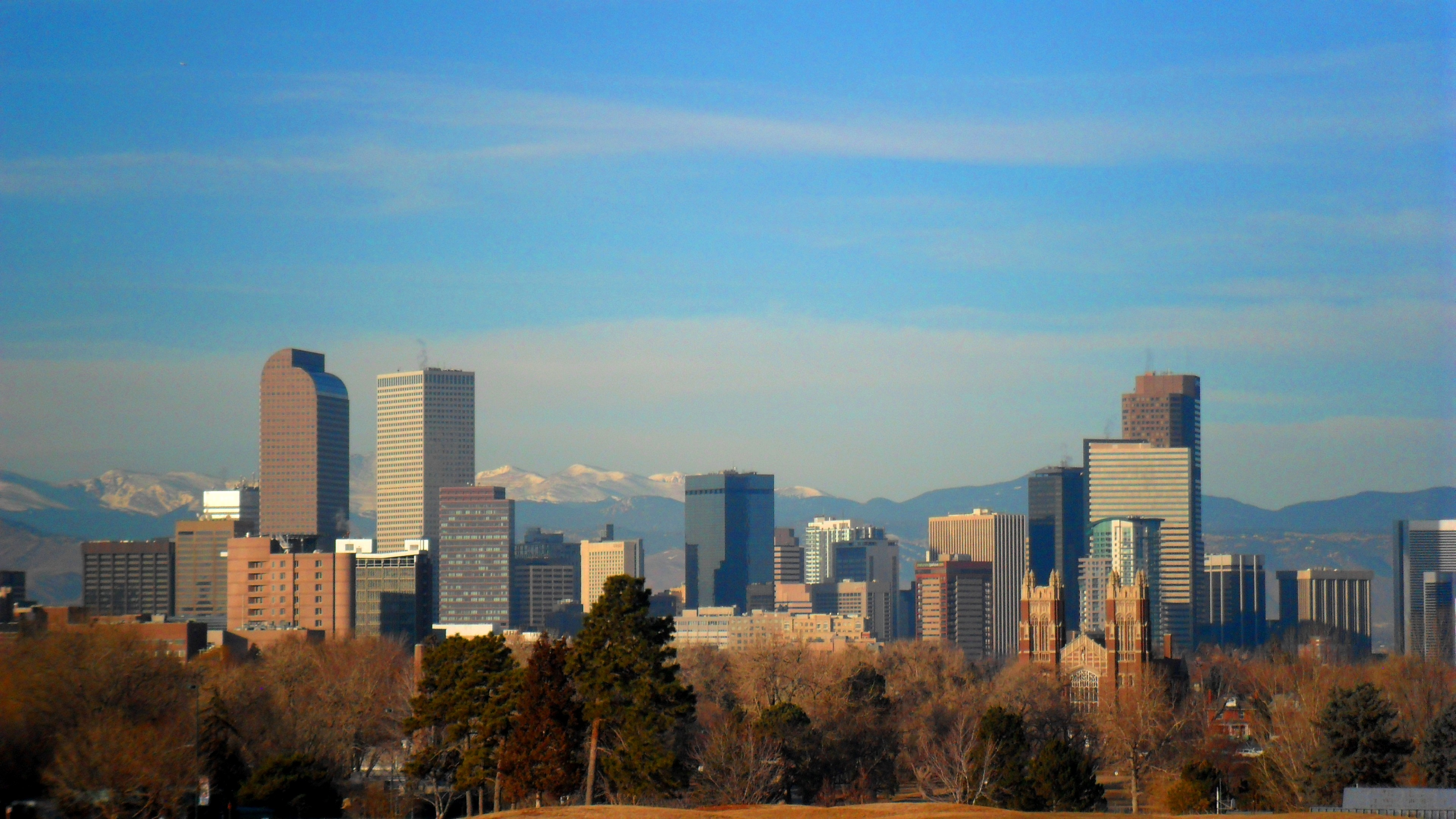
Downtown, Denver

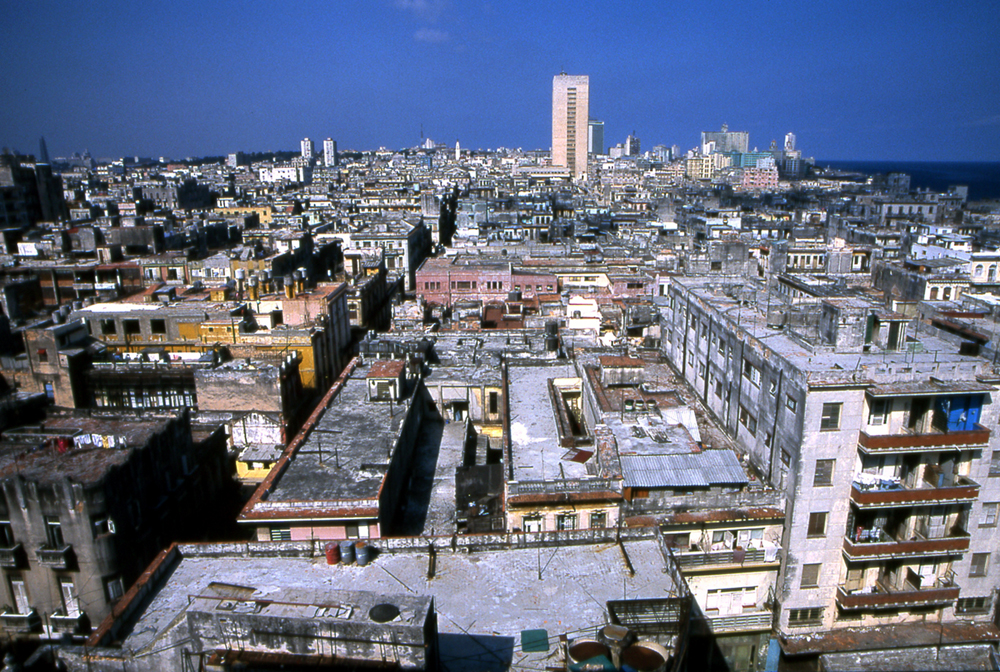
Vedado, Havana

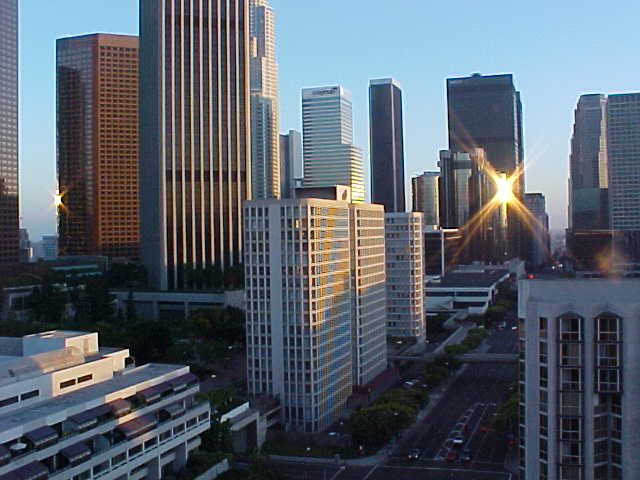
Downtown, Los Angeles

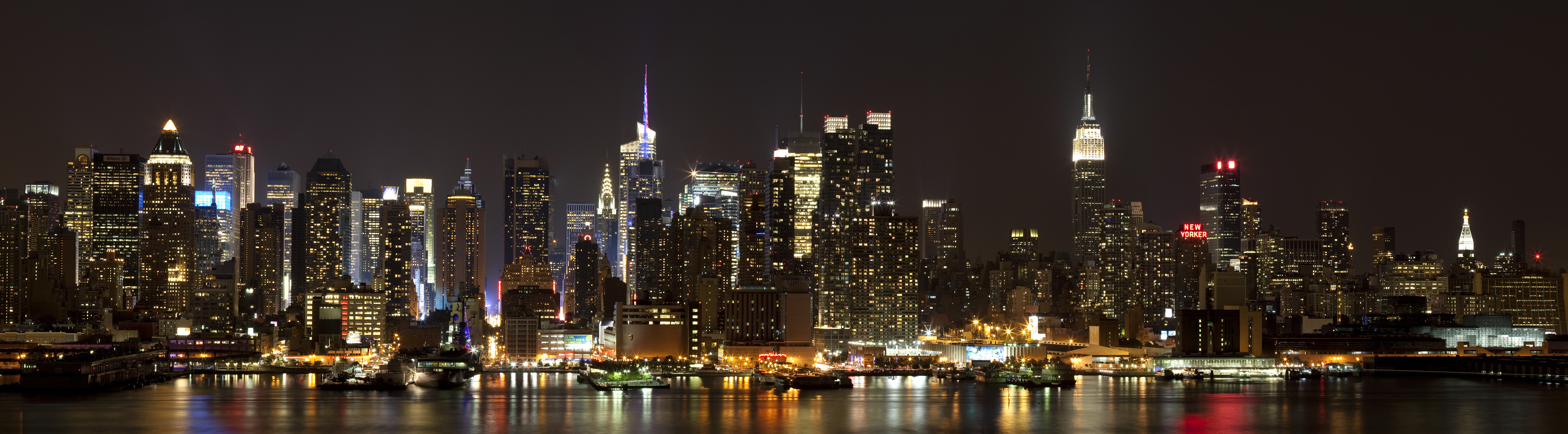
Midtown Manhattan, New York City

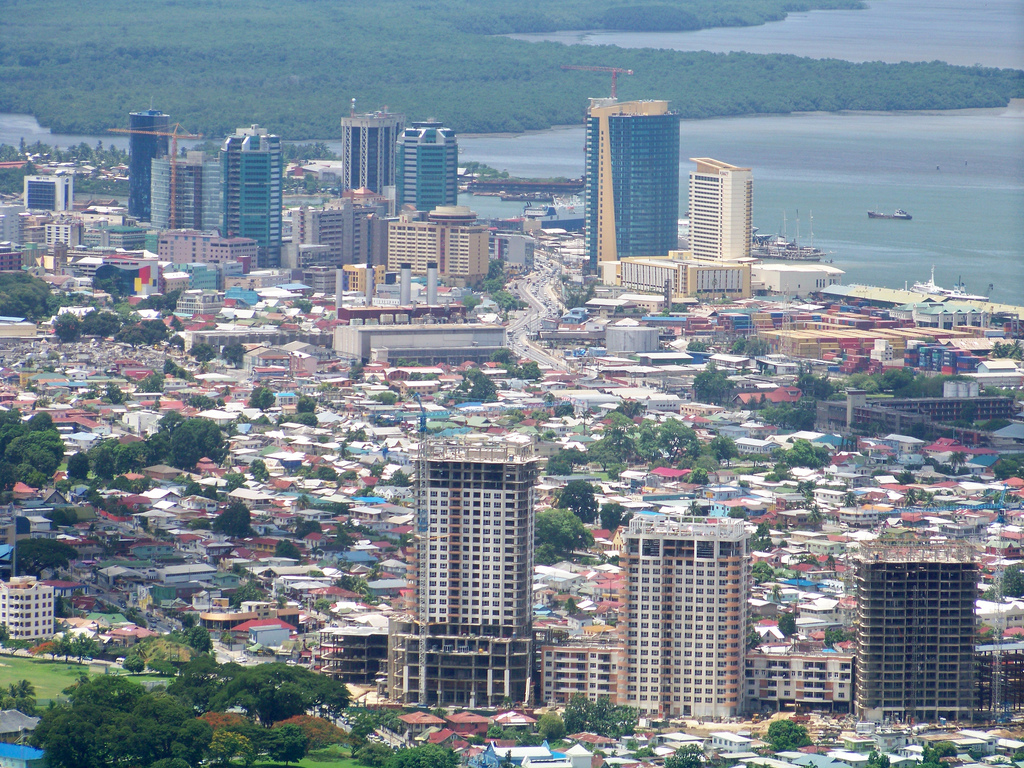
Town, Port of Spain

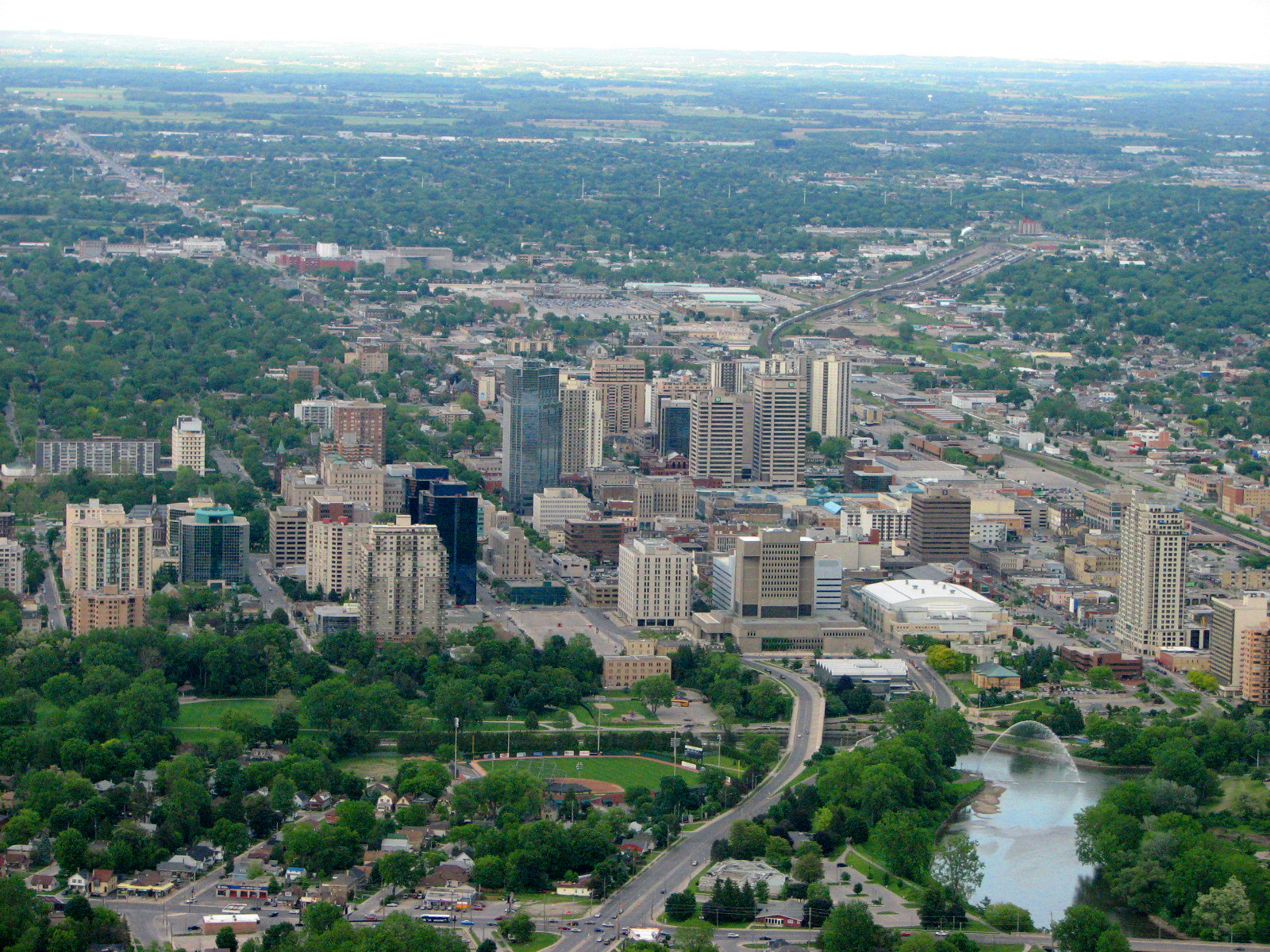
Downtown London, Ontario

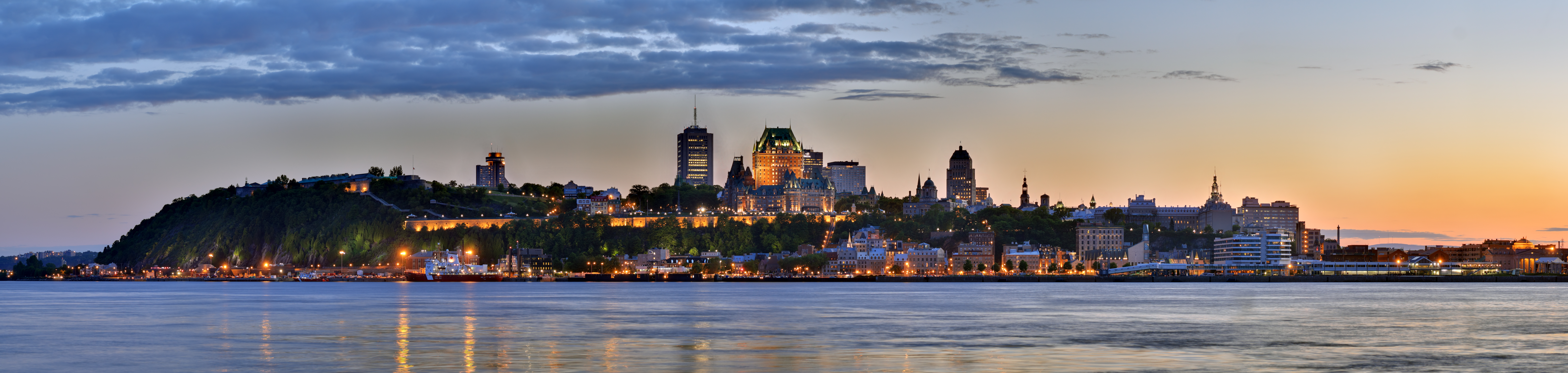
La Cite, Quebec City

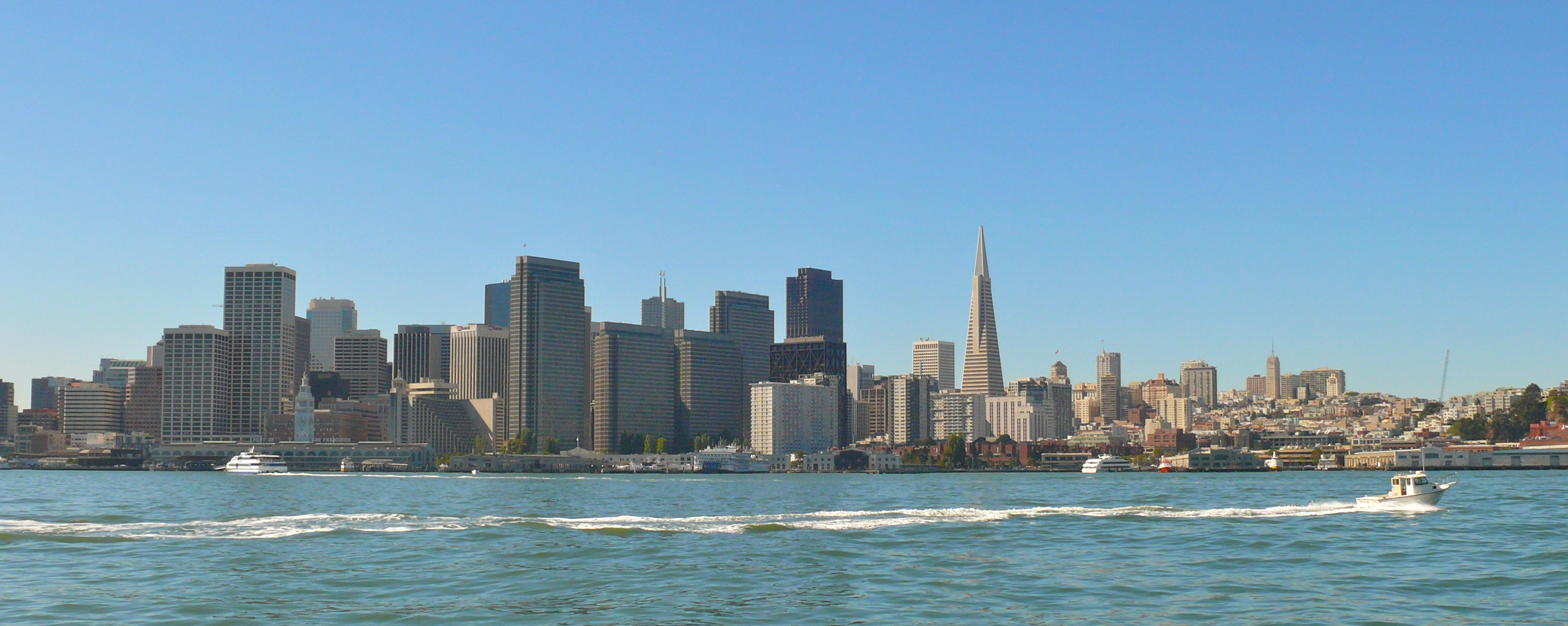
Downtown, San Francisco

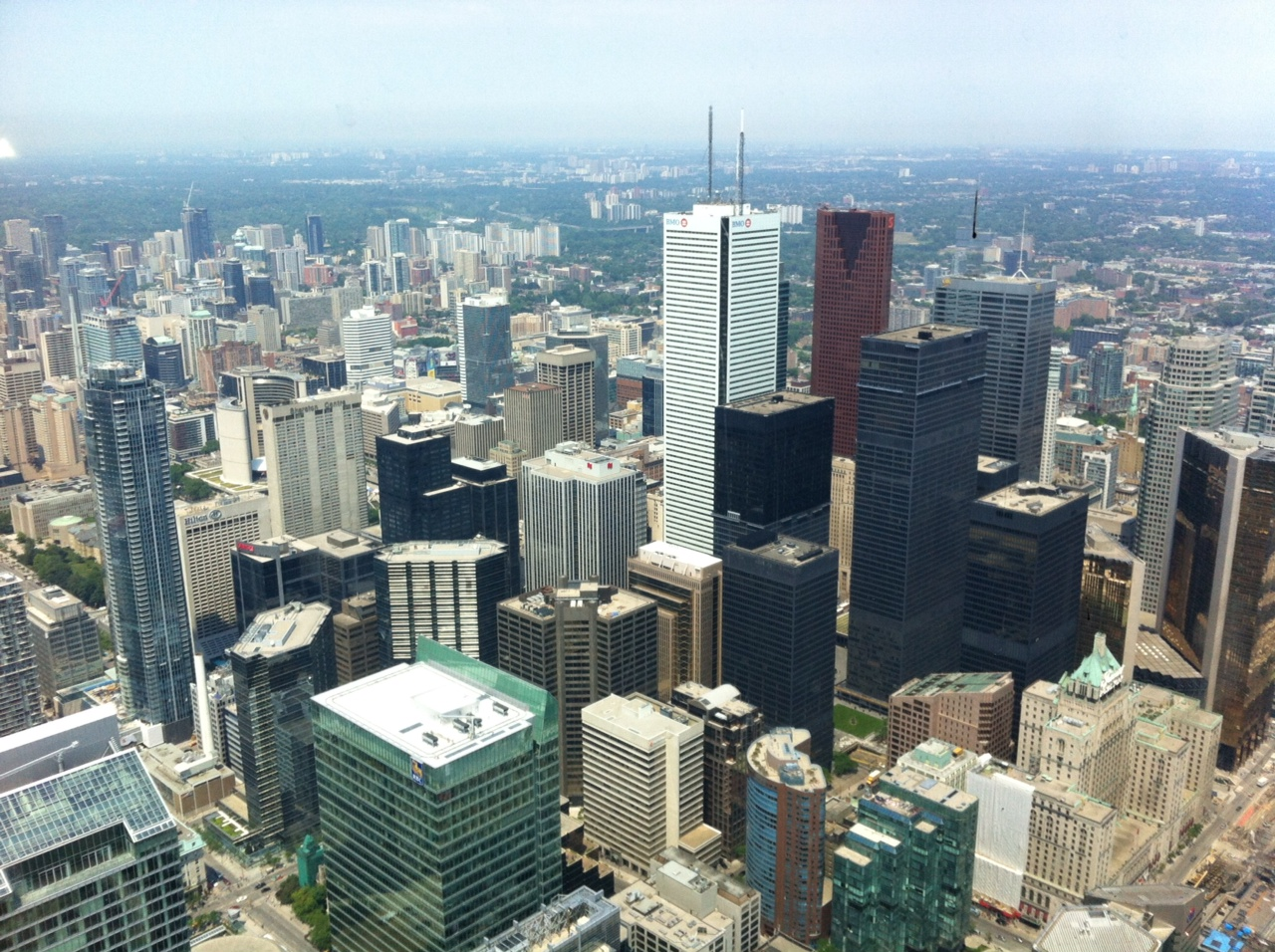
Financial District, Toronto

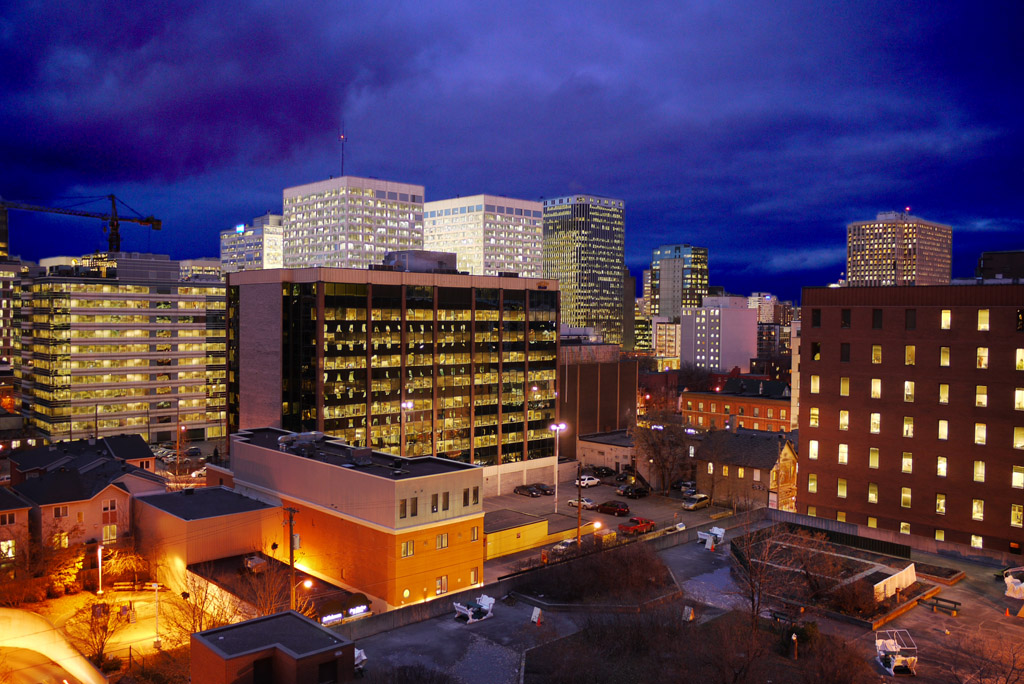
Downtown Ottawa

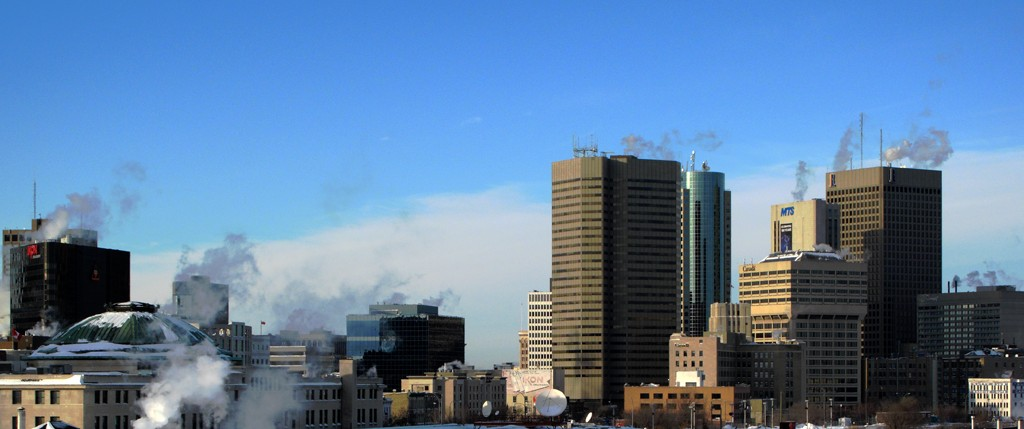
Downtown, Winnipeg

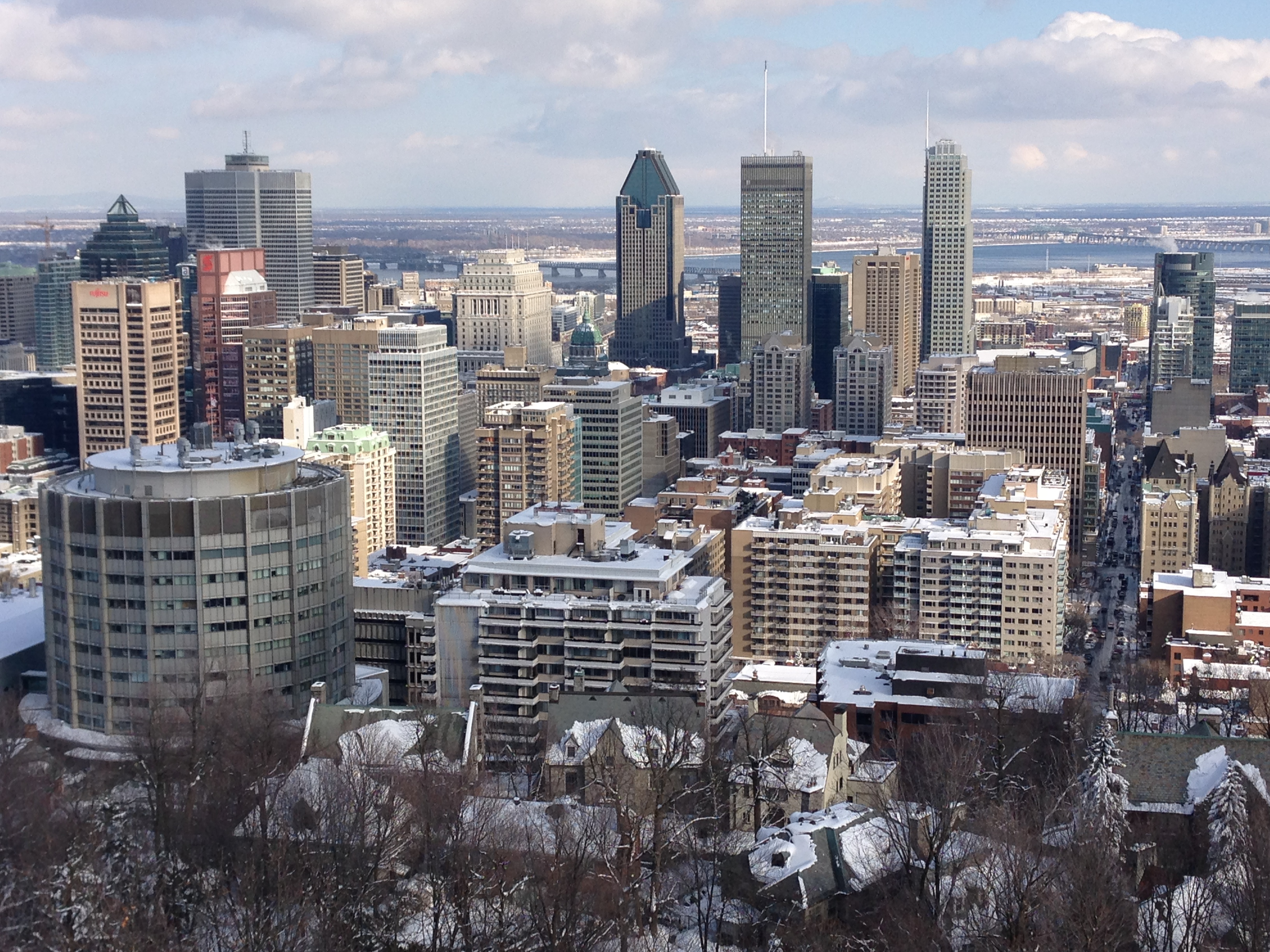
Downtown, Montreal

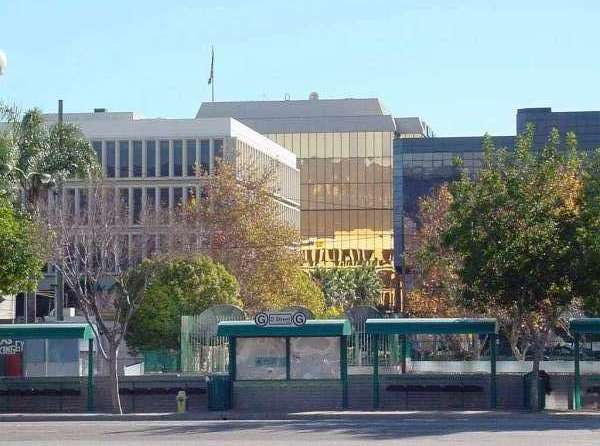
Downtown, San Bernardino

City	Country	Business district
Albany	United States	Downtown Albany Historic District
Albuquerque	United States	Downtown Albuquerque
Allentown	United States	Center City
Anchorage	United States	Downtown Anchorage
Athens	United States	Downtown Athens
Atlanta	United States	Downtown, Midtown, Buckhead, Sandy Springs
Arlington	United States	Rosslyn
Augusta	United States	Augusta Downtown Historic District
Austin	United States	Downtown Austin
Bakersfield	United States	Downtown Bakersfield
Baltimore	United States	Downtown, Hamilton, Inner Harbor, Harbor East, Towson
Beaumont	United States	Downtown Beaumont
Bentonville	United States	Downtown Bentonville
Berkeley	United States	Downtown Berkeley
Binghamton	United States	Downtown Binghamton
Boise	United States	Downtown Boise
Boston	United States	Downtown, Back Bay, Cambridge
Burnaby	Canada	Metrotown, Brentwood, Edmonds
Calgary	Canada	Downtown, Macleod Trail
Camden	United States	Camden Central Business District
Charlotte	United States	Uptown, Southpark
Cheyenne	United States	Downtown Cheyenne Historic District
Chicago	United States	Chicago Loop, Near North Side, Near West Side, Golden Corridor, Illinois Technology and Research Corridor
Cincinnati	United States	Downtown
Cleveland	United States	Downtown, University Circle
Columbia	United States	Downtown Columbia
Columbus	United States	Downtown
Columbus, Georgia	United States	Downtown
Compton	United States	Downtown
Culiacán	Mexico	Downtown
Dallas	United States	Downtown, Platinum Corridor, Stemmons Corridor
Dayton	United States	Downtown Dayton
Denver	United States	Downtown, Tech Center
Des Moines	United States	Downtown
Detroit	United States	Financial District, Southfield
Duluth	United States	Downtown
Edmonton	Canada	Downtown
El Paso	United States	Downtown
Erie	United States	Downtown
Evansville	United States	Downtown
Fort Worth	United States	Downtown
Gary	United States	Downtown
Grand Forks	United States	Downtown
Guadalajara	Mexico	Puerta de Hierro, Chapultepec Av, de las Americas Av
Gatineau	Canada	Hull Sector
Guatemala City	Guatemala	Zone 1
Guelph	Canada	Downtown
Harrisburg	United States	Downtown
Halifax	Canada	Downtown, Downtown Dartmouth
Hamilton, Ontario	Canada	King and James
Hartford	United States	Downtown
Havana	Cuba	Vedado
Hayward	United States	Downtown
Honolulu	United States	Downtown
Houston	United States	Downtown, Uptown, Texas Medical Center, Greenway Plaza, Energy Corridor, Greenspoint, Westchase
Indianapolis	United States	Downtown
Ithaca	United States	Ithaca Commons
Jacksonville	United States	Downtown, LaVilla, Brooklyn, Southbank
Jersey City	United States	Downtown, Journal Square
Juneau	United States	Juneau Downtown Historic District
Kansas City	United States	Downtown
Kingston	Canada	Sydenham Ward
Knoxville	United States	Downtown
Lansing	United States	Downtown
Laredo	United States	Downtown
Las Vegas	United States	Downtown Las Vegas, Fremont Street
Lethbridge	Canada	Downtown
Long Beach	United States	Downtown
Los Angeles	United States	Downtown, Financial District, Century City, Wilshire (Wilshire Center/Koreatown, Miracle Mile), Hollywood, Westwood, West Los Angeles, Warner Center
Louisville	United States	Downtown
Macon	United States	Downtown
Memphis	United States	Downtown
Mexico City	Mexico	Paseo de la Reforma, City Santa Fe, Polanco, Interlomas, CBD Perisur
Miami	United States	Downtown, Brickell
Milwaukee	United States	Downtown
Minneapolis	United States	Downtown West, Minneapolis, Downtown East, Minneapolis
Mississauga	Canada	Mississauga City Centre
Missoula	United States	Downtown
Modesto	United States	Downtown
Monterrey	Mexico	Downtown Monterrey, San Pedro Garza García, Valle Oriente
Montreal	Canada	Downtown, Quartier international de Montréal
New Haven	United States	Downtown
New Orleans	United States	CBD
New York City	United States	Midtown Manhattan, Lower Manhattan, Downtown Brooklyn, Flushing, Long Island City
Newark	United States	Downtown
Norfolk	United States	Downtown
Oakland	United States	Downtown, Jack London Square
Oklahoma City	United States	Downtown
Omaha	United States	Downtown Omaha
Orlando	United States	Downtown Orlando
Ottawa	Canada	Downtown
Pasadena	United States	Downtown
Paterson	United States	Downtown
Philadelphia	United States	Center City, University City
Phoenix	United States	Downtown, Midtown
Pittsburgh	United States	Downtown, Oakland
Plano	United States	Legacy West
Port of Spain	Trinidad and Tobago	Town
Portland	United States	Downtown, Lloyd District
Prince Albert	Canada	Central Business District or Downtown
Providence	United States	Downtown
Puebla	Mexico	Angelopolis
Quebec City	Canada	Saint-Roch, Sainte-Foy, Lévis
Regina	Canada	Downtown
Richmond	Canada	Area around City Centre
Richmond	United States	Downtown
Roanoke	United States	Downtown
Rochester	United States	Downtown
Sacramento	United States	Downtown
Saint Paul	United States	Downtown
Salt Lake City	United States	Downtown Salt Lake City (City Creek Center), Central City
San Antonio	United States	Downtown
San Bernardino	United States	Downtown, Hospitality Lane
San Diego	United States	Downtown, La Jolla, University City, Rancho Bernardo, Carmel Valley, Mission Valley, Sorrento Mesa, Del Mar Heights
San Francisco	United States	Financial District
San Jose	United States	Downtown
San Juan	United States	Hato Rey
San Salvador	El Salvador	District 3
Santo Domingo	Dominican Republic	Polígono Central
Saskatoon	Canada	Central Business District
Seattle	United States	Downtown, South Lake Union
Schenectady	United States	Downtown
South Bend	United States	Downtown
Spokane	United States	Downtown
Springfield	United States	Metro Center
St. Catharines	Canada	Downtown
St. John's	Canada	Downtown
St. Louis	United States	Downtown, Central West End, Downtown Clayton
Stamford	United States	Downtown
Syracuse	United States	Downtown
Surrey	Canada	Whalley
Tacoma	United States	Downtown
Tampa	United States	Downtown, Uptown, Westshore
Thunder Bay	Canada	Downtown Fort William
Tijuana	Mexico	Zona Río
Toledo	United States	Downtown
Toronto	Canada	Downtown, Midtown, North York City Centre, Scarborough City Centre, Islington-City Centre West
Tulsa	United States	Downtown
Vancouver	Canada	Downtown
Vaughan	Canada	Vaughan Metropolitan Centre
Victoria	Canada	Downtown
Virginia Beach	United States	Town Center
Washington, D.C.	United States	Downtown, NoMa, Tysons, Rosslyn, Ballston, Pentagon City-Crystal City, Downtown Bethesda, Reston Town Center, Downtown Silver Spring
Waterbury	United States	Downtown
Whitehorse	Canada	Downtown
Wichita	United States	Downtown
Winnipeg	Canada	Downtown, Saint Boniface

== Oceania ==
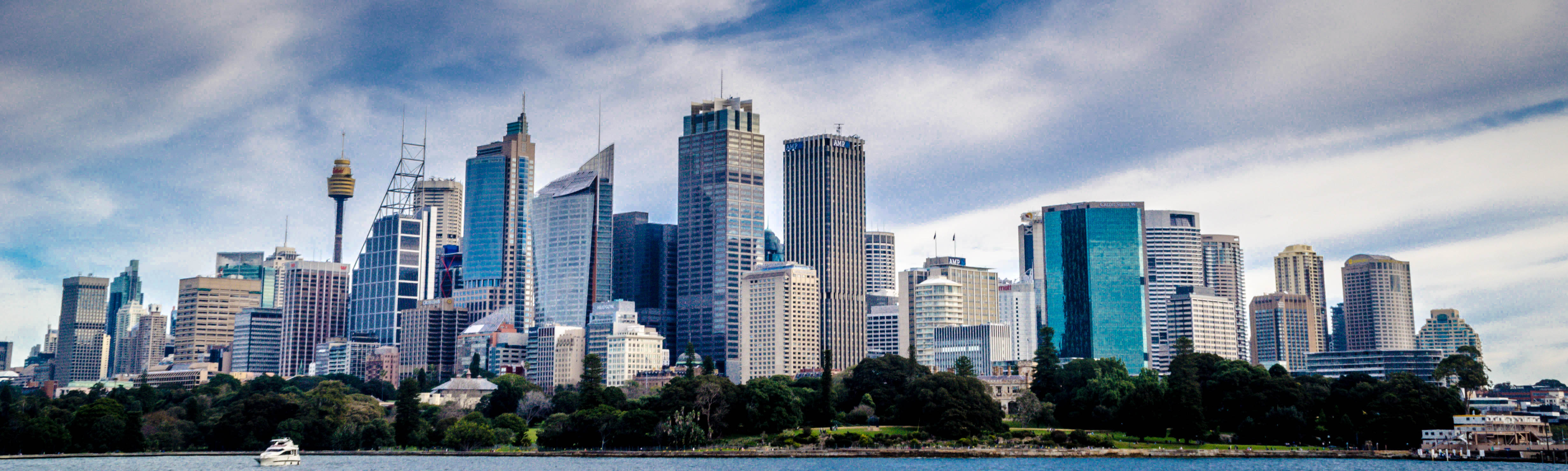
Sydney, Australia's largest CBD

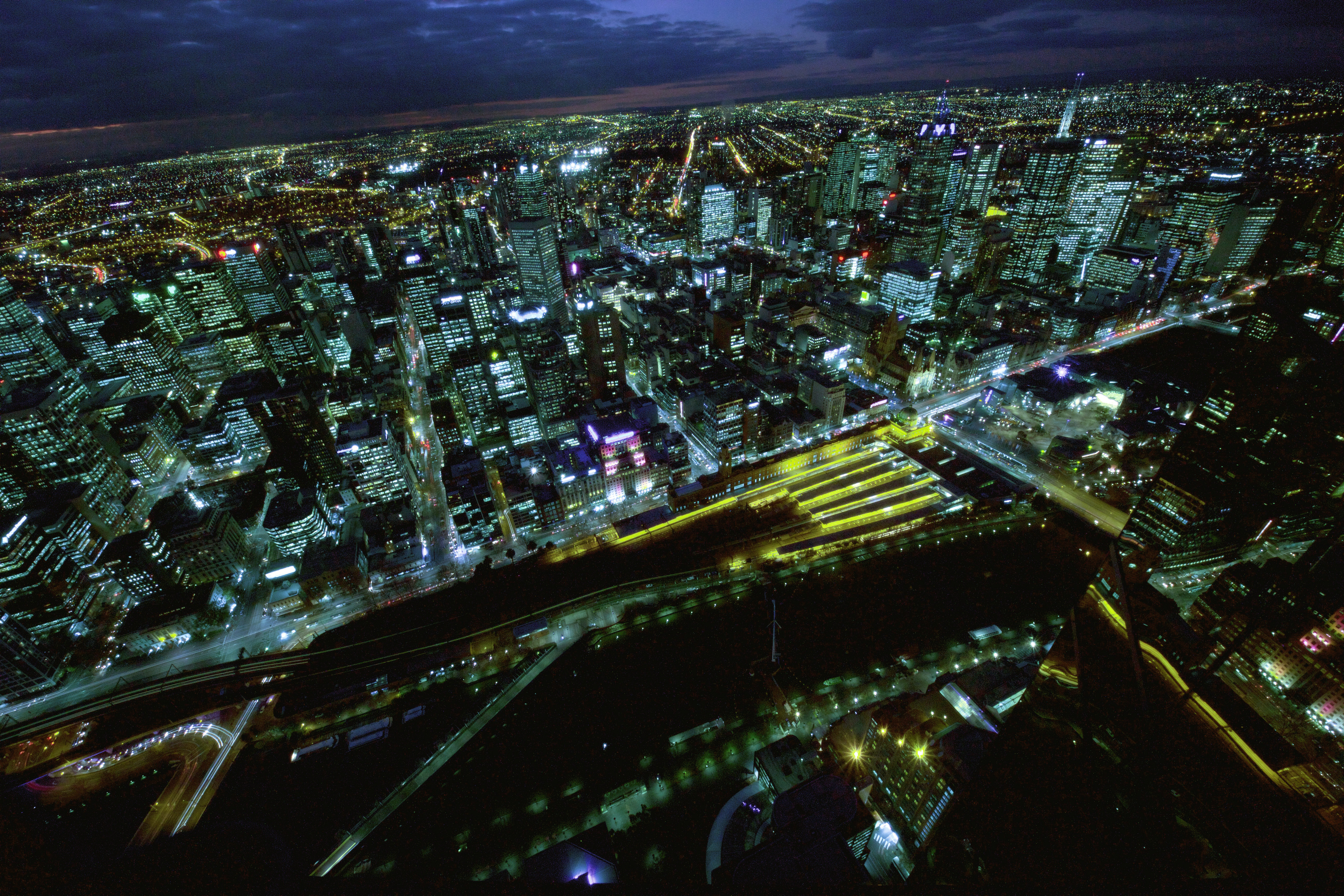
Melbourne CBD

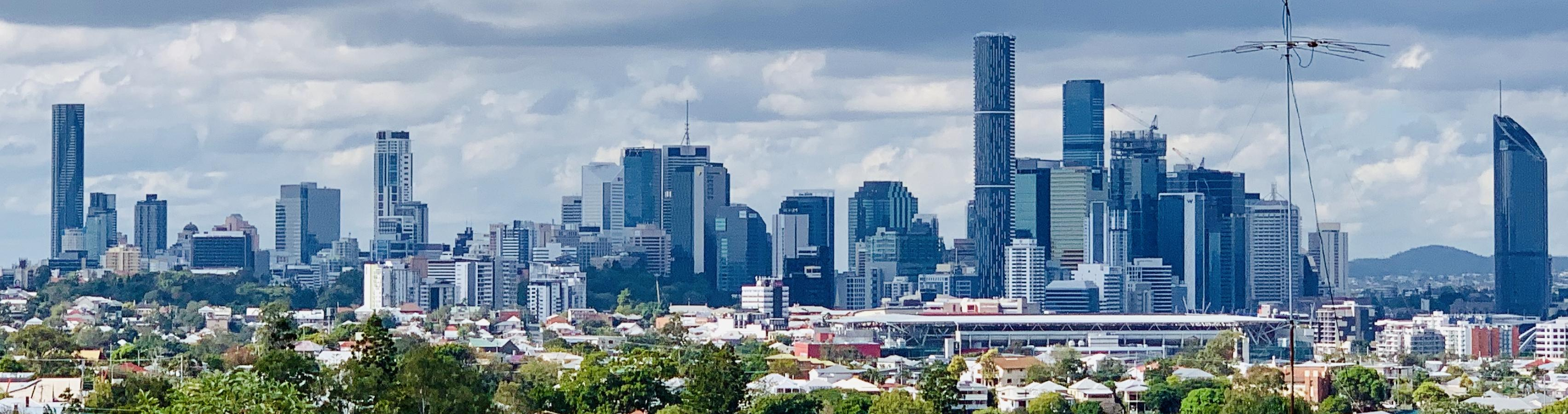
Brisbane CBD

City	Country	Business district
Adelaide	Australia	Adelaide CBD
Auckland	New Zealand	Auckland CBD
Brisbane	Australia	Brisbane CBD
Canberra	Australia	Civic
Christchurch	New Zealand	Christchurch Central City
Darwin	Australia	Darwin CBD
Gold Coast	Australia	Broadbeach, Surfers Paradise, Southport
Hobart	Australia	Hobart CBD
Melbourne	Australia	Melbourne CBD, Southbank, Melbourne Docklands, Box Hill
Newcastle	Australia	Wickham, Hamilton
Perth	Australia	Perth CBD
Suva	Fiji	Central
Sydney	Australia	Sydney CBD, Parramatta, North Sydney, Chatswood, Liverpool, Barangaroo, Pyrmont, Haymarket
Wellington	New Zealand	Wellington Central

== South America ==
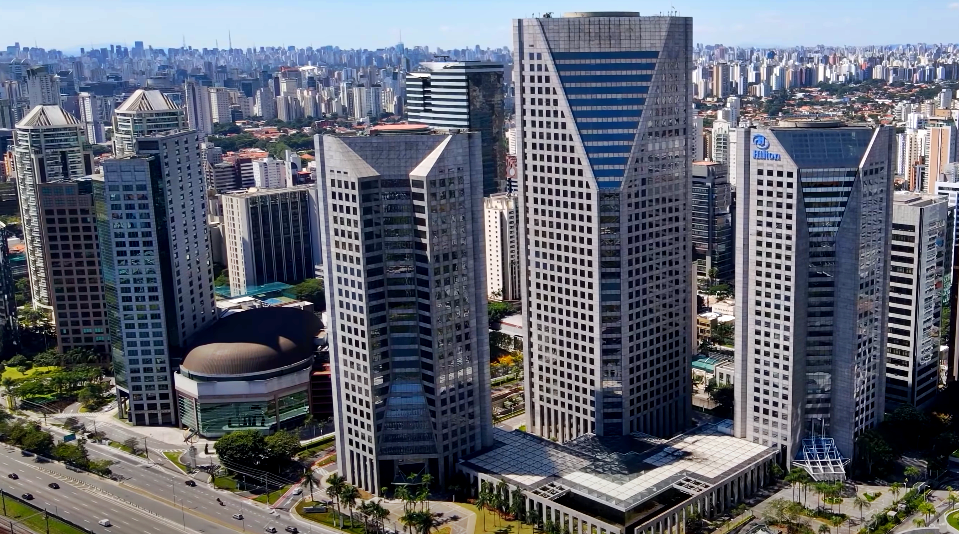
Itaim Bibi, São Paulo

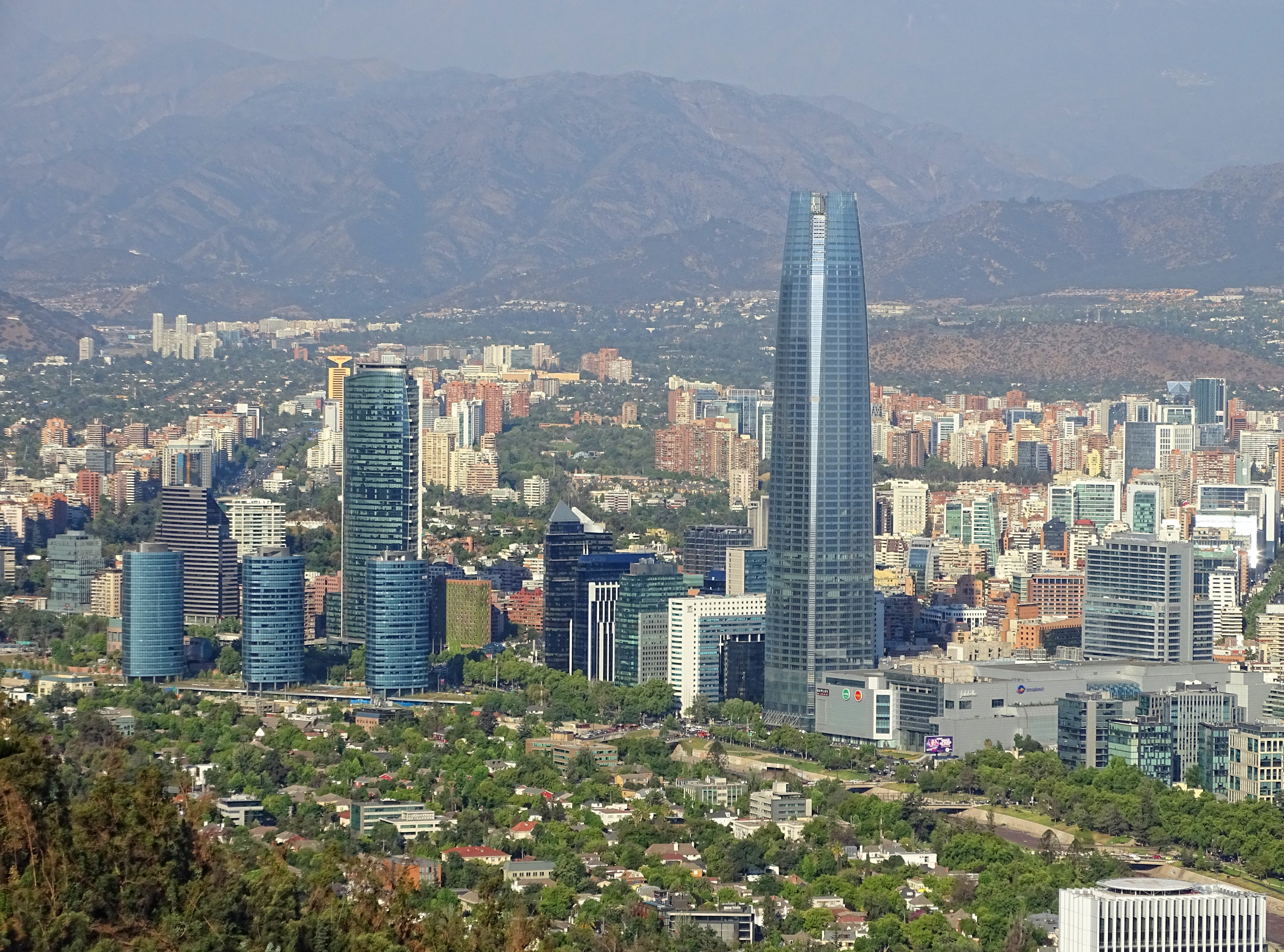
Sanhattan, Santiago

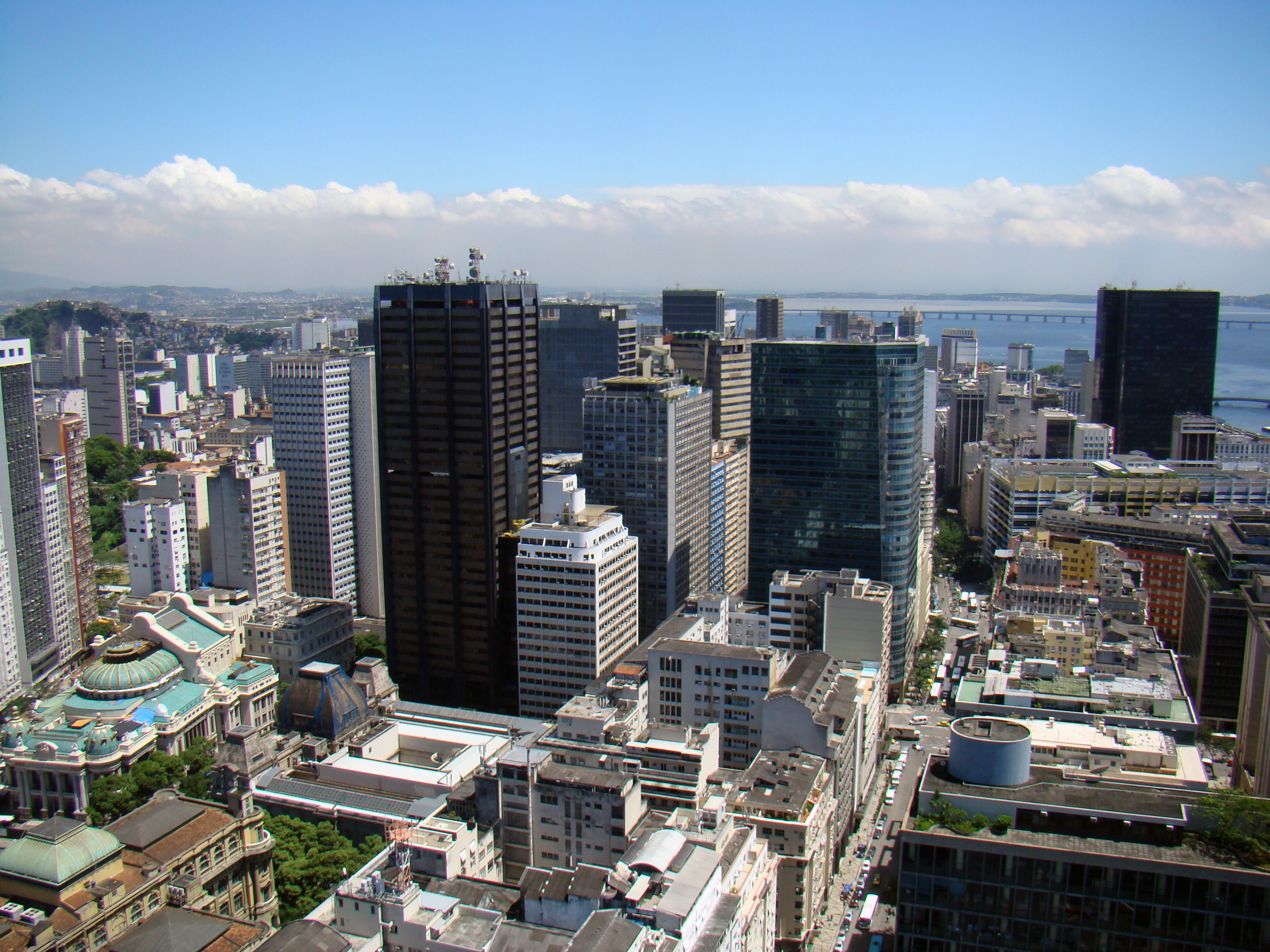
Financial Center, Rio de Janeiro

City	Country	Business district
Barranquilla	Colombia	Paseo de Bolívar
Belo Horizonte	Brazil	Avenida Afonso Pena, Praça Sete, Avenida Amazonas
Bogotá	Colombia	Centro Internacional de Bogotá, Avenida Chile, Ciudad Salitre, World Trade Center Calle 100, Complejo Empresarial Santa Bárbara
Brasília	Brazil	Eixo Monumental
Buenos Aires	Argentina	Puerto Madero, Buenos Aires Central Business District
Caracas	Venezuela	Chacao, Milla de Oro, Plaza Venezuela, Parque Central Complex, Las Mercedes, El Rosal, Altamira, El Recreo
Cartagena de Indias	Colombia	Bocagrande
Lima	Peru	San Isidro, Surco (El Derby), Downtown Lima
Medellín	Colombia	El Poblado
Montería	Colombia	Avenida Primera
Montevideo	Uruguay	Barrio Centro, Ciudad Vieja
Quito	Ecuador	Iñaquito, Av. 12 de Octubre, Av. González Suárez, Av. Patria and La Mariscal
Rio de Janeiro	Brazil	Centro Financeiro do Rio, Porto Maravilha (under construction)
São Paulo	Brazil	Paulista Avenue, Faria Lima, Brooklin, Vila Olímpia, Downtown São Paulo, Alphaville
Santiago	Chile	Sanhattan
