= Cité-centre =

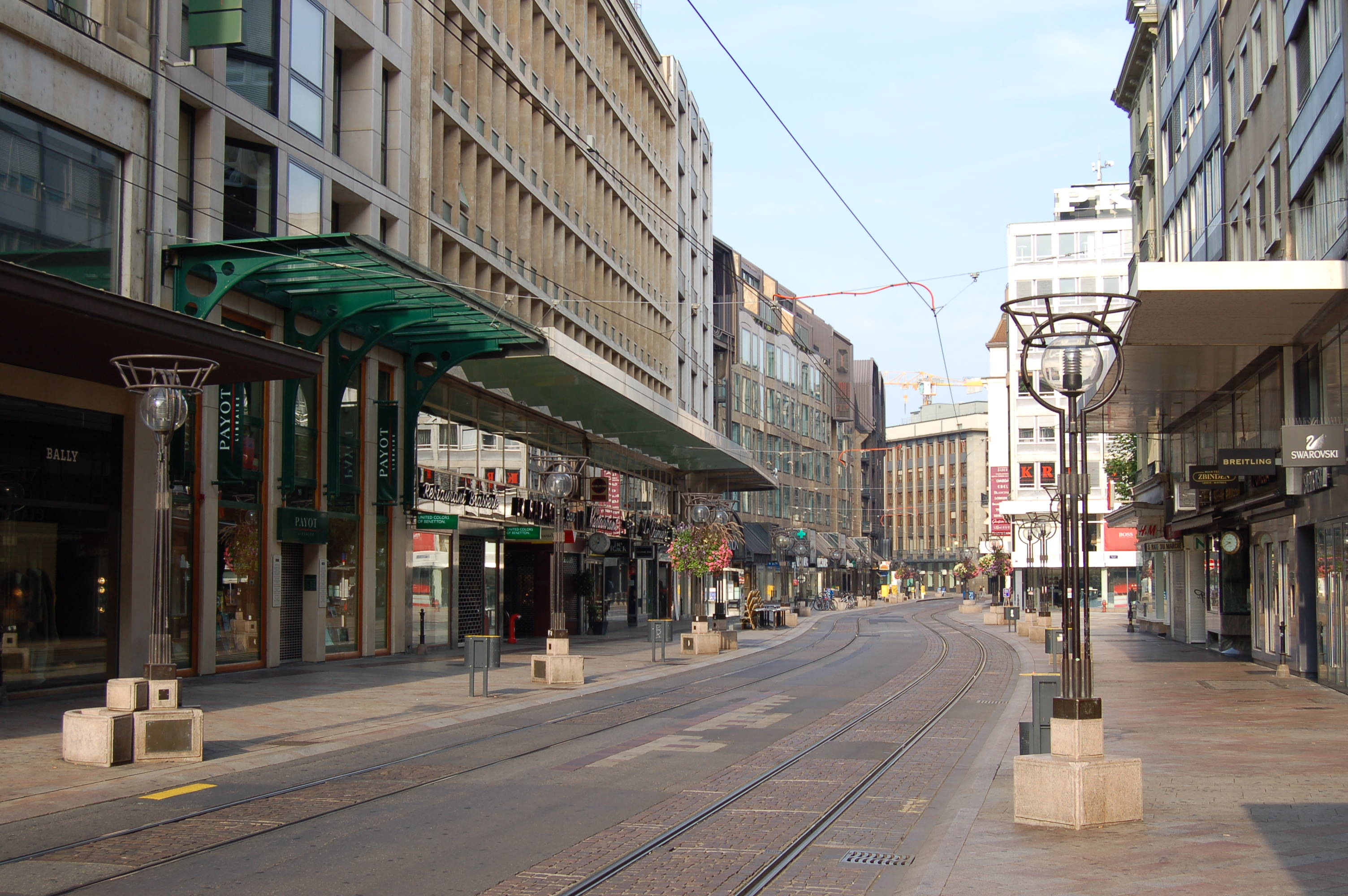
- Rue du Marché

- Location within Switzerland Location within Canton of Geneva
- Coordinates: 46°12′10″N 6°9′0″E
- Country: Switzerland
- Canton: Geneva
- City: Geneva

Cité-centre is an administrative term for the city center of Geneva, Switzerland.

== Geography ==
Part of the administrative sector of Genève-Cité, the Cité-centre district is divided into four main parts:

- the upper town or Cité: located on the hill overlooking Geneva and dominated by the silhouette of Saint-Pierre cathedral
- the lower town: the district of Rues basse and Rive which regroup the main shopping streets (rue de la Confédération, rue du Marché, rue de la Croix-d'Or, rue de Rive, rue du Rhône, etc.) as well as some of the oldest squares in the city (Molard, Fusterie and Longemalle)
- the districts of Tranchées and Saint-Léger located at the site of the ancient eastern fortifications of Geneva
- Hollande's banking district and the one surrounding Parc des Bastions

The old town of Geneva, which constituted the medieval fortified city, is made up of Cité-centre and the district of Saint-Gervais. Cité-center occupies the left bank of the Rhône, and Saint-Gervais the right bank.
