= List of Achimotans =

Notable alumni of Achimota School

Notable Achimotans listed below are either alumni ("Akoras") or were affiliated to Achimota School as teachers. According to the Constitution of the Old Achimotan Association (OAA), alumni members who completed a full course of study and teachers who taught at the school for at least five years are considered to be full members of the OAA, and are known as Akoras. Notable Akoras are those Achimotans that have excelled or played a pioneering role in their field.

== Notable alumni ==
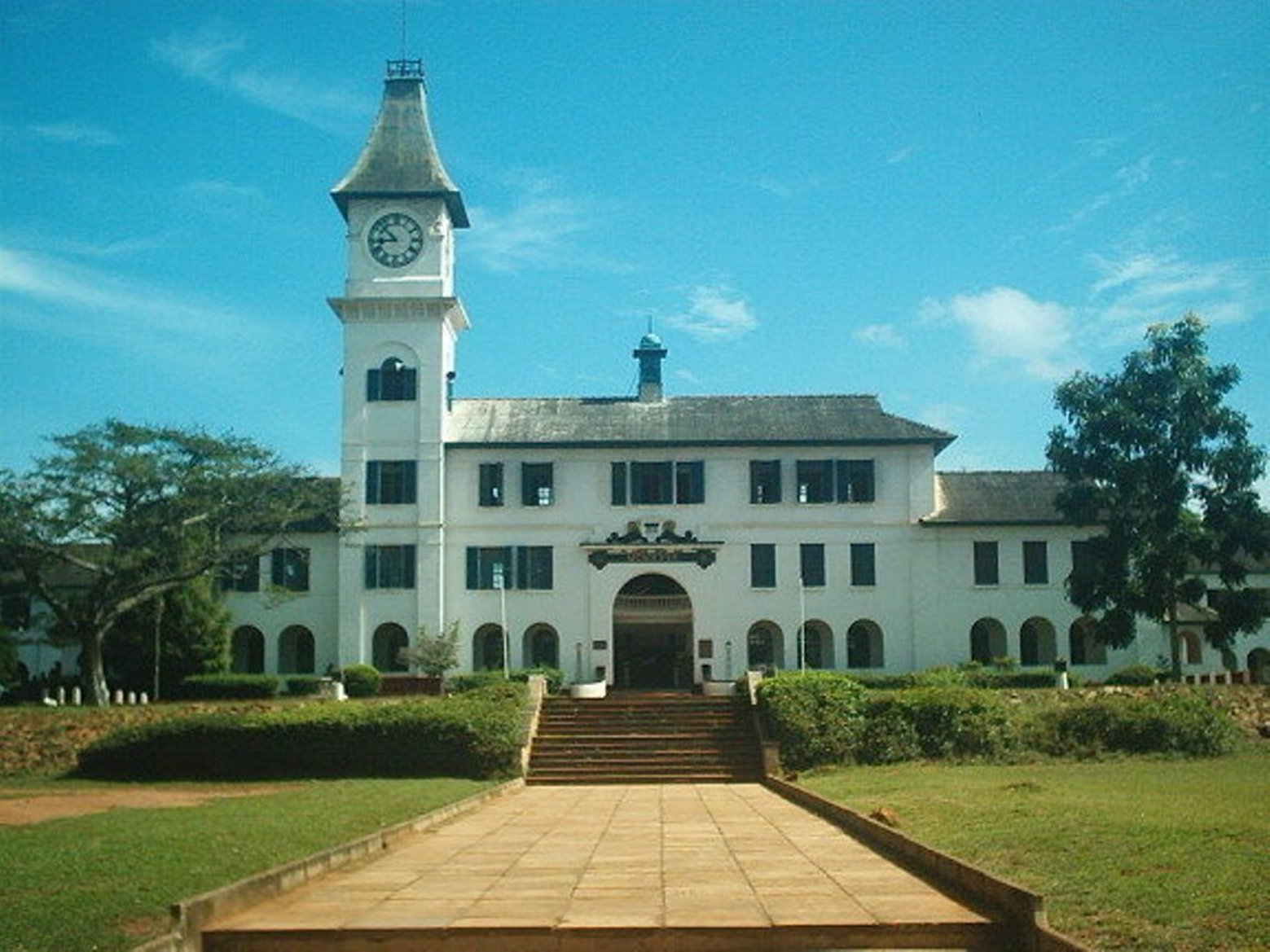
Achimota School

=== Political leaders ===
- Edward Akufo-Addo, President, Second Republic of Ghana (1969–72)
- Kow Nkensen Arkaah, first Vice President, Fourth Republic of Ghana (1993–97)
- Alhaji Adamu Atta, former Governor of Kwara State, Nigeria
- Kofi Abrefa Busia, Prime Minister of Government in the 2nd Republic (1969-1972)
- Alhaji Sir Dauda Jawara, first Head of State of The Gambia (1970–94)
- John Evans Atta Mills, President of Ghana (2009–12), second Vice President, Fourth Republic of Ghana (1997-2001)
- Robert Mugabe, second President, Republic of Zimbabwe
- Kwame Nkrumah, first President of Ghana, founding member and 3rd Chairman of the Organisation of African Unity, now African Union
- Jerry John Rawlings, Head of State, Ghana, 1979, 1981–93; and President of Ghana (1993-2001)

=== Architecture ===
- Theodore S. Clerk, urban planner and the first formally trained, professionally certified Ghanaian architect of the Gold Coast, developer of the port city of Tema, first chief executive officer of Tema Development Corporation, first President of the Ghana Institute of Architects, presidential advisor to Kwame Nkrumah and recipient of the Rutland Prize from the Royal Scottish Academy.

=== Armed forces ===
- Major-General Nathan Apea Aferi, second Ghanaian Chief of Defense Staff of the Ghana Armed Forces, and former Foreign Minister
- Major Seth Anthony, diplomat and first African commissioned officer in the British Army
- Major-General (Rtd) Stephen Otu, first Ghanaian Chief of the Defence Staff of the Ghana Armed Forces
- Flight-Lieutenant (Rtd) Jerry John Rawlings, former officer of the Ghana Air Force, military Head of State, and President of Ghana
- Major-General Edwin Sam, former Chief of the Defence Staff of the Ghana Armed Forces
- Lieutenant-General Joseph Henry Smith, Ambassador to the United States, and former Chief of Army Staff
- Major Kojo Boakye-Djan, Spokesman of the Armed Forces Revolutionary Council

=== Aviation ===
- Captain Kofi Martin Ampomah, former pilot Ghana Airways, and head of the Ghana Civil Aviation Authority

=== Business ===
- T. E. Anin, Managing Director, and Chairman of the board of directors of the Ghana Commercial Bank (1972–1980)
- Ken Ofori-Atta, founder and Chairman of Databank Group; Finance minister
- Kwame Pianim, economist, consultant, and politician
- George Nenyi Andah
- J. S. Addo, former governor of the Bank of Ghana and founder of Prudential Bank
- Esther Afua Ocloo, industrialist
- Mansa Nettey CEO of Standard Chartered Bank Ghana

=== Diplomats ===
- K. B. Asante, former teacher and former Ghanaian High Commissioner to the UK
- S. K. B Asante, lawyer and International Arbitrator who has served as International Court of Arbitration of the International Chamber of Commerce, International Centre for Settlement of Investment Disputes (ICSID)
- Annan Cato, Ghana's High Commissioner to the United Kingdom
- Pauline M. Clerk, civil servant, diplomat and presidential advisor
- James Victor Gbeho, former Minister of Foreign Affairs
- Daniel Chapman-Nyaho, former Ghanaian ambassador to the United States of America; first African headmaster of Achimota College
- Ebenezer Moses Debrah, former diplomat
- Isaac Osei, former Ghanaian High Commissioner to the UK, and Chief Executive of COCOBOD
- Abraham Benjamin Bah Kofi, diplomat
- Alex Quaison-Sackey, diplomat and Ghanaian permanent representative to the United Nations
- Joseph Henry Smith, former Ghanaian Ambassador to the United States, and former Chief of Defense Staff

=== Education ===
- Francis Agbodeka, former professor of History
- Reginald Fraser Amonoo, Retired professor of modern languages
- E. H. Amonoo-Neizer, former Vice Chancellor, KNUST
- Ernest Aryeetey, former Vice-Chancellor, University of Ghana
- Mary Ashun, Principal of Ghana International School
- Patrick Awuah Jr., President and founder of Ashesi University
- E. Bamfo-Kwakye, former Vice-Chancellor, KNUST
- Kankam Twum Barima, former professor of Agriculture, KNUST
- Daniel Adzei Bekoe, former Vice-Chancellor, University of Ghana
- George Benneh - former vice-chancellor of the University of Ghana
- Ernest Amano Boateng, first vice chancellor of the University of Cape Coast
- Kenneth Dike, first African Vice-Chancellor, University of Ibadan
- Emmanuel Evans-Anfom, physician and former Vice-Chancellor of the KNUST
- F. O. Kwami, former Vice Chancellor, KNUST
- Alexander Kwapong, former Vice Chancellor of the University of Ghana, and former Vice Rector of the UN University in Tokyo, Japan
- Ebenezer Laing, botanist and geneticist
- Ivan Addae Mensah, former Vice-Chancellor, University of Ghana
- Lawrence Henry Yaw Ofosu-Appiah, former Classics Professor, University of Ghana
- Akilagpa Sawyerr, former vice-chancellor of the University of Ghana
- Isabella Akyinbah Quakyi, professor of Immunology and Parasitology at the University of Ghana and the Foundation Dean of the University of Ghana School of Public Health

=== Government ===
- Richard Abusua-Yedom Quarshie, former Minister for Trade and Industry (1969-1972)
- Kwame Addo-Kufuor, MP and former Minister of Defense
- Kwadwo Afari-Gyan, former Electoral Commissioner
- Osei Owusu Afriyie, Minister of state in the first republic
- Joseph Godson Amamoo, former deputy Minister of state in the second republic
- Austin Amissah, former Attorney General (January, 1979- September, 1979)
- Patrick Dankwa Anin, former Minister for Foreign Affairs and Supreme Court Judge
- Daniel Francis Annan, first Speaker of Parliament, Fourth Republic of Ghana
- Kwabena Kwakye Anti, former Minister for Local Government (1969-1971)
- Susanna Al-Hassan, Ghana's first female Minister of State
- Kankam Twum Barima, former Minister of Agriculture (1969)
- Eunice Brookman-Amissah, Minister of Health (1996 - 1998)
- Bashiru Kwaw-Swanzy, former Attorney General of Ghana
- Joyce R. Aryee, former PNDC Secretary, chief executive officer of the Ghana Chamber of Mines and executive director of the Salt and Light Ministries
- Obed Asamoah, former Attorney General and Minister for Foreign Affairs in the Fourth Republic of Ghana
- Jones Ofori Atta, former deputy Minister for Finance (1969-1972)
- William Ofori Atta, co-leader of Ghana Independence Movement, former Minister for Education, Culture and Sports, 1970–71; and former Minister of Foreign Affairs
- Samuel Wilberforce Awuku-Darko, former Minister for Works (1969-1971)
- Ekwow Spio Garbrah, Minister of Trade and Industries, former Ambassador to the United States, and former Minister of Education, and former Secretary of the CTO
- Ramatu Baba, first female District Commissioner in Ghana and member of parliament during the first republic
- Charles de Graft Dickson, Minister of state in the first republic
- Modjaben Dowuona, first Registrar of the University of Ghana; Minister for Education (1966–1969)
- Komla Agbeli Gbedemah, former Finance Minister
- Samuel Phillip Gyimah, British MP, former Parliamentary Private Secretary to David Cameron, Minister for Universities in the Theresa May government
- Walter Horace Kofi-Sackey, former deputy Minister for Works (1969-1972)
- Alan John Kyerematen, former Ambassador to the United States, Minister of Trade and Industries
- Lawrence Rosario Abavana, Minister of state in the first republic
- Erasmus Ransford Tawiah Madjitey, CBE, first Ghanaian Commissioner of the Ghana Police Force, diplomat, and politician
- J. H. Mensah, former Finance Minister of Ghana, MP (1969–72), Leader of Government Business (2001), Senior Minister (2001-07)
- Amon Nikoi, former Governor of the Bank of Ghana (1973 - 1977) and Minister of Finance (1979 - 1981)
- Gloria Amon Nikoi (née Addae), first female Minister of Foreign Affairs
- Kofi Asante Ofori-Atta, fourth Speaker of Parliament, First Republic of Ghana
- Yaw Osafo-Maafo, former parliamentarian and former Finance Minister, adjudged Africa's Best Finance Minister in 2001 by the Banker Magazine of the Financial Times
- K.G. Osei Bonsu, former Minister of State (Protocol) (1969-1972)
- Victor Owusu, former Attorney General and Foreign Minister (1969–72)
- Richard Kwame Peprah, former Minister of Finance
- Kwame Safo-Adu, former Minister for Agriculture (1969-1972)
- Emmanuel Gyekye Tanoh, Minister for Health (1984-1986), Minister of Chieftaincy Affairs (1986-1988), and Attorney General of Ghana (1988-1993)

=== Health services ===
- Oblempong Nii Kojo Ababio V , traditional ruler and first Ghanaian dental surgeon
- Victor Asare Bampoe, physician, HIV/AIDS control and public health expert, deputy Minister of Health (2014–2017)
- Alexander Adu Clerk, psychiatrist and specialist in sleep medicine
- Matilda J. Clerk, second Ghanaian female physician
- Silas Dodu, pioneer cardiologist
- Adukwei Hesse, physician-academic, tuberculosis control expert, prison reform advocate and Presbyterian minister
- Docia Kisseih, pioneer nurse and first Ghanaian Chief nursing officer also honoured on 100 cedis note
- Felix Konotey-Ahulu - sickle-cell expert
- Charles Odamtten Easmon, first Ghanaian surgeon and first Dean of University of Ghana Medical School
- Susan Ofori-Atta, first Ghanaian female physician
- Fred T. Sai, physician and family planning advocate
- Jaswant Wadwhani, former Commanding Officer, 37 Military Hospital

=== Legal and judiciary ===
- Dixon Kwame Afreh, judge and academic; justice of the Supreme Court of Ghana (2002–2003)
- Benjamin Teiko Aryeetey, Justice of the Supreme Court of Ghana (2009–2011)
- Janapare Bartels-Kodwo, Justice of the Supreme Court of Ghana (2025–)
- Kwamena Bentsi-Enchill, judge and academic; justice of the Supreme Court of Ghana (1971–1972)
- Anna Bossman, former Acting Commissioner of the Commission on Human Rights and Administrative Justice (CHRAJ)
- Samuel Kofi Date-Bah, judge and academic; justice of the Supreme Court of Ghana (2003–2013)
- Josiah Ofori Boateng, Justice of the Supreme Court of Ghana (1999–2001); Electoral Commissioner of Ghana (1989–1992)
- Samuel Azu Crabbe, Chief Justice of Ghana (1972–1977)
- Annie Ruth Jiagge, first woman in Ghana and the Commonwealth of Nations to become a judge
- Justice Akua Kuenyehia, first African to service as Chief Justice of the World Court at the Hague
- George Mcvane Richard Francois, formerly justice of the Supreme Court of Ghana
- George Lamptey, justice of the Supreme Court of Ghana (2000–2002)
- G. S. Lassey, justice of the Supreme Court of Ghana (1965–1966) and Appeals Court judge (1966–1980s)
- Thomas A. Mensah, judge and academic; first president of the International Tribunal for the Law of the Sea.
- Charles Onyeama, retired justice of the Supreme Court of Nigeria
- Justice E. N. P. Sowah, former Chief Justice of Ghana
- Gertrude Torkornoo, Chief Justice of Ghana (2023–2025)
- Seth Twum, Justice of the Supreme Court of Ghana (2002–2007)

=== Mass media ===
- Kwaku Sakyi-Addo, journalist, two-time winner of Journalist of the Year Award and Ghana's former correspondent for the BBC and Reuters
- William Frank Kobina Coleman, Director General of the Ghana Broadcasting Corporation (1960–1970)
- Berla Mundi, television anchor and presenter for TV3.
- John Dumelo, award winning Ghanaian actor.
- Stephen Bekoe Mfodwo, Director General of the Ghana Broadcasting Corporation (1970–1972)

=== Music ===
- Saka Acquaye, artist, sculptor, highlife and folk musician, co-founder of Black Beats Band and Wulomei
- Victor Kofi Agawu, music professor, Princeton University
- King Bruce, highlife musician; founder and leader of Black Beats Band; senior Civil Service official
- Philip Gbeho, classical musician and composer of Ghana's national anthem
- Kofi Ghanaba, aka "Guy Warren" Akwei, musician and drummer
- Emmanuel Gyimah Labi, composer, ethnomusicologist, pianist and former conductor of the Ghana National Symphony Orchestra
- Richie Mensah, musician and record producer
- William Chapman Nyaho, classical pianist
- Reggie Rockstone, musician and hip-life artiste
- Bernice Ofei
- DenG, singer and songwriter from Liberia
- Blitz the Ambassador, hip hop artiste and producer.

=== Politics ===
- Ebenezer Adam, member of parliament during the first republic
- Isaac Joseph Adomako-Mensah, member of parliament during the first republic
- Reginald Reynolds Amponsah
- Timothy Ansah, member of parliament during the first republic
- Dan Botwe
- Samia Nkrumah, first female Chair of the C.P.P, and former Member of Parliament of Jomoro Constituency
- Benita Sena Okity-Duah
- Gilchrist Olympio, Togolese politician and presidential candidate
- Obed Asamoah, former National chairman of the NDC

=== Science and technology ===
- Nii Quaynor, engineer and founder of NCS (now Ghana.com)
- Charles Wereko-Brobby, engineer and politician, and former chief executive officer of Volta River Authority

=== Sports ===
- Herbert Mensah, former chief executive officer of Kumasi Asante Kotoko FC
- Ernest Obeng, former world-class sprinter and Head of Broadcasting for the International Association of Athletic Federations
- Francis Dodoo, olympic athlete

=== Writers ===
- Ayi Kwei Armah, author of The Beautyful Ones Are Not Yet Born
- Kofi Awoonor, poet, teacher, and diplomat
- Cyprian Ekwensi, short-story writer, author of children's books, pharmacist and broadcaster
- Nii Ayikwei Parkes, writer, author

=== Principals and heads ===
- James Emman Kwegyir Aggrey, first vice principal and co-founder
- Rev. Alec Garden Fraser, co-founder and first principal; former principal of Trinity College, Kandy, Sri Lanka; and Gordonstoun, Scotland
- Bishop Robert Stopford, former principal and former Bishop of London

=== Former teachers ===
- Ephraim Amu, musician and composer
- John Barham, English pianist, composer, arranger, producer, choirmaster and educator
- Kofi Abrefa Busia, former teacher and former Prime Minister of Ghana in the 2nd Republic (1969 to 1972)
- Michael Cardew, potter
- Ken Kafui, musician and composer
- Charles G. Palmer-Buckle, Metropolitan Archbishop of Roman Catholic Church, Accra
- Agnes Yewande Savage, first woman in West Africa to qualify in orthodox medicine

=== Other ===
- Sally Mugabe (née Hayfron), wife of President Robert Mugabe
- Adeline Akufo-Addo (née Ofori-Atta), wife of President Edward Akufo Addo
- Nana Konadu Agyeman Rawlings, wife of President Jerry Rawlings
- Theodosia Okoh, designer of Ghana's national flag
- Grace Bediako, former Government Statistician
- Azzu Mate Kole II, Konor of Manya Krobo, 1939 - 1990
- George Briggars Williams, actor
- Elizabeth Frances Sey, first female graduate of the University of Ghana.
- Dag Heward-Mills, Bishop and founder of Lighthouse Chapel International
- Emmanuel Apea, Ghanaian actor and film director
- Chris Attoh, Ghanaian actor
- J. H. Cobbina, former Inspector General of Police of the Ghana Police Service
- Nana Wiafe Akenten II, Omanhene of Offinso Traditional Area (1946 -1959) (1966 -1993)
