= Ampomah =

Ampomah is a surname. Notable people with the surname include:

- Alberta Ampomah (born 1994), Ghanaian weightlifter
- John Ampomah (born 1990), Ghanaian javelin thrower
- Joseph Ampomah Bosompem (born 1957), Ghanaian politician
- Kofi Martin Ampomah (1933–2011), Ghanaian aviator
- Opoku Ampomah (born 1996), Ghanaian footballer
- Owusu Ampomah (born 1985), Ghanaian footballer
