= Kwame Pianim =

Ghanaian economist

Andrews Kwame Pianim is a Ghanaian economist and investment consultant. After ten years as a political prisoner, he made a 1996 bid to run for the presidency of Ghana on the ticket of the NPP but was disqualified by a Supreme Court decision.

== Early life and family ==
Pianim attended Achimota School for his secondary education. He received a B.A. Double Honours in Economics and Political Science from the University of New Brunswick, Canada (1963) and M.A. in economics from Yale University (1964), USA.

Pianim married a Dutch woman named Cornelia Pianim. Their youngest son Elkin Kwesi Pianim (born 1970), a Vassar College trained corporate financier, was married to media heiress Elisabeth Murdoch; Kwame Pianim has two grandchildren in common with Rupert Murdoch, namely Cornelia and Anna Pianim.

== Economic and finance career ==
As an economist, his philosophy is multi-dimensional, but a consistent theme has been the essential incompatibility between the economic agenda of poor nations, or what ought to be their economic agenda, and the priorities of the Bretton Woods system.

Pianim was chairman of the board at UBA Ghana from the bank's inception in Ghana in 2004 till 2014. He has been chairman of the board at Bayport Financial Services since 2002 and has also chaired the boards of Airtel Communications Ghana and e-Tranzact. He has also been school board chair at Ghana International School.

== Politics ==
He was arrested with a group of soldiers including Sgt. Akata Pore on 23 November 1982 following the capture of part of Gondar Barracks, Burma Camp in an apparent abortive coup attempt.

His attempts to contest the 1996 presidential elections on the ticket of the centre-right New Patriotic Party were scuppered when the Supreme Court ruled to uphold a controversial law preventing individuals convicted of treasonous acts from holding public office, even if such acts were committed during periods of unconstitutional rule.

Following the Court's decision, he resigned from politics to focus on private activities within the realm of development economics.

Following an economic crisis in Ghana under the presidency of Nana Addo Dankwa Akufo-Addo, he voiced his concerns about the direction of government activities in July 2023.

== Recent activities ==
In 2001, he was appointed the chairman of the Public Utility Regulation Council (PURC) of Ghana, a high-level commission tasked with the responsibility of overseeing and regulating electricity and water utilities. He resigned in December 2007 as a result of differences with the then ruling NPP government of John A. Kufuor. He is the President of Old Achimotans Association.
