= Herbert Mensah =

Ghanaian businessman

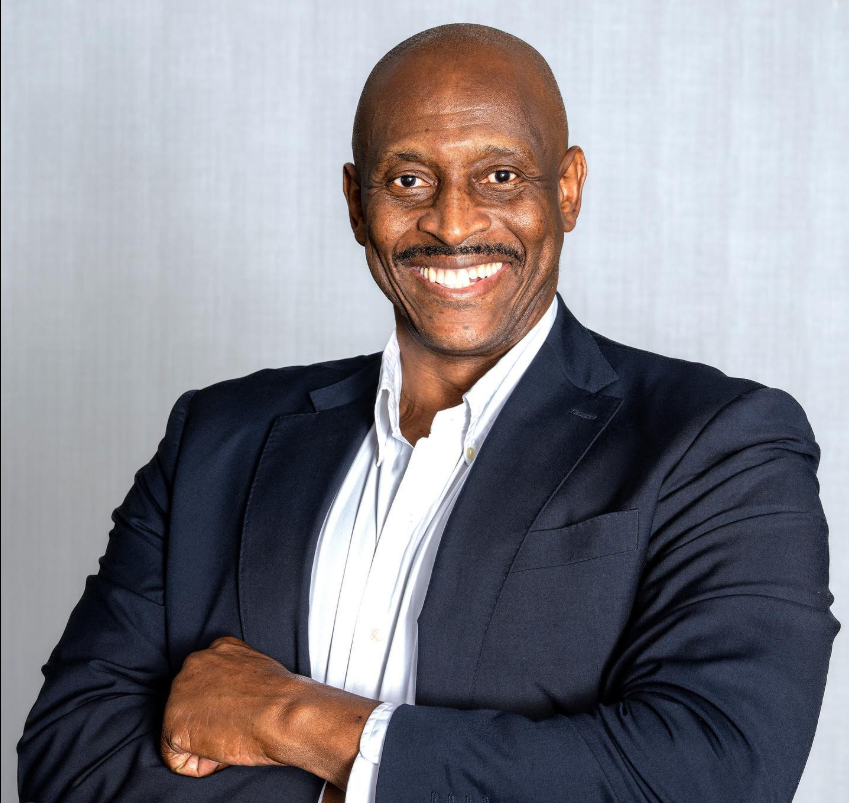
Herbert Mensah, Rugby Africa President

Herbert Amponsah Mensah (born in Kumawu on 26 December.) is a Ghanaian businessman, sports administrator, and the President of World Rugby’s African association, Rugby Africa, the governing body of Rugby in Africa. He was also the president of the Ghana Rugby Association (GRA) operating as the Ghana Rugby Football Union (GRFU).

== Education and entry into business ==
Mensah is an alumnus of Achimota Secondary School in Accra, Ghana, although he completed his O levels in the UK and later obtained his graduate degree in economics at Sussex University. In his younger years, he played rugby for Sussex and Saracens. He entered the business world while still a student and gained business experience, among other places, in the tobacco industry in Zimbabwe. His entrepreneurship led to his pursuit of success in the telecommunications industry. In the early nineties, he identified cellphones as a boom industry and went on to become the biggest mobile handset distributor in sub-Saharan Africa, outside South Africa, where he led the market in distributing Motorola, Sony, Ericsson, and Nokia. By 2007, he had established a level-3 Motorola and Nokia-certified mobile phone and repair centre in Accra.

In 1994, he identified the opportunity of South African pay-TV broadcaster M-Net and helped to spread this service to the rest of Africa. In 1995, he represented the BBC in Ghana and became the liaison with media and government regarding all aspects of radio, programming, marketing, and PR. He later became the country manager for satellite-TV service MultiChoice to Ghana.

== Land Rover discovery tour of West Africa ==
In 1996 Herbert Mensah fixed the Land Rover rugby discovery tour of west Africa that included Ghana and Ivory Coast. The rugby tour was sponsored by Land Rover and meant to raise charity funds for Max Brito, an Ivorian rugby national team player who got paralysed during a 1995 rugby union World Cup game in South Africa between Ivory Coast and Tonga.

The tour was dubbed 'The last amateur tour'. the idea of the tour was originated in 1995 during the rugby World Cup by an England rugby union footballer Harvey Thorneycroft who led a group of amateur English rugby union footballers growing to become professionals and they collaborated with the South African Rugby team, for this tour to west Africa to play in Ghana and Ivory Coast and teach little kids in those countries the basics of the rugby game whiles raising funds to support Max Brito.

Though the idea was brilliant, the tour team needed a man on the ground in West Africa who had the wherewithal to fix the practical difficulties in organising such a tour in West Africa.

When he was contacted, Herbert Mensah facilitated travel arrangements for all the players from England and South Africa. Mensah also got Ghanaian international footballers playing in the English league at the time such as Tony Yeboah and others involved to raise massive local interest in the charity games. He also got local sponsorship including from the 5-star Labardi beach hotel involved in hosting the Max Brito tour. Other sponsors included airline companies operating in Ghana. Mensah, a former rugby union footballer himself guaranteed payment in case of damage or financial loss and accepted the risk for liability arising from such guarantee to the tour team, according to Harvey Thorneycroft.

With strong connection to President Jerry John Rawlings of Ghana in 1996, Mensah gained official recognition and participation for the 1996 rugby discovery tour in Ghana with President Rawlings attending and ordering military aircraft displays over the Accra stadium during the charity games which also involved soccer games with the national team the black stars.

Whiles in Ghana, Herbert Mensah got the touring rugby union footballers into the ''get into Ghanaian hospitality'' tour where the players applied themselves to teaching little Ghanaian kids how to play rugby football. The last amateur tour was the first and last of its kind in world rugby history.

== Football Administration ==
He was appointed board chairman of the popular Ghanaian football club Kumasi Asante Kotoko SC by the then Asantehene, Otumfuo Opoku Ware II, in 1999. Mensah set out to restore the success of earlier glories of the then failing club by implementing a five-year plan, which included sponsorships, the introduction of professional training facilities, and a transparent financial approach to the books. He left Kotoko in 2003 and later became involved in running a rival club in the Ashanti area, AshGold. In December 2004, Kotoko was runner-up in the African Cup Winners’ Cup and went on to achieve more success in the years that followed.

A well known sports journalist in Ghana, Kwabena Yeboah, described Herbert Mensah as "the greatest leader he has ever met at the Porcupine Warriors" due to his endeavours on and off the field.

Mensah has been credited with making a major contribution to changing the face of Ghanaian profession football. By 2004, he had established the SOS (Strategic Outsourcing Solutions) network. It provided management services to football and continues to be a link between grass-roots sport and the professional world.

In 2007, he teamed up with Prosport International to nurture players with exceptional talents.

== Ghana Football Association ==
Mensah has been critical of the Ghana football association and its leadership for the poor performance of Ghana's national soccer team. In 2022 he criticised the GFA and demanded an apology to Ghanaians after the team's abysmal performance at the 2022 AFCON in Cameroon. He also remains hopeful in the chances of the Ghana national football team qualifying for the FIFA World Cup in Qatar.

== Presidency of Ghana Rugby ==
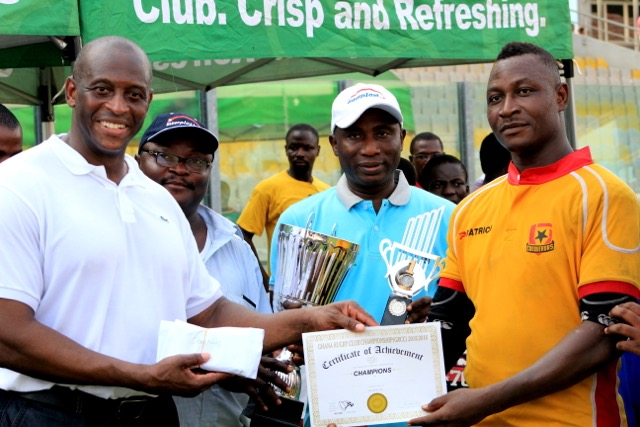
Mr. Herbert Mensah presenting a certificate of achievement and the winner's trophy of the 2016 Ghana Rugby Club Championship to the winning captain of Conquerors SC.

Prior to his appointment as President of Ghana Rugby, Mensah was appointed to the executive of the Greater Accra Rugby Association (GARA) in May 2014. At the occasion, he stressed the importance to build infrastructure to motivate the youth and to grow the game of rugby in Ghana. On assuming office, his first priority was to order an assessment of the state of rugby in Ghana by his Board Members. He travelled to Dublin to meet with officials of World Rugby to seek guidance on the development of Rugby in Ghana. The meeting was followed up with a meeting, also in Dublin, with the Rugby Africa Development Manager.

He also met with various stakeholders including regional associations, clubs, players and the business community.

On Friday, 29 August 2014, Mensah convened a Ghana Rugby Stakeholder Forum in Accra, where the Ghana Rugby Blueprint was presented.

He also arranged training sessions for both coaches and referees to improve the quality of the sport in Ghana. The coaches' training conducted by Mr David Dobela of South Africa was described as a historical event for Ghana Rugby as it was the first time in 11 years that coaches were trained on both Level 1 and Level 2 for rugby union and Sevens coaching.

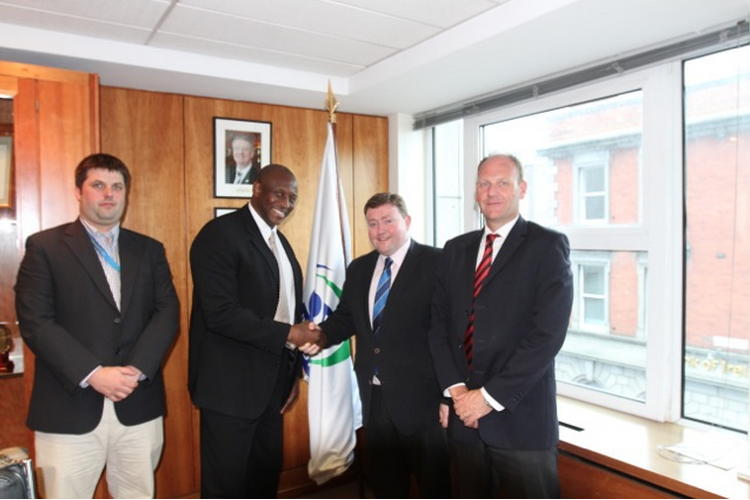
Herbert Mensah, President of Ghana Rugby, meeting with David Carrigy and Morgan Buckley of World Rugby in Dublin, Ireland in July 2014.

Based on his consultations with both World Rugby and Rugby Africa, Mensah realised that a stumbling block in the way of Ghana Rugby to become a full member of World Rugby was the successful completion of a successfully run local league by at least ten clubs. He immediately mobilised his resources, and planned and completed the first professionally run Ghana Rugby Club Championship (GRCC).

One of Mensah's major challenges as president of Ghana Rugby remains funding the sport and he has initiated various activities including a raffle ticket drive. He also managed to get corporates such as Accra Brewery, Interplast Ghana, Vodafone Ghana and Zen Petroleum involved in supporting Ghana Rugby. In collaboration with the Vodafone Ghana management team he staged a management motivational event using the values and principles of rugby to help Vodafone prepare its management for year ahead.

He has challenged the Government of Ghana on more than one occasion about support promised to minority sports such as rugby that has never been delivered. He remains a vocal critic of other government failures well beyond the realm of sport.

After the 2015/16 Ghana Rugby Club Championship, Mensah, in the absence of a National Technical Director, appointed a four-man technical squad under his guidance to prepare the Ghana national men's sevens team for its Africa Rugby international commitment. The technical team consisting of Messrs. Simba Mangena (Head Coach of Conquerors SC), Clement Dennis (Player / Coach of Griffons RFC), Amuzuloh Salim (Head Coach of Cosmos Buffaloes RFC) and Dan Hoppe (Idas Sports RFC) put the squad of 25 players through a rigorous training programme that ended in April 2016. This was followed by Phase II of the preparation that started early May when a reduced squad of 16 players started camping in Accra.

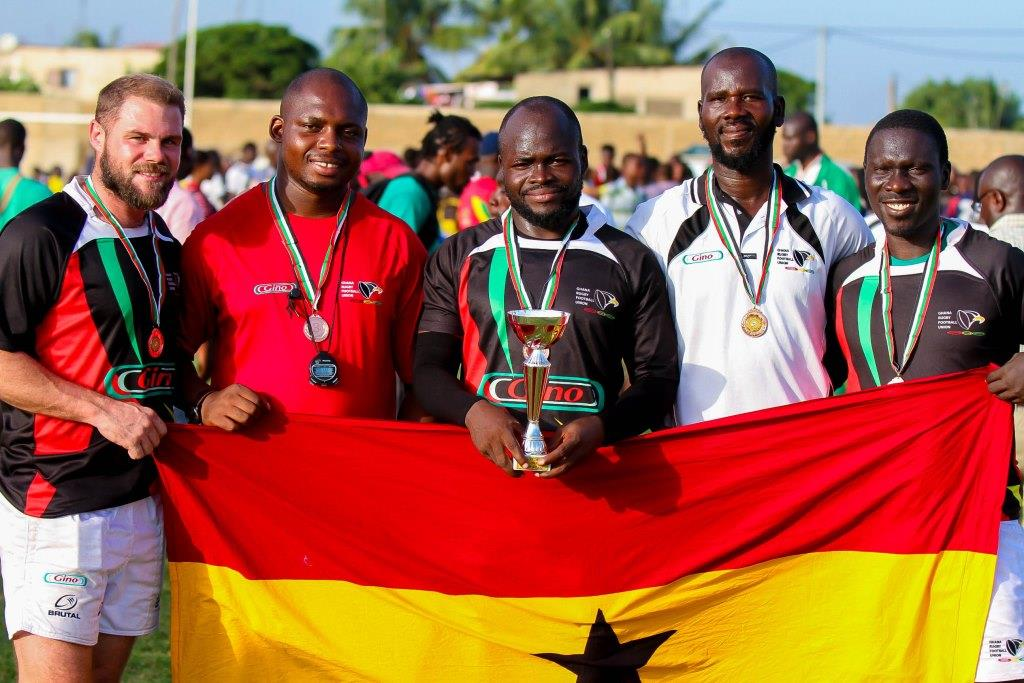
The Ghana national men's sevens Rugby team managed to lift the bronze cup in the 2016 Africa Rugby “Africa Cup West” tournament in Lome, Togo on 28 May 2016.

The final squad of 12 players who competed in the Africa Rugby "Africa Cup West" men's sevens tournament in Lome, Togo on 28 May 2016 consisted of: Dan Hoppe (Idas Sports RFC), Clement Dennis (Griffons RFC), Sani Alhassan (Captain)(Cosmos Buffaloes RFC), Alex Dorpenyo (Conquerors SC), Seidu Razak (Conquerors SC), Solomon Akumba (Cosmos Buffaloes RFC), Michael Acquaye (Conquerors SC), Calestus Bosoka (Conquerors SC), Emmanuel Kalos (Conquerors SC), Joseph Mensah (Griffons RFC), Erick Acquah (Griffons RFC) and Nasiru Aminu (Conquerors SC).

The Ghana Eagles, as the Ghana national Rugby team is known, managed to lift the Bronze or Third Place cup after it was ranked as number one based on the Pool results.

== Presidency of Rugby Africa. ==
Herbert Mensah was elected President of World Rugby’s African Association, Rugby Africa, the governing body of Rugby in Africa, on March 18, 2023 He is the first Anglophone President since the establishment of Rugby Africa. He was elected alongside a new Executive Committee. In June 2023 Mensah was a key note speaker during the Bloomberg New Economy Gateway Africa event in Morocco where he called for change of mindset to see sports in Africa as a big business.

== World Rugby Executive Board Membership ==
In less than two (2) years after his election to the Presidency of Rugby Africa, Herbert Mensah was elected as a member of the World Rugby Executive Board on Thursday, November 14th 2024 in Dublin, Ireland.

== Ghana State Honour (Order Of The Volta - Member) ==
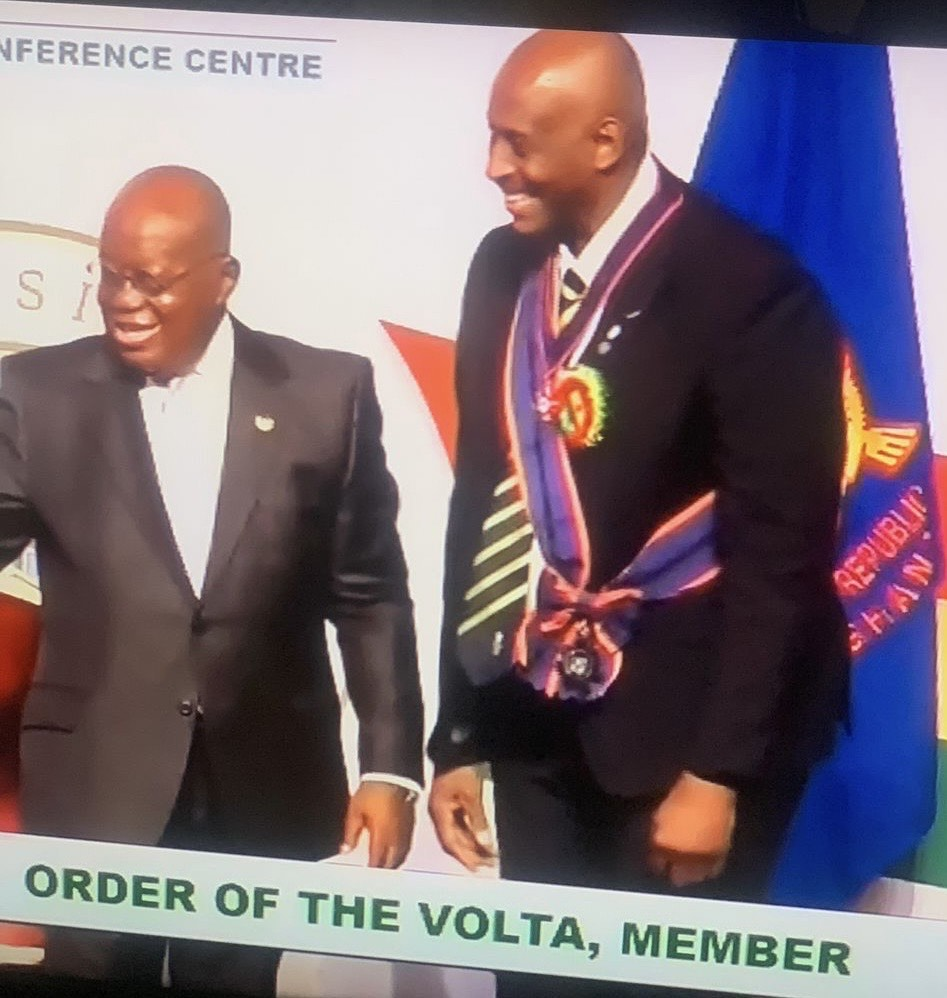
Herbert Mensah and President Nana Akuffo-Addo at the National Awards Ceremony in Accra, December 2024.

Herbert Mensah received the prestigious state award of Ghana, Order Of The Volta Member from President Nana Addo Danquah Akuffo-Addo at the 2024 National Honours Awards at Accra. The state recognition with one of the highest national honours of the country highlighted Mensah's contributions to the development of sports in Ghana and Africa. The Order Of The Volta, Ghana's second highest honour celebrates individuals who have made prominent contributions to the country across various fields

== Recognition with Living Legend Award at the 2025 Ghana Football Awards ==
At the 2025 edition of the Ghana Football Awards, Herbert Mensah, President of Rugby Africa and former Asante Kotoko chairman, was honoured with the prestigious Living Legend Award. The recognition celebrated his decades-long contribution to sports development in Ghana, particularly his leadership in football and his ongoing efforts to promote rugby across Africa. Mensah's impact on sports administration, athlete welfare, and youth development earned widespread praise from both local and international sporting communities.

== Sponsoring & Winning With the Ghana Eagles ==
Mensah has won many laurels with the Ghana national rugby football team, the Ghana Eagles, as its President and main financier in recent years. The team won a game over Algeria in Kampala Uganda in July 2021 in a 2023 world cup qualifiers in France. The Ghana Eagles also hosted and won the Africa Mens 7s championship in Kumasi Ghana in November 2021. The Africa Mens 7s world cup qualification tournament in the West Africa region was supported by the King of Asante Otumfuo Osei Tutu II. After Ghana's male and female teams both won the tournament, the winning cup and the players were presented to the King of Asante by Herbert Mensah.

The President of Ghana Nana Akufo Addo gave the Ghana rugby national team 100K USD when the team led by President of Ghana rugby Herbert Mensah paid a courtesy call on him at the flag staff house in Accra Ghana.

== Joining Rugby Africa Executive Committee ==
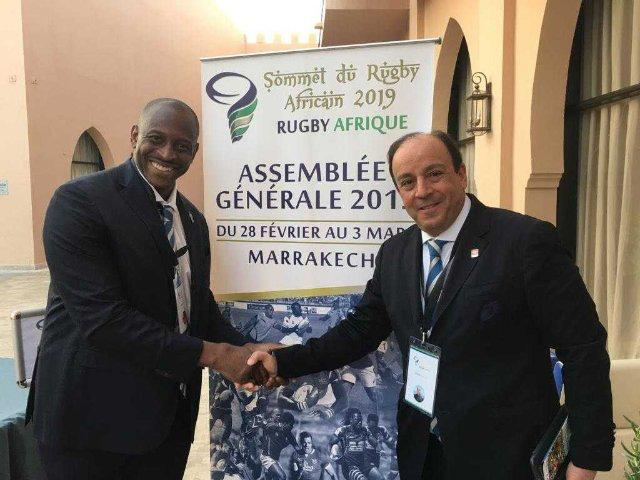
Khaled Babbou, President of Africa Rugby in a hand shake with Herbert Mensah, President of Ghana Rugby and member of EXCO of Africa Rugby

Mensah's progressive development of the rugby game in Ghana and in compliance with world rugby standards over the past few years gained greater recognition in 2019 when he was appointed a member of the Africa Rugby Executive committee.

The new governing board was constituted and convened for Africa Rugby in Marrakech - Morocco on 2 March 2019. President of Africa Rugby Khaled Babbou announced Mensah's appointment as a representative of Rugby Africa whiles inviting him to the first continental board meeting of the year.

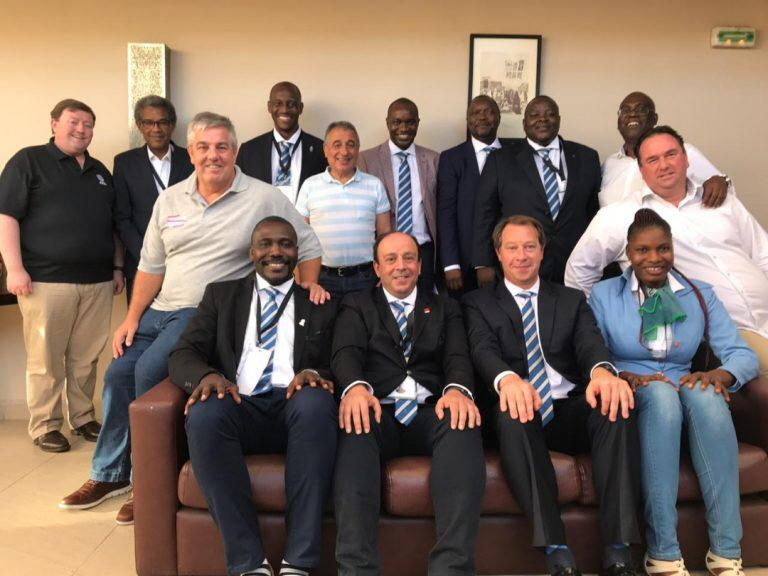
Executive Committee members of Africa Rugby Federation pose for a group picture in Marrakech- Morocco on 2 March 2019 during their first board meeting

Herbert Mensah, who initially put forward his personal bid to take over as President of Africa Rugby at the Marrakech summit, announced his withdrawal from the race shortly before the declaration of President Khaled Babbou and Mensah's subsequent appointment unto the governing board of Africa Rugby.

During the Africa Rugby Summit in Morocco, Ghana Rugby Football union(GRFU), of which Mensah is the President, also received an outstanding award from the continental rugby body for ''Best Communication strategy'' as part of the 2019 rugby Africa awards night held in Marrakech-Morocco.

Rugby Africa recognised Ghana Rugby and Herbert Mensah for employing social media and the mass media in general to develop, advance and make the professional game of rugby popular in Ghana and Africa at large.

=== Full Membership of World Rugby ===
On 10 May 2017 the World Rugby Council approved the application by the Ghana Rugby Football Union as a full member union, bringing the total number to 104 full members and 17 associates.

In announcing the achievement World Rugby Chairman Bill Beaumont said: "We are delighted to be welcoming Ghana as a full member of World Rugby. These are very exciting times for our sport with unprecedented growth and interest around the world. With today's announcement, we look forward to a strong, well-organised game in Ghana and we are glad that the union is now ready to join the global rugby family as a full member and continue its work growing the game in Africa.”

=== Commitment To Development of Women In Ghana Rugby ===
In 2019, World Rugby, the global governing body of rugby football unions announced a global campaign to revolutionize women's participation in the game of rugby world-wide.

The campaign Dubbed ''Try And Stop Us'' is aimed globally at encouraging and increasing participation among fans, players and investors in the women's game of rugby.

In Ghana, Herbert Mensah, President of Ghana Rugby and the union has for the past two years, in compliance with a World Rugby youth development program ''Get Into Rugby'' focused on recruiting, training, coaching and inspiring the next generation of young women rugby players in Ghana through basic schools.

Ghana Rugby in the past two seasons organized women's sevens tournaments alongside men's fifteens. It is the aim of women in Ghana Rugby to compete in international tournaments in the near future.

=== Other Achievements in 2017 ===
Besides for the promotion to Full Membership of World Rugby, Ghana Rugby also experienced a memorable year in other areas.

==== Winner of Rugby Africa Regional Challenge - West 1 ====
Ghana Rugby was awarded the hosting rights for the 2017 Rugby Africa Regional Challenge - West 1 between Benin, Ghana and Togo in Accra, Ghana.

Ghana Rugby managed to win the tournament by beating Benin 46 - 5 and Togo 10 - 0 to lift the Regional Challenge Trophy.

==== Ranking on Rugby Africa Men's Sevens Log ====
Ghana Rugby competed for the first time in the Rugby Africa Men's Sevens Tournament in Kampala-Uganda by beating Mauritius 26 to 0 to be placed 9th in the Africa Men's Sevens Tournament.

The competition was played between ten of Africa's best nations between 6 and 7 October 2017 in Kampala-Uganda.

==== Promotion to Rugby Africa 2018 Bronze Cup ====
Ghana Rugby ended 2017 on a high note when was promoted from the Rugby Africa Regional Challenge to the 2018 Rugby Africa Bronze Cup.

The announcement that was issued by Rugby Afrique said that the Rugby Africa Bronze Cup will take place from 9 to 12 May in Accra, Ghana between Ghana, Lesotho, Mauritius and Rwanda.

=== Re-election as President and Board Chairman of Ghana Rugby ===
On 25 September 2017 Ghana Rugby elected a new Board and Officers based on a newly adopted Constitution. Mensah was elected as President and Board Member by the GRFU constitutional electorate and he was subsequently appointed as Board Chairman by the newly elected Board.

World Rugby Chairman Bill Beaumont and the CEO of World Rugby, Brett Gosper, congratulated Mensah and the GRFU Board in a joint statement and said that they "look forward to continuing to work with you and the Board going forward".

In February 2020 he was re-elected President by the Ghana Rugby Football Union. He run unchallenged at a Special General Meeting and was also reappointed Board Chairman for a term spanning four years.

== Board Member of The Ghana Olympic Committee (GOC) ==
Mr. Herbert Mensah with the 2018 Commonwealth Games baton in Accra, Ghana.

Herbert Mensah was elected as one of the five representatives for Olympic Sports on the Board of the Ghana Olympic Committee (GOC) on 15 March 2017.

Soon after his appointment to the GOC Board, Mensah said that he and his Rugby administration have their eyes set on world cups for Ghana Rugby at a gala dinner organised by the Australian High Commission in partnership with the Azumah Nelson foundation, the Ghana Olympic Committee and the Gold Coast Commonwealth Games Corporation to receive the Queen's Commonwealth Baton Relay to Ghana.

=== Chair of GOC Media Relations Sub-Committee ===
Mensah was also appointed as Chair of the GOC's Media Relations Sub-Committee that will spearhead the agenda of effective communication from the GOC.

== May 9th Remembered ==
At the time of the Accra Sports Stadium Disaster on 9 May 2001, Mensah was still the chairman of Asante Kotoko SC. He actively took part in rescue operations and in carrying the bodies of the dead from the stands to the field.

Since 2001, he has "religiously" commemorated the tragedy in support of the families of the victims with events in both Accra and Kumasi. In 2021 Mr. Mensah also received a pledge of support and endorsement from the Ghanaian President for the May 9 remembered charity project

=== 2016 May 9th Commemoration ===
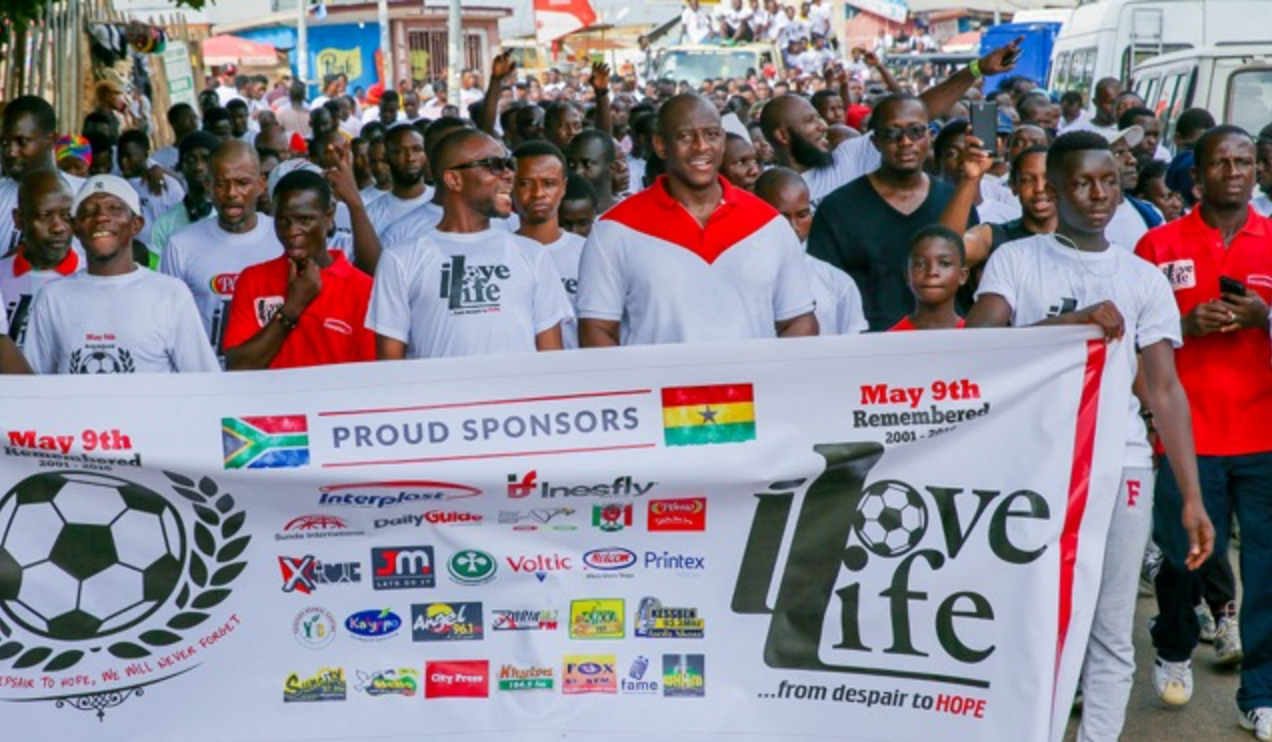
Mr. Herbert Mensah leading the May 9th Remembered 2016 street walk in Kumasi, Ghana.

The May 9 Remembered initiative introduced a new dimension in 2016 to the annual remembrance activities by Herbert Mensah in that he fulfilled a wish to bring families of the Accra Sports Stadium disaster and the Ellis Park Stadium disaster together.

Ntlakanipho Zulu and Mmakgomo Tshetlo were identified with the help of City Press in South Africa and joined the President of Ghana Rugby Association, Mr. Herbert Mensah and the May 9th Remembered organising team for the 2016 remembrance activities in Kumasi.

Ntlakanipho Zulu, who lost both his parents in the worst sporting tragedy in South African history, was 23 years old when he arrived in Ghana. According to him, it was difficult to watch football matches, particularly the much-loved derbies between Orlando Pirates and Kaizer Chiefs. Mmakgomo Matshidiso Tshetlo, who joined Ntlakanipho and who was 28 years old when visiting Ghana, saw her dad the last time during the first school holidays of the year in which he died on 11 April 2001.

The 2016 May 9 Remembered program again included a well-attended street march in Kumasi.

=== 2015 May 9th Commemoration ===
In 2015, Mensah again embarked on organizing awareness events in Accra and Kumasi.

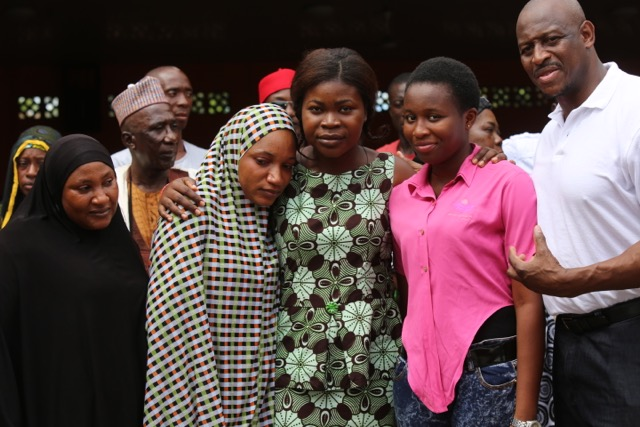
Herbert Mensah with Accra family members of the victims of the 9 May 2001 Accra Sports Stadium Disaster in May 2015.

At a ceremony at Nima organized by Mensah to bring the families of the victims in the Greater Accra and the Ashanti Regions together, Rukaya Alidu – who lost two brothers, Ahmed Samadu and Ibrahim Adi – said: “Apart from an amount of three hundred Ghana cedis extended to the family after the disaster nothing has been given to them."

The 2015 May 9 Remembered event included various activities, including a football contest organised by Mensah that was played at the Aboabo Middle ‘B’ Park with participating teams from the Zongo areas in Kumasi.

The highlight was the walk through the streets of Kumasi by thousands of people, which has become an annual tradition. Mensah stated in a media interview that, "The tragedy should make football fans more careful. They should understand they are brothers and sisters off the field and they must exhibit the positive rage that comes with soccer."

==== MAY 9 2019: Championing Charity Efforts 18 Years After Accra Stadium Disaster ====
In 2019, Ghana marked 18 years since the Accra stadium disaster claimed the lives of 127 Ghanaian soccer fans. This year also reached 18 years of efforts by some Ghanaian sports administrators to keep the memories of the victims alive through charity efforts like donations to the needy and the creation of public awareness about the need to avoid a repeat of the 2001 tragic incident.

To create public awareness, Herbert Mensah, President of the May 9 foundation led masses of people including the physically disabled people as well as students from the Kwame Nkrumah University of science and technology and the media to walk through the principal streets of Kumasi, Ghana's second largest city and the home of his former football club, Asante Kotoko FC.

Through a combination of personal resources, support from the King of Ashanti and corporate sponsorship from different organizations doing business in Ghana, 2019 saw an upscale in donations to the needy by the May 9 Foundation led by Herbert Mensah to mark the 18th annual anniversary. Again, the charity work of the May 9 foundation in 2019 extended beyond families of victims of the Accra stadium disaster. It also included victims of floods in Accra, victims of accidental gas explosions and the people living with physical disabilities.

Mensah has attributed the choice of Kumasi, the capital of the Ashanti kingdom for the yearly remembrance and charity projects of the May 9 foundation to the unflinching material and open support by Otumfuo Osei Tutu II who is also the life patron of Kumasi Asante Kotoko football club.

== Radio and TV Interviews ==
Mensah is frequently interviewed by the Ghanaian media due to his frank and open opinions.

In October 2015, he appeared on the Metro TV inaugural show of "Ghana Conversations" with Paul Adom Otchere where he said "Ghana is facing a myriad of challenges and citizens must be able to criticize constructively to push leaders to solve problems." He also appealed to the President, Mr. John Dramani Mahama, to bring Ghana to the point "where people are brought forth to be accountable, jailed, removed or dismissed as a matter of course."

== Philanthropy ==
Excelling in business and sports administration Mensah also engages in philanthropy. In Ghana, he has been involved over the years with helping flood and fire victims, poor and sick children at different times. His primary use of donations of food, household items, cash, medical bills and other donations go straight to impact the poor and victims of disaster in Ghana.

In 2018, Mensah initiated the ''Save a Sick Child'' project in collaboration with paediatric medical doctors at the Komfo Anokye Teaching Hospital in Kumasi, Ghana where he made cash donations to cover the cost of surgeries on sick children who suffer a destruction of their food pipes in the throat as a result of accidental ingestion of caustic soda, a cheap raw material used for manufacturing soap in rural communities in Ghana.

Doctors at the Komfo Anokye Teaching Hospital have raised alarm over the increasing numbers of children of poor parents mostly from remote communities who have to feed through a tube connected through the stomach, until they are able to afford the cost of undergoing a medical surgery to repair the damaged food pipe. The expensive cost of the surgery has prevented many children from going to school as their lives are a daily struggle with difficulty in swallowing even saliva.

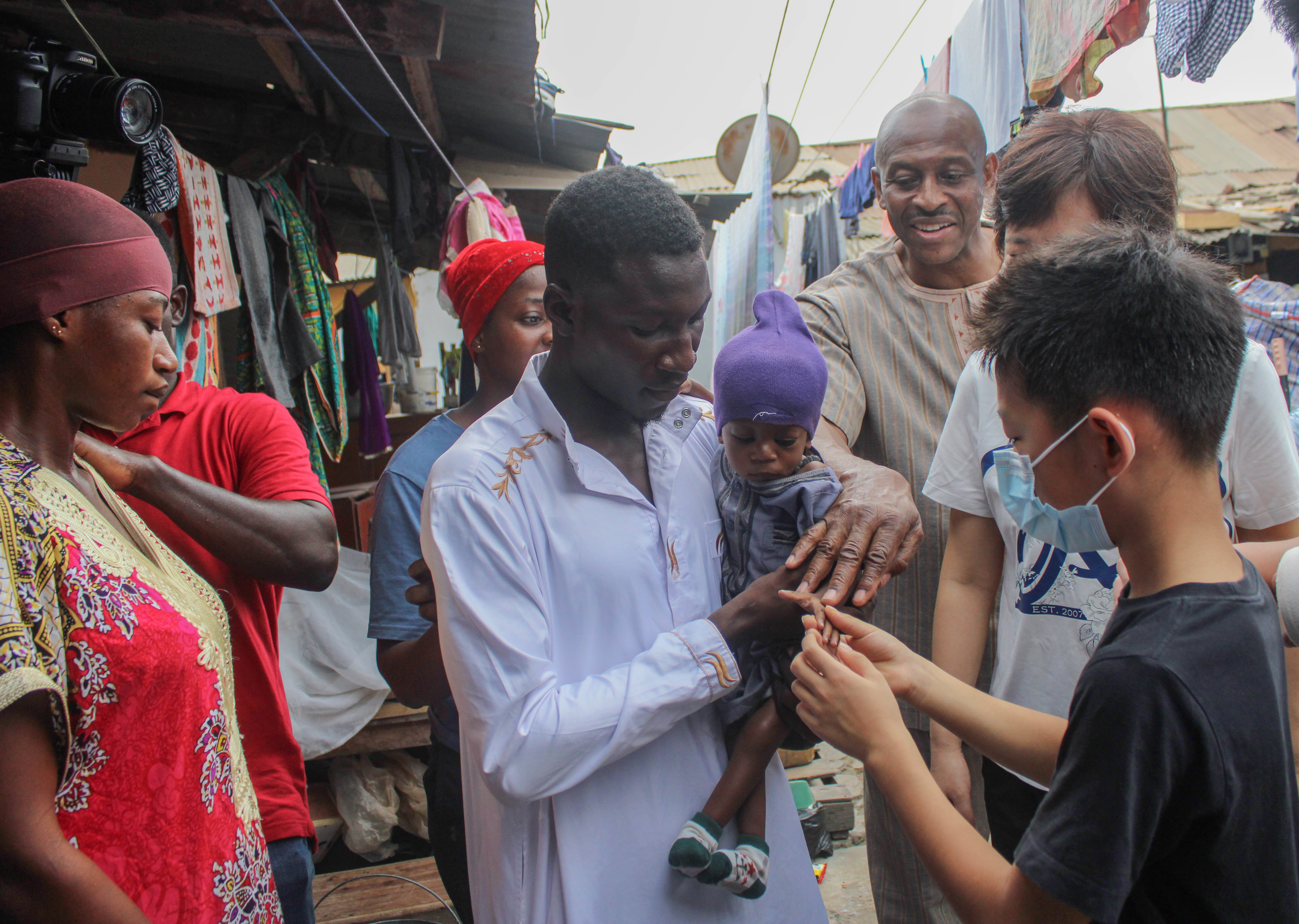
Herbert Mensah and Chinese donors interacting with families of children with hole in heart in Nima, Accra Ghana.

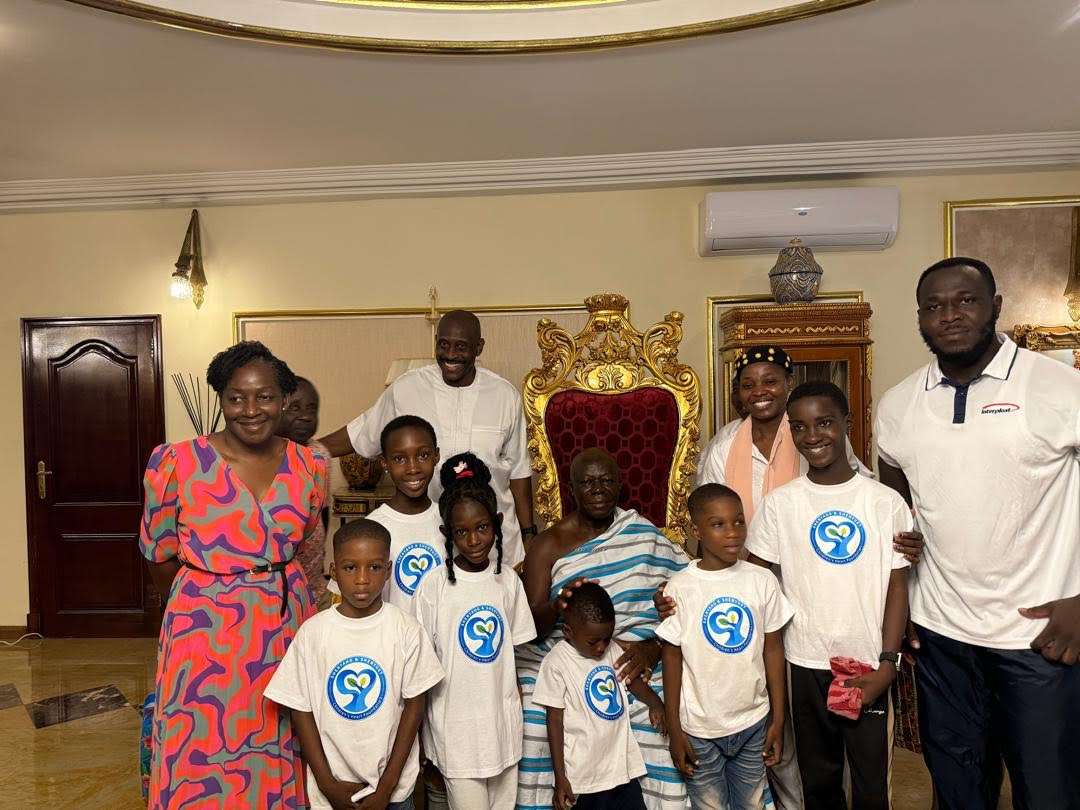
Herbert Mensah and children who survived hole-in-heart disease in Ghana surrounding the Asantehene Otumfuor Osei Tutu II”

Through the ''Save a sick child'' project, Mensah sponsored the treatment of an 11-year boy from Asankragwa in the western region of Ghana and an 8-year-old boy from Wa in the Upper West region of Ghana. In January 2023, as part of his charity initiatives, Herbert Mensah brought his foreign associates and Chinese investors in Ghana, SUNDA & KEDA International Group of Companies and their related charity foundation, the Shen Yang and the Shen Yuet Children's Heart Foundation to agree to pay for the high cost of treating some children in Ghana with hole in heart disease for the next 10 years. As at May 2024, more than 25 children suffering from hole in heart disease in Ghana have received successful treatment under the auspices of the Shen Yang and shen Yuet heart foundation. Herbert Mensah who is secretary of the charity foundation accompanied the children who survived the hole-in-heart disease to visit the Asante King Otumfuo Osei Tutu II during his silver jubilee celebrations in Kumasi in May 2024 In 2017, After the Atomic Junction Gas Explosion in Accra, Ghana, Herbert Mensah led a charge to support victims and survivors through donations at the 37-military hospital in Accra. He also led some foreign companies operating in Ghana such as Conserveria Africana and Sunda International to make donations to victims of fire and flood disasters. In collaboration with the member of parliament for Ayawaso West Wuagon Hon. Emmanuel Kyeremanteng Agyarko, Mensah donated household consumable products to students of the university of Ghana whose hostels were caught in a gas explosion.

In addition to supporting them, Herbert Mensah uses outdoor events such as mass keep-fit walks with survivors of disasters such as flood victims and gas explosion victims to raise awareness and remind Ghanaians of the need to avert future reoccurrence of such disasters.

Mensah also has established a tradition of donations and support for Zongo communities especially in his home region of Ashanti where he often does occasional donations of food and other consumable items for poor Muslim residents of Kumasi through the Chief Imam of the Kumasi Central Mosque.

=== COVID-19 Ambassador ===
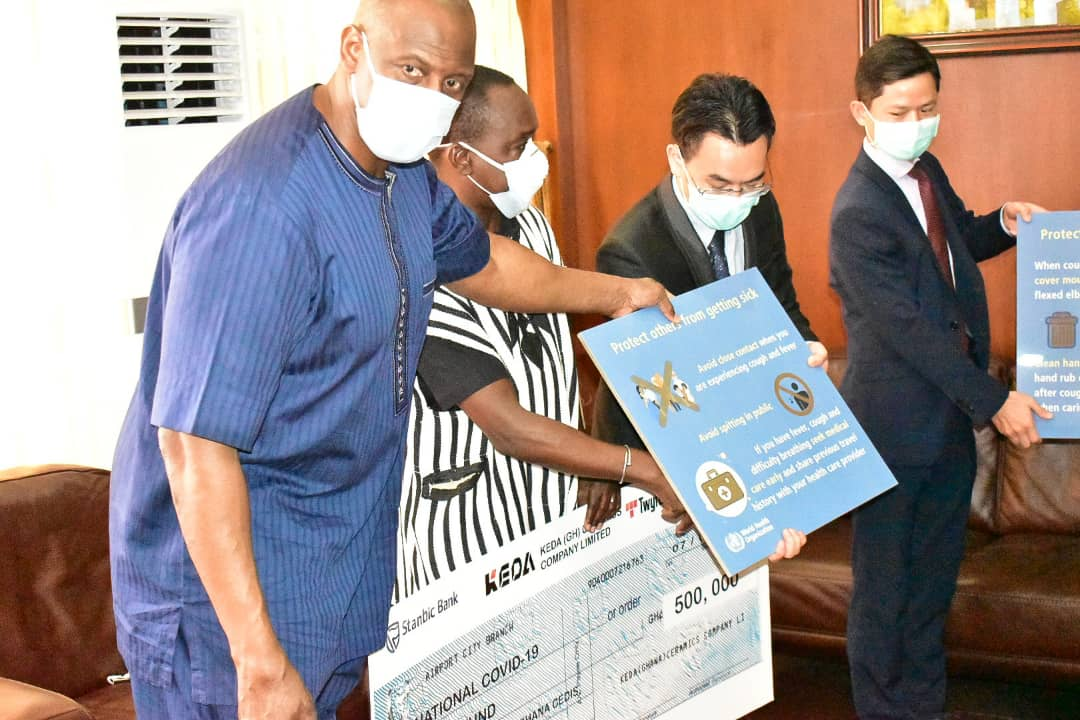
Herbert Mensah and others present a cheque to COVID-19 trust fund in Accra

As part of the fight against the COVID-19 global health pandemic in Ghana, Mr. Mensah created an advocacy campaign to encourage several private business people and companies in Ghana to contribute money and personal protective equipment to complement the government effort to support poor people and health workers during lockdown.

As the world continues to reel under a public health pandemic, many leaders have stepped up in their countries and communities to help fight the spread of COVID-19 through mass testing, public education on the effects of COVID-19 and advocacy for strict adherence to the social distancing protocols. As part of his role as a force for good during the long period of health crisis, Mensah in January 2021 organised mass testing for SARS-COV-2 PCR in Ghana as part of efforts to combat the spread of the disease among members of the Ghana rugby football union. He also engaged in mass public education to enhance social distancing during elections in Ghana in December 2020.

=== Human Rights Advocacy ===
Herbert Mensah has advocated for human rights of people accused of witchcraft in Ghana where superstition often leads to the mob killing or isolation of elderly women in the society. When a community mob gruesomely killed a 90 years old woman named Akua Denteh in July 2020 for suspected witchcraft, Mensah spoke out, calling on all Ghanaians to respect life and treat the elderly in the society with respect whiles asking families to take responsibility for their older relatives in the country and for the law to take its course. He also spoke out against brutalities and human rights abuses by authorities in Nigeria in 2020 during mass protests to #ENDSARS brutality in the country.
