= Nettey =

Surname list

Nettey is a Ghanaian surname. Notable people with the surname include:

- S. T. Nettey (1909–2007), Ghanaian politician
- Christopher Nettey (born 1998), Ghanaian footballer
- Jacob Nettey (born 1976), Ghanaian footballer
- Mansa Nettey, Ghanaian business and banking executive
- Emmanuel Nettey (born 1991), Ghanaian footballer
- Danny Nettey (1968–2016), Ghanaian musician and songwriter
- Christabel Nettey (born 1991), Canadian athlete
