= Abraham Ossei Aidooh =

Ghanaian politician

Hon. Abraham Ossei Aidooh

Member of the Ghana Parliament for Tema West
- In office 7 January 1997 – 6 January 2009
- Preceded by: Gladys Boateng
- Succeeded by: Irene Naa Torshie Addo

Minister for Parliamentary Affairs
- In office 2007–2009
- President: John Kufuor
- Preceded by: Felix Owusu-Adjapong

Member of parliament for the Tema West constituency
- In office 7 January 2001 – 6 January 2005
- President: John Kufuor

Personal details
- Born: 6 August 1953 (age 73)
- Party: New Patriotic Party
- Education: University of Ghana; Ghana School of Law
- Occupation: Lawyer

Abraham Ossei Aidooh is a Ghanaian politician from the New Patriotic Party. As of 2008, he is the Majority Leader in the Parliament of Ghana; previously he was Deputy Majority Leader. He is also a member of the Pan-African Parliament. He also is rapporteur of the Committee on Rules, Privileges and Discipline, one of the ten permanent committees of the Pan-African Parliament.

== Early life and education ==
Aidooh was born on 6 August 1953. He obtained his bachelor of law at the University of Ghana, School of Law. He is a Christian.

== Career ==
Aidooh is a legal practitioner by profession.

== Politics ==
Aidooh was a member of the 4th parliament of the 4th Republic and took seat during the 1996 Ghanaian general election for the New Patriotic Party. He was a member of the 2nd Parliament, 3rd parliament and 4th parliament of the 4th republic for Tema west Constituency.

== Elections ==
1996 Elections

Aidooh was elected as the member of parliament for the Tema West Constituency in the Greater Accra Region of Ghana as a member of the Second Parliament of the Fourth Republic of Ghana during the 1996 Ghanaian general elections. He was elected on the ticket of the New Patriotic Party with a total vote cast of 22,521 representing 46.50% of votes cast over his opponents Esther IIan-Agbodo Ogbogu of the National Democratic Congress who had 15,511 of votes which represents 32.00% of the total votes casts and George Alfred Ackah of the Convention People's Party who had no votes cast.

=== 2000 Elections ===
Aidooh was elected as the member of parliament for the Tema West constituency in the 2000 Ghanaian general elections. He was elected on the ticket of the New Patriotic Party. His constituency was a part of the 16 parliamentary seats out of 22 seats won by the New Patriotic Party in that election for the Brong Ahafo Region. The New Patriotic Party won a majority total of 100 parliamentary seats out of 200 seats in the 3rd parliament of the 4th republic of Ghana. He was elected with 25,647 votes out of 41,944 total valid votes cast. This was equivalent to 61.2% of the total valid votes cast. He was elected over M. Godfrey Nii Tackey of the National Democratic Congress, Justice E. K. Jones-Mensah of the Convention People's Party, Godfrey K. Binbey of the National Reform Party and Joyce Annan of the People's National Convention. These obtained 10,860, 2,887, 1,520 and 976votes respectively out of the total valid votes cast. These were equivalent to 25.9%, 6.9%, 3.6% and 2.3% respectively of total valid votes cast.

=== 2004 Elections ===
Aidooh was elected as the member of parliament for the Tema West constituency in the 4th parliament of the 4th republic of Ghana in the 2004 Ghanaian general elections. He was elected with 37,975votes out of 71,009 total valid votes cast. This was equivalent to 53.5% of the total valid votes cast. He was elected over George Komla Medie of the National Democratic Congress, Godfried Allan Lomotey of the Convention People's Party, Kojo Amoako of the Every Ghanaian Living Everywhere Party; and Kenneth Nana Amoateng, Ayele A.J. Avon and Justice Awortwe Edwards - all independent candidates. Aidooh was elected on the ticket of the New Patriotic Party. His constituency was a part of the 17 constituencies won by the New Patriotic Party in the Greater Accra region in that elections. In all, the New Patriotic Party won a total 128 parliamentary seats in the 4th parliament of the 4th republic of Ghana.

Parliament of Ghana
Preceded by Gladys Boateng	Member of Parliament for Tema West; 1997 – 2009	Succeeded by Irene Naa Torshie Addo
Preceded by Felix Owusu-Adjapong	Majority Leader; 2008 – 2009	Succeeded by Alban Bagbin
Political offices
Preceded by Felix Owusu-Adjapong	Minister for Parliamentary Affairs; 2007 – 2009	Succeeded by ?
