= Accra Sports Stadium disaster =

2001 stadium disaster in Ghana

Coordinates: 5°33′6″N 0°11′30″W

Accra Sport Stadium disaster
- Date: 9 May 2001
- Location: Accra, Ghana
- Cause: Police fired tear gas into the crowd, resulting in a stampede and crush
- Deaths: 126

A stampede occurred at the Ohene Djan Stadium in Accra, Ghana, on 9 May 2001. It killed 126 people, making it the worst stadium disaster to have ever taken place in Africa. It is also the second-deadliest disaster in the history of association football behind the Estadio Nacional disaster.

== Event ==
Ghana's two most successful football teams, Accra Hearts of Oak and Asante Kotoko, played a match at Hearts of Oak's home turf, the Accra Sports Stadium, on 9 May 2001. Anticipating crowd disturbances, authorities had implemented extra security measures—including stationing riot-control police officers at the stadium. Accra scored two late goals, and a referee called 2–1 Accra, resulting in some Kotoko fans throwing plastic seats and bottles onto the pitch.

Police present at scene responded by firing tear gas shells into the crowd. A panic and stampede ensued as fans tried to flee the irritant fumes. Many of the arena's gates had been locked and the stadium's compromised design left a bottleneck, with fewer exits than originally planned. The Ghana Institute of Architects called the stadium a "death trap". After the hour-long ordeal, it was found that 116 deaths resulted from compressive asphyxia and 10 fans died from trauma.

A fan, Abdul Mohammed, had passed out from the tear gas and was moved to a morgue, presumed dead. He regained consciousness after someone stepped on his foot, narrowly missing being buried alive.

Reports claim that medical staff had left the stadium before the tragedy ensued, as it took place near the end of the match. Some gates were locked, preventing escape.

In an interview with BBC News, the deputy Minister of Youth and Sports, Joe Aggrey, described the event as a devastating one with piles of bodies on the floors of the stadium.

== Aftermath ==
An official inquiry blamed police for over-reacting with reckless behaviour and indiscriminate firing of plastic bullets and tear gas. It also accused some officers of dishonesty and indefensible laxity. Six police officers were charged with 127 counts of manslaughter. The court ruled that the prosecution had failed to make a case and that the asphyxia may have been caused by the stampede and not the tear gas.

The commission of inquiry recommended improvements to stadium security and first aid facilities, and that nationwide rapid response teams should be set up.

Accra Sports Stadium was renovated in 2007 according to FIFA standards. Politics may have deferred the National Sports Council's attention to the stadium and it was again in disrepair 15 years after the disaster.

== Memorial ==
Following the event Ghana's president, John Agyekum Kufuor, called for three days of mourning. The Ghana Premier Football League suspended play for a month. Since 2001, corporations and philanthropists, including Herbert Mensah, who was Asante Kotoko chairman from 1999 to 2003, have memorialized this tragedy with the Stadium Disaster Fund and a series of events in Kumasi.

The events include paying respects to families of victims and their 148 children, their invitation to the Otumfuo's birthday at Manhyia Palace, prayers in the local Central Mosque, donations to the needy, the laying of a memorial wreath and a memorial march called the "May 9th Remembered Street Walk". In 2016, an annual memorial "May 9th Cup" football competition was created. Mensah has appealed to the government to memorialize that May 9. In 2017, the memorial events were themed "Embrace the Day".

A bronze statue was erected outside the stadium of a fan carrying another fan to safety with the inscription title "I Am My Brother's Keeper" in honor of the victims of the tragedy.

Fans who attend matches at the stadium now chant "Never Again! Never Again!" to remind themselves of the day.

== Similar events ==
- Heysel Stadium disaster
- Hillsborough disaster
- 2015 Accra explosion
- 2022 Kanjuruhan Stadium disaster
