= Kwame Governs Agbodza =

Ghanaian politician

The Honourable Kwame Governs Agbodza
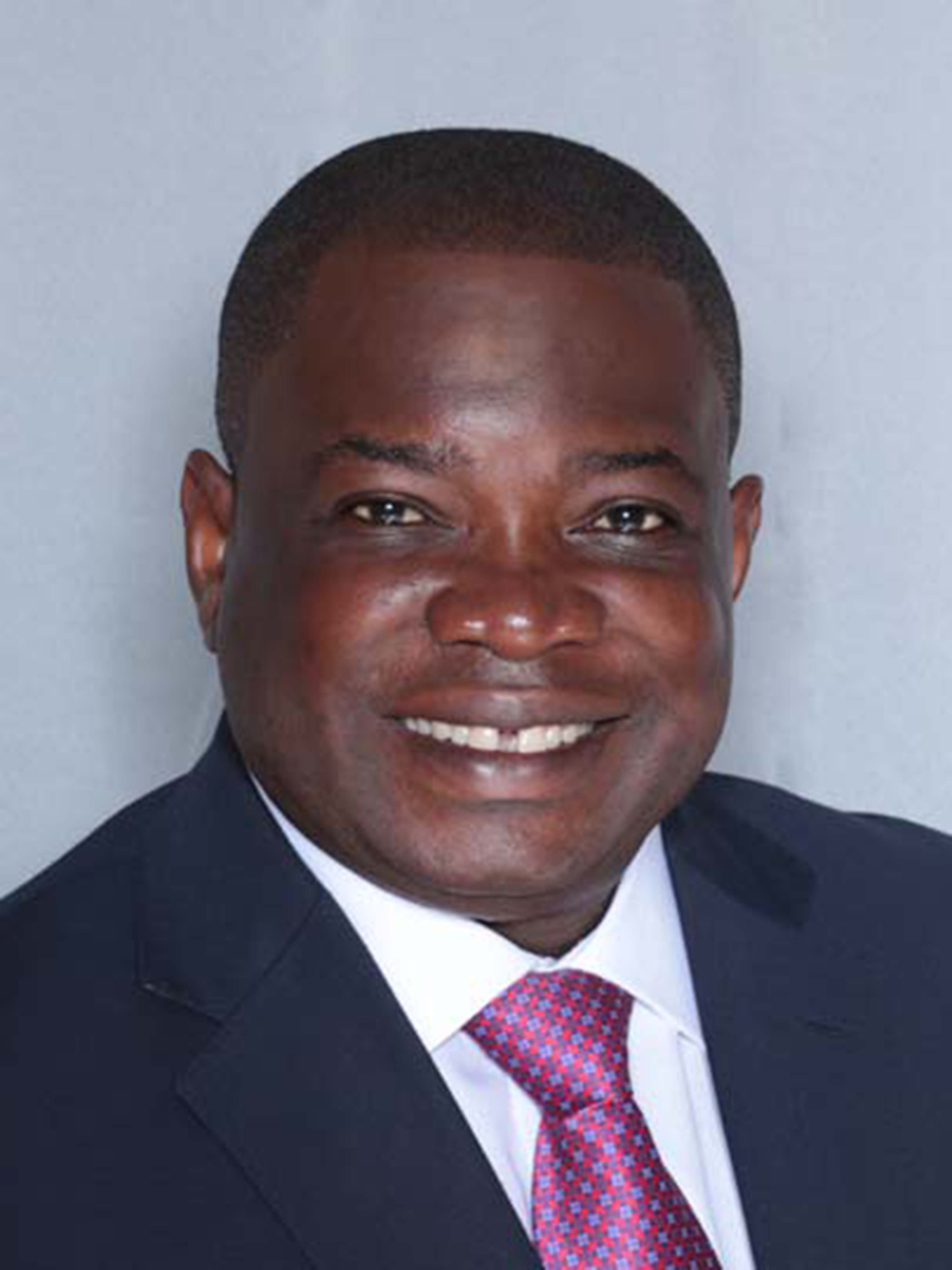

Member of the Ghana Parliament for Adaklu
- Incumbent
- Assumed office 7 January 2013
- Preceded by: New constituency

Minister for Roads and Highways
- Incumbent
- Assumed office February 2025
- Preceded by: Francis Asenso-Boakye

Personal details
- Born: 22 September 1973 (age 52)
- Party: National Democratic Congress

Kwame Governs Agbodza is a Ghanaian politician and member of the Seventh, eight and ninth Parliament of the Fourth Republic of Ghana representing the Adaklu Constituency in the Volta Region on the ticket of the National Democratic Congress. He served as the Chief Whip in the Parliament of Ghana and currently(since 2025) serves as the minister in charge of Ministry of Roads and Highways (Ghana). He served as the chartered architect and a member of the Ghana Institute of Architects and royal institute of British

== Early life and education ==
Agbodza was born on 22 September 1973 at Adaklu Kordiabe in the Volta region of Ghana. He proceeded to receive a postgraduate Diploma in Architecture at the University of Westminster, before obtaining his Diploma in Architecture from the University of East London. He then returned to Ghana to have his Bachelor of Science degree in Architecture at the Kwame Nkrumah University of Science and Technology. He holds certificates as a Chartered Architect from the Royal institute of British Architects and the Ghana institute of Architects.

== Career ==
Agbodza is managing director of Southworld Technical Services from 1999 to date, he is the Chief Executive Officer at Architects Co partners from 2010 to date and also chief executive officer at Kay and Partners from 2012 to date.

== Politics ==
He won the seat by 11,825 votes out of 13,440 valid cast votes which was equivalent to 87.98%. He was then elected by Parliament to join the Roads and transportation committee and members holding offices of profits committee.

=== 2024 Election ===
Mr. Kwame Governs Agbodza won the seat for Adaklu Constituency of the Volta Region in 2024 with a total of 13,636 votes which is 89.60% of the votes in the constituency and his opponent Bright Kwame Nyasitor of the New Patriotic Party (NPP) winning 10.40% which is 1,583 votes.

== Personal life ==
A Christian, he is married with two children.

Parliament of Ghana
New title	Member of Parliament for Adaklu; 2013–present	Incumbent
