= Joseph Ampomah Bosompem =

Ghanaian MP

Hon. Joseph Ampomah Bosompem

Member of Ghana Parliament for Akim Swedru Constituency
- In office 7 January 2008 – 6 January 2013
- Preceded by: Felix Owusu-Adjapong
- Succeeded by: Kennedy Osei Nyarko

Personal details
- Born: 29 June 1957 (age 69) Akim Swedru, Eastern Region Ghana
- Party: New Patriotic Party
- Children: 6
- Education: University of Manchester; Columbia University; University of Professional Studies; Strathclyde Business School
- Occupation: Politician
- Profession: Accountant

Joseph Ampomah Bosompem (born 29 June 1957) is a Ghanaian politician and a former member of Parliament for Akim Swedru Constituency in the Eastern Region of Ghana.

== Early life and education ==
Bosompem was born on 29 June 1957 in Akim Swedru in the Eastern Region of Ghana. He attended the Swedru Secondary School and the Ofori Panin Secondary School for his G.C.E Ordinary Level and graduated in 1979. He obtained a master's degree in Business Administration from the Manchester Business School of University of Manchester in 2004. He holds a certificate in Assets Management from the Columbia University in USA, which he obtained in 1994. Bosompem studied at Institute of Professional Studies and Self Tuition (IPS) for his ACCA in 1990. Prior to this, he studied in the university of Strathclyde Business School in UK and graduated with a Certificate in Public Finance Management Practice in Central and Local government in 1994.

== Career ==
Bosompem has been a freelance consultant for Integrated Intellect Limited since 2004. He worked as a lecturer and chief executive officer between 2006 and 2008. He also worked as the Deputy Commissioner of the Valued Added Tax (VAT) in Ghana. Prior to his work as a freelance consultant and lecturer, he worked at the Ministry of Finance and Economic Planning on the Government of Ghana Counterpart in the Public Expenditure and Dept Management Project. Other places of which Bosompem has worked include, Controller and Accountants General Department, and the University of Ghana as an Accounts Officer.

== Politics ==
Bosompem was first elected into parliament on the ticket of New Patriotic Party in 2008 as a member of Parliament for the Akim Swedru Constituency. He obtained 19,314 out of the 30,389 valid votes cast representing 63.6%. However, he was defeated in his party's parliamentary primaries in 2012.

== Personal life ==
Bosompem is married with six children. He is a Christian and a member of the Presbyterian church.
