= Paul Kofi Peprah =

Ghanaian politician

Member of Parliament for Akim Swedru
- In office 7 January 1993 – 6 January 1997
- Succeeded by: Felix Owusu-Adjapong

Personal details
- Born: 10 October 1936 (age 89)
- Party: National Democratic Congress
- Education: University of Ghana and University of Arizona
- Occupation: Business Consultant

Paul Kofi Peprah (born 10 October 1936) is a Ghanaian politician and member of the first parliament of the fourth republic of Ghana representing Akim Swedru constituency under the membership of the National Democratic Congress (NDC).

== Early life and education ==
Paul Kofi Peprah was born on 10 October 1936. He attended University of Ghana and University of Arizona where he obtained his Bachelor of Science and Master of Science in Agriculture and Agricultural Economic respectively. He worked as a Business Consultant before going into parliament.

== Politics ==
Peprah began his political career in 1992 when he became the parliamentary candidate for the National Democratic Congress (NDC) to represent his constituency in the Eastern Region of Ghana prior to the commencement of the 1992 Ghanaian parliamentary election.

He was sworn into the First Parliament of the Fourth Republic of Ghana on 7 January 1993, after being pronounced winner at the 1992 Ghanaian election held on 29 December 1992.

After serving his four years tenure in office, Paul lost his seat to his counterpart in the New Patriotic Party (NPP), Felix Owusu Adjapong. He defeated Baffour-Mensah Taki of the National Democratic Congress (NDC) who polled 12,348 votes representing 35.30% of the total valid votes cast, Yaw Appiah-Boateng of the National Convention Party (NCP) who polled 601 votes representing 1.70% of the total valid votes cast and Martin Kwaku Tandoh of the People's National Convention (PNC) who polled 576 votes representing 1.60% of the total votes cast at the 1996 Ghanaian general elections. Felix polled 15,824 votes which was equivalent to 45.30% of the total valid votes cast. He was thereafter elected on 7 January 1997.

== Personal life ==
Peprah is a Christian by faith.
