= Sports Writers Association of Ghana =

Association for Ghanaian sports journalists

- Abbreviation: SWAG
- Formation: 1968; 58 years ago
- Type: Professional society
- Region served: Ghana
- Official language: English
- President: Kwabena Yeboah
- Vice President: Maurice Quansah
- Key people: Joe Aggrey; Kwabena Yeboah
- Parent organization: International Sports Press Association (AIPS)
- Website: swagghana.com

The Sports Writers Association of Ghana (SWAG) is professional body in Ghana that includes as sports journalist, analysts, commentators and recognized sports associations in Ghana. The Association holds the SWAG night every year where the best sport Ghanaian sport personalities, clubs and cooperate institutions involved in sports development and promotion are honoured. The association was formed in 1968. In 2011, Asamoah Gyan won the sportsman of the year award, in recognition of his contribution to the Black Stars.

== Presidents ==
The following individuals have served as President of the Sport Writers Association of Ghana (SWAG);

President	Tenure of office
Joe Lartey	(1968–)
Joe Aggrey	(1985–2001)
Ebow Quansah	(2001–2015)
Kwabena Yeboah	(2015–president)
