= Adaklu (Ghana parliament constituency) =

Constituency in Ghana

- constituency for the Parliament of Ghana
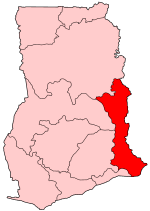
- District: Adaklu District
- Region: Volta Region of Ghana

Current constituency
- Created: 2012
- Party: National Democratic Congress
- MP: Kwame Governs Agbodza

Adaklu is one of the constituencies represented in the Parliament of Ghana. It elects one Member of Parliament (MP) by the first past the post system of election. Adaklu is located in the Adaklu district of the Volta Region of Ghana. It was created in 2012 by the Electoral Commission of Ghana prior to the Ghanaian general election.

== Members of Parliament ==
First elected	Member	Party
2012	Constituency created	
2012	Kwame Governs Agbodza	National Democratic Congress

The first ever election was held in December 2012 as part of the Ghanaian elections. The National Democratic Congress candidate won the seat with a 10,929 majority. Kwame Agbodza retained his seat in the 2016 elections.

== Elections ==
2024 Ghanaian general election: Adaklu
Party	Candidate	Votes	%	±%
NDC	Kwame Governs Agbodza	13,636	88.94	+3.39
NPP	Bright Kwame Nyatsikor	1,583	10.33	−4.12
NDP	Morti John Shadrack	112	0.73	—
Majority		12,053	78.61	+7.51
Turnout		15,457		
Registered electors				

2020 Ghanaian general election: Adaklu
Party	Candidate	Votes	%	±%
NDC	Kwame Governs Agbodza	13,117	85.55	−3.41
NPP	Raybon-Evans Anyadi	2,215	14.45	+5.43
Liberal Party of Ghana	Edward Agbovi	0	0.00	—
Majority		10,902	71.10	−8.84
Turnout		15,332	78.83	
Registered electors		19,448		

2016 Ghanaian general election: Adaklu
Party	Candidate	Votes	%	±%
NDC	Kwame Governs Agbodza	10,337	88.96	+0.98
NPP	Samuel C. K. Buame	1,048	9.02	2.35
NDP	Hiagbe Edem Dzanku	235	2.02	−3.33
Majority		9,289	79.94	−1.37
Turnout		11,620		—

2012 Ghanaian parliamentary election: Adaklu
Party	Candidate	Votes	%	±%
NDC	Kwame Governs Agbodza	11,825	87.98	—
NPP	Justice Jowawa Aklamanu	896	6.67	—
NDP	Hiagbe Edem Dzanku	719	5.35	—
Majority		10,929	81.31	—
Turnout		13,440		—

== See also ==
- List of Ghana Parliament constituencies
