= Felix Owusu-Adjapong =

Ghanaian politician (1944–2023)

Hon. Felix Owusu-Adjapong MP

Member of the Ghana Parliament for Akyem Swedru
- In office 7 January 1997 – 6 January 2009
- Preceded by: Paul Kofi Peprah
- Succeeded by: Joseph Ampomah Bosompem

Minister for Energy
- In office 2008–2009
- President: John Kufuor
- Preceded by: Joseph Kofi Adda
- Succeeded by: Joe Oteng-Adjei

Personal details
- Born: 13 February 1944 Akyem Swedru
- Died: 4 October 2023 (aged 79) Ghana
- Resting place: Akyem Swedru
- Party: New Patriotic Party
- Education: Kwame Nkrumah University of Science and Technology; Ghana School of Law
- Occupation: Politician

Felix Kwasi Owusu-Adjapong (13 February 1944 – 4 October 2023) was a Ghanaian politician who was a member of the Parliament of Ghana as a New Patriotic Party (NPP) representative for Akyem Swedru of the eastern region of Ghana. He also served as Minister for Energy.

== Early life and education ==
Felix Owusu-Adjapong studied Land Economy at the Kwame Nkrumah University of Science and Technology in Kumasi. He also studied Housing, Planning and Building at the Bouwcentrum Institute in Rotterdam, Urban Land Appraisal at the University of Reading in England, and law at the Ghana School of Law.

== Political career ==
Owusu-Adjapong was a member of the 2nd, 3rd and 4th Parliaments of the 4th republic of Ghana. He was first elected Member of Parliament for Akyem Swedru in the 1996 Ghanaian general elections with a total of 15,824 making 45.30% of the total valid votes cast that year. He was re-elected in the 2000 Ghanaian general elections with a majority of 14,614 making 56.80% of the votes cast. In February 2001 he was appointed Minister for Transport and Communications, and in April 2003 Minister of Parliamentary Affairs.

In the 2004 Ghanaian general elections, he was elected again as Member of Parliament with a majority vote of 21,048 making 66.94% of the total votes polled that year. In 2007 he resigned his ministerial position to make an unsuccessful bid for the presidential nomination of the NPP. He did not contest his parliamentary constituency at the 2008 Ghanaian General Elections, and Joseph Ampomah Bosompem won it for the NPP with a majority of 8,469. In June 2008 he was appointed Minister of Energy, holding the post until the end of Kufuor's government in January 2009.

== Death ==
Felix Owusu-Adjapong died on 4 October 2023, at the age of 79.

Parliament of Ghana
Preceded by Paul Kofi Peprah	Member of Parliament for Akyem Swedru; 1997–2009	Succeeded by Joseph Ampomah Bosompem
Preceded by ?	Majority Leader; 2005–2008	Succeeded by Abraham Ossei Aidooh
Political offices
Preceded by Edward Salia; Minister for Roads and Transport	Minister for Transport and Communications; 2001–2003	Succeeded by Richard Winfred Anane; Minister for Roads, Highways and Transport
Preceded by Ekwow Spio-Garbrah; Minister for Communications	Minister for Transport and Communications; 2001–2003	Succeeded by Albert Kan Dapaah; Minister for Communications and Technology
Preceded by ?	Minister for Parliamentary Affairs; 2003–2007	Succeeded by Abraham Ossei Aidooh
Preceded by Joseph Kofi Adda	Minister for Energy; 2008–2009	Succeeded by Joe Oteng-Adjei

== See also ==
- New Patriotic Party
- Kufuor government
