= Irene Naa Torshie Addo =

Ghanaian politician and lawyer

Hon. Irene Naa Torshie Addo
- In office 7 January 2009 – 6 January 2017
- Preceded by: New constituency
- Constituency: Tema West
- Majority: 4,545
- President: John Kufour
- President: John Atta Mills; John Mahama

Personal details
- Born: 30 September 1970 (age 55) Accra, Ghana
- Party: New Patriotic Party
- Children: 3
- Education: University of Warwick
- Profession: Lawyer

Irene Naa Torshie Addo (born 30 September 1970) is a Ghanaian politician and lawyer, former Deputy Minister of Foreign Affairs and a Member of Parliament for Tema West Constituency.

== Early life ==
Irene Naa Torshie Addo was born in Osu, Accra, on 30 September 1970.

== Education ==
She is a lawyer by profession and earned an LLM (Gender and Development Studies) from the University of Warwick in 1999.

Irene Naa Torshie Addo read law in the University of Ghana – Legon. She was called to the Ghana Bar in 1996.

== Career ==
As a member of the New Patriotic Party, she became a Member of the Ghana Parliament for Tema West during the 2008 elections and assumed office on 7 January 2009 to 6 January 2017 after losing the New Patriotic Party's primaries to Carlos Ahenkorah in 2015.

She was appointed the Deputy Ambassador to the Embassy of Ghana in Washington DC. in September 2006

Irene was appointed as the Administrator of the District Assemblies Common Fund (DACF) by President Nana Addo Dankwa Akufo-Addo.

== Personal life ==
Divorced with two children, she is a Christian who is a Baptist by denomination. She has two daughters in her first marriage: Samantha and Simone and a son named Stanely. The eldest Samantha Abigail Nana Adobea Addo. The second Simone Antonia Naa Adoley Addo and the youngest Stanely Walter Kwamena Adom Addo.

== See also ==
- MPs elected in the Ghanaian parliamentary election, 2008
- New Patriotic Party
