= Joe Aggrey =

Ghanaian journalist

Deputy Minister of Youth and Sports
- In office February 2001 – February 2005
- President: John Agyekum Kuffuor

Personal details
- Party: New Patriotic Party
- Occupation: Sports Journalist
- Profession: Journalist
- Awards: 1999 Ghana Journalists Association Journalist of the year

Joe Aggrey is a Ghanaian veteran journalist, writer and politician who served as the Deputy Minister of Youth and Sports from 2001 to 2005. In 1999 he emerged as the Ghana Journalists Association (GJA) Journalist of the year. From 1985 to 2001, he served as the president of the Sports Writers Association of Ghana. In 1999, he was adjudged the GIJ Journalist of the Year

== Career ==
=== Sports Journalism ===
Aggrey is a journalist who worked specifically as a sports journalist and writer. In 1999 he was awarded as the Ghana Journalists Association (GJA) Journalist of the year. He is a founding member of the Sport Writers Association of Ghana (SWAG) making him the first sports journalist to be crowned with that award. He rose through the ranks to become the General Secretary. He served as president of the SWAG from 1985 to 2001. In 2007, after Ghana's first appearance at the FIFA World Cup, the 2006 FIFA World Cup he along with top sports writers Ken Bediako, Ebo Quansah and Felix Abayateye put together a 120-page book titled "Pride and Glory - The story of the Black Stars in Germany 2006" to celebrate the countries success.

=== Politics ===
With his vast experience in the sporting industry, in February 2001, Aggrey was appointed as the Deputy Minister of Youth and Sports by President John Agyekum Kuffuor during his first tenure. He served in that role until 2005, when he was dropped and was not reappointed during second tenure. At the early stage of his tenure, in May 2001 the tragic Accra Sports Stadium disaster occurred, he was reported by BBC News as describing the event as ''a devastating one especially seeing a dead body of a young virile man on the floor at the stadium''.

== Honours ==
In 2020, during the 45th Annual SWAG Awards, he was decorated with the SWAG President's Award for his dedication to the course of SWAG and was elevated to the position of a Patron of the Association. In June 2021, he was also honoured during the Ghana Football Awards with Special Football Award along with Habiba Attah and J.E Sarpong for their contribution to Ghana Football over the years.
