= Akim Swedru (Ghana parliament constituency) =

Constituency in the Eastern Region of Ghana

- constituency for the Parliament of Ghana
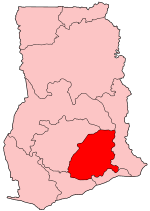
- District: Birim South District
- Region: Eastern Region of Ghana

Current constituency
- Party: New Patriotic Party
- MP: Kennedy Osei Nyarko

Akim Swedru is one of the constituencies represented in the Parliament of Ghana. It elects one Member of Parliament (MP) by the first past the post system of election.

== Boundaries ==
The Akim Swedru constituency is located within the Birim South District of the Eastern Region of Ghana. At the time of the 1965 Ghanaian parliamentary election, this area was represented by the Swedru-Achease constituency. During the 2nd and 3rd Republics, it was part of the Oda constituency. During the 4th Republic, Akim Swedru had its own constituency.

== Members of Parliament ==
First elected	Member	Party
1st Republic - Swedru-Achease
1965	Mary Winfred Koranteng	Convention People's Party
4th Republic - Akim Swedru
1992	Paul Kofi Peprah	National Democratic Congress
1996	Felix Kwasi Owusu-Adjapong	New Patriotic Party
2008	Joseph Ampomah Bosompem	New Patriotic Party
2012	Kennedy Osei Nyarko	New Patriotic Party

== Elections ==
2024 Ghanaian general election: Akim Swedru
Party	Candidate	Votes	%	±%
NPP	Kennedy Osei Nyarko	9,443	66.36	−4.93
NDC	Taaju Abdu Rahim	4,788	33.64	+4.93
Majority		4,655	32.72	−9.88
Turnout		14,444	—	—
Registered electors				

2020 Ghanaian general election: Akim Swedru
Party	Candidate	Votes	%	±%
NPP	Kennedy Osei Nyarko	11,180	71.29	+0.56
NDC	Taaju Abdu Rahim	4,503	28.71	+3.13
Majority		6,677	42.6	−2.55
Turnout			—	—
Registered electors		24,171		

2016 Ghanaian general election: Akim Swedru
Party	Candidate	Votes	%	±%
NPP	Kennedy Osei Nyarko	11,458	71.43	15.65
NDC	Robert Samuel Ansah	4,056	25.29	3.06
PPP	Obiri Ernest Amo	502	3.13	1.68
CPP	Anim Addo	25	0.16	—
Majority		7,402	45.15	11.60
Turnout		16,155	72.13	—
Registered electors		22,395		

2012 Ghanaian general election: Akim Swedru
Party	Candidate	Votes	%	±%
NPP	Kennedy Osei Nyarko	8,865	55.78	−7.82
NDC	Robert Samuel Ansah	3,533	22.23	−13.47
Independent	Joseph Ampomah Bosompem	3,217	20.24	—
PPP	Akwasi Amankwah Marfo	231	1.45	—
NDP	Godwin Boadi	48	0.30	—
Majority		5,332	33.55	5.65
Turnout		15,894	—	—
Registered electors		19,035		—

2008 Ghanaian parliamentary election: Akim Swedru
Party	Candidate	Votes	%	±%
NPP	Joseph Ampomah Bosompem	19,314	63.6	−3.8
NDC	Kwasi Akyem Apea-Kubi	10,845	35.7	4.7
CPP	Francis Williams Yaw Adu	230	0.2	−0.4
Majority		8,469	27.9	−8.5
Turnout		30,895	74.7	−13.2
Registered electors		41,356		

2004 Ghanaian parliamentary election: Akim Swedru
Party	Candidate	Votes	%	±%
NPP	Felix Kwasi Owusu-Adjapong	21,048	67.4	10.6
NDC	Baffour Mensah Takyi	9,667	31.0	−6.2
CPP	Edmond Tetteh-Okrah	173	0.6	−0.3
People's National Convention	Nana Appiah Boateng	171	0.5	0.1
Independent	Monica Appiah	158	0.5	—
Majority		11,381	36.4	16.8
Turnout		31,442	87.9	—
Registered electors		35,780		

2000 Ghanaian parliamentary election: Akim Swedru Source:Adam Carr's Election Archives
Party	Candidate	Votes	%	±%
New Patriotic Party	Felix Kwasi Owusu-Adjapong	14,614	56.8	2.9
National Democratic Congress	Kwasi Akyem Apea-Kubi	9,567	37.2	−4.9
Independent	Yaw Tweneboah	676	2.6	—
National Reform Party	Ofosu Manu Alex	495	1.9	—
Convention People's Party	Nana Braku Ntow-Anomah	240	0.9	—
People's National Convention	Yaw Appiah-Boateng	144	0.6	−1.4
Majority		5,047	19.6	0.4
Turnout		—	—	—

1996 Ghanaian parliamentary election: Akim Swedru Source:Electoral Commission of Ghana
Party	Candidate	Votes	%	±%
New Patriotic Party	Felix Kwasi Owusu-Adjapong	15,824	53.9	—
National Democratic Congress	Baffour-Mensah Taki	12,348	42.1	—
National Convention Party	Yaw Appiah-Boateng	601	2.0	—
People's National Convention	Martin Kwaku Tandoh	470	2.0	—
Majority		3,476	19.2	—
Turnout		29,889	85.5	59.9

1992 Ghanaian parliamentary election: Akim Swedru Source:Electoral Commission of Ghana
Party	Candidate	Votes	%	±%
National Democratic Congress	Paul Kofi Peprah			—
Majority				—
Turnout		7,868	25.6	—

== See also ==
- List of Ghana Parliament constituencies
- Birim South District
- Akim Swedru
