= Carlos Kingsley Ahenkorah =

Ghanaian politician

Hon. Carlos Ahenkorah MP
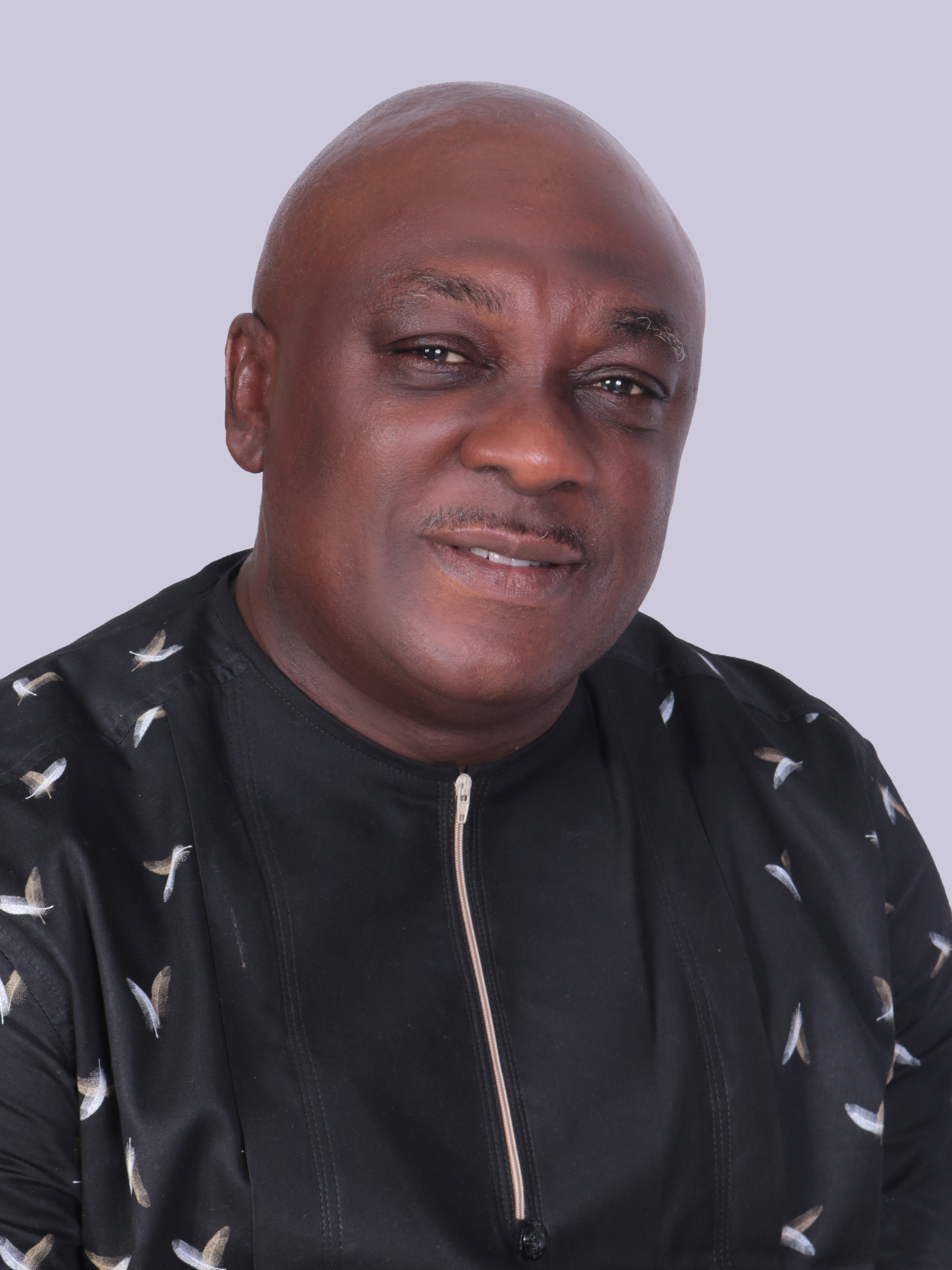

Member of the Ghana Parliament for Tema West constituency
- Incumbent
- Assumed office 7 January 2017

Deputy Minister for Trade and Industry
- In office March 2017 – July 2020
- President: Nana Akuffo-Addo

Personal details
- Born: Carlos Kingsley Ahenkorah; 20 July 1966 (age 60) Ghana
- Party: New Patriotic Party

Carlos Kingsley Ahenkorah is a Ghanaian politician and Member of Parliament of Tema West constituency. Also, he was a Deputy Minister for Trade and Industry in Ghana. He is also the CEO of Carlos King Freight Services.

== Education ==
Ahenkorah attended Tema Secondary School and Abuakwa State College. He obtained a Master of Arts (Ports and Shipping Administration) degree from the Regional Maritime University, Nungua-Accra and the University of Ghana Business School in 2013.

== Career ==
He worked at Jospong Consortium as a sales executive from 2004 to 2006. He was the marketing manager of Zoomlion Ghana Limited and the manager director of J. A. Plant Pool Limited between 2007 and 2012. He has been a lecturer at the Regional Maritime University since 2005 and lectured at Ghana Institute of Management and Public Administration (GIMPA) since 2010. He has been running Carlos King Freight Services since 1992.

== Politics ==
Ahenkorah is a member of the New Patriotic Party. He was the Member of Parliament for Tema West Constituency.

After serving two terms in Parliament in 2016 and 2020, he chose not to seek re-election for the Tema West seat, stepping aside to allow others to contest.

=== Committees ===
Ahenkorah was the Chairperson for the Trade, Industry and Tourism Committee; a member of the Privileges Committee and also a member of the Works and Housing Committee.

== Controversy ==
He was compelled to resign from his position as Minister of State after testing positive for COVID-19 and flouted health protocols and going out to interact with party supporters. In 2020, he went to a registration center whilst he was COVID-19 positive. This was at a time when he was to have been in self isolation. For this action pressure group Occupy Ghana demanded his expulsion from government. He was given an ultimatum by the president to tender his resignation. On the 3rd of July 2020, he resigned from office. In January 2021, during a national live telecast of the election of the Speaker of the Parliament of Ghana, Ahenkorah was seen snatching ballot sheets from the chamber during the voting process, before they were retrieved by security personnel and opposition lawmakers, as he bolted for the exit.

The Majority Leader of the eight parliament of Ghana, Osei Kyei-Mensah Bonsu denied speculations that he had instructed Carlos Ahenkorah to snatch ballot papers.
