= John Sefa Ayim =

Ghanaian academic

John Sefa Kwadwo Ayim

Vice Chancellor of the Kwame Nkrumah University of Science and Technology
- In office September 1999 – September 2002
- Preceded by: E. H. Amonoo-Neizer
- Succeeded by: Kwesi Akwansah Andam

Personal details
- Spouse: Grace Sefah Ayim
- Children: 3
- Education: University of London (Ph.D) 1973. Kwame Nkrumah University of Science and Technology (B.Pharm)
- Profession: Pharmacist, Professor

John Sefa Ayim is a Ghanaian academician and the former Vice Chancellor of the Kwame Nkrumah University of Science and Technology. He is the first Alumnus of Kwame Nkrumah University of Science and Technology to become a Vice Chancellor. He was the Dean of the Faculty of Pharmacy (1996 to 1999), Head of the Department of Pharmaceutical Chemistry, of the Kwame Nkrumah University of Science and Technology.

== Term as Vice Chancellor ==
Ayim served as Vice Chancellor of KNUST from 1999 to 2002.
