= Kwabena Yeboah =

Ghanaian sports journalist (born c. 1967)

- Born: c. 1967 (age 58–59); Apam, Central Region of Ghana
- Education: Ghana Institute of Journalism
- Occupation: Sports journalist
- Years active: 1996–present
- Known for: Hosting sports talk shows, weekly sports reviews and live commentary on GTV
- Television: GTV sports

Kwabena Yeboah (born c. 1967 at Apam in the Central Region of Ghana), is a Ghanaian veteran sports journalist, writer and commentator. He is known for hosting sports talk shows, weekly sports reviews and live commentary on GTV. The expression Oluwaa is attributed to Kwabena for his reaction to goals during commentaries.

== Education and early life ==
Kwabena Yeboah began his early education at several institutions, including Apam Methodist Primary, Akosombo Experimental School, Nkawkaw Presbyterian School, and Komenda Local Authority. He continued his education at Winneba Secondary School, where he studied for seven years. Yeboah later attended the Ghana Institute of Journalism (GIJ) from 1982 to 1984, where he pursued studies in journalism and communication.

== Career ==
Kwabena has hosted popular show Sports Highlights on GTV since 21 February 1994. He served as the Vice President of the Sports Writers Association of Ghana (SWAG) and was elevated to the role of President in 2015 after he won the elections. In 2019, he was reelected and given the nod for a second tenure of four years. He was also appointed as board member of Ghana Airports Company.
