= E. Bamfo-Kwakye =

Vice Chancellor of the Kwame Nkrumah University of Science and Technology

Bamfo-Kwakye

Vice Chancellor of the Kwame Nkrumah University of Science and Technology
- In office 1974–1983
- Preceded by: Emmanuel Evans-Anfom
- Succeeded by: F. O. Kwami

Personal details
- Profession: Academic

E. Bamfo-Kwakye is a Ghanaian academic and a former Vice-Chancellor of the Kwame Nkrumah University of Science and Technology (KNUST).

== Term as Vice-Chancellor ==
Bamfo-Kwakye served as Vice-Chancellor of KNUST from 1974 to 1983.
