= Tema West =

Constituency in Ghana

- constituency for the Parliament of Ghana
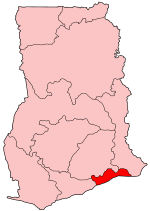
- District: Tema Municipal District
- Region: Greater Accra Region of Ghana

Current constituency
- Party: National Democratic Congress
- MP: James Enu

Tema West is a constituencies represented in the Parliament of Ghana. It elects one member of parliament by the first past the post system of election. Tema West is located in the Tema Municipal District of the Greater Accra Region of Ghana.

== Boundaries ==
The constituency is located within the Accra Metropolis District of the Greater Accra Region of Ghana.

== Members of parliament ==
Election	Member	Party
1992	Gladys Boateng	National Democratic Congress
1996	Abraham Ossei-Aidooh	New Patriotic Party
2008	Irene Naa Torshie Addo	New Patriotic Party
2016	Carlos Kingsley Ahenkorah	NPP
2020	Carlos Kingsley Ahenkorah	NPP
2024	James Enu	National Democratic Congress

== Elections ==
MPs elected in the Ghanaian parliamentary election, 2008:Tema West Source: Ghana Home Page
Party	Candidate	Votes	%	±%
New Patriotic Party	Irene Naa Torshie Addo	39,076	55.1	—
National Democratic Congress	George K. Medie	30,434	42.9	—
Convention People's Party	Isaac Kofi Asempa	1,382	1.9	—
Majority		8,642	12.2	—
Turnout		—	—	—

2016 Ghanaian general election: Tema West
Party	Candidates	Votes	%
NPP	Kingsley Carlos Ahenkorah	44,579	59.52
NDC	James Enu	29,742	39.71
PPP	Marshall Dogbatsey	404	0.54
CPP	Peterkin Kwame Kin-Adano	99	0.13
NDP	Awotwe Kweku	78	0.10

== See also ==
- List of Ghana Parliament constituencies
