= F. O. Kwami =

Former Vice Chancellor of the Kwame Nkrumah University of Science and Technology

Vice Chancellor of the Kwame Nkrumah University of Science and Technology
- In office September 1984 – September 1992
- Preceded by: E. Bamfo-Kwakye
- Succeeded by: E. H. Amonoo-Neizer

Personal details
- Education: Kwame Nkrumah University of Science and Technology
- Profession: Academic

Prof. F. O. Kwami Ph.D. was a Ghanaian academic and a former Vice Chancellor of the Kwame Nkrumah University of Science and Technology.

== Term as Vice Chancellor ==
F. O. Kwami served as Vice Chancellor of KNUST from 1984 to 1992.
