= Owusu Ampomah =

Ghanaian footballer

Personal information
- Date of birth: 6 February 1985 (age 41)
- Place of birth: Accra, Ghana
- Height: 1.74 m (5 ft 9 in)
- Position: Striker

Youth career
- 2000–2003: Kumasi Envoys
- 2004–2005: King Faisal Babes
- 2005–2008: SC Freiburg

Senior career*
Years	Team	Apps	(Gls)
2006–2008	SC Freiburg	7	(1)
2006–2008	SC Freiburg II	45	(16)
2008	RedBull South Africa	7	(1)
2008–2009	Liberty Professionals		
2009–2012	Cornerstones		
- * Club domestic league appearances and goals

Owusu Ampomah (born 6 February 1985) is a Ghanaian former professional footballer who played as a striker.

== Career ==
Ampomah was born in Accra. He played for Cornerstones, Liberty Professionals F.C., RedBull South Africa, Kumasi Envoys, King Faisal Babes and German club SC Freiburg.
