= Kankam Twum Barima =

Ghanaian educationist

Minister for Food and Agriculture
- In office 1969 – September 1969
- Appointed by: Akwasi Afrifa
- Preceded by: Albert Adomakoh
- Succeeded by: Kwame Safo-Adu

Personal details
- Born: 28 December 1918 Abomosu, Gold Coast
- Died: 1998
- Education: Achimota College
- Alma mater: Trinity College, Cambridge; Imperial College of Tropical Agriculture

Kankam Twum Barima (28 December 1918 – 1998) was a Ghanaian academic and government official who was Commissioner for Agriculture in the administration of the National Liberation Council in 1969.

== Early life and education ==
Barima was born on 28 December 1918 at Abomosu in the Eastern region of Ghana to Opanyin Kwadwo and Sophia Aboraa all of Abuakwa. He had his early education at Achimota College now Achimota School. He furthered his education at Trinity College, Cambridge where he gained his Bachelor of Arts in agriculture in 1946 and the Imperial College of Agriculture, Trinidad, from 1948 to 1949. He obtained his Master of Arts in 1952 from the University of Cambridge.

== Career and politics ==
In 1949, he joined the Colonial Agricultural Service. Later he was appointed lecturer of Agricultural Economics of the university college of the Gold Coast now University of Ghana where he taught from 1951 to 1955. From 1955 to 1966, he became a professor of agriculture, Dean of the Faculty of Agriculture, Pro-Vice chancellor and Acting Vice-chancellor of the University of Science and Technology, Kumasi now the Kwame Nkrumah University of Science and Technology. He left the university in December 1967, returned to his home town Kyebi in the Eastern region of Ghana and went into farming.

In 1969 Barima was appointed Ghana's Commissioner (Minister) for Agriculture. He worked on various boards both home and abroad. From 1970 to 1976, he was Ghana's representative on the executive board of United Nations Educational, Scientific and Cultural Organization UNESCO in Paris, and the vice president of the executive board (1974–1976). He was appointed director of the Institute of Statistical, Social and Economic Research (ISSER) at the University of Ghana, in 1972. Barima retired from the University of Ghana in 1983. He was the second president of the executive committee of Council for the Development of Social Science Research in Africa CODESRIA from 1976 to 1979.

In 1959 he was elected a foundation fellow of the Ghana Academy of learning now Ghana Academy of Arts and Sciences, he served as a member of the board of governors and chairman of its research committee. In 1963, He was a member of an International mission to advice on the development of a national plan of education of Malawi and he was in charge of the technical and agricultural aspects of the national plan as drawn up by the team which was sponsored by the British Overseas Ministry and USAID. He was a consultant to UNESCO in Agricultural Science and education in 1965; and in 1967 to FAO in Rome, on Rural Sociological Problems of Agricultural development.

== Literature ==
Barima published books and articles which include;

- The Cultural Basis of Our National Development, (1980)
- The Genesis of Integrated Rural Development, (1978)
- Development of Agricultural Education, (1977)
- Education for Development: Reflections on a Natural Resources Development Approach to Educational Organisation in Developing Countries, (1976)
- Research to Development

== Death ==
Barima died in 1998.
