= Victor Asare Bampoe =

Ghanaian physician and public health specialist

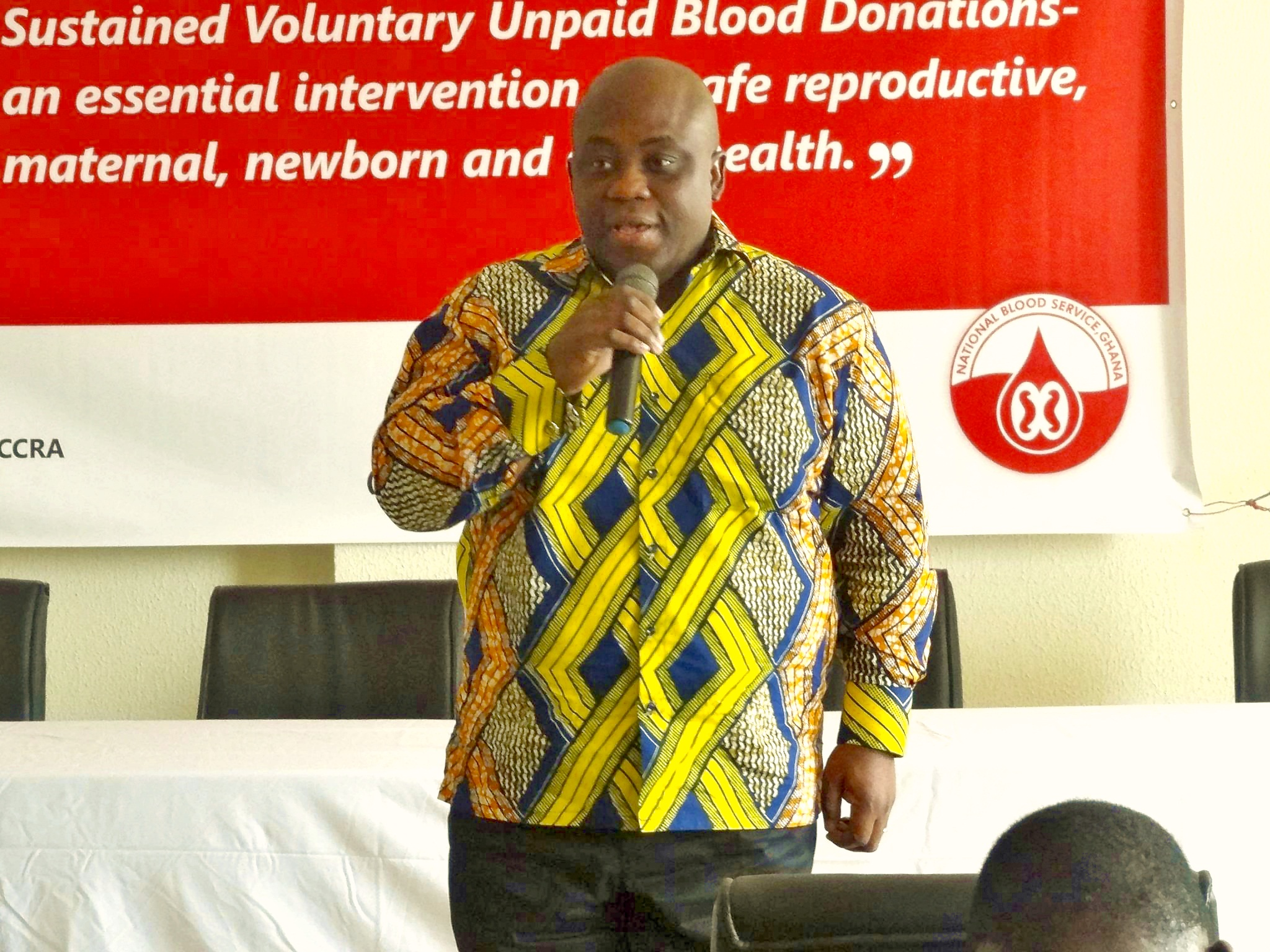
Victor Asare Bampoe

Victor Asare Bampoe is a Ghanaian physician, public health specialist and a former deputy Minister of Health.

== Early life and education ==
Bampoe was born in 1967. He had his secondary school education, both GCE Ordinary and Advanced Level certificate in Achimota School in Ghana from 1979 to 1986. He proceeded to the University of Ghana Medical School where he graduated with a BSc in human biology, medicine and surgery in 1995 and was trained as a medical doctor. Afterwards he completed post-graduate study for a Master of Public Health at the Johns Hopkins School of Hygiene and Public Health of Johns Hopkins University in Baltimore, Maryland, US, in 1999.

== Career ==
Bampoe served as the senior fund portfolio manager at the Global Fund to Fight AIDS, Tuberculosis and Malaria based in Geneva, Switzerland.

== Politics ==
In June 2014, Bampoe was nominated by President John Dramani Mahama to serve as the deputy Minister of Health. He was vetted on 10 July 2014 and sworn in on 22 July 2014. He served in that role from 2014 to 2017.

Bampoe was appointed by President John Dramani Mahama as the CEO of the National Health Insurance Authority (NHIA) of Ghana in February 2025
