= Kennedy Osei Nyarko =

Ghanaian politician

Hon Kennedy Osei Nyarko
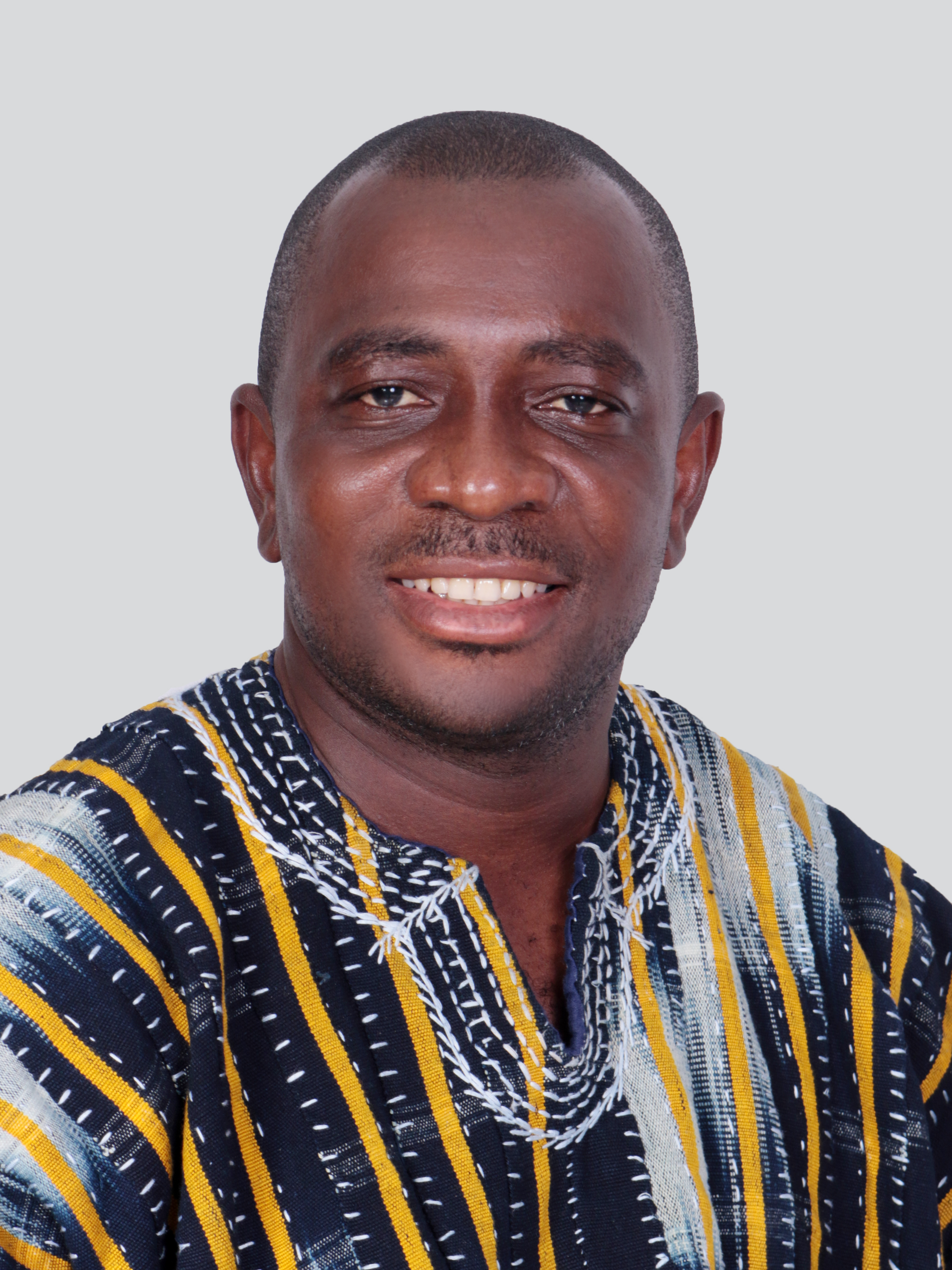

Member of the Ghana Parliament for Akim Swedru
- Incumbent
- Assumed office 7 January 2013

Deputy Minister for Agriculture
- Incumbent
- Assumed office November 2017
- Preceded by: William Quaitoo

Personal details
- Born: Kennedy Osei Nyarko; 2 October 1979 (age 47) Akim Swedru
- Party: New Patriotic Party
- Education: Ghana Institute of Management and Public Administration, Chartered Institute of Marketing, University of Ghana
- Occupation: Politician
- Profession: Marketer
- Committees: Roads and Transport Committee (Chairperson), Special Budget Committee, Public Accounts Committee

Kennedy Osei Nyarko (born 2 October 1979 in Eastern Region, Ghana) is a Ghanaian politician. He was elected member of parliament in 2016 representing Akim Swedru. In November 2017, he was appointed Deputy Minister of Agriculture in the Republic of Ghana.

== Early life and education ==
Kennedy was born on 2 October 1979 and hails from Akim Swedru in the Eastern Region of Ghana. He attended the Ghana Institute of Management and Public Administration where he obtained a bachelor's degree in Marketing in 2010. After his first degree, he attended Chartered Institute of Marketing in UK where he graduated with a Postgraduate Diploma in Marketing in 2011. In 2012, he finished a postgraduate degree in marketing from the University of Ghana. He further had his Master of Science degree in Climate Change and Sustainable Development in 2019 from the University of Ghana.

== Career ==
Before starting his political career, Kennedy was a technical sales manager at J.A Plant Pool, a Ghanaian mining company for three years and the General manager for the company's Northern zone. He was the Head of sales/Marketing at Jospong Group of Companies. He was also the Head of Marketing at Zoomlion Ghana Limited. He has a radio station called Bosome FM.

== Politics ==
Kennedy is a member of the New Patriotic Party and currently the Member of Parliament for Akim Swedru Constituency in the Eastern Region of Ghana.

In 2012, he ran for Member of Parliament Ghana and won with a total of 7143 votes. He was elected into office that same year. In 2017, due to the resignation of former Deputy Agriculture Minister William Quaitoo he was appointed Deputy Minister of Agriculture by Nana Akufo-Addo.

=== 2012 election ===
In the 2012 Ghanaian general election, he won the Akim Swedru Constituency parliamentary seat with 8,865 votes making 55.78% of the total votes cast whilst the NDC parliamentary candidate Robert Samuel Ansah had 3,533 votes making 22.23% of the total votes cast, the PPP parliamentary candidate Akwasi Amankwah Marfo had 231 votes making 1.45% of the total votes cast, an Independent parliamentary candidate Joseph Ampomah Bosompem had 3,217 votes making 20.24% of the total votes cast and the NDP parliamentary candidate Godwin Boadi had 48 votes making 0.30% of the total votes cast.

=== 2016 election ===
In the 2016 Ghanaian general election, he again won the Akim Swedru Constituency parliamentary seat with 11,458 votes making 71.4% of the total votes cast whilst the NDC parliamentary candidate Robert Samuel Ansah had 4,056 votes making 25.3% of the total votes cast, the PPP parliamentary candidate Obiri Ernest Amo had 502 votes making 3.1% of the total votes cast, and the CPP parliamentary candidate Anim Addo had 25 votes making 0.2% of the total votes cast.

=== 2020 election ===
In the 2020 Ghanaian general election, he again won the Akim Swedru Constituency parliamentary seat with 11,180 votes making 71.3% of the total votes cast whilst the NDC parliamentary candidate Taaju Abdu Rahim had 4,503 votes making 28.7% of the total votes cast.

=== Committees ===
In 2017, he was the Chairman of the Committee of Local Government in Parliament of Ghana.

Kennedy is the Chairperson of the Roads and Transport Committee, a member of the Special Budget Committee, and also a member of the Public Accounts Committee.

== Personal life ==
Kennedy is a Christian.

== Philanthropy ==
In October 2022, he established a Teacher's Award Scheme to motivate tutors in the Akim Swedru Constituency.
