= E. H. Amonoo-Neizer =

Vice Chancellor of the Kwame Nkrumah University of Science and Technology

Eugene Hammond Amonoo-Neizer

Vice Chancellor of the Kwame Nkrumah University of Science and Technology
- In office 1992–1997
- Preceded by: F. O. Kwami
- Succeeded by: John Sefa Ayim

Personal details
- Education: [Achimota School] University of London

E. H. Amonoo-Neizer is a Ghanaian academic and a former Vice Chancellor of the Kwame Nkrumah University of Science and Technology (KNUST).

== Term as Vice Chancellor ==
Amonoo-Neizer served as Vice Chancellor of KNUST from 1992 to 1997.
