= Kofi Martin Ampomah =

Captain Kofi Martin Ampomah (1 January 1933 – 8 July 2011) in Brakwa, in the Central Region of Ghana, the then Gold Coast was a retired Ghanaian airline pilot who was head of the Ghana Civil Aviation Authority.

He attended Achimota College, one of the most prestigious boarding schools in Ghana, and then Sherborne School. On graduation he undertook training to become one of Ghana's first airline pilots.

From Ghana Airways, he moved to Malaysia Airlines, where he finished his career. On returning to his farm in Ghana he was appointed as an advisor for the Civil Aviation Authority before rising to his current position. He died of a heart attack on 8 July 2011 aged 78.
