= Mansa Nettey =

Ghanaian banking executive

- Occupation: Chief Executive Officer
- Years active: 19
- Known for: Banking Executive

Mansa Nettey is a Ghanaian banking executive. She is the first ever female chief executive officer appointed by the Standard Chartered Ghana.

She took over as chief executive from Mr. Kweku Bedu-Addo in 2017 when he took a new role outside Ghana. The release quoted Bola Adesola as saying that: "I am delighted to welcome Mansa as the first female CEO for Standard Chartered Bank in Ghana. Her breadth of knowledge and deep insights of the market will further drive the growth of the Ghana business". As part of her work, She reported directly to Bola Adesola CEO, Nigeria and West Africa.

She had her secondary school education at Achimota School before enrolling for an undergraduate degree at the Kwame Nkrumah University of Science and Technology where she came out as a pharmacist and her master's degree at the Manchester Business School

Nettey has over 20 years experience in the banking sector and she has held various senior roles in corporate and institutional banking. She is on the board of directors at Standard Chartered Bank Nigeria Limited and on the Standard Chartered Bank Ghana Limited board as an executive director. She is the founder of the Leukemia Project Foundation in Ghana. It was set up after she battled with leukemia for some years.

== Education ==
Mansa Nettey is an alumna of Achimota School and Kwame Nkrumah University of Science and Technology where she graduated with a first degree in Pharmacy in 1995. In 1998, she received her MBA from the Manchester Business School.

== Career ==
She started her banking career as the relationship manager of Standard Chartered Bank. She was the former head of foreign exchange sales in Ghana and across West Africa She was also the head of the financial markets in Ghana She is the executive director of the board of Standard Chartered Bank of Ghana and a non-executive director of the board of Standard Chartered Bank of Nigeria. In 2017, she was appointed the chief executive officer of Standard Chartered Bank, and that is her current role. She also became president of the Ghana Association of Banks.

== Awards and achievement ==
Nettey led a sales team in developing the financial market in Ghana After battling with leukemia for some years, Mansa Nettey founded the Leukemia Project Foundation in Ghana.

She was recognized as one of the top 100 women CEOs in Africa promoting the UN SDG goals in 2019. Mrs. Nettey was crowned as the 2024 CIMG Marketing Woman of the Year at the 36th Chartered Institute of Marketing, Ghana (CIMG) National Marketing Performance Awards.

== Personal life ==
Mrs. Nettey is married with a daughter.
