= Ghana International School =

Location
- 19 Second Circular Road trip Cantonments; Accra, Greater Accra; Ghana; 5.580352°N 0.176446°W

Information
- School type: Private Day school
- Motto: Understanding of Each Other
- Established: 1 September 1955; 71 years ago
- Founder: Mrs. Kathleen Lines
- School board: Board of Governors
- School district: Accra Metropolis
- Oversight: Ghana Education Service
- Authorizer: Ministry of Education
- Principal: Mr. Frank Amponsah-Mensah
- Grades: Nursery - Upper Sixth
- Gender: Co-ed (Boys/Girls)
- Age: 3 to 17
- Education system: British
- Campus: Cantonments
- Houses: 6
- Colours: Green and white
- Song: Understanding of Each Other
- Nickname: GIS
- Team name: Leopards
- Accreditation: Council of International Schools
- Address Second Circular Road: P. O. Box GP 2856 Cantonments. Accra, Greater Accra, Ghana
- Website: www.gis.edu.gh

Ghana International School is a coeducational international school located at Cantonments, Accra, Ghana. Ghana International School has an enrollment of diverse backgrounds. The student population derives from many countries and cultural orientations.

== History ==
It was established in 1955.

== Legal structure ==
Ghana International School is a company limited by guarantee.

== Academics ==
GIS uses international curriculum and their students sit for international examinations like. IGCSE GCE O-Level and GCE A-level. It is a day only mixed educational facility in Ghana delivering English National Curriculum. GIS is accredited by the Council of International Schools and the New England Association of Schools and Colleges. The school operates four departments – an infant, junior and lower/upper secondary schools. It has 20 different academic subjects. GIS accepts enrollment from ages 3 to 13. Students in the Upper Secondary School adopt the Cambridge International Examinations' IGCSE and GCE A-level curricula.

== Administration ==
It is governed by a Board of Directors. The Board draws membership from general industry experts from the public and private sectors. Academic affairs are overseen by a Principal who is assisted in management by an eight-member team and in curriculum instruction by a corps of tutors.

== Facilities ==
Facilities include a language laboratory, a film studio, electronic boards for teaching and several science laboratories.

== Extracurricular activities ==
Major events for the school include UN Day to celebrate the diversity; cultural activities of drumming, dancing, folklore; a 40-year traditional 13 km sponsored walk by the PTA; an art week portraying student creativity; a musical show that features top performers and a Science/Maths/ICT Fair that is held every two years to inspire research and scholastic excellence. The school is also a member of the International School Sports Association of Ghana and has participated in numerous sports competitions for football, basketball, hockey and more.

== GIS alumni ==
The school has an alumni association called Ghana International School Alumni (GISA). The Alumni provides regular counselling and mentorship sessions for the students, These sessions are usually held during the temporary subject, counselling.
