= Ghana Institute of Architects =

Professional society in Ghana

- Abbreviation: GIA
- Predecessor: Gold Coast Society of Architects
- Formation: 1962; 64 years ago
- Type: Professional society
- Purpose: Advancement of architectural education, practice and accreditation
- Location: ARB Apex Bank Building, Ridge, Accra
- Region served: Ghana
- Official language: English
- Website: GIA

The Ghana Institute of Architects (GIA) is a professional society for architects and built environment affiliates located in Accra, Ghana. The first professional body in independent Ghana, it was registered in 1962 and inaugurated in December 1964 as a self-governing and fully indigenous institution to advance the architectural practice, education and accreditation in the country. The Institute is the successor to the pre-independence Gold Coast Society of Architects, a colonial social club for Gold Coast-based architects founded in August 1954. The first president of the Ghana Institute of Architects was Theodore Shealtiel Clerk (1909–1965), the first formally trained, professionally certified Ghanaian architect and an award-winning urban planner who designed, planned and developed the harbour city of Tema.

== Institutional history ==
In 1963, approximately fifteen pioneer Ghanaian architects who had trained in the United Kingdom and the United States met to officially plan and formalise the architectural practice, education and accreditation through a professional institution, the Ghana Institute of Architects (GIA) as the successor to Gold Coast Society of Architects (GCSA), a social club for Gold Coast-based architects founded between July and August 1954 during the British colonial era. These architects included T. S. Clerk, D. K. Dawson, J. S. K. Frimpong, P. N. K., Turkson, J. Owusu-Addo, O. T. Agyeman, A. K. Amartey, E. K. Asuako, W. S. Asamoah, M. Adu-Donkor, K. G. Kyei, C. Togobo, V. Adegbite, M. Adu-Badu and E. Kingsley Osei. T. S. Clerk was appointed the sole architect at that meeting to draft the first constitution of the Institute. He subsequently submitted his proposals and the constitutional draft and its by-laws he authored were discussed, approved and adopted.

The founding members of the erstwhile GCSA were mostly British expatriate architects who were employees of the colonial civil service and attached to the Public Works Department (P.W.D.). This group consisted of G. S. Knight (President), Arthur Lindsay (Honorary Secretary), B. A. W Trevallion, (Honorary Treasurer), Kenneth M. Scott (Hon. Public Relations Officer), E.W Williamson, A. Williamson, Max Garlach, G. C. Harris, A.K Sulton, M. R. Griffiths, K. Wood, H. J. Pine, G.P Smith and L.P Williams. The GCSA meetings were held at the International Club located on the Knutsford Avenue in Accra. Concurrently, a pre-independence indigenous architectural association, the Space Club was set up by other Western-trained Ghanaian professionals. This crop of early Ghanaian architects also doubled as external examiners and guest lecturers at the Department of Architecture at the Kwame Nkrumah University of Science and Technology (KNUST) in Kumasi. In modern times, in addition to KNUST, GIA professionals are also involved with professional development programmes at the architecture school at Central University (Ghana).

=== Inauguration ===
The Institute's official inaugural ceremony was on Friday 11 December 1964 at 20:30 GMT at the Commonwealth Hall of the University of Ghana, Legon. The first executives were inducted during the event with Theodore S. Clerk being elected the first president of the Ghana Institute of Architects, after which he gave his acceptance speech. Earlier, T. S. Clerk had been the president of the Gold Coast Society of Architects. Other first officers of the Institute elected include P.N.K. Turkson, (Vice-President), Victor Adegbite (Honorary Treasurer), O.T. Agyeman (Honorary Secretary), J.S.K Frimpong, John Owusu-Addo, W.S. Asamoah, E.K. Asuako, A.K. Amartey and M. Adu-Donkor as Members. E.K. Bensah, the then Minister of Works and Housing was the Chairman of the inaugural event, assisted by Nana Kobina Nketia IV, Director, Institute of Art and Culture, R.P. Baffour, Vice-Chancellor, KNUST and G.Y. Odoi, Managing Director, Ghana National Construction Corporation. The first Fellowships of the GIA were conferred on E.K. Bensah, R.P Baffour, L. K. Apaloo and G.Y. Odoi. The Ghana Police Band provided music for the occasion.

== Governance and charter ==
The GIA has the backing of the Government of Ghana, through the edict, Architects Decree, NLCD 357, of 1969. The Ghana Institute of Architects is a member of the African Union of Architects, Commonwealth Association of Architects and the International Union of Architects. The Institute holds Annual General Meetings (AGM) to elect its executives who form the Institute's Council. The members of the Council also belong to the Ghana Chamber of Construction Industry, the regulator of Ghanaian construction industry in Ghana. The Ghana Institute of Architects Membership Charter states:

No person shall practice in Ghana as an architect unless he is properly registered with the Ghana Institute of Architects to practice as such.

Membership of the Institute shall be opened to all qualified Architects practicing in Ghana as individuals, or within unincorporated groups and corporate bodies.

== Development Context ==
=== Colonial period ===
The founding of the colonial architectural society, the Gold Coast Society of Architects had ties to the establishment of the School of Architecture, Building Technology and Planning at the KNUST in 1952 when a feasibility team made up of British, German and American architects and academics arrived in the country. The committee included Britons, Charles Hobbis, Tafi Evans and Miles Danby; German professor, Lutz Christians who lived and lectured at the KNUST until the 1970s, and American Labelle Prussin who wrote the first book on architecture in Ghana “Architecture of Northern Ghana” and was among a group that designed the housing units for displaced communities arising from the construction of the Akosombo Dam project on the Volta Lake. Prussin then worked with the Housing and Planning Department of the Faculty of Architecture at KNUST and later became a professor of architecture at an American university.

Under British rule, public building projects in the Gold Coast colony were designed by British architects. These projects include the design of the University of Ghana's classical Mediterranean buildings led by a Cyprus-based British architectural firm; Supreme Court of Ghana buildings, the Old Parliament House and the General Post Office in Accra. The Movenpick Hotel (previously known as the Ambassador Hotel) in Accra and the Komfo Anokye Teaching Hospital in Kumasi were both designed by Paton, a licentiate of the Royal Institute of British Architects. During the colonial period, Gold-Coast-based British architectural firms included Kenneth Scott and Partners; Nickson and Boris as well as James Cubitt, Scott and Partners that designed the Mechanical Engineering Workshop building of the KNUST. Other British architects who were practitioners of the then nascent academic field of “tropical architecture” were Jane Drew and Max Fry who designed the buildings of Bechem Teacher Training College in the Tano South District of the Brong Ahafo Region in addition to those at the Prempeh College and the Opoku Ware School, both in Kumasi.

=== Post-independent Ghana ===
During the Kwame Nkrumah administration in the 1950s, several architectural engineers were sent to the newly independent Ghana by Yugoslavia's Josip Broz Tito as a sign of friendship between the two nations. These architects from the former Eastern Bloc designed buildings using an international modernist approach which was considered globally trendy in that period. Such building designs included the Vice Chancellor's Lodge and the Senior Staff Club at the KNUST as well as various halls of residence at the KNUST such as Unity Hall, the eight-storey annex blocks of the Independence, Republic, Queen's and University (Katanga) Halls.

In 1960, Kwame Nkrumah appointed Theodore Clerk, the GIA's first president as the Chief Architect of the then newly created Tema Development Corporation (TDC) to develop the satellite city of Tema. When Clerk was elevated to the position of the chief executive officer of the corporation, another Ghanaian pioneer architect and GIA co-founder, Victor Adegbite became the chief architect of the TDC. The American architect, Max Bond who returned to his homeland after the 1966 coup d’état, designed Bolgatanga Regional Library. Bond later taught and worked in architecture schools in New York and was instrumental in the design of the Martin Luther King Centre in Atlanta, Georgia and the new African-American Museum in Washington, D.C. John Owusu Addo, a professor at the Department of Architecture at the KNUST and also the first Ghanaian native to head the department. For about twenty years, Anthony D. C. Hyland and William “Bill” Hill also taught in the same department. The German architect, Hannah Schreckenbach worked at the Public Works Department (PWD) and the Architectural & Engineering Services Limited (AESL) before joining the faculty at the Department of Architecture at the KNUST in the 1970s. Schreckenbach wrote a construction design textbook still used by students of architecture. In 1977, the GIA took part in the general strike and withdrawal of services by the Professional Bodies Association of Ghana, of which the GIA was a member.

Yaw Asante, the only non-architect to become architecture department chair at the KNUST supervised the expansion of department's infrastructure using the then novel idea of “internally generated funds”. The building designed under his tenure is currently used as the sixth-year architectural design studio for the M. Arch II programme which has replaced the former postgraduate diploma. In 2012, under the auspices of the KNUST, ArchiAfrika, a network connecting architectural scholars and professionals in the built environment, launched the ArchiAfrika Educational Network, a partnership of architecture schools across the African continent.

The development of Accra was spearheaded by an early Ghanaian architect of the Ghana Institute of Architects, David Wilberforce Kwame Dawson. Born on 6 February 2009. he was one of four architects at independence in 1957. Initially trained as a sanitary health inspector, he joined the Sekondi-Takoradi Municipal Council. Gifted in technical drawing, his superiors transferred him to the Drawing Office of the Railway and Harbour Administration as a draughtsman. He studied by correspondence at Bennet College in England before winning a colonial scholarship in 1944 to Leeds University where he graduated in architecture in 1946. He became an Associate of the Royal Institute of British Architects later that year. He returned to Accra in 1948 and became an Assistant Town Planning Officer at the Public Works Department, where he designed the Roof Loan Scheme. Dawson became the Director of Rural Housing in 1956 and working in tandem with Ghana's first leader, Kwame Nkrumah, R. P. Baffour, the first Vice Chancellor of the KNUST, engineer, J. S. Annan and others he contributed to rural development, architecture and town planning.

== Presidents ==
The following individuals have served as President of the Ghana Institute of Architects (GIA):

President	Tenure of office
T. S. Clerk	1962–65
Victor Adegbite	1965–70
Kenneth Scott	1970–71
O. T. Agyeman	1971–74
Martin Adu-Badu	1974–76
John Owusu-Addo	1976–77
Courage Togobo	1977–78
K. G. Kyei	1978–79
D. S. Kpodo-Tay	1979–80
E. L. Akita	1980–82
J. N. A. Attoh / Oko Adjetey	1982–88
M. K Boohene	1988–90
O. T. Agyeman	1990–93
H. D. L Yartey	1993–95
Theo Akofio-Sowah	1995–98
Kenneth Ampratum	1998–02
Steve Akuffo	2003–07
Nii Osah Odamtten	2007–10
Osei Kwami Agyeman	2010–13
Adotei Brown	2013–14
Joseph E. Hayford	2014–18
Richard Nii Dadey	2018–19
Kofi Owusu	2019–20
S.M. Quartey	2020–22
Foster Osae Akonnor	2022-
