= Akuafo Hall =

Student hall of residence, University of Ghana, Accra, Ghana

Location
- Legon; Accra, Greater Accra Region; Ghana
- Coordinates: 5°38′58″N 0°11′8″W

Information
- Type: Public
- Motto: Laboremus et sapiamus
- Established: 4 October 1955
- Enrollment: 4,523(unconfirmed)
- Color: Yellow Green
- Nickname: Hall of Excellence

Akuafo Hall, otherwise referred to as the Hall of Excellence, is the second hall of residence to be established in the University College of the Gold Coast now University of Ghana. The Hall has its own statutes governing the administration of its affairs while the affairs of students are organized and supervised by Executives of the Junior Common Room.

== Background Information ==
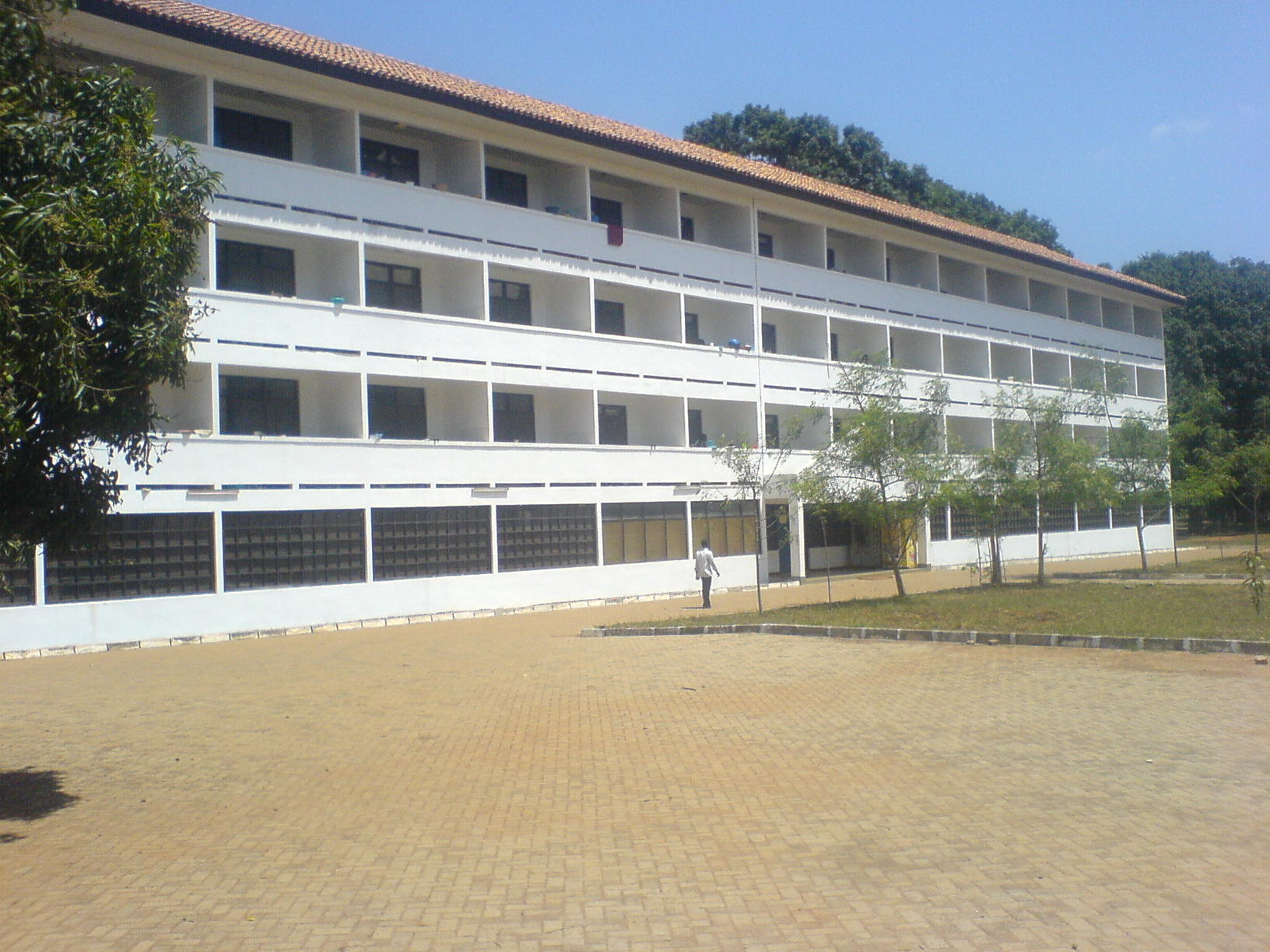
Annex c.

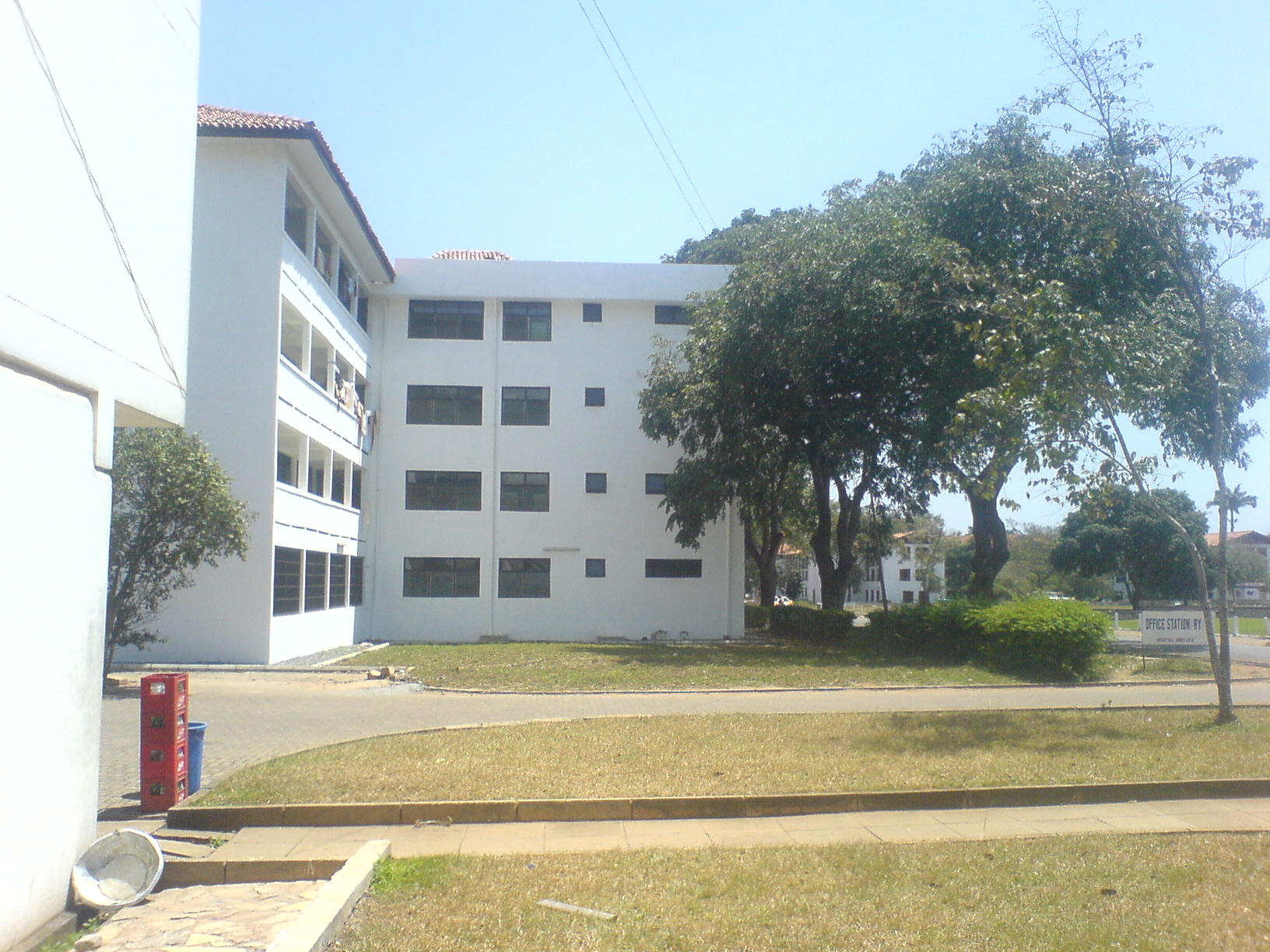
Annex d.

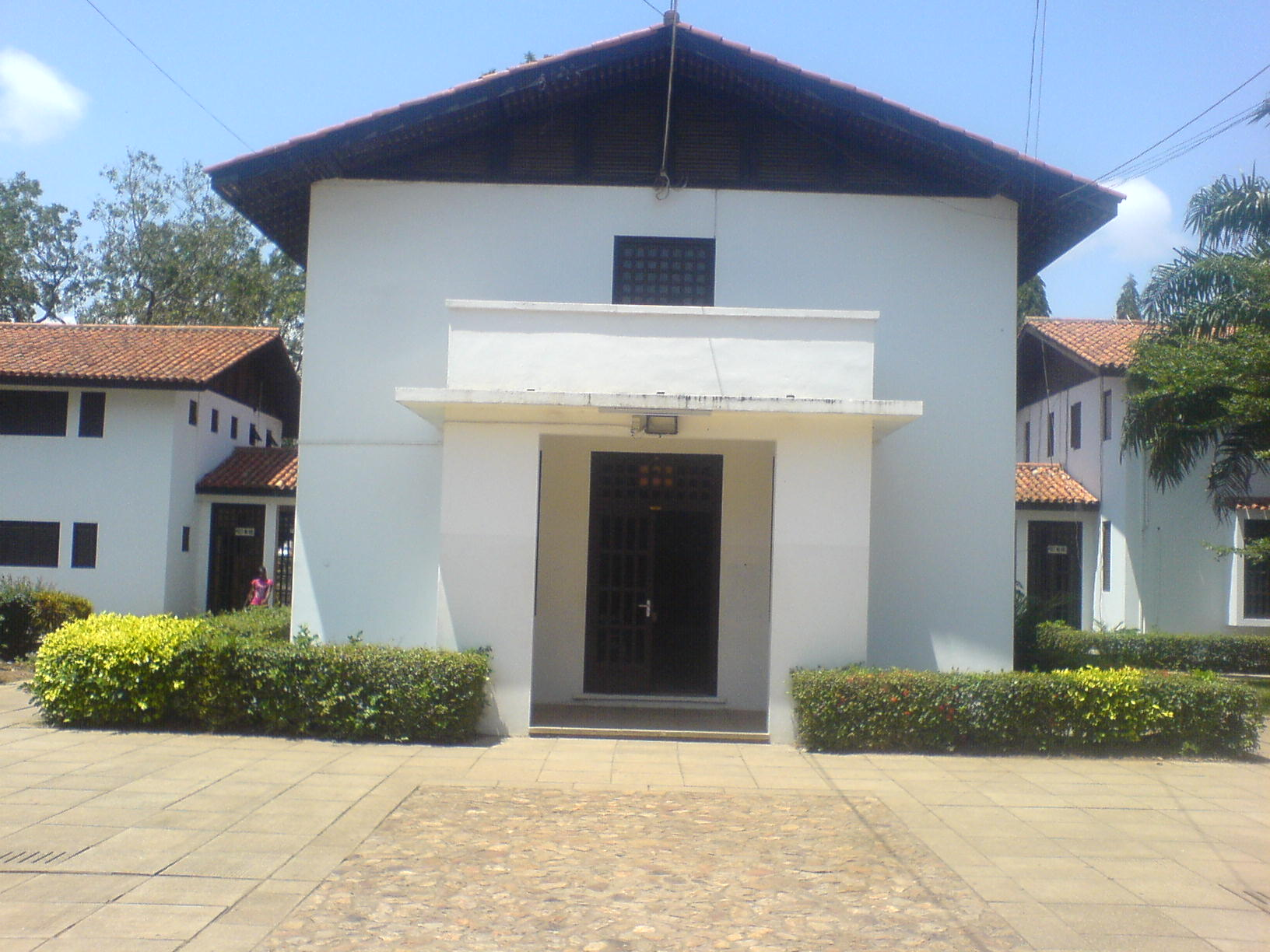
Chapel.

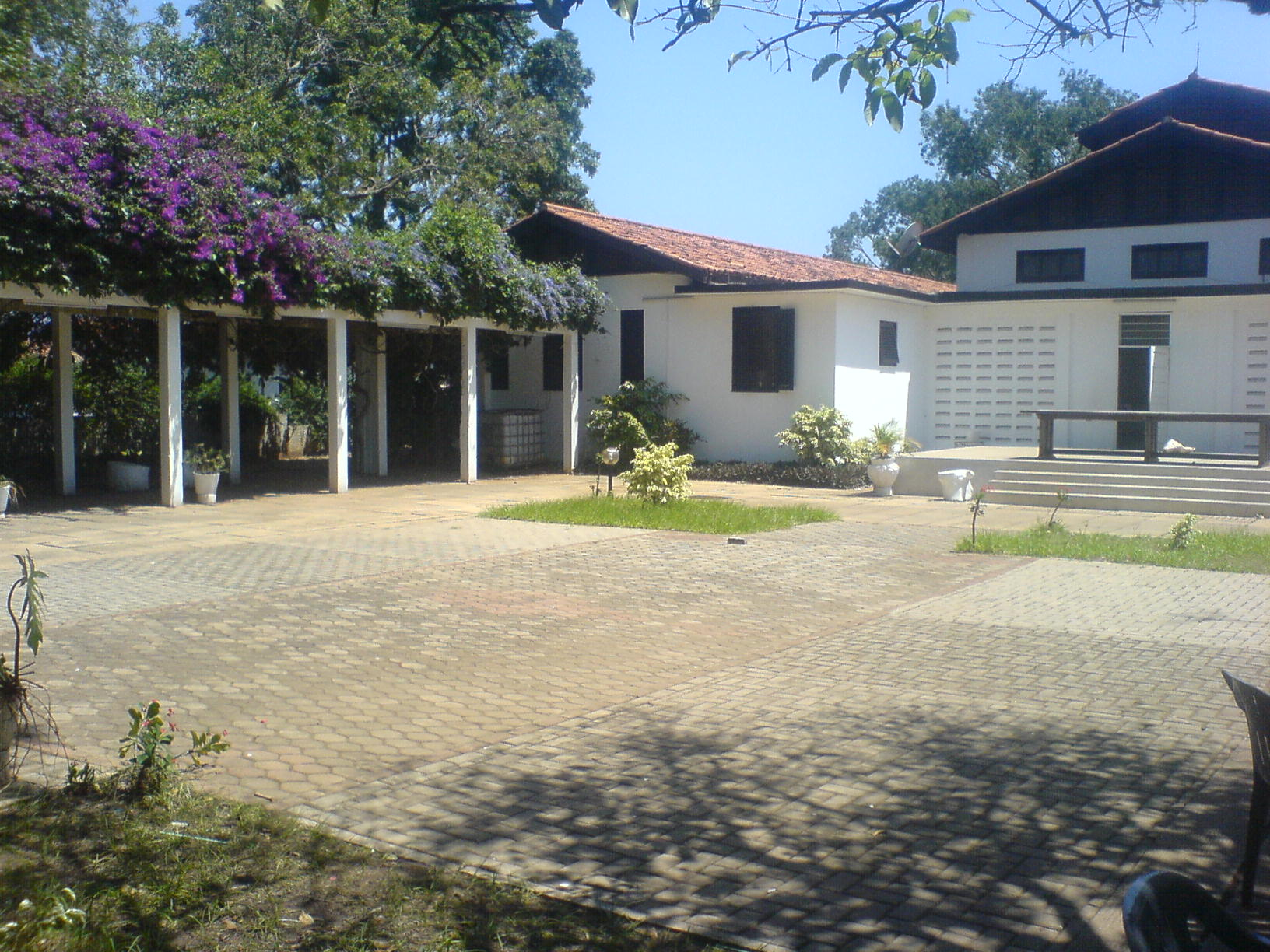
Gardens.

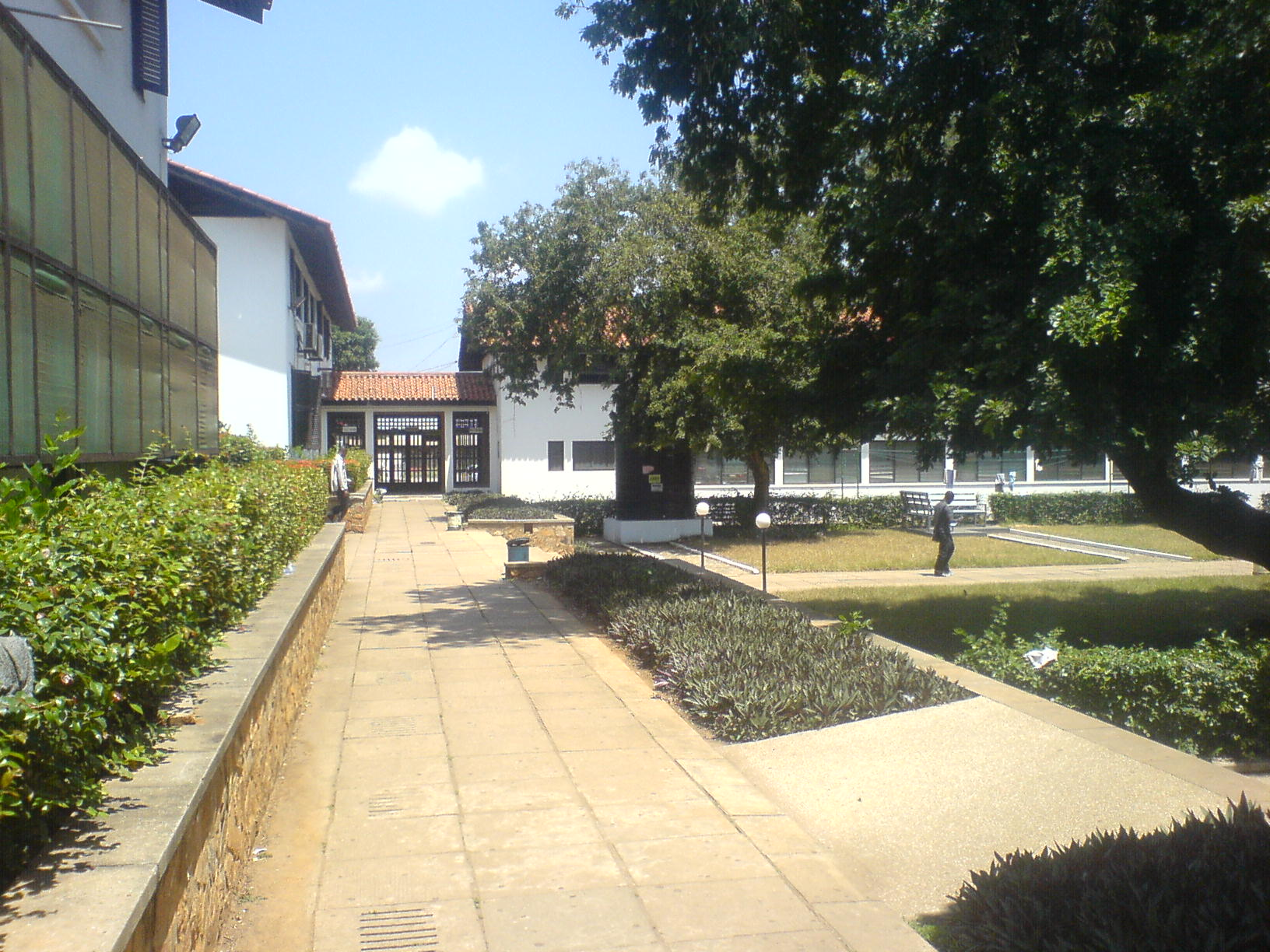
Main Hall.

Akuafo Hall started functioning in 1953 with the appointment of Prof. D A. Taylor as the Hall Master designate .A thirteen-member Hall Council was appointed to see to the academic and administrative activities of the Hall. In 1956, the Hall council decided to name the Hall Akuafo in appreciation of the generous gesture of the farmers of the then Gold Coast who through the cocoa marketing board contributed considerable sums of money for the establishment of Akuafo Hall as a Hall of residence. These farmers also contributed to other structural works for the University College of the Gold Coast in a project which was spearheaded by Dr. J. B. Danquah. The Government and people of the United Kingdom also contribute largely to the establishment of Akuafo Hall as the second Hall of residence. In appreciation of these contributions a tablet embedded in the floor of the porters lodge, in the main Hall reads;

This memorial tablet (A.D. 1955) records our gratitude to the people of the United kingdom for their unstinted aid in the building of Akuafo Hall and with grateful hearts we likewise commemorate those same farmers of this country whose generous giving and kindness have so often benefitted the university at large.

The Hall council also adopted a crest designed by Prof. L. H Ofosu-Appiah of the Department of classics as the official logo of the Hall, the crest depicts a cocoa tree, an open book and a drum with the motto of the Hall, Laboremus et sapiamus which directly translated in English means "Labour and wisdom" (Let us work and learn wisdom) Akuafo Hall was opened on 4 October 1955 by the Hon. Dr. Kwame Nkrumah, then first Prime Minister of Ghana. A highpoint of the opening ceremony was the unveiling of a plaque which commemorated the gesture of kindness of the Government and peoples of the United Kingdom as well as the farmers of the Gold Coast towards the establishment of the Hall. On 5 October 1955 the first junior members of the Hall received keys to their cubicles and formally assumed residence. Akuafo Hall was built to accommodate 600 students however two annexes (A&B) were constructed under the Regime of Lt. General Kutu Acheampong to provide the hall with additional accommodation. As at 17thJanuary, 2005 Akuafo hall officially accommodates 1,524 students Akuafo Hall began as male hall of residence with the first badge of 131 students each allocated a single room. However, in October 1991, Akuafo Hall admitted the first batch of female students and provided them with resident accommodation thus becoming a mixed hall in statu pupilari.

=== Hall tutorial system ===
Shortly after the first batch of students where provided accommodation in Akuafo Hall, the Hall council put in place certain measures that would encourage and nurture academic excellence and moral leadership in resident students of the hall. Thus the Hall tutorial system resulted in the quest of senior members to promote the intellectual and academic progress of resident students. Every resident student was assigned to a senior member of the Hall who was to him in loco parentis. The expression, in loco parentis, was taken very seriously and as such the tutor being in the position of a senior colleague served as a parent to a student in question while such a student continued to be resident in the hall. The tutors were often not teaching in the students’ academic discipline and thus given the duty to resolve problems confronting students so as to unable such students concentrate on the pursuit of academic excellence and moral leadership.

=== The combination room ===
After the establishment of Akuafo Hall, a Junior Common Room was allocate to resident students where such students could relax, debate over issues and interact with each other without any form of interference from senior members, similarly, the Senior Common Room provided senior members with a place for entertainment without interruptions from students. However, to avoid isolationism, the combination room was provided, where both student and lecturers could interact with each other. Prior to this development, a student was not permitted into the Senior Common Room without invitation by a fellow while on the other hand senior members entered the Junior Common Room only upon invitation. Thus the combination room made it possible for both senior members and junior members to interact freely with each other and engage in fun activities together. When the purpose of the combination room was changed, it diminished the informal contact between lecturers and students in the Hall.

=== List of Hall Masters of Akuafo Hall ===
Below is a list of past Hall Masters of Akuafo Hall.

Name of Hall Master	Tenure in Office
Prof. D. A. Taylor	1955–1959
Dr. David Kimble	1960–1962
Prof. L. H. Ofosu-Appiah	1962–1965.
Mr. Raphael S. Amegashie	1966–1968.
Dr. Thomas A. Mensah	1968-1968.
Mr. H. C. A. Bulley	1968–1975.
Rev. Prof. Gilbert Ansre	1975–1979
Prof. George C. Clerk	1979–1980
Prof. K. B. Dickson	1980-1980
Prof. S. K Gaisie	1981–1986
Mr. Y. Ofori-Anyinam	1986–1988
Prof. P. A. V. Ansah	1988–1992
Prof. J. N. Ayertey	1993–1999
Mr. E. Asiedu Yirenkyi	1999–2003
Rev. Prof. Cephas Omenyo	2003–2008
Rev. Dr. W. S. K Gbewonyo	2008– 2011
Dr. Vladimir Antwi Danso	2011-2013
Dr. George Akanlig-Pare	2013-2019
Dr. Clement K. I. Appah	2019-2021

== Membership and Organization ==
The Membership of the Akuafo Hall has remained the same since its inception; it consists of the Hall Master, Fellows, Honorary and Associate Fellows and Junior Members. The Hall Master is elected by Fellows, whiles Fellows are assigned to the Hall by the Vice Chancellor. Honorary and Associate Fellows are elected by Fellows while Junior Members are assigned to the Hall as members in Statu pupilari. The Administration of Akuafo Hall is supervised by a Governing Council consisting of all the Fellows assigned to it by the Vice-Chancellor. The Hall Council consists of the Hall Master, the vice Hall Master, the Senior Tutor, the Deputy Senior tutor, the President of the Senior Common Room, the Chapel Warden, the Hall Librarian, the Bursar(as Secretary), one representative of Junior workers, and two Junior Members representing the Junior Common Room(JCR) which is the student body of the Hall.

=== Student Government ===
Every Junior member that is affiliated to Akuafo Hall is an automatic member of the Junior Common Room of Akuafo Hall. The Junior Common Room (J.C.R) ensures that the interests of Junior members are protected. It also provides cultural, social and sporting activities for its members. The Executive of the Junior Common room represents the Akuafo Hall student body on all occasion, they negotiate with Hall authorities and other student groups in the university on behalf of students affiliated to Akuafo Hall and also embark on projects to improve conditions of living and learning for students in the Hall. The J.C.R derives its revenue from student contributions and contributions from the university through the Hall council. The J.C.R of Akuafo Hall serves as a recognized means for communication between Junior members and the Hall authorities.

In the past the government of the Junior Common Room (J.C.R) emerged from Political Parties that were formed in the Hall and modeled after national political parties but without the ideology or institutional affiliation to such political parties. These political parties came out with their manifestoes to contest the presidency of the Junior Common Room and other associated offices of the Halls student Government. Some of the Political Parties that have been formed in Akuafo Hall over the years include; the Liberal Party, Democratic Party, Socialist Party, Reforming Front Party, Capitalist Party, Imperialist Party, Operation knockout and Operation Victory.

Today, individual student campaign on their own ticket for executive positions in the Junior Common Room. The Junior Common Room is govern according to the rules and regulations codified in its own constitution, however the J.C.R constitution is subject to the statues of Akuafo Hall, the statues of the University of Ghana and the Constitution and laws of Ghana. The Senate is the Highest Decision-making body of the Akuafo Hall Junior common room.

=== The Chieftaincy System ===
One unique feature of Akuafo Hall is the existence of a chieftaincy system that was instituted in 1988. This institution serves as a symbol of unity for students and also helps to promote and showcase rich Ghanaian culture. The chief farmer and the Queen mother are elected annually and together with executive members of the Junior Common Room make up the membership of the Akuafo Hall Traditional council.

Oseadeeyo Addo Dankwa III has been the chief patron of this institution since its inception. He personally installs the chief farmer of Akuafo Hall during the annual Adinkra Durba which forms part of activities for Akuafo Halls’ annual Hall Week celebrations. In 2004, Nana Addo Dankwa III elevated the authority of the chief farmer to Paramount Chief during the installation of Nana Kwasi kankan Boadu as Paramount Chief and Nana Yaa Konadu Dua II as the Queen mother.

== Recognizing Recipients of the National Best Farmer and Fishers Award ==
Formerly the Governing Council of Akuafo Hall hosted the National chief farmer of Ghana as its distinguished guest on an annual basis. However, with the institution of the National Best Farmer Awards, the Hall Council has made it a policy to host all National Best Farmers and Fishers Award Recipients on the 1st Friday in the month of December. In further recognition of National Best Farmers and Fishers Recipients, the Hall council has inscribed the names of past Best Farmer Award recipients since 1986 in Gold, on a board in the potter lodge of the main hall, so as to immortalize their invaluable contribution to Ghana's developmental efforts. In addition to this, the Hall council inducts some of the National Best Farmers as Honorary Fellows of the Hall.

== Notable alumni ==
Akuafo Hall has produced several notable alumni and alumnae among whom are university dons

- Prof. Alexander Adum Kwapong
- Prof. Amonoo Neizer
- Prof. K.B. Dickson, Rev.
- Prof. S.K Agyepong, Rev.
- Prof. Ayettey
- Prof. Emeritus Albert A. Adu Boahen
- Prof. Emeritus George C. Clerk
- Prof Juctice A. Kodzo Paau Kludze
- Prof. Kwame Gyekye, Most Rev.
- Prof. Emeritus K.A Dickson, Rev.
- Prof. Gilbert Ansre
- Rev. Prof. Gaba
- Prof. Henrietta J. A. N. Mensah-Bonsu

Judges

- Justice Nicholas Yaw Boafo Adade
- Justice A. Adzoe,
- Justice Kpegah, former Supreme Court Justice
- Justice Acquaye,
- Justice A.A Forster. High Court
- Judges; Justice R. Apaloo
- Justice G. Quaye,
- Justice Yaw Appau, active Supreme Court Justice
- Justice Kaleo Bio
- Justice Prof. Henrietta J. A. N. Mensah-Bonsu, Justice of the Supreme Court

Traditional Rulers

- Togbe S. D. Sorkpor
- Nana Adusei Pok
- Nana Nyameye Baah
- Nana Owusu Ansah Kokroo II.

Statesmen

- Hon. J. S. Addo
- Hon. Freddie Blay
- Hon. Prof. Aaron Mike Oquaye
- Hon. Kwamena Bartels
- Mr. George Adjei Osekre
- Hon. K Osei Prempeh
- Hon. James Victor Gbeho
- Hon. Kofi Ator
- Hon. F.K Buor
- Hon. Joseph F.K.Abakah
- Hon. Mike K Akyeampong
- Hon. Johnson Asiedu-Nketia
- Hon. Amadu B. Sorgho
- Mr. Rex Owusu Ansah (Nana)

Religious leaders

- Most Rev. Emeritus Prof. K.A. Dickson
- Rev. E. S. Mate Kodjo
- Very Rev. A. A. Beeko
- Rev. Peter M. Kodjo,
- Rt.Rev. W. Blankson
- Rev. Dr. D. N. A Kpobi
- Rev. Dr. Annor Yeboah
- Rev. Maclean Kumi
- Rt. Rev. Dr. E. K. Asare-Kusi

In Law Practice

- Mr. Felix Ntrakwa
- Mr. Kwesi Amo-Himbson
- Mr. Martin Kpebu
- Mr. Samson Lardy Anyenini

In Commerce

- Mr. J. S. Addo
- Dr. Kwabena Duffuor
- Dr. I. E. Yamson
- Mr. Henry Dei
- Mr. Kenneth W. Mensah
- Mr. Welbeck Abrah-Appiah
