= Isabella Akyinbah Quakyi =

Ghanaian academic and physician

- Education: University of Surrey, Guildford; Brunel University London; London School of Hygiene & Tropical Medicine
- Occupations: Academic, physician

Isabella Akyinbah Quakyi is a Ghanaian academic. She is a professor of Immunology and Parasitology at the University of Ghana and the Foundation Dean of the University of Ghana School of Public Health. She is also a researcher in the field of medicine and a health practitioner. She is a fellow of the Ghana Academy of Arts and Sciences, and a fellow of the African Academy of Sciences. Professor Quakyi was recognized by Newsweek magazine as one of “seven women scientists who defied the odds and changed science forever”.

== Education ==
Quakyi obtained her Bachelor of Science degree from the University of Surrey, Guildford, and her master's degree from the Brunel University London. She acquired her PhD in Immunoparasitology from the London School of Hygiene & Tropical Medicine in 2001.

== Career ==
She has published more than 80 articles in 100 journals. She has also sat as the UNESCO Chair for Women in Science and Technology in the West African Region and other national and international boards and committees. Among her many accomplishments, Quakyi's scientific publications include work on the genetics of Plasmodium falciparum and the cloning of the CSP (circumsporozoite protein) gene from P. falciparum, efforts which contributed to the development of peptide vaccines and the testing of the first human malaria vaccine.

== Awards ==
Quakyi was awarded the 2019 Clara Southmayd Ludlow Medal by the American Society of Tropical Medicine and Hygiene for her work on tropical medicine.

In 2014 Quakyi received the Laureate of African Union Kwame Nkrumah Award for Women in Science.

== Selected publications ==
- DNA Cloning of Plasmodium falciparum Circumsporozoite Gene: Amino Acid Sequence of Repetitive Epitope. V Enea, J Ellis, F Zavala, DE Arnot, A Asavanich, A Masuda, I Quakyi, ... Science 225 (4662), 628-630. 1984
- Rationale for development of a synthetic vaccine against Plasmodium falciparum malaria. F Zavala, JP Tam, MR Hollingdale, AH Cochrane, I Quakyi, ... Science 228 (4706), 1436-1440. 1985
- Genetic analysis of the human malaria parasite Plasmodium falciparum, D Walliker, IA Quakyi, TE Wellems, TF McCutchan, A Szarfman, ... Science 236 (4809), 1661-1666. 1987
- A vaccine candidate from the sexual stage of human malaria that contains EGF-like domains. DC Kaslow, IA Quakyi, C Syin, MG Raum, DB Keister, JE Coligan, ... Nature 333 (6168), 74-76. 1988
- Human T-cell recognition of the circumsporozoite protein of Plasmodium falciparum: immunodominant T-cell domains map to the polymorphic regions of the molecule. MF Good, D Pombo, IA Quakyi, EM Riley, RA Houghten, A Menon, ... Proceedings of the National Academy of Sciences 85 (4), 1199-1203. 1988
- Recombinant Pfs25 protein of Plasmodium falciparum elicits malaria transmission-blocking immunity in experimental animals. PJ Barr, KM Green, HL Gibson, IC Bathurst, IA Quakyi, DC Kaslow. The Journal of experimental medicine 174 (5), 1203-1208. 1991
