= Andrea L. Graham =

American parasitologist and researcher

Andrea L. Graham is a professor of ecology and evolutionary biology and a former co-director of the Global Health Program at Princeton University. She is also an external faculty member of the Santa Fe Institute. She works in immunoparasitology to understand the evolutionary ecology of host defenses and parasite transmission strategies. In 2018, she was named a National Academy of Sciences Kavli Fellow, and in 2020 she was elected as a Fellow of AAAS. From 2006 to 2010, she was awarded a BBSRC David Phillps Fellowship to investigate immune responses to co-infection while at the University of Edinburgh.

Graham holds an A.B. in Biological Sciences & Sculpture from Mount Holyoke College and a PhD in Ecology & Evolutionary Biology at Cornell University.
