= Tagoe =

Tagoe is a surname. Notable people with the surname include:

- Annie Tagoe the British sprinter
- Clifford Nii Boi Tagoe the former vice chancellor at the University of Ghana
- Eddie Tagoe the Ghanaian actor who appeared in Withnail and I
- Prince Tagoe the Ghanaian footballer
- Daniel Nii Armah Tagoe the Ghanaian/ Kyrgyzstan footballer
