= Kpakpoe =

Kpakpoe is a surname. Notable people with the surname include:

- David Kpakpoe Acquaye (born 1928), Ghanaian academic and agriculturalist
- Joseph Kpakpoe Acquaye (born 1940), Ghanaian academic and haematologist
