= Ghana Academy of Arts and Sciences =

National learned society in Ghana, founded 1959

- Logo
- Abbreviation: GAAS
- Formation: 1959; 67 years ago
- Type: Learned society
- Purpose: Advancement and dissemination of knowledge in Ghana
- Location: P.O.Box KD 1178, Kanda - Accra, Ghana
- Region served: Ghana
- Official language: English
- President: Samuel Sefa-Dedeh
- Main organ: General Assembly
- Website: GAAS

The Ghana Academy of Arts and Sciences (GAAS) is a learned society for the arts and sciences based in Accra, Ghana. The institution was founded in November 1959 by Kwame Nkrumah with the aim to promote the pursuit, advancement and dissemination of knowledge in all branches of the sciences and the humanities.

== History ==
The Ghana Academy of Arts and Sciences began its life as the Ghana Academy of Learning, and was formally opened on 27 November 1959 by Prince Philip, Duke of Edinburgh, at the Great Hall of the University College of Ghana, who became its first president along with Nkrumah. It was incorporated by an Act of Parliament, the first of its kind in post-independent Africa. It was merged with the National Research Council in 1963 to become the Academy of Arts and Sciences. In 1968, it was again split into (a) The Ghana Academy of Arts and Sciences, which is a purely learned society, and (b) The Council for Scientific and Industrial Research (CSIR), which undertakes research of an applied nature related to national needs.

== Mission ==
The mission of the Ghana Academy of Arts and Sciences is to encourage the creation, acquisition, dissemination and utilization of knowledge for national development through the promotion of learning.

== Presidents ==
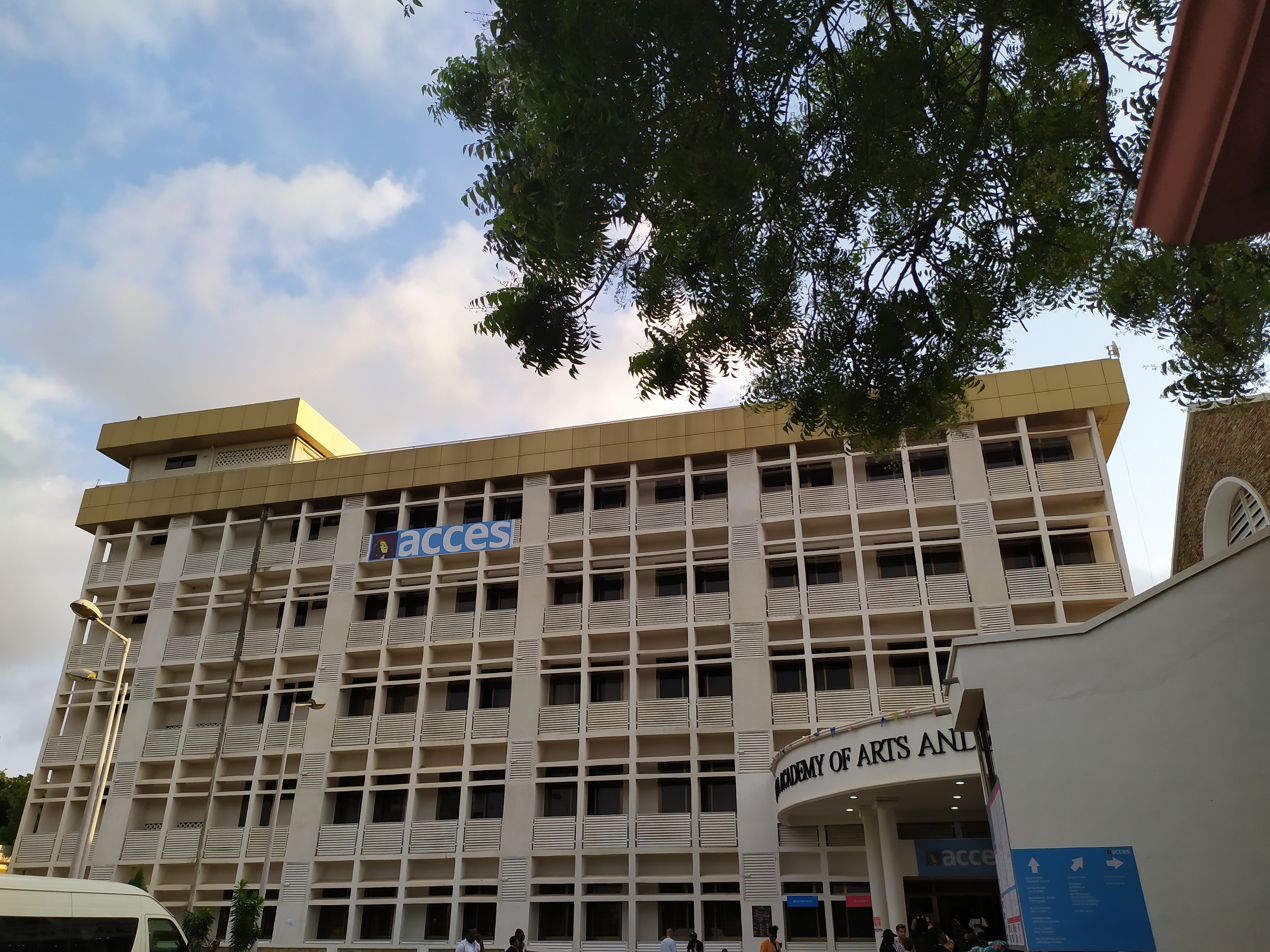
Building of Ghana Academy of Arts and Sciences in Accra

The following individuals have served as President of the Academy:

President	Tenure of Office
Prince Philip, Duke of Edinburgh	1959–1961
Kwame Nkrumah	1961–1966
Nii Amaa Ollennu	1969–1972
E. A. Boateng	1973–1976
Charles Odamtten Easmon	1977–1980
F. G. T. Torto	1981–1982
Kwesi Dickson	1983–1986
Emmanuel Evans-Anfom	1987–1990
Christian Baëta	1991–1992
D. A. Bekoe	1993–1996
J. H. Kwabena Nketia	1997–1998
Fred T. Sai	1999–2002
S. K. B. Asante	2003–2006
Letitia Obeng	2007–2008
R. F. Amonoo	2011–2014
Francis Allotey	2011–2014
Akilagpa Sawyerr	2015–2016
Aba Andam	2016–2019
Joy Henrietta Mensa-Bonsu	2019–2022
Samuel Sefa-Dedeh	2022–

== Fellows ==
Fellows

The society's members are elected fellows, who are entitled to use FGA as post-nominal letters. A General Assembly of Fellows may elect as a Fellow any Ghanaian national or resident who, in the Council's judgement, has significantly contributed to any field of the arts or sciences. A list of current fellows is maintained online by the GAAS.

Honorary fellow

The Council may elect as an honorary fellow any person of eminence in the arts or sciences who is not a Ghanaian citizen and has made significant contributions to the advancement of the arts or sciences.

== Notable Fellows ==
- David Kpakpoe Acquaye
- Marian Ewurama Addy
- Francis Allotey
- Daniel Afedzi Akyeampong
- Francis Agbodeka
- Albert George Baidoe Amoah
- Akosua Adomako Ampofo
- Aba Andam
- Kofi Annan
- Fred Kwasi Apaloo
- Emmanuel Quaye Archampong
- Ernest Aryeetey
- J. Kwabena Asamoah-Gyadu
- S. K. B. Asante
- Kwadwo Asenso Okyere
- Edwin Jackson Anafi Asomaning
- Edward S. Ayensu
- Jonathan Narh Ayertey
- E. A. Badoe
- Yaa Ntiamoah Badu
- Christian Gonçalves Kwami Baëta
- Kankam Twum Barima
- George Benneh
- Albert Adu Boahen
- Vincent Cyril Richard Arthur Charles Crabbe
- George C. Clerk
- J. B. Danquah
- Samuel Date-Bah
- Kwesi Dickson
- Silas Dodu
- Charles Odamtten Easmon
- RoseEmma Mamaa Entsua-Mensah
- Emmanuel Evans-Anfom
- Kwabena Frimpong-Boateng
- Robert K. A. Gardiner
- Ablade Glover
- Kwame Gyekye
- John Owen Hunwick
- Kobina Arku Korsah
- Felix Konotey-Ahulu
- Ebenezer Laing
- Ivan Addae Mensah
- Joy Henrietta Mensa-Bonsu
- Joseph Hanson Kwabena Nketia
- Kwame Nkrumah
- Daniel Ahmling Chapman Nyaho
- Letitia Obeng
- George Tawia Odamtten
- David Ofori-Adjei
- Susan Ofori-Atta
- Nii Amaa Ollennu
- Jane Naana Opoku-Agyemang
- Isabella Akyinbah Quakyi
- Fred T. Sai
- Ashitey Trebi-Ollennu
- William Bedford Van Lare
- Kwesi Yankah
- Fred Binka
