= Industrialisation in Africa =

Industrialisation in Africa has been slow, with most economies geared towards raw material exports. Colonial administrations attempted rapid industrialisation starting in the 1920s but largely prioritised resource extraction over domestic manufacturing. Post-independence governments in Africa pursued industrialisation as a means of economic development in the latter half of the 20th century, but the implemented policies achieved limited success amid structural challenges. Economic crises and neoliberal policies promoted by the World Bank and International Monetary Fund in the 1980s resulted in deindustrialisation. Despite high growth rates in the early-21st century, structural change toward growing manufacturing sectors was minimal. As of 2023, Africa remained the least industrialised continent in the world.

== History ==
Precolonial African economies were often based on agriculture, pastoralism, or trade, with the relative scarcity of factors of production (land, labour, and capital) determining their organisation. Common industries included textile manufacturing and metallurgy, although foreign trade is thought to have negated domestic production. In the 19th century, the Kingdom of Merina in Madagascar embarked on an unsuccessful industrialisation drive, which was hampered by desertions and revolts of the labour force. Colonial economic policies favoured open economies, focused on the immediate export of raw materials with little investment into growing domestic manufacturing. Starting in the 1920s, colonial administrations began rapid industrialisation at the expense of local needs, disrupting traditional agrarian economies and forcing people into exploitative labour markets for sectors such as mining and large-scale farming.

After Africa began decolonising in 1960, post-colonial governments implemented various policies aiming to grow their economies via state-led industrialisation to correct perceived market-failures, often advised by aid donors or international bodies such as the World Bank. A common policy was import-substitution (the replacement of imports with domestic products via protectionist policies), but governments focused on exporting raw materials in order to gain the capital to industrialise, and countries remained as suppliers of raw materials with little industrial development. While import-substitution policies initially led to growths in manufacturing, firms struggled to compete globally without heavy protection, and exports were low which tightened the balance of payments. Various scholars such as Ernest Aryeetey, Nelipher Moyo, and Justin Lin have argued much of this failure can be attributed to a lack of emphasis on comparative advantage.

In the 1980s, amid the neoliberalism wave of the Washington Consensus, international financial institutions such as the World Bank and International Monetary Fund (IMF) led a neo-classical 'revolution' against industrial policy, citing 'significant government failures' and debt crises, arguing that markets better allocate resources and that trade liberalisation would lead to development. The 1980s and '90s saw widespread deindustrialisation, and industrial production as a share of GDP declined from the 1980s onwards. From 1965 to 2005, industrial added-value had stagnated from 31% to 33%, showing little structural change. This trend continued between 2000 and 2010 despite growth rates of approximately 5%, which were largely derived from high commodity prices and did little to reduce poverty. Contrary to other regions' experiences, resources and labour have largely been transferred from agriculture (primary sector) directly to services (tertiary sector), bypassing manufacturing (secondary sector), largely as a result of trade liberalisation exposing manufacturing to fierce global competition. While weak institutions have led to regulatory failures, foreign direct investment (FDI) from Western countries, China, and India has improved industrial performances. During the 2010s, a trend emerged of economic growth decoupling from commodity prices. The African Union's Agenda 2063, adopted in 2015, highlighted industrialisation as one of its main priorities. In 2024 however, 90% of production exports were unprocessed goods. As of 2018, Africa's share of the world population was projected to rise from 17% to 40% by 2100, with many viewing industrialisation as a necessity to create the jobs demanded and reduce poverty.

== Strategies ==
=== Agricultural industrialisation ===
In 2012, scholars Ernest Aryeetey and Nelipher Moyo argued that agricultural modernisation is crucial to achieve structural change in African economies, drawing a distinction between 'vertical policies' (which target specific sectors that are inefficient or where the market fails) and 'horizontal policies' (that target market failures in the economy more broadly); they argued that despite vertical policies requiring greater effort and capacity due to the knowledge needed about specific industries, a mix of both is most beneficial. They view it as inevitable that transformations will begin in agro-industrial sectors.

In Agriculture, Autonomous Development, and Prospects for Industrialization in Africa (2025), Emmanuel Ndhlovu wrote that agriculture is "Africa's engine of development and prospect for industrialisation", and that it is most fitting due to the emphasis on close connections to land in traditional religions.

=== Sustainable industrialisation ===
Being one of the regions most endangered by climate change, a carbon-intensive industrialisation is widely viewed as infeasible, necessitating experimentation with transitions to renewable energy and decentralised access. A 2024 paper by Bruno Emmanuel Ongo Nkoa and Arnaud Barnabé Fonguen-Kong-Ngoh recommended establishing an international financing framework focused on energy transition industrialisation.

Writing in 2025, Ethiopian politician and development economist Arkebe Oqubay said that "green growth and carbon-neutral industrialisation are vital for African economic transformation". He recommends establishing and nurturing low-carbon industrial hubs, diversifying investment in renewable energies (such as hydropower), and funding research and development (R&D), especially in frontier technologies, early-on (seeking to leapfrog in emerging technologies). He also criticised the theory of degrowth as vastly unsuited to developing countries, as it does little to reduce poverty and create wealth.

=== Commodity-based industrialisation ===
In a 2014 paper, scholars Mike Morris and Judith Fessehaie considered how governments could use their high economic growth derived from commodity exports to fuel industrialisation. They recommended developing backward and forward linkages between firms in the capital-intensive commodity sector and the labour-intensive manufacturing sector, with the intent of creating jobs. They applied Albert Hirschman's three types of linkages: fiscal (the use of government revenue derived from the commodity sector to further industrialisation elsewhere), consumption (higher demand for processed goods due to higher wages in the commodity sector), and production (split into: forward linkages, involving processing commodities; and backward linkages, involving manufacturing inputs for the commodity sector). Morris and Fessehaie further argued that this ought to be achieved via cooperation facilitated and led by governments between important value chain participants, namely commodity firms, suppliers, customers, R&D institutions, and professional associations and unions.

== Reconceptualisations of development theory ==
The Euro–North American conceptualisation of development has come under heavy criticism from scholars and is largely rejected by development practitioners. Emmanuel Ndhlovu characterises it as the "mentality of unending accumulation predicated on dispossession and imperialism". Claude Ake stated that "development is not economic growth; it is not a technical project, but a process by which people create and re-create themselves and their life circumstances to realise higher levels of civilisation in accordance with their own choices and values. Development is something that people must do for themselves". Other scholars have also stressed the importance of agency. Universal definitions of development have been critiqued due to translations in different languages having different meanings, and Marja-Liisa Swanz said that "development cannot be transferred; it has to develop in the social conditions of each place".
