= Amoah =

Amoah is a surname. Notable people with the surname include:

- Albert George Baidoe Amoah, Ghanaian academic
- Cecilia Gyan Amoah (born 1947), Ghanaian diplomat and politician
- Charles Amoah (born 1975), Ghanaian footballer
- Joseph Amoah (footballer, born 1981), Ghana-born Liberian football player
- Joseph Amoah (footballer, born 1994), Ghanaian football player
- Matthew Amoah (born 1980), Ghanaian footballer
- Patrick Amoah (born 1986), Swedish footballer

== See also ==
- Yaw Fosu-Amoah (born 1981), South African long jumper
- Kofi Amoah Prah (born 1974), German long jumper
