= Frank Gibbs Torto =

Ghanaian chemist

Frank Gibbs Torto FGA, OV
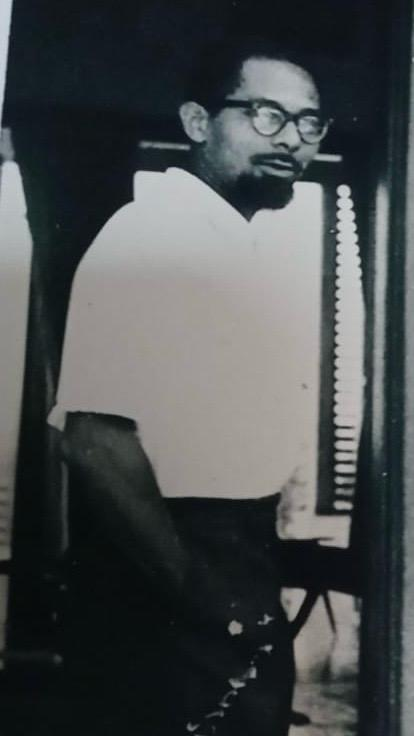
- Born: Frank Gibbs Tetteh O'Baka Torto; 10 October 1921; Accra, Gold Coast
- Died: 7 May 1984 (aged 62); Ghana
- Education: University of London
- Known for: First Ghanaian lecturer of the University of Ghana
- Spouse(s): Iris Aku Torto, née Akwei (m. 1949; died 2008)
- Children: 3
- Scientific career
- Fields: Chemistry
- Workplaces: University of Ghana

Frank Gibbs Tetteh O'Baka Torto, FGA, MV (10 October 1921 – May 1984) was a Ghanaian chemist and a professor at the University of Ghana. He was a founding member, vice president and later president of the Ghana Academy of Arts and Sciences. He was the first Ghanaian lecturer of the University of Ghana.

== Early life and education ==
Frank Gibbs Torto was born on 10 October 1921 in Accra.

He was educated in many elementary schools in the Gold Coast. In 1931, he enrolled at the Accra Academy as one of the school's foundation students. He completed in 1936 and joined the intermediate department of Achimota College a year later to pursue an intermediate bachelor's degree which he received in 1941. In 1942, he proceeded to the United Kingdom for his tertiary education. He was accepted into the Queen Mary University of London a constituent college of the University of London studying there from the bachelors level; graduating with first class honours to doctorate level, he was awarded his doctorate (Ph.D.) degree in chemistry in 1947.

== Career ==
He returned to Ghana in 1947 after his studies abroad and joined the faculty of Achimota College's intermediate department as a lecturer. A year later when the University College of the Gold Coast was founded he together with Walter Warwick Sawyer, D. K. Baldwin and Mary C. Charnley all from the Intermediate department were appointed as the first group of staff to form the nucleus of the university's teaching faculty thereby making him the first Ghanaian lecturer of the university. He was a lecturer of chemistry at the university in 1948 and a senior lecturer in 1957. He became a Ghana UNESCO National Commission member in 1958 and in 1959 became a founding member of the Ghana Academy of Arts and Sciences.

A year later, he was appointed a scientific consultant for the United Nations. In 1962, he rose to professorship status and the head of the chemistry department. That same year, he was named with Stephen Oluwole Awokoya by the then Secretary-General of the United Nations; U Thant among eight scientific secretaries for a United Nations conference on the application of science and technology for the benefit of less developed areas, a conference that was held in Geneva, Switzerland. In 1965, he was appointed president of the Ghana Science Association and a year later, president of the Association of Science Teachers.

In October 1968, he was a visiting fellow at Churchill College, University of Cambridge. He was then appointed dean of the faculty of Science at the University of Ghana in 1969 taking over from Alan Nunn May, he served in this capacity until 1971. In 1972, he became a member of the continuing committee of the Pugwash Conferences on Science and World Affairs. In 1973, he was made dean of the faculty of science for a second occasion. This time he served in that capacity for a year. In 1978, he served on the United Nations advisory committee on Science, Technology and Global Problems.

In 1979, he was appointed chairman of the board of the Ghana National Manganese Corporation. That same year, he was appointed vice president of the Ghana Academy of Arts and Sciences. He served in this capacity until 1981 when he was appointed president of the academic body.

In his lifetime, Torto served on various other committees and organizations some of which include; the Council for Scientific and Industrial Research – Ghana and the Council of the Centre for Scientific Research into Plant Medicine. He was also an editorial board member for the West African Journal of Biological and Applied Chemistry.

== Honours and legacies ==
He was a recipient of the member of the Order of the Volta award.

The University of Ghana award for best graduating student in chemistry is named after him.

The University of Ghana Chemistry building was also named in his honour.

== Works ==
Frank authored many articles that were published in scientific and general publications. His works have been featured in journals such as; the Journal of the Chemical Society, Nature (journal), West African Journal of Biological Science and the Ghana Journal of Science. Some of his works include;

- (contrib.) Some Problems in the Study of Plant Gum Polyssacharides, 1960;
- (contrib.) An Aldobiouronic Acid Isolated from Fagara xanthoxyloides Gum, 1961;
- (contrib.) The training of scientists in Ghana" in scientific world, 1964;
- (contrib.) Arms and African Development Ed. F S Arkhurst: Praeger, 1972;
- (contrib.) Views of Science Technology and Development Ed. V. Rabinowitch: Pergamon, 1975;
- Structure of the Alkaloid Wisanine (2-Methoxypiperine), 1981;
- University Chemistry in Developing Countries, 1981;

== Personal life ==
Frank married Iris Aku Torto (née Akwei) in 1949. Together they had three children; Oboshie Adjua Torto, Obodai Torto and Ofori Torto. He enjoyed listening to music in his spare time, and played classical piano. He died in May 1984.

== See also ==
- Ghana Academy of Arts and Sciences
