= Kwadwo Asenso Okyere =

Ghanaian academic and a former Vice Chancellor of University of Ghana

Kwadwo Asenso Okyere FGA

Vice-Chancellor of the University of Ghana
- In office 2002–2006
- Preceded by: Ivan Addae Mensah
- Succeeded by: Clifford Nii Boi Tagoe

Personal details
- Born: Kwadwo Asenso Okyere; 1947 Gold Coast
- Died: 2014 (aged 66–67)
- Occupation: Academic

Academic background
- Education: Tweneboa Kodua Senior High School; Prempeh College; University of Ghana

Kwadwo Asenso Okyere FGA (1947–2014) was a Ghanaian and a former Vice Chancellor of the University of Ghana He was a Fellow of the Ghana Academy of Arts and Sciences.

== Education ==
Asenso Okyere had his secondary education at Tweneboa Kodua Senior High School and Prempeh College in Kumasi. He was educated at the University of Ghana.
