= Samuel Sefa-Dedeh =

Ghanaian academic

Samuel Kofi Sefa-Dedeh
- Born: Samuel Kofi Sefa-Dedeh; 29 July 1949 (age 77); Suhum, Gold Coast
- Occupation: Academic
- Spouse: Araba Dankwa Walton

Academic background
- Education: Ghana National College
- Alma mater: University of Ghana; University of Guelph

Academic work
- Institutions: Ralston Purina; University of Ghana
- Main interests: Nutrition and food science

Samuel Kofi Sefa-Dedeh (born 29 July 1949) is a Ghanaian food technologist, academic, and researcher. He is an emeritus professor of the Faculty of Engineering Sciences and the president of the Ghana Academy of Arts and Sciences.

== Early life and education ==
Sefa-Dedeh was born on 29 July 1949, in Suhum, Gold Coast (present day Ghana), to Kwasi and Afua Nyarko. He attended Ghana National College for his secondary education and obtained a Bachelor of Science degree from the University of Ghana, Legon in 1972 and a Bachelor of Science (honorary) from the same institution in 1973 and went on to pursue graduate studies in food science at the University of Guelph in Canada, earning a Master of Science degree in 1975 and a Doctor of Philosophy degree in 1978. He also completed a postdoctoral fellowship at the University of Guelph in 1978.

== Career ==
Following his studies at the University of Guelph, Sefa-Dedeh worked as a scientist at Ralston Purina, St. Louis in 1979. In 1980, he returned to Ghana, where he served as a lecturer at the University of Ghana. He became a senior lecturer in 1985 and an associate professor in 1990. At the University of Ghana, he was made head of the Department of Nutrition and Food Science from 1990 to 1995. He later became the Foundation Dean of the Faculty of Engineering Sciences and the Dean of International Programmes at the same university.

In addition to his academic work, Sefa-Dedeh has served on various public bodies in Ghana. He was a member of the Public Service Commission of Ghana and the board chairman of the Millennium Development Authority (MIDA), and the Ghana Food Distribution Corporation.

Internationally, Sefa-Dedeh is a member of the International Council of Scientific Unions and the Institute of Food Technologists. He served as a science adviser to the International Foundation for Science in Sweden and was a member of the Committee on Science for Food Security.

Sefa-Dedeh is a Fellow of the International Academy of Food Science and Technology and served as the Vice President (Science) of the Ghana Academy of Arts and Sciences. He became the president of the academy in 2022. He has authored and co-authored numerous publications on food systems.
