= Frank Abor Essel-Cobbah =

Ghanaian politician

Member of the Ghana Parliament for Gomoa-Assin-Ajumako
- In office 1969–1972
- President: Edward Akufo-Addo

Personal details
- Born: 25 March 1936 (age 90)
- Education: Ghana National College; Kumasi College of Technology and University of Ghana
- Occupation: Lawyer

Frank Abor Essel-Cobbah is a Ghanaian politician and was a member of the first parliament of the second Republic of Ghana. He represented Gomoa-Assin-Ajumako constituency under the membership of the progress party (PP).

== Early life and education ==
Frank was born on 25 March 1936. He had his secondary education at Ghana National College, a senior high school in cape coast, Ghana. He further attended Kumasi College of Technology in Kumasi. He is also a graduate of the University of Ghana where he obtained his Bachelor of Laws Degree in Law. He later worked as a Lawyer before going into Parliament.

== Politics ==
He began his political career in 1969 when he became the parliamentary candidate for the Progress Party (PP) to represent his constituency in the Central Region of Ghana prior to the commencement of the 1969 Ghanaian parliamentary election.

He was sworn into the First Parliament of the Second Republic of Ghana on 1 October 1969, after being pronounced winner at the 1969 Ghanaian election held on 26 August 1969 and his tenure of office ended on 13 January 1972.

== Personal life ==
He is a Methodist.
