= Gilbert Ansre =

Ghanaian linguist, academic, priest and bible translation consultant

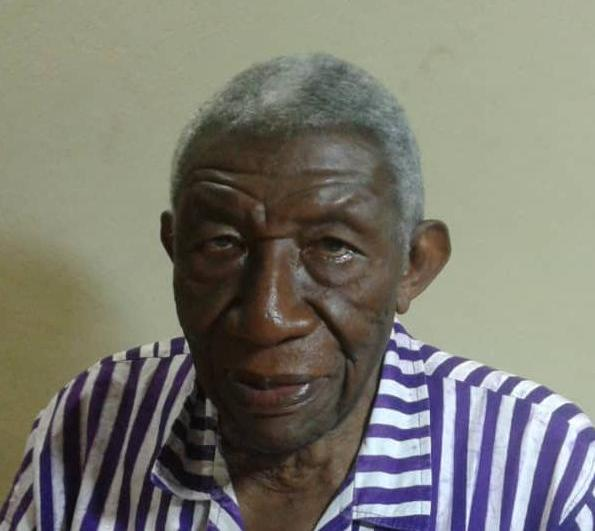
- Born: Gold Coast
- Occupations: Linguist; Lecturer; Priest
- Title: Professor

Academic background
- Education: University of London
- Thesis: The grammatical units of Ewe : a study of their structure, classes and systems (1966)

Academic work
- Discipline: Linguist
- Sub-discipline: Ghanaian languages
- Institutions: University of Ghana

Gilbert Ansre is a Ghanaian linguist, academic, priest and Bible translation consultant.

== Early life and education ==
He attended the Presbyterian Boys' Senior High School which was then known as the Presbyterian Boys' Secondary School at Krobo Odumase in the Eastern Region of Ghana. His university education was at the University of London where he graduated in 1966. The thesis he submitted was on "The grammatical units of Ewe : a study of their structure, classes and systems".

== Career ==
He worked at the University of Ghana where he was a professor in Linguistics. He first set up and led the Department of Linguistics at the University of Ghana. He was the Master of Akuafo Hall of the university between 1975 and 1979. His area of interest includes tone and syntax of the Ewe language.

Ansre has also lectured at the Good News Theological College and Seminary at Dodowa in the Greater Accra Region.

Gilbert Ansre is an ordained reverend minister of the Evangelical Presbyterian Church, Ghana.

== Bible translation ==
Ansre has been actively involved with Bible Translation work in Ghana and Togo. He was the Technical Advisor to the NYALOTA project to develop the Nyagbo, Tafi and Logba languages in the Volta Region of Ghana into written form. In 2017, he was the Chairman of the joint technical committee of the Bible Society of Ghana and GIILBT to analyze the Bible Translation needs of Ghana. He has been active in the work of the GILLBT especially in the area of translation of the Bible into various West African Languages. This has included the Ewe language, his own language as well as thirteen others.

== Honours ==
The Trinity Theological Seminary, Legon has an academic chair established in honour of Ansre and Kwesi Dickson. This is the Kwesi Disckson-Gilbert Ansre Distinguished Chair of Biblical Exegesis & Mother Tongue Hermeneutics. The contribution of Gilbert Ansre to the development of Ghanaian languages was recognised by the Ghana Institute of Linguistics, Literacy and Bible Translation (GILLBT), which awarded him the "Kwame Nkrumah African Genius award for African Languages" in February 2015 in Accra.

== Family ==
Gilbert Ansre was named after his father, Gilbert Bansah Ansre who was also a Presbyterian minister and was also a graduate of University of Edinburgh. His mother was Felicia Angelica Ansre (née Nane).

== Publications ==
- Ansre, Gilbert (1 January 1961). The Tonal Structure of Ewe (Hartford studies in linguistics). Hartford Seminary Foundation Bookstore.
- Ansre, Gilbert (1968). Conversational Ewe: Preliminary Edition.
- Ansre, Gilbert (1 January 1974). Fishman, Joshua A. (ed.). "Language standardisation in sub-Saharan Africa" in Advances in language planning (Contributions to the Sociology of Language) (1st ed.). De Gruyter Mouton. pp. 369–389. ISBN 978-3111210391.
- Ansre, Gilbert (1979). The Grammatical Units of Ewe. London: University of London. p. 1979.
- Ansre, Gilbert. Madina, Three Polyglots and Some Implications for Ghana. Institute of African Studies, University of Ghana.
- Loewen, Jacob A.; Ansre, Gilbert (1 April 1982). "Adjusting Biblical Names: The Nzema Case". The Bible Translator. 33 (2): 229–235. doi:10.1177/026009438203300206. S2CID 184544523.

== See also ==
- Ghana Institute of Linguistics, Literacy and Bible Translation
- Alan Stewart Duthie
- Kwesi Dickson
