= Ivan Addae Mensah =

Ghanaian chemist and educator (b. 1942)

Ivan Addae-Mensah FGA, FRSC, CV

Vice-Chancellor of the University of Ghana
- In office 1996–2002
- Preceded by: George Benneh
- Succeeded by: Kwadwo Asenso Okyere

Personal details
- Born: 10 January 1942 (age 84)
- Education: Achimota School; University of Ghana (B.Sc., M.Sc.); Churchill College, Cambridge (PhD)
- Scientific career
- Fields: Medicinal chemistry; Pharmacology
- Institutions: University of Ghana, Legon

Ivan Addae-Mensah, FGA, FRSC, CV (born 10 January 1942) is a Ghanaian chemist and university administrator who served as the Vice-Chancellor of the University of Ghana, Legon from 1996 to 2002. He is an Emeritus Professor of Chemistry at the same institution. He is a Life Fellow of the Royal Society of Chemistry, Fellow of the Ghana Academy of Arts and Sciences and a Fellow of the Ghana Chemical Society.

== Early life and education ==
Addae-Mensah is a member of the Nzema ethnic group. He was educated at Achimota School and studied Chemistry at the University of Ghana, Legon, receiving his bachelor's degree with first class honours. He also obtained a Master of Science (M.Sc.) degree in chemistry from the same university. Between 1967 and 1970, he pursued his PhD at Churchill College, Cambridge.

== Career ==
In October 1970, he was appointed a lecturer in Chemistry at the University of Ghana, Legon and rose through the ranks to become a full Professor. A Chartered Chemist (C. Chem.), his area of specialty is medicinal chemistry and pharmacology. He also worked at the Drug Research Unit, Faculty of Pharmacy, University of Ife in Nigeria and the Faculty of Pharmacy University of Nairobi, Kenya. He was an Alexander von Humboldt Foundation Fellow at the Institute of Pharmacy and Food Chemistry University of Erlangen-Nuremberg in Germany from 1982 to 1984. Ivan Addae-Mensah is a Life Fellow of the Royal Society of Chemistry. He is also a Fellow of the Ghana Academy of Arts and Sciences and was also the organisation's vice president for the Sciences for four years. He is a Fellow of the Ghana Chemical Society. In 1993, he was appointed the Dean of the Faculty of Science at the University of Ghana. Between 1996 and 2002, he served as the Vice-Chancellor of the same institution. After his retirement as a university administrator, he returned to the classroom and laboratory to continue teaching and research.

He has served as a knowledge consultant to several domestic and international institutions including the World Health Organization (Headquarters, TDR and Afro Region), UNESCO, UNFPA, the European Union (EU), the Ghana Statistical Service and several other national and international organisations. Since 1988, he has been a member of the WHO Expert Committee on the International Pharmacopoeia and Pharmaceutical Preparations and Drug Quality Assurance of Medicines chairing meetings of the Committee numerous times.

He was a member of the Expert Advisory Committee of the WHO/TDR/EU- funded malaria drug development initiative, and the TDR-ANDI Drug and Diagnostics Development Initiative. He is a member of the WHO-AFRO African Advisory Committee on Health Research and Development (AACHRD), and was involved in various meetings of AACHRD and WHO-AFRO to study, review and make recommendations on the WHO-CEWG report on Health research and development (R&D), Financing and Coordination.

Addae-Mensah served as the General Secretary of the Peoples National Party, PNC and Presidential Advisor to Hilla Limann. From 1980 to 1982, he was the Chairman of the Volta River Authority. He was appointed the Chairman of the National Petroleum Authority, Member of the National Council for Tertiary Education and the Council of the University of Mines and Technology at Tarkwa. Since 2001, Addae-Mensah has been a Member of the Board of the United Nations University Institute of Natural Resources in Africa.

He has been a champion of gender equity in educational opportunities as well as social mobility for the underprivileged.

== Honours, awards and legacy ==
Ivan Addae-Mensah has received several honorary doctorate degrees from the University of Ghana (Doctor of Science–honoris causa, 2003), New York University (Doctor of Humane Letters, 2002) and Soka University, Japan (Highest Honour, 1998). Under the leadership of John Kufuor, Addae-Mensah was awarded the State Honour of Companion of the Order of the Volta (CV) by the Government of Ghana in 2006 for his contributions to education and public service.

In 2016, the University of Ghana, Legon honoured him by naming a road intersection on its campus after him in recognition to his academic contributions and service to the institution.

== Personal life ==
He is married with 4 children. He is the father of Kojo Addae-Mensah, the current Group CEO of Databank.

== Books ==
- Family Background and Educational Opportunities in Ghana (Ghana Universities Press, 1973)
- Limann and Ghana (PNP, 1981)
- Towards a Rational Scientific Basis for Herbal Medicine: A Phytochemist's Two-decade Contribution (University of Ghana, Legon, 1992)
- Education in Ghana: A Tool for Social Mobility Or Social Stratification?(Ghana Academy of Arts and Sciences, 2000)
- Hilla Limann: Scholar, Diplomat, Statesman – A Biography (Africa Biographies Consult, 2016)
- My Life: A Historical Narrative – Autobiography of Ivan Addae-Mensah (Digibooks Ghana Limited, 2023)

== Bibliography ==
=== Selected scientific works ===
His published works include:

- Osei-Safo, Dorcas; Dziwornu, Godwin Akpeko; Appiah-Opong, Regina; Chama, Mary Anti; Tuffour, Isaac; Waibel, Reiner; Amewu, Richard; Addae-Mensah, Ivan (27 March 2017). "Constituents of the Roots of Dichapetalum pallidum and Their Anti-Proliferative Activity". Molecules. 22 (4): 532. doi:10.3390/molecules22040532. PMC 6154325. PMID 28346380.
- Evaluation of the quality of some antibiotics distributed in Accra and Lagos (2016)
- Influence of age and staking on the growth and cryptolepine concentration in cultivated roots of Cryptolepis sanguinolenta (Lindl.) Schlt Journal of Medicinal Plants Research (2016)
- Genetic diversity and cryptolepine concentration of Cryptolepis sanguinolenta (Lindl). Schlt. from selected regions of Ghana (2016)
- Isolation, characterization, and anthelminthic activities of a novel dichapetalin and other constituents of Dichapetalum filicaule (2015)
- Post-marketing surveillance of anti-malarial medicines used in Malawi (2015)
- Evaluation of the Quality of Artemisinin-Based Antimalarial Medicines Distributed in Ghana and Togo (2014)
- Analysis of pan-African Centres of excellence in health innovation highlights opportunities and challenges for local innovation and financing in the continent (2012)
- Natural Products and Antimalarial Drugs: Will Africa Provide the Next Major Breakthrough? (2012)
- The dichapetalins - Unique cytotoxic constituents of the dichapetalaceae in phytochemicals as nutraceuticals (2012)
- Traditional medicines as a mechanism for driving research innovation in Africa (2011)
- A comparative study of the antimicrobial activity of the leaf essential oils of chemo-varieties of Clausena anisata (Willd.) Hook. f. ex Benth (2010)
- ChemInform Abstract: Constituents of Tropical Medicinal Plants. Part 75. Absolute Configuration of Dichapetalin (2010)
- A ChemInform Abstract: Constituents of Tropical Medicinal Plants. Part 74. Dichapetalins - A New Class of Triterpenoids (2010)
- World Health Organization - Technical Report Series: Introduction (2010)
- Hispidulin And Other Constituents Of Scoparia dulcis Linn (2009)
- Phytochemical Analysis of Croton Membranaceus, a Plant Used in Traditional West African Medicine (2008)
- Dichapetalin M from Dichapetalum madagascariensis (2008
- Cardiovascular Effect of Artemisia Afra and its Constituents (2008)
- Essential Oils of Lippia Species in Kenya. IV: Maize Weevil (Sitophilus Zeamais) Repellancy and Larvicidal Activity (2008)
- Isolation and characterization of dipeptide derivative and phytosterol from Capparis tomentosa Lam (2008)
- A novel D:A-friedooleanane triterpenoid and other constituents of the stem bark of Dichapetalum barteri Engl (2007)
- A novel D:A-friedooleanane triterpenoid and other constituents of the stem bark of Dichapetalum barteri Engl. (2006)
- WHO Expert Committee on specifications for pharmaceutical preparations (2006)
- WHO Technical Report Series: WHO Expert Committee on specifications for pharmaceutical preparations. Thirty-ninth report (2005)
- X-Ray Crystal Structure of a Naturally Occurring trans-2-cis-4-Isomer of Wisanine, a Piperine-Type Alkaloid From Piper guineense (2004)
- WHO Expert Committee on Specifications for Pharmaceutical Preparations (2004)
- WHO Expert Committee on Specifications for Pharmaceutical Preparations (2003)
- (E)- and (Z)Foeniculin, Constituents of the Leaf Oil of a New Chemovariety of Clausena anisata (2000)
- Isoflavones and coumarins from Miletia thonningii (1999)
- WHO expert committee on specifications for pharmaceutical preparations: Geneva, 21–25 April 1997 (1999)
- Aromatic plants of Kenya III: Volatile and some non-volatile constituents of Croton sylvaticus Hochst (1998)
- The dichapetalins—A new class of triterpenoids (1996)
- The absolute configuration of dichapetalin A (1996)
- (E)Anethole as a Major Essential Oil Constituent of Clausena anisata (1996)
- Geranial and Neral, Major Constituents of Lippia multiflora Moldenke Leaf Oil (1996)
- Leaf Oil of Melaleuca quinquenervia from Benin (1996)
- Essential oils of Cympogon shoenanthus and Lippia multiflora from Togo (1996)
- Dichapetalin A, A Novel Plant Constituent from Dichapetalum madagascariense With Potential Antineoplastic Activity (1995)
- Pyrano- and dihydrofurano-isoflavones from Milletia thonningii (1995)
- Essential Oil of Diplolophium africanum Turcz (1994)
- Antifeedant activity of Piper guineense Schum & Thonn. Amides against larvae of the sorghum stem borer Chilo partellus (Swinhoe) (1992)
- The absolute configuration of chiromodine (1992)
- Epoxychiromodine and other constituents of Croton megalocarpus (1992)
- Constituents of the stem bark and twigs of Croton macrostachy(u)s (1992)
- Trypanocidal Activity of a Selection of Naturally Occurring Compounds (1991)
- A New Triterpenoid Ester from Croton megalocarpus (1991)
- Essential Oils of Two Lippia ukambensis Vatke Chemotypes and Lippia somalensis Vatke in Kenya (1991)
- Essential oils of Kenyan Lippia species. Part III (1991)
- A clerodane diterpene and other constituents of Croton megalocarpus (1989)
- A Pharmacological Investigation of the Hypoglycemic Activity of Artemisia afra (1989)
- Comparative examination of two Zanthoxylum benzophenanthridine alkaloids for effects in rabbits (1989)
- Essential oils of Lippia wilmsii (1989)
- Quercetin-3-neohesperidoside (rutin) and other flavonoids as the active hypoglycaemic agents of Bridelia ferruginea (1989)
- 9-Methoxychelerythrine as a True Natural Product. Its Antimicrobial Activity and Cardiovascular Effects (1989)
- Chiromodin a Novel Clerodane-Type Diterpene from Croton megalocarpus (1989)
- Structure and Anti-Hypertensive Properties of Nitidine Chloride from Fagara Species (1987)
- Larvicidal Effects of Six Amide Alkaloids from Piper guineense (1986)
- Addae-Mensah, Ivan; Achenbach, Hans (January 1985). "Terpenoids and flavonoids of Bridelia ferruginea". Phytochemistry. 24 (8): 1817–1819. Bibcode:1985PChem..24.1817A. doi:10.1016/S0031-9422(00)82558-3.
- Sesquiterpenes from Carissa edulis (1985)
- Cheminform Abstract: Constituents of West African Medicinal Plants, XVI. Novel Long-Chain Triacylbenzenes from Cochlospermum Planchonii (1985)
- Constituents of West African Medicinal Plants, XVI. Novel Long-chain Triacylbenzenes fromCochlospermum planchonii (1985)
- New Di-isoprenylated Indole Derivatives from Hexalobus crispiflorus (1984)
- Lignans and other constituents from Carissa edulis (1983)
- Effects of wisanine and dihydrowisanine on aggressive behaviour in chicks (1983)
- ChemInform Abstract: Constituents of West African Medicinal Plants. X. Study of the Constituents Of Hexalobus Crispiflorus (1983)
- 12-Methoxy-17,18-dehydro-vincamine and 16-epi-isositsirikine, alkaloids from Tabernaemontana psorocarpa (1982)
- Constituents of West African medicinal plants, VIII. 3-Hydroxynornuciferine and 3-hydroxy-6a,7-dehydronuciferine, minor alkaloids in Hexalobus crispiflorus - mass spectrometry in the structure elucidation of noraporphines (1982)
- Inhaltsstoffe Westafrikanischer Arzneipflanzen, X. Untersuchung der Inhaltsstoffe vonHexalobus crispiflorus (1982)
- Alkaloids in tabernaemontana species, VIII. Tabernulosine and 12-demethoxytabernulosine, two new alkaloids of the picrinine-type from Tabernaemontana glandulosa (1982)
- Inhaltsstoffe Westafrikanischer Arzneipflanzen, VIII. 3-Hydroxynornuciferin und 3Hydroxy6a,7-dehydronuciferin, Nebenalkaloide inHexalobus crispiflorus — Massenspektrometrische Strukturfestlegung an Noraporphinen (1982)
- Alkaloide in Tabernaemontana-Arten, VIII. Tabernulosin und 12-Demethoxytabernulosin, zwei neue Alkaloide vom Picrinin-Typ ausTabernaemontana glandulosa (1982)
- Iridoid and other constituents of Canthium subcordatum (1981)
- X-ray crystal structure of a novel alkaloid from the medicinal plant Piper guineense (1981)
- Structure of the alkaloid wisanine (2-methoxypiperine) (1981)
- A Naturally Occurring trans-2-cis-4-Isomer of Wisanine from Piper guineense (1981)
- Shanzhisin methyl ester gentiobioside, a new iridoid - isolation and synthesis (1980)
- Colouring Matters of the Aphidoidea. XLIV. A Survey of Long-Chain Acid Derivatives From Aphid Lipids Compared With Those of Related Insects. Glycerides of Octa-2,4,6-Trienoic Acid (1978)
- N-Isobutyl-trans-4-licosadienamicle and other alkaloids of fruits of Piper guineense (1977)
- Novel amide alkaloids from the roots of Piper guineense (1977)
- A preliminary pharmacological study of wisanine, a piperidine type alkaloid from the roots of Piper guineense [proceedings] (1977)
- Wisanine, a novel alkaloid from the roots of piper guineense (1976)
- Fagaridine: A phenolic benzophenanthridine alkaloid from Fagara xanthoxyloides (1973)
- Torto, F.G.; Mensah, I.A. (April 1970). "Alkaloids of Fagara macrophylla". Phytochemistry. 9 (4): 911–914. Bibcode:1970PChem...9..911T. doi:10.1016/S0031-9422(00)85206-1.
- Photolysis of t-butyl-substituted p-benzoquinone mono-and - di-imine derivatives (1970)
