= Ghana National College =

Boarding school in Cape Coast, Ghana

- School crest

Location
- P. O. Box 161; Cape Coast, Menyamawu Hills; Ghana

Information
- School type: Government funded, Public Secondary/High School
- Motto: Pro Patria
- Established: 20 July 1948; 77 years ago
- Founder: Kwame Nkrumah
- Status: Active
- School board: Board of Governors
- Category: B
- Authorizer: Ministry of Education (Ghana)
- Headmaster: Mr Nana Joseph Ato Sarpong
- Faculty: 5
- Grades: Form 1 (15th grade) – Form 3 (25th grade)
- Gender: Co-ed (Boys/Girls)
- Age: 15 to 18
- Enrollment: 1300
- Language: English
- Campus: Suburban
- Houses: 4 Male, 8 Female
- Colors: Maroon, green and cream
- Mascot: Nana
- Nickname: Nashnal
- Accreditation: Ghana Education Service
- National ranking: Top 20
- Yearbook: Nananom magazine
- Affiliation: None
- Alumni: Ghana National Past Students Association (NANANOM)
- School anthem: The Joys of Ghanacoll
- Website: www.ghananationalcollege.org

Ghana National College is a senior high school in Cape Coast, Ghana.

== Overview ==
Ghana National College was founded on 20 July 1948, staffed by dismissed teachers from St Augustine's College and Mfantsipim School. The college was founded by the first Ghanaian President Dr. Kwame Nkrumah using his own funds, for eight students who had been expelled by the British colonial administration from St Augustine's College. The expulsion resulted from a protest march, held in solidarity with Nkrumah, who was then imprisoned.

== Notable alumni ==
In 2014 the college created a Hall of Fame to honour alumni. The first inductees were Francis Allotey, Samuel Sefa-Dedeh, Jophus Anamuah-Mensah, Anthony Annan-Prah, David Taylor, Lee Tandoh-Ocran and Kobby A. Koomson. The alumni of Ghana National College are normally called Nananom. Other notable alumni include:

- Nana Aba Anamoah, media personality, news anchor and broadcaster
- Kwesi Armah, formerly Ghana's High Commissioner to the United Kingdom
- Emmanuel Alexander Erskine, 1st UNIFIL Commander
- Gladys Asmah – Former minister of Fisheries
- Anthony Annan – Ghanaian international footballer / Schalke 04
- Frank Abor Essel-Cobbah – Member of parliament during the second republic
- Damoah – Ghanaian author
- Ernest Debrah – Ghanaian politician, former minister for Food and Agriculture
- Kwame Gyewu-Kyem – Member of parliament of the first parliament of the fourth republic
- Diana Hamilton – Ghanaian musician
- Winston Mensah-Wood – Former Chief of Defence Staff, and Chief of the Army Staff
- Charlotte Osei – lawyer and former chairperson of the Electoral Commission of Ghana
- Abeiku Santana – radio and TV personality
- Asiedu Walker – Ghanaian politician
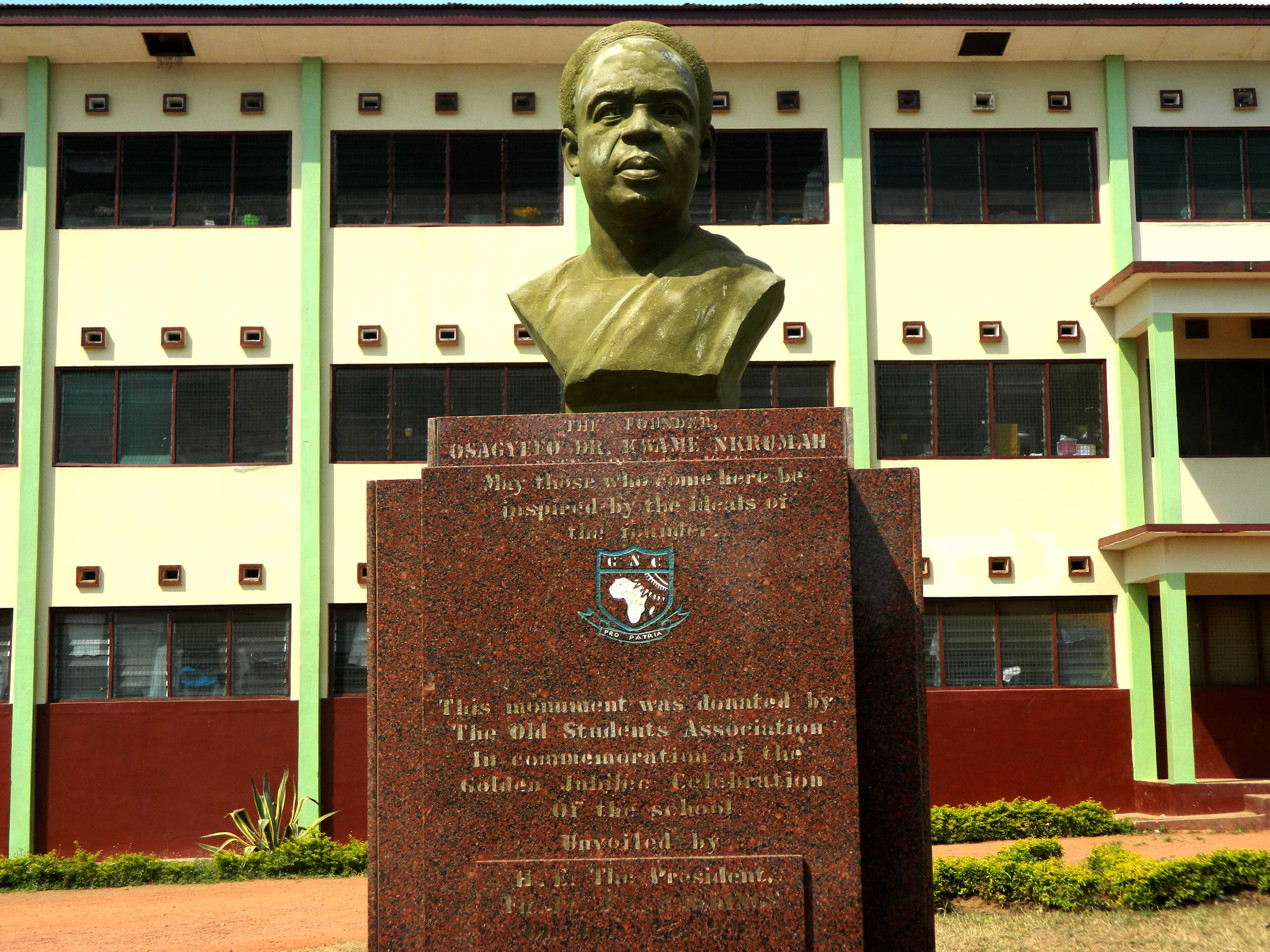
- Ghana National College Monument
  Cynthia Tima Yeboah, popularly known as Tima Kumk – Ghanaian television and radio presenter, actress, media practitioner and voice-over artist.
