= Ayikwei Bulley =

Ghanaian academic

- Born: Herbert Claudius Ayikwei Bulley; 1925; Gold Coast
- Died: 2002 (aged 76–77)
- Occupation: academic
- Spouse: Jemima Bulley

Academic background
- Education: University of London; Columbia University; University of Toronto

Herbert Claudius Ayikwei Bulley (1925–2002) was a Ghanaian social scientist. He is known for his pioneering work in Psychology in Ghana. He was a founding faculty member of the Department of Psychology at the University of Ghana. Bulley is a former Dean of the Faculty of Social Sciences of the University of Ghana.

== Early life ==
H. C. Ayikwei Bulley was born in 1925. He was educated at the Accra Academy for his secondary education, completing in 1944. He went on to study at the University of London for his undergraduate degree and continued to Columbia University for a master's degree and to the University of Toronto for a second master's degree.

== Career ==
Bulley began his teaching career at the University of Ghana as a lecturer in the Sociology department.

In October 1967, he was transferred to the Psychology department to support Cyril Edwin Fiscian in starting the department. With his arrival, the teaching staff numbered only two. In the Lent term, Gustav Jahoda, Professor of Psychology at the University of Strathclyde, Glasgow came in as visiting professor. Bulley became the chair of the Department of Psychology, and acted for many years.

On 10 January 1968, Bulley was made Vice-Master of Akuafo Hall. On 1 April 1968 he was made Senior Tutor of Akuafo Hall and was appointed in that same year to act as Hall Master from 1968 to 1975.

On 21 January 1981 he delivered a public lecture marking the Golden Jubilee of the Accra Academy chaired by Nathan Quao at the British Council Hall in Accra.
