= Reginald Fraser Amonoo =

Ghanaian academic (born 1932)

- Born: Reginald Fraser Amonoo; 16 June 1932 (age 94); Gold Coast
- Occupation: Academic

Academic background
- Education: University of Ghana; University of Manchester; University of Paris

Academic work
- Institutions: University of Ghana
- Main interests: 17th century French drama and African literature.

Reginald Fraser Amonoo (born 16 June 1932) is a Ghanaian academic. He is a retired professor of modern languages at the University of Ghana and the University of Zimbabwe. He is a former president of the Ghana Academy of Arts and Sciences.

== Early life and education ==
Amonoo was born on 16 June 1932. He had his secondary education at Achimota School from 1943 to 1950. He entered the University College of the Gold Coast in 1951 and obtained his bachelor's degree in 1956. He continued at the University of Manchester in 1956 for his masters' and doctorate degree which was awarded to him in October, 1958. He studied at the University of Paris, Sorbonne from 1962 to 1965.

== Career ==
=== Academic ===
A year after his studies abroad, he joined the faculty of the University of Ghana as acting head and later head of the modern languages department. He served in that capacity until 1980. During that period he acted as the dean of arts on various occasions. He became substantive dean of arts in 1984 until 1988. He was a professor of French Literature at the Department of Modern Languages at the University of Zimbabwe and also served as an external examiner for universities in Botswana, Ghana, Nigeria and Sierra Leone.

=== Ghana Academy of Arts and Sciences ===
Amonoo was elected as a fellow of the Ghana Academy of Arts and Sciences in 1972. He served as the academy's treasurer from 1977 to 1988. In 1989 he served as the honorary secretary of the academic body and he became president of the academy from 2011 to 2014.

=== Other engagements ===
Amonoo was a consultant for the Association of African Universities at ECOWAS, UNESCO-BREDA, Dakar on various areas, some of which include; higher education manpower requirements and training, academic standards, and equivalences of certificates and courses. He was once president of the International Federation of Modern Languages and Literatures (FILLM) and also an honorary treasurer for the International Council for Philosophy and Humanistic Studies (CIPSH - UNESCO).

== Publications ==
His research writings have encompassed 17th century French drama, mostly on Corneille who happened to be the subject of his D.U.P. thesis; The fortunes of Cornelian drama in France, during the Consulate, Empire and Restoration periods. His focus has also been on African literature and language problems. Some of his publications are as follows;

- Corneille's Rome myths and realities
- Reflections on cultural contacts:the case of Francophone African literature, Arizona State University Press, 1983.
- Problems of Ghanaian lingue franche in Language in Africa, C.U J5., 1963.

Some of his French writings have been cited in other publications such as;

- The resurrection of Corneille at the beginning of the XlXth century in a Modem Miscellany offered to Prof. Vinaver, M.U.P., 1969.
- "Corneille and the Romantics", in the Acts of the Tercentennial Symposium, Rouen, 1984, P.U.F., 1985.

== Awards ==
Amonoo was awarded the Vermilion Medal by the French embassy in Ghana for his contribution to French literature.

== See also ==
- Ghana Academy of Arts and Sciences
