= Ebenezer Oduro Owusu =

Ghanaian academic (born 1960)

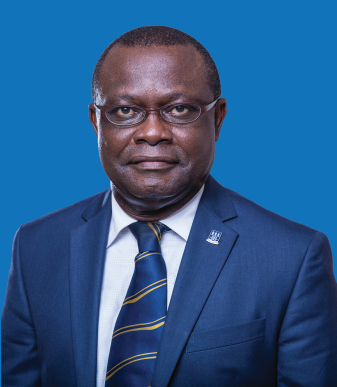

President of Presbyterian University College
- Incumbent
- Assumed office 1 February 2022

Vice-chancellor of University of Ghana
- In office 1 August 2016 – 31 July 2021
- Preceded by: Ernest Aryeetey
- Succeeded by: Nana Aba Appiah Amfo

Personal details
- Born: Ebenezer Oduro Owusu; 11 December 1960 (age 65) Tarkwa, Ghana
- Education: St. Peter's Boys Senior High School; Ghana Secondary Technical School; University of Ghana (BSc, Agriculture); Kochi University (MSc, Agricultural Chemistry; PhD, Entomology)
- Occupation: Academic; Entomologist; University administrator
- Profession: Professor
- Scientific career
- Fields: Entomology
- Workplaces: University of Ghana, Legon

Ebenezer Oduro Owusu (born at Tarkwa, on 11 December 1960) is a Ghanaian entomologist and university administrator who served as the Vice Chancellor of the University of Ghana from 1 August 2016 to 31 July 2021. In this role, he was the principal academic and administrative officer of the university. Owusu is a professor of entomology at the Department of Animal Biology and Conservation Science and prior to his appointment as vice-chancellor, he was the provost of the College of Basic and Applied Sciences at the University of Ghana. He is the current president of the Presbyterian University College.

== Early life and education ==
Ebenezer Oduro Owusu was born to Ebenezer Owusu Okyere who hails from Mpraeso-Kwahu and Florence Ekua Soma Intsiful (deceased), who was from Elmina. He started his elementary school education at the Cocoa Research Institute of Ghana (CRIG) Primary School, Akim Tafo, from where he proceeded to St Peter's Secondary School, Nkwatia Kwahu for his Ordinary Level School Certificate. He later did his advanced level at Ghana Secondary Technical School (GSTS), Takoradi. He gained admission to the University of Ghana to read BSc in Agriculture and graduated with a Second class Upper Division in 1987.

He later served as a teaching/research assistant in the Department of Crop Science for two years. Owusu was awarded the prestigious Japanese Government Scholarship (MONBUSHO) in October 1989 and left Ghana to pursue his Master of Science degree at Kochi University, Japan. He successfully completed his Masters (Agricultural Chemistry) in 1992 and was awarded another scholarship (MONBUSHO) to pursue a PhD in Entomology. Owusu successfully completed his PhD in 1995 with a gold medal award (for best PhD candidate) and has researched extensively into insect pests of agricultural and medical importance, as well as carrying out monitoring and evaluation assignments. Owusu has an Executive Master of Business Administration (EMBA Project Management option).

== Career ==
After completing his PhD, Owusu was immediately appointed an assistant professor at Kochi University in April 1995, and then associate professor in September 1995. In March 1996, Owusu was appointed a research fellow at the International Crops Research Institute for the Semi-Arid Tropics (ICRISAT) and was posted to Niger as an entomologist. Significant among his achievements was the development of a system for the management of the millet head miner, Heliocheilus albipunctella (Lepidoptera: Noctuidae) based on indigenous plant species, and the host interactions (semiochemicals and use of resistance varieties).

In 1998, Owusu was appointed lecturer at the then Department of Zoology, University of Ghana (now Animal Biology and Conservation Science). He was promoted to senior lecturer in September 2000 and then to associate professor and then professor in June 2005 and March 2010 respectively. He has mentored several students to obtain their graduate and postgraduate degrees. Owusu has edited several research articles for many journals and authored over a hundred scientific papers in the area of entomology. He has also served as a consultant to many agencies in the areas of pesticide science, pest management, agriculture, and project management, and evaluation.

Owusu served as head of the Department of Animal Biology and Conservation Science, from 2008 to 2010 and followed that with tenure as the vice dean of the Faculty of Science from 2010 to 2014. He also served as the dean of the School of Biological Sciences from August to September in 2014 and acting dean, School of Biological Sciences from September 2014 to June 2015.

Outside the University of Ghana community, he served as country director of KANEMATSU Corporation, Tokyo, Japan (Ghana Office) from July 2001 to December 2004 and country manager, SIRUS Corporation, Tokyo, Japan from 2005 to 2009.

Owusu is touted as a scholar of international repute with proven knowledge and experience in university administration and governance in addition to commendable fundraising ability. In 1999, he was behind the building of a laboratory (Food Security) at the University of Ghana for use by staff and students.

Owusu has served on numerous university boards and committees as well as serving as Hall Tutor of Jean Aka Nelson Hall, the University Teachers Association of Ghana (UTAG) Secretary as well as Editor-in-chief of the Journal of the Ghana Science Association, Regional Editor for the UNESCO African Journal of Science and Technology and a reviewer for a number of other international journals.

=== Vice-chancellor ===
He became the one who would replace former vice-chancellor of the University of Ghana, Ernest Aryeetey, who left office in July 2016. The shortlisted candidates for the position of vice-chancellor included Samuel Agyei Mensah (Provost of the College of Humanities), John Gyapong (pro vice chancellor, research and innovation) and Akosua Adomako Ampofo (former director of the Institute of African Studies).

== Research ==
Owusu has worked extensively on millet, vegetable, and urban insect pests, especially in the areas of insecticide resistance and the use of indigenous plant materials for the management of major insect pests. He has attracted some funds for research, and in 1999, personally built a laboratory (Food Security) at the University of Ghana for use by staff and students. He was solely responsible for the acquisition and installation of a Scanning Electron Microscope (first of its kind in West Africa, worth US$500,000) through a grant from the Government of Japan.

Owusu has served the University of Ghana in various capacities and is a member of numerous boards and committees. Owusu is a member of the University of Cambridge African Research Partnership (CAPREx) team.

In August 2008, Owusu was significantly decorated as a "Living Legend" by the People of Kochi, Japan for his contribution to Science and the Internationalization of Kochi city. In 2010, he was named the tourism ambassador of Kochi Prefecture, Japan. On 29 August 2013, Owusu was awarded the prestigious Japanese foreign ministers commendation award for his immense contributions and outstanding roles in the promotion of friendship between Japan and other countries, and for helping improve the social and economic partnership between the people of Ghana and Japan.

== Post-retirement activities ==
He was appointed by the president of Ghana, Nana Akufo-Addo as the board chair of Energy Commission. He was also appointed the third president of the Presbyterian University College.
