= Tima Kumkum =

Ghanaian TV and radio personality, actress, voice-over artist

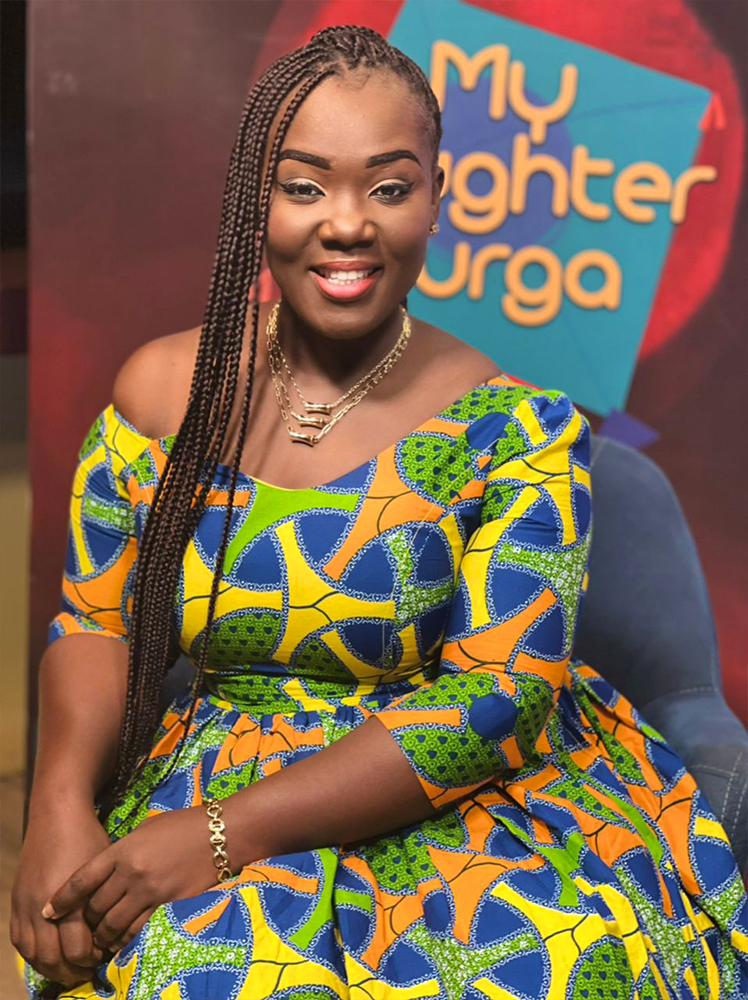
- Born: Cynthia Tima Yeboah; September 17, 1987 (age 38)
- Education: Ghana National College, Institute of Business Management and Journalism, Jayee University College, Ghana Institute of Journalism
- Occupations: Television and radio personality, actress, voice-over artist
- Spouse: Dominic Duodu

Cynthia Tima Yeboah, popularly known as Tima Kumkum (born September 17, 1987) is a Ghanaian television and radio presenter, actress, media practitioner and voice-over artist. She is best known widely as the host of Kumkum Bhagya on Adom TV in Ghana. She was nominated as the TV Female Entertainment Show Host of the Year at the 2019 RTP Awards. Her Aben Show was also nominated as the TV Cooking/Culinary Program of the Year at the 2021 .

== Early life and education ==
Tima was born on Thursday 17 September in Obuasi to Mary Andzi Quainoo and Felix Kwaah Yeboah.

She received her high school education from Ghana National College, where she studied general arts, and continued to the Institute of Business Management & Journalism, where she graduated with a diploma in journalism before topping up with a bachelor's degree in journalism at Jayee University College. She graduated with masters in PR at Ghana Institute of Journalism in 2023. She was also honored as media personality of the year at Africa Arts and Achievers Awards.

== Career ==
She is the host of Aben Show which was aired on AdomTV but now Angel TV.

Tima was honored together with Akumaa Mama Zimbi and Andy Dosty for their influence and impact in Ghana's Showbiz industry at the 2022 Ghana Tertiary Awards.

== Awards ==
- African Tertiary Entrepreneurs Awards (Showbiz Star Foundation of the Year 2018)
- Ghana Outstanding Women Awards (Outstanding Woman Young TV Host 2018)
- Pan African Executives Summit Awards (Multi-Talented Media Personality of the Year 2018)
- Young Professional Role Model Awards (Young Professional Role Model Award in Media Excellence 2020)
- Young Choice Awards 2021 (Youth Favorite TV Personality of the Year 2020)
- Ghana Outstanding Women Awards 2021(Outstanding Woman Radio Personality)
- 2023 Africa Arts and Achievers Awards (Media Personality of the Year)
- 2024 Emerging Entertainers Awards Africa, fifth edition ( Media Personality of the Year)
- Fourth edition of the Center for Africa Corporate Business Honors and Expo Awards ( Media Personality of the Year)

== Ambassador ==
Tima is an ambassador for Slim and Fit GH. She was made Pan African Youth Empowerment Ambassador from 2018 to 2022 for Pan African Executives Summit Awards. She is the brand ambassador for, a Ghanaian chocolate spread and drinks company. Tima was also unveiled as a brand ambassador for Altunsa tomato paste on July 9, 2022.

== Filmography ==
- Asem Asa (2007)
- Aden (2009)
- Madam Moke (2009)
- Mmobrowa (2009)
- Asabea (2009)
- Obra (2009)
- 89 (2010)
- Supremo (2010)
- Sugar (2010)
- Whose Fault (2011)
- Selfie (2017) as Tima Kumkum
- Asantewaa (2019) as Abrafi
- Baby is coming (2020)
- Cross (2021)

== Philanthropy ==
As a philanthropist, Tima founded the Tima Kumkum Foundation where they occasionally make donations including Osu Correction Centre, teenage mothers in Teshie-Nungua, Royal Seed Orphanage, 21-year old fibroid patient, 13-year old rape victim, and others.

== Personal life ==
Tima Kumkum is divorced after five years of marriage with two children. In 2023, she married Dominic Duodu in Oda.

On the 14th of November 2024, Tima Kumkum shared on Instagram her joy of giving birth with her husband Mr Dominic Duodu. She shared her excitement with her followers, introducing the baby boy, Jesse, and expressing thanks for the opportunity to become a parent again.
