= S. K. B. Asante =

Ghanaian lawyer and traditional ruler

Samuel Kwadwo Boaten Asante (SKB Asante) (born 11 May 1933) (not to be confused with Professor Samuel Kingsley Botwe Asante (SKB Asante), the academician) is a Ghanaian lawyer and the Paramount Chief of Asokore Asante in the Ashanti Region. He was an International Arbitrator, and served on the International Court of Arbitration of the International Chamber of Commerce, International Centre for Settlement of Investment Disputes (ICSID).

== Education ==
S.K.B. attended Achimota School and he holds an M.Phil. in African Studies from the University of Ghana. He was a Fellow of Legon Hall and one of its first student residents. He held a JSD from Yale University Law School, 1965; LLM, London University, 1958; LLB, from the University of Nottingham, 1956.

== Academia ==
An Honorary Chancellor of the Graduate School of Governance and Leadership, he was also a visiting professor at University of Ghana.
