= David Kpakpoe Acquaye =

Ghanaian academic and agriculturalist (born 1928)

David Kpakpoe Acquaye FGA
- Born: David Kpakpoe Acquaye; 17 September 1928; Accra, Gold Coast (now Ghana)
- Education: Accra Academy; Michigan State University; University of Aberdeen
- Occupation: Academic
- Known for
- Scientific career
- Fields: Crop Science; Soil Science
- Workplaces: University of Ghana

David Kpakpoe Acquaye (born 17 September 1928) is a Ghanaian academic and agriculturalist. He was a professor of Soil Science and Crop Science, and the first head of the Soil Science department of the University of Ghana.

Acquaye was a member of the Soil Science Society of Ghana, the Soil Science Society of America, the International Soil Science Society, the American Society of Agronomy, and a fellow of the Ghana Academy of Arts and Sciences. He once served as a president of the Association of Faculties of Agriculture in Africa.

== Early life and education ==
Acquaye was born on 17 September 1928. He had his early education at the Accra Royal School from 1936 to 1943. In 1944, he gained admission to study at the Accra Academy, where he graduated in 1948. He continued at the Michigan State University in East Lansing, Michigan, USA in 1952. There, he obtained his bachelor's degree in 1956. In 1957, he proceeded to the United Kingdom to study at the University of Aberdeen, Scotland, where he obtained his doctorate degree in 1960.

== Career ==
After his studies abroad, Acquaye joined the West African Cocoa Research Institute at Tafo, as a Scientific Officer in the field of Soil Chemistry. There, he worked as a research officer until 1965 when he became a senior research officer. A year later, he gained employment at the University of Ghana, where he worked as a senior lecturer. In 1969, he was made the acting head of the Crop Science Department, and the dean of the Faculty of Agriculture in 1972. He was elevated to the status of an associate professor in 1974, and subsequently, professor in 1976.

Acquaye became a member of the International Soil Science Society in 1958, and served as the vice-president of the society from 1963 to 1964. He was president of the Soil Science Society of Ghana from 1966 to 1971 and a scientific editor of the Ghana Journal of Agricultural Science. A journal he had edited since 1971. He was made a member of the American Society of Agronomy in 1973, and elected fellow of the Ghana Academy of Arts and Sciences in 1979.

In 1982, Acquaye became the first head of the Soil Science department which was carved out of the Crop Science Department of the University of Ghana. In 1986, he became dean of the faculty of agriculture at the university for a second occasion before handing over in 1990.

== Personal life ==
Acquaye married Eugenia Na-Oyo Quartey-Papafio in 1961. Together, they had five sons. Acquaye's interests included football, playing table tennis, and reading.
