= Jonathan Narh Ayertey =

Ghanaian entomologist and academic

- Born: Jonathan
- Citizenship: Ghana
- Occupation: entomologist
- Awards: Fellow of the Ghana Academy of Arts and Sciences

Jonathan Narh Ayertey is a Ghanaian entomologist and academic. In

2004 he was inducted as a fellow of the Ghana Academy of Arts and Sciences.
