= Ernest Aryeetey =

Vice-chancellor of the University of Ghana

Ernest Aryeetey FGA
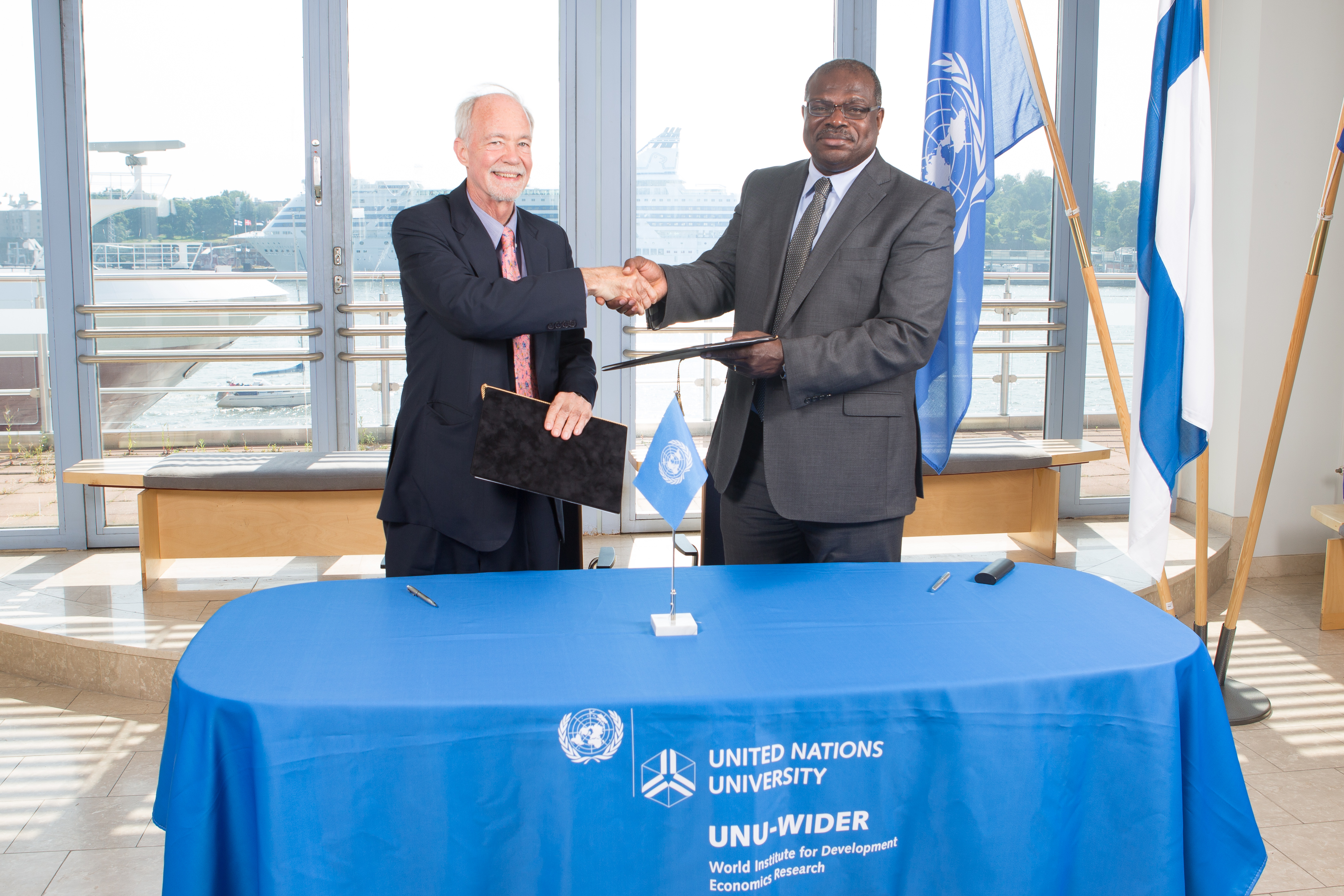
- David M. Malone (left) shaking hands with Ernest Aryeetey (right)

Vice-chancellor of the University of Ghana
- In office 2010–2016
- Preceded by: Clifford Nii Boi Tagoe
- Succeeded by: Ebenezer Oduro Owusu

Personal details
- Born: 19 October 1955 (age 70) Kumasi, Ghana
- Education: Achimota School; Presbyterian Boys’ Secondary School; University of Ghana (B.A.); Kwame Nkrumah University of Science and Technology (M.Sc.); University of Dortmund (Dr.-Ing.)
- Profession: Development economist

Academic work
- Discipline: Development economics
- Institutions: University of Ghana, Legon

Ernest Aryeetey FGA (born 19 October 1955 in Kumasi, Ghana), is an emeritus Professor at the Institute of Statistical, Social and Economic Research (ISSER) at the University of Ghana. Until 31 July 2024, he was the secretary-general of the African Research Universities Alliance (ARUA). He was also previously vice-chancellor of the University of Ghana (2010–2016). Prior to his appointment as vice-chancellor, he was a senior fellow and director of the Africa Growth Initiative at the Brookings Institution, Washington, D.C. He had also been director of ISSER at the University of Ghana for the period February 2003 to January 2010.

== Education ==
Aryeetey was educated at Achimota School (1968–1973) and at the Presbyterian Boys’ Secondary School, Legon (1973–1975).

He studied economics with statistics (1975–1978) at the University of Ghana and took a master's degree in regional planning at Kwame Nkrumah University of Science and Technology, Kumasi (1979–1981) and obtained a PhD (Doktor-Ingenieur) from the University of Dortmund, Germany in 1985. In July 2017, the University of Sussex, UK, awarded Ernest Aryeetey an honorary degree for significant contribution to the study of African economies and to higher education transformation in Africa. Since then, he has received honorary degrees from Lund University, Sweden (2021) Stellenbosch University, South Africa (2022), University of Ghana (2023), University of Health and Allied Sciences, Ho (2023), and University of Glasgow (2024).

Ernest Aryeetey's area of specialisation is development economics. He was elected Fellow of the Ghana Academy of Arts and Sciences in 2009.

== Career ==
After teaching on the Spring Programme at the University of Dortmund for a year, Ernest Aryeetey returned to Ghana in 1986 to start work as a research fellow at the University of Ghana's Institute of Statistical Social and Economic Research (ISSER). He was promoted senior research fellow in 1990, associate professor in 1997 and a full professor in 2000. Ernest Aryeetey taught at the Department of Economics, University of Ghana (1986–1992). He has also been Temporary Lecturer at the School of Oriental and African Studies, University of London (1993); visiting professor at Yale University Department of Economics (1999); and the Cornell Visiting professor, Department of Economics at Swarthmore College (2001–2002).

== Research ==
Ernest Aryeetey's research work focuses on the economics of development with interest in institutions and their role in development, regional integration, economic reforms, financial systems in support of development and small enterprise development. He is very well known for his work on informal finance and microfinance in Africa. He has consulted for various international agencies on a number of development and political economy subjects. He has presented seminar papers at Departments of Economics and Planning in such universities as Ohio State University, the University of Manchester, Oxford University, Harvard University, Yale University, New York University, University of Copenhagen, University of California, Los Angeles, Georgetown University, and Sophia University, Tokyo.

Ernest Aryeetey has published 3 books, 6 edited volumes, 32 journal articles and over 100 conference, working and discussion papers. Among his publications are Financial Integration and Development in Sub-Saharan Africa (Routledge 1998) and Economic Reforms in Ghana: the Miracle and the Mirage (James Currey 2000). His publication with Ravi Kanbur on “The Economy of Ghana Sixty Years after Independence” and published by Oxford University Press in 2017 is one of his best known recent works. He was the second recipient of the Michael Bruno award of the World Bank to become a visiting scholar for May–October 1998.

== Other activities ==
Aryeetey was the president of the Ghana Institute of Planners from 1998 until 2000. He is currently board chairman of the African Economic Research Consortium (AERC), Nairobi. He has been associated with AERC since 1988.

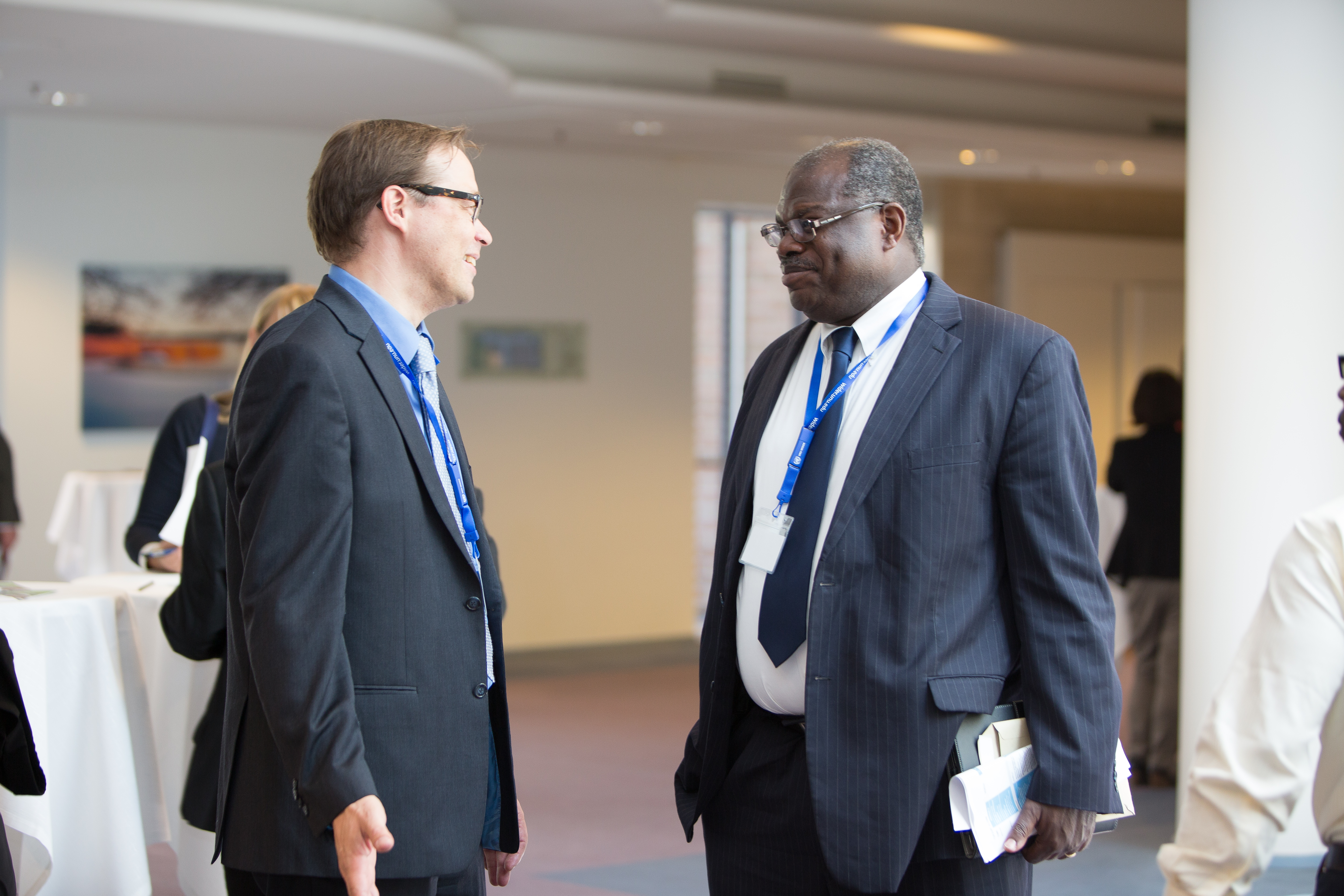
Ernest Aryeetey at UNU-WIDER Conference on Learning to Compete Industrial Development and Policy in Africa

Ernest Aryeetey is Chairman of the Governing Board of Achimota School (since April 2023). He is also a member of the Board of Trustees of the Institute of Development Studies (IDS), Sussex. He is a member of the Board of the International Food Policy Research Institute (IFPRI), Washington DC., and was the chairman of the Board of the United Nations University World Institute for Development Economics Research (UNU-WIDER), Helsinki (2009–2015). In April 2016, he was appointed by United Nations Secretary-General Ban Ki-moon and Director-General Irina Bokova of the United Nations Educational Scientific and Cultural Organization (UNESCO) to the governing council of the United Nations University.

Aryeetey served as a Member of the Board of the Global Development Network (GDN) New Delhi (2004–2009) as well as of the Governing Board of the Centre for Development Research (ZEF) at the University of Bonn, Germany. Until April 2019, he was the board chair of Partnership for African Social and Governance Research (PASGR) in Nairobi, Kenya.

Aryeetey was a Managing Editor of the Journal of African Economies and was also a member of the editorial board of Development Southern Africa and of African Development Review. He was also the editor of the New Legon Observer.

Aryeetey was a non-Executive Director of Barclays Bank Ghana Ltd in 2004–2007. He became a non-Executive Director of Stanbic Bank Ghana Ltd 2010–2021, and was appointed board chair in 2018.

Ernest Aryeetey delivered the 2018 WIDER Annual Development Lectures in Helsinki, where he spoke on “The Political Economy of Structural Transformation: Has Democracy Failed African Economies?”

Ernest Aryeetey was the Priest's Warden of Christ Church at University of Ghana (2003–2009). He served three terms as president of the Old Achimotan Association (OAA) between 2015 and 2022.

== Personal life ==
Aryeetey is married to Ellen Bortei-Doku Aryeetey and has two children, James Nii Armah and Felicia Naa Dedei.

== Selected bibliography ==
=== Books ===
- Aryeetey, Ernest (1985). Decentralizing regional planning in Ghana. Dortmund: IRPUD: Universität Dortmund, Institut für Raumplanung. ISBN 9783882110531.
- Aryeetey, Ernest; Dinello, Natalia (2007). Testing global interdependence: issues on trade, aid, migration and development. Cheltenham, UK Northampton, Massachusetts, USA: Elgar. ISBN 9781845428785.
- Aryeetey, Ernest; Kanbur, Ravi (2008). The economy of Ghana: analytical perspectives on stability, growth & poverty. Oxford Accra, Ghana: James Currey Woeli Publishing Services. ISBN 9781847010032.
- Aryeetey, Ernest; Ackah, Charles (2012). Globalization, trade and poverty in Ghana. Ottawa Accra, Ghana: International Development Research Centre Sub-Saharan Publishers. ISBN 9789988647360.
- Aryeetey, Ernest; Kasekende, Louis; Kanbur, Ravi; Devarajan, Shantayanan (2012). The Oxford companion to the economics of Africa. Oxford New York, New York: Oxford University Press. ISBN 9780199575978.
- Aryeetey, Ernest; Kasekende, Louis; Kanbur, Ravi; Devarajan, Shantayanan (2014). The Oxford companion to the economics of Africa. Oxford New York, New York: Oxford University Press. ISBN 9780198705437.

=== Discussion papers ===
- Aryeetey, Ernest; et al. (1994). Supply and demand for finance of small enterprises in Ghana. Washington, D.C.: World Bank. ISBN 9780821329641.
- Aryeetey, Ernest (2007). The organization of land markets and production in Ghana. Legon, Ghana: Institute of Statistical, Social, and Economic Research University of Ghana. OCLC 185026719.
