= Albert George Baidoe Amoah =

Ghanaian academic

Albert George Baidoe Amoah is a Ghanaian academic. In 2005 he was inducted as a fellow of the Ghana Academy of Arts and Sciences.
