= Kwesi Dickson =

Ghanaian Christian theologian (1929–2005)

Professor Kwesi Abotsia Dickson
- Born: 7 July 1929; Saltpond, Ghana
- Died: 28 October 2005 (aged 76); Accra, Ghana
- Resting place: Winneba, Ghana
- Education: Mfantsipim School; University of Ghana; Mansfield College, Oxford
- Occupations: Academic; Theologian; Priest; Author
- Employer: University of Ghana
- Organization: Methodist Church Ghana
- Notable work: Theology in Africa
- Title: President of the Methodist Church of Ghana
- Term: 1990 – 1997
- Predecessor: Jacob S.A. Stephens
- Successor: Samuel Asante Antwi
- Spouse: Mrs. Cecilia Dickson
- Children: 4
- Relatives: Kwamina B. Dickson (brother)

Notes
- President of the All Africa Council of Churches

Kwesi Abotsia Dickson FGA (7 July 1929 – 28 October 2005) was a Ghanaian Christian theologian. He was the seventh President of the Methodist Church Ghana and a professor at the University of Ghana, Legon.

== Early life and education ==
Kwesi Dickson was born at Saltpond in the Central Region of Ghana. He was educated at the Mfantsipim School at Cape Coast. He completed his basic ministerial training at the Trinity Theological Seminary (then Trinity College in Kumasi) in 1951. He then attended the University of Ghana, then the University College of the Gold Coast. Next he went to the United Kingdom where his postgraduate education was at Mansfield College, Oxford at Oxford University.

== Career ==
Dickson was ordained into the ministry of the Methodist Church of Ghana at the British Methodist Conference of 1957. He served in various capacities at the University of Ghana over three decades until 1989. He has been the Head of the Department for the Study of Religions, Dean of the Faculty of Arts, Master of Commonwealth Hall, the first dean of students and the director of the Institute of African Studies. when he was succeeded by Kwame Arhin.

At various times, he served as adjunct professor of Old Testament and Hebrew at the Trinity Theological Seminary, Legon. He was also a fellow of the Ghana Academy of Arts and Sciences. He was its president on two occasions. He also worked at the University of Swaziland as a visiting professor.

In 1989, he was elected as President of the Methodist Church Ghana. He served two consecutive 4 year terms ending in 1997. He has served as Chairman of the Christian Council of Ghana and as All Africa Conference of Churches President of the All African Council of Churches.

== Hobbies ==
His hobbies contained of tennis and music which mostly included being a pianist.

== Family ==
He was married with four children.

== Death ==
Dickson died at the Korle Bu Teaching Hospital, Accra after a short illness. His funeral and burial were attended by many notable Ghanaian citizens including John Agyekum Kufuor who was President of Ghana at the time and John Atta Mills who was a colleague at the University of Ghana and was to become the next Ghanaian president.

== Publications ==
Kwesi Dickson has many publications to his name. He has authoritative works such as Theology in Africa and others on Religious exclusivism. Some of his texts were also used for GCE Ordinary Level and GCE Advanced Level curricula. Some of his works include the following:

- Williamson, Sydney George; Dickson, Kwesi A (1965). Akan Religion And The Christian Faith A Comparative Study Of The Impact Of Two Religions. Ghana Universities Press. ASIN B0018HTZ96.
- Dickson, Kwesi A. (1968). An introduction to the history and religion of Israel. Darton, Longman & Todd. ASIN B0007IURR6.
- Aspects of religion and life in Africa (The J. B. Danquah memorial lectures). Ghana Academy of Arts and Sciences. 1977. p. 41.
- Dickson, Kwesi A.; Paul Ellingworth (1969). Biblical Revelation and African Beliefs. Lutterworth P. p. 191. ISBN 978-0-7188-1652-0.
- Dickson, Kwesi A. (1970). From Abraham to the Early Days of Israel in the Promised Land (History & Religions of Israel). Darton, Longman & Todd Ltd. p. 164. ISBN 978-0-232-51109-3.
- Dickson, Kwesi A (1969). From Hezekiah to the Return from Exile (History & Religions of Israel). Darton, Longman & Todd Ltd. p. 144. ISBN 978-0-232-51056-0.
- Dickson, Kwesi A (1968). From Samuel to the Fall of the Northern Kingdom (History & Religious of Israel). Darton, Longman & Todd Ltd. p. 144. ISBN 978-0-232-35697-7.
- Dickson, Kwesi A. (1982). Gospel According to Luke. Darton, Longman & Todd Ltd. ISBN 978-0232515565.
- Dickson, Kwesi A (1995). Prohibitions: A study in African traditional education. Macmillan Publishers in association with Unimax Publishers. ISBN 978-9964973100.
- Dickson, Kwesi A (1970). Religions of the world. Ghana Publishing Corporation. ISBN 978-0876760574.
- Dickson, Kwesi A. (1976). Story of the early Church as found in the Acts of the Apostles. Darton, Longman & Todd Ltd. p. 160. ISBN 978-0-232-51333-2.
- Dickson, Kwesi A. (1976). The Human Dimension in the Theological Quest. Ghana Universities Press. p. 18. ASIN B0000EE656.
- Dickson, Kwesi A. (1984). Theology in Africa. Darton, Longman & Todd Ltd. p. 252. ISBN 978-0-88344-508-2.
- Dickson, Kwesi A. (1991). Uncompleted Mission: Christianity and Exclusivism. Orbis Books (USA). p. 177. ISBN 978-0-88344-751-2.

== See also ==
- Alan Stewart Duthie
- Gilbert Ansre

== External links and sources ==
- AASRBulletin

Religious titles
Preceded by Jacob S.A. Stephens	President of the Methodist Church of Ghana; 1990–1997	Succeeded by Samuel Asante Antwi
