= Clifford Nii Boi Tagoe =

Ghanaian academic and physician

Clifford Nii Boi Tagoe OV

Vice-Chancellor of the University of Ghana
- In office October 2006 – July 2010
- Preceded by: Kwadwo Asenso Okyere
- Succeeded by: Ernest Aryeetey

Personal details
- Born: 6 October 1949 (age 76) Accra, Ghana
- Education: St Augustine's College; University of Ghana (MBChB); University of Leicester (PhD)
- Scientific career
- Fields: Anatomy
- Workplaces: University of Ghana Medical School

Clifford Nii Boi Tagoe, OV (born 6 October 1949) is a Ghanaian academic who is the former Vice Chancellor of the University of Ghana. He has been teaching anatomy for over 25 years in Ghana and abroad and in 2000 he became Professor of Anatomy and Dean at the University of Ghana Medical School. In 2005, he became acting vice chancellor of the university. He served for five years and was succeeded in 2010 by Ernest Aryeetey.

== Education ==
Tagoe was born in Accra, Ghana. After his Common Entrance Examination at Richard Akwei Memorial School, he gained admission to St Augustine's College in Cape Coast, where he studied for his 'O'- and 'A'-Level examinations. Tagoe holds a bachelor's degree in Medicine and Surgery (MB., ChB.) from the University of Ghana and PhD in anatomy (1983) from the University of Leicester, UK.

== Career ==
Clifford Nii Boi Tagoe is a past Vice-Chancellor of the University of Ghana, a position he held from October, 2006 to July, 2010. Prior to this he held office as Dean of the University of Ghana Medical School and also Provost of the College of Health Sciences of the University of Ghana. Over the years, he has served on numerous Boards and Committees of the university, and was a member of the University Council between 1995 and 1997.

As Vice-Chancellor, he attended several Higher Education Conferences and presented papers on topics including "Provision and Financing of Higher Education in Africa", "Some Aspects of Intra- and Inter-Regional Cooperation in Africa" and "International Code of Ethics for Higher Education".

He was the current President of the Anatomical Society of West Africa, a Member of the Council of the Association of Commonwealth Universities and a member of the Administrative Board of the International Association of Universities.

In 2008, the Government of Ghana conferred on him the national honour of the Order of the Volta, for services to higher education in Ghana.
