= Immunoparasitology =

Branch of science combining immunology and parasitology

Immunoparasitology is the branch of biomedical science at the intersection of immunology and parasitology that studies the interactions between the immune system of a host organism and parasitic organisms, including protozoa, helminths (parasitic worms), and ectoparasites such as ticks and mites. The discipline examines how hosts recognize and respond to parasitic infection through innate and adaptive immune mechanisms, how parasites evade or modulate these defenses in order to establish and maintain infection, and how this knowledge can be applied to the diagnosis, prevention, and treatment of parasitic diseases.

Because parasitic infections such as malaria, schistosomiasis, leishmaniasis, trypanosomiasis, and various soil-transmitted helminthiases disproportionately affect populations in tropical and subtropical regions and are classified by the World Health Organization among the neglected tropical diseases, immunoparasitology occupies a central position in global health research. Insights from the field have informed the development of diagnostic tests, the search for vaccines against parasitic disease—including the licensed malaria vaccines RTS,S and R21/Matrix-M—and ongoing investigation of parasite-derived molecules as potential immunomodulatory therapies for autoimmune and allergic conditions.

== History ==
The conceptual foundations of immunoparasitology emerged from the broader development of tropical medicine in the late nineteenth and early twentieth centuries. The Scottish physician Patrick Manson, often described as the father of tropical medicine, demonstrated in the 1870s that filarial worms causing lymphatic filariasis were transmitted by mosquitoes, establishing a framework for studying vector-borne parasitic disease. Ronald Ross subsequently confirmed that mosquitoes transmit the malaria parasite Plasmodium between human hosts, work for which he received the Nobel Prize in Physiology or Medicine in 1902. Field observations in malaria-endemic regions during the early twentieth century revealed that people living under conditions of intense transmission gradually acquired partial resistance to disease without ever clearing infection entirely—a phenomenon described as "premunition". This concept of slowly acquired, non-sterilizing immunity remains a central theme in malaria immunology today.

For much of the twentieth century, parasitology and immunology developed largely as separate disciplines: the former concerned chiefly with the classification, life cycles, and epidemiology of parasites, the latter with the cellular and molecular basis of host defense. The two fields converged as techniques for measuring antibody responses, lymphocyte function, and cytokine production became more widely available from the 1960s onward. A major technical advance came in 1976, when William Trager and James B. Jensen developed a method for the continuous in vitro culture of Plasmodium falciparum, the species responsible for the most severe form of human malaria. This culture system allowed researchers, for the first time, to study host–parasite molecular interactions, antigen structure, and immune effector mechanisms under controlled laboratory conditions, and it remains in routine use in malaria research laboratories.

A further conceptual turning point came in 1986, when Tim Mosmann and Robert Coffman described two functionally distinct subsets of mouse CD4+ helper T cells, designated type 1 (Th1) and type 2 (Th2), distinguished by the cytokines they secrete. The Th1/Th2 paradigm gave immunoparasitology a unifying framework: intracellular protozoan infections came to be understood as controlled predominantly by Th1-type responses centred on interferon-gamma, whereas helminth infections were found to characteristically induce Th2-type responses involving interleukin-4, interleukin-5, and interleukin-13. This framework, later extended to incorporate additional T helper subsets and regulatory T cells, continues to shape research into both naturally acquired immunity and vaccine design.

From the 1990s onward, the application of molecular biology, genomics, and, more recently, single-cell and systems-level approaches has allowed immunoparasitology to investigate parasite immune evasion strategies, host genetic susceptibility, and candidate vaccine antigens in increasing detail. This period also saw renewed scientific interest in the relationship between parasitic infection and immune regulation, motivated partly by epidemiological associations between declining helminth exposure and rising rates of allergic and autoimmune disease in industrialized countries.

== Scope and definition ==
Immunoparasitology is distinguished from general parasitology—which is concerned primarily with the taxonomy, life cycles, epidemiology, and pathology of parasitic organisms—by its specific focus on the host immune system and its interaction with the parasite. The field addresses several interconnected questions:

- How do innate and adaptive immune mechanisms recognize and respond to different classes of parasites?
- How do parasites evade, suppress, or redirect host immune responses in order to establish acute or chronic infection?
- What immune mechanisms underlie protection against parasitic infection, and why does this protection so often develop slowly and remain incomplete?
- How do immune responses to parasites themselves contribute to disease pathology (immunopathology), as distinct from the direct effects of the parasite?
- How can knowledge of host–parasite immune interactions be translated into vaccines, diagnostics, and immunotherapies?

Immunoparasitology draws on cellular immunology, molecular biology, genomics, epidemiology, and clinical medicine, and overlaps substantially with vaccinology, immunoepidemiology, and tropical medicine. Because parasites range from single-celled protozoa to large multicellular helminths and arthropod ectoparasites, the field encompasses an unusually broad range of host–pathogen interactions compared with the immunology of viruses or bacteria. The recognition of immunoparasitology as a distinct area of study is reflected in the existence of dedicated peer-reviewed journals, including Parasite Immunology, published continuously since 1979, which is devoted specifically to research on the immune response to eukaryotic parasites.

== Immune response to parasites ==
=== Innate immunity ===
The first line of host defence against parasites consists of physical and chemical barriers—the skin and mucosal epithelia—together with innate immune cells and soluble factors that act rapidly and without requiring prior exposure to a specific pathogen. The complement system can be activated directly by parasite surface molecules through the alternative pathway, leading to opsonization or, in some cases, direct lysis of the parasite. Pattern recognition receptors, including several Toll-like receptors, recognize conserved parasite molecules—such as the glycosylphosphatidylinositol (GPI) anchors found on the surface of Plasmodium and other protozoa—triggering the release of pro-inflammatory cytokines and the activation of downstream immune responses.

Phagocytes, particularly macrophages and neutrophils, engulf and destroy many protozoan parasites, while natural killer cells contribute to early control of intracellular infections such as toxoplasmosis. Against multicellular helminths, which are generally too large to be phagocytosed, the innate response instead relies heavily on eosinophils, mast cells, and basophils, often acting in cooperation with antibody. Eosinophils release cytotoxic granule proteins capable of damaging the helminth tegument, a process enhanced by antibody binding to the parasite surface in a mechanism known as antibody-dependent cellular cytotoxicity.

=== Adaptive immunity ===
Adaptive immune responses to parasites are broadly organized according to the type of parasite involved. Intracellular protozoa, such as Toxoplasma gondii, Leishmania species, and the liver stage of Plasmodium, typically elicit a type 1 (Th1) response, characterized by CD4+ T cells that produce interferon-gamma. This cytokine activates macrophages to kill intracellular organisms and works together with CD8+ cytotoxic T cells that recognize and destroy infected host cells.

Multicellular helminths, in contrast, characteristically induce a type 2 (Th2) response, marked by CD4+ T cells producing interleukin-4, interleukin-5, and interleukin-13. These cytokines drive immunoglobulin E production, expansion of eosinophil and mast cell populations, increased mucus secretion from goblet cells, and enhanced gut smooth-muscle contraction—a combination of effects sometimes summarized as the "weep and sweep" response, which helps to expel intestinal worms. Regulatory T cells and the anti-inflammatory cytokines interleukin-10 and TGF-β limit the intensity of both Th1 and Th2 responses, a process that becomes especially prominent during chronic helminth infection, where it can reduce immunopathology but may also blunt protective immunity and dampen bystander responses to unrelated antigens, including vaccines and allergens.

== Key mechanisms ==
=== Host–parasite interactions ===
The outcome of parasitic infection reflects a dynamic balance between host immune pressure and parasite countermeasures, shaped by the close and often prolonged contact between parasite and host tissue. Parasites occupy diverse niches—intracellular (e.g., Leishmania, Toxoplasma), intravascular (e.g., Plasmodium, Trypanosoma), or extracellular within the gut lumen or tissues (e.g., most helminths)—and the dominant immune effector mechanisms differ accordingly. Genetic diversity in both host populations (for example, variation in human leukocyte antigen genes and the protective effect of sickle cell trait against severe malaria) and parasite populations (for example, antigenic diversity among Plasmodium falciparum strains) further shapes the trajectory and outcome of infection at the population level.

=== Immune evasion mechanisms ===
Parasites have evolved diverse strategies to evade or subvert host immunity, reflecting their long co-evolutionary history with their hosts:

- Antigenic variation: African trypanosomes periodically switch expression of their variant surface glycoprotein (VSG) coat, allowing the parasite population to outpace the host antibody response. Plasmodium falciparum similarly varies expression of the surface antigen PfEMP1, encoded by the large multigene var family, contributing to repeated and chronic infection.
- Molecular mimicry and immunomodulation: Several helminths secrete molecules that mimic host regulatory pathways. Researchers in Rick Maizels' laboratory identified a protein secreted by the mouse intestinal nematode Heligmosomoides polygyrus that structurally and functionally mimics TGF-β, binding host TGF-β receptors and inducing regulatory T cells despite having no sequence homology to mammalian TGF-β.
- Complement evasion: Several parasites express surface proteins that inactivate complement components or recruit host complement regulators to their surface, preventing complement-mediated lysis.
- Intracellular survival: Leishmania and Toxoplasma can persist within host macrophages by interfering with phagosome maturation and modulating macrophage signalling, reducing the killing capacity of the very cells intended to destroy them.
- Induction of regulatory responses: Chronic helminth infection is strongly associated with expansion of regulatory T cells and elevated interleukin-10, producing a state of generalized immune modulation that can persist for the life of the infection and influence host responses to unrelated antigens.

=== Immunopathology ===
In many parasitic diseases, the host's own immune response, rather than the parasite alone, is responsible for much of the associated pathology. In Schistosoma infection, granulomatous inflammation around parasite eggs trapped in the liver and intestine—driven largely by Th2 cytokines—leads to fibrosis that can progress to portal hypertension. In severe Plasmodium falciparum malaria, excessive pro-inflammatory cytokine production together with sequestration of infected red blood cells in the cerebral microvasculature contributes to cerebral malaria. These examples illustrate a recurring theme in immunoparasitology: an effective immune response must be strong enough to limit parasite burden while avoiding excessive immune-mediated tissue damage, a balance that has important implications for both natural immunity and vaccine design.

== Major parasite types studied ==
=== Protozoa ===
- Plasmodium species — cause malaria; alternate between intracellular stages in hepatocytes and erythrocytes; the central focus of malaria vaccine and monoclonal antibody research.
- Toxoplasma gondii — causes toxoplasmosis; a widely used model organism for studying interleukin-12- and interferon-gamma-dependent control of intracellular protozoa.
- Leishmania species — cause leishmaniasis; transmitted by sand flies; a key model for studying macrophage–parasite interactions and the Th1/Th2 balance in determining clinical outcome.
- Trypanosoma brucei and Trypanosoma cruzi — cause African trypanosomiasis and Chagas disease, respectively; notable for extensive antigenic variation (T. brucei) and long-term intracellular persistence (T. cruzi).
- Entamoeba histolytica and Giardia species — intestinal protozoa studied particularly for mucosal immune responses.

=== Helminths ===
- Schistosoma species — blood flukes causing schistosomiasis; extensively studied for granuloma formation and chronic immunopathology.
- Filarial nematodes, including Onchocerca volvulus (the cause of river blindness) and Wuchereria bancrofti/Brugia malayi (causes of lymphatic filariasis) — long-lived parasites associated with pronounced immunomodulatory effects on the host.
- Soil-transmitted helminths, including Ascaris lumbricoides, hookworms (Necator americanus, Ancylostoma duodenale), and Trichuris trichiura — among the most prevalent human parasitic infections worldwide, and the principal targets of mass drug administration and vaccine development programmes.
- Tapeworms (Taenia and Echinococcus species) — studied particularly in relation to the chronic, immunologically tolerated cyst stages of infection.

=== Ectoparasites ===
Ticks, mites, and lice are generally studied less for the immune response they themselves evoke than for the immunomodulatory components present in their saliva or secretions, which can facilitate transmission of the pathogens they vector. Sand fly saliva, for example, has been shown to alter the local immune environment at the bite site in ways that favour establishment of Leishmania infection.

== Applications in medicine ==
=== Vaccine development ===
Translating knowledge of anti-parasite immunity into effective vaccines has proved markedly more difficult than for many viral and bacterial pathogens, owing to the antigenic complexity of parasites, their multi-stage life cycles, and their well-developed capacity for immune evasion. The first vaccine against a human parasitic disease to be recommended for widespread use, RTS,S/AS01, targets the circumsporozoite protein of Plasmodium falciparum and was recommended by the World Health Organization for children living in malaria-endemic regions in October 2021, following more than three decades of development by GlaxoSmithKline and partners. A second malaria vaccine, R21/Matrix-M, developed by the Jenner Institute at the University of Oxford together with the Serum Institute of India using an adjuvant licensed from Novavax, received a WHO recommendation in October 2023. Both vaccines provide partial rather than sterilizing protection, an outcome consistent with the broader observation that naturally acquired immunity to malaria itself develops slowly and is rarely complete.

Vaccine development against helminth infections has focused on diseases such as hookworm infection and schistosomiasis. Candidate recombinant antigen vaccines, including the Na-GST-1 and Na-APR-1 hookworm antigens developed through the Sabin Vaccine Institute's Human Hookworm Vaccine Initiative, have reached early-phase clinical trials. No vaccine against a human helminth infection had achieved regulatory licensure as of the mid-2020s.

=== Monoclonal antibodies ===
An emerging complement to traditional vaccination is the use of long-acting monoclonal antibodies for malaria prevention. Antibodies such as CIS43LS and L9LS, developed by scientists at the Vaccine Research Center of the U.S. National Institute of Allergy and Infectious Diseases, target the circumsporozoite protein on the surface of Plasmodium falciparum sporozoites. In a 2022 phase 1 trial, a single dose of L9LS protected 15 of 17 participants (88%) against infection in a controlled human malaria infection model. A subsequent phase 2 field trial in Mali found that a single dose of L9LS was substantially protective against clinical malaria over a six-month transmission season in children.

=== Diagnostics ===
Immunological principles underpin many parasitological diagnostic tools, including enzyme-linked immunosorbent assays (ELISA) for detecting parasite-specific antibodies or circulating parasite antigens in serum, and antigen-based rapid diagnostic tests, such as those detecting Plasmodium falciparum histidine-rich protein 2 (HRP2), which are widely used for point-of-care diagnosis of malaria in endemic settings.

=== Helminth-derived immunotherapy ===
The pronounced capacity of helminth parasites to modulate host immune responses has prompted investigation of helminths, helminth extracts, or helminth-derived molecules as potential therapies for autoimmune and allergic diseases, an approach sometimes termed "helminth therapy." Clinical trials using Trichuris suis ova in inflammatory bowel disease and other conditions have produced mixed and largely inconclusive results, and no helminth-based immunotherapy has received regulatory approval. The approach remains an active area of investigational research rather than an established clinical treatment.

== Research methods ==
Immunoparasitology employs a wide range of experimental approaches:

- In vitro culture systems, most notably the continuous culture of Plasmodium falciparum developed by Trager and Jensen, which allows direct laboratory study of blood-stage parasites and their interaction with immune effector molecules.
- Animal models, including rodent malaria parasites (Plasmodium berghei, Plasmodium chabaudi, Plasmodium yoelii), murine schistosomiasis (Schistosoma mansoni), and murine models of Leishmania, Trypanosoma, and Heligmosomoides polygyrus infection, which permit genetic and immunological manipulation not feasible in human subjects.
- Flow cytometry and related single-cell techniques used to characterize and quantify immune cell populations and their activation states during infection.
- Immunoassays such as ELISA and multiplexed bead-based assays used to measure antibody and cytokine responses.
- Genomic, transcriptomic, and proteomic approaches, including RNA sequencing of host and parasite material, used to identify candidate vaccine antigens and characterize immune evasion genes.
- Gene editing, including CRISPR–Cas9-based approaches, increasingly used to generate genetically modified parasites for studying the function of specific virulence and immune evasion genes.
- Controlled human infection models (also called challenge studies), in which volunteers are deliberately exposed to malaria parasites under close medical supervision, used to evaluate candidate vaccines and monoclonal antibodies before larger field trials.

== Notable scientists and contributions ==
A number of researchers have made foundational or sustained contributions to immunoparasitology. This list is illustrative rather than exhaustive.

- Patrick Manson (1844–1922) — demonstrated mosquito transmission of filarial worms and is widely regarded as the founder of tropical medicine.
- Ronald Ross (1857–1932) — established that Plasmodium parasites are transmitted between humans by mosquitoes, work recognized with the 1902 Nobel Prize in Physiology or Medicine.
- William Trager (1910–2005) — together with James B. Jensen, developed the continuous in vitro culture system for Plasmodium falciparum in 1976, a technique that remains fundamental to malaria research worldwide.
- Tim Mosmann and Robert Coffman — identified the Th1/Th2 paradigm of helper T cell differentiation in 1986, providing the conceptual framework still used to interpret immune responses to intracellular protozoa versus helminths.
- Alan Sher — researcher at the U.S. National Institute of Allergy and Infectious Diseases whose work helped define the role of interleukin-12 and interferon-gamma in resistance to Toxoplasma gondii and other intracellular parasites.
- David Sacks — NIAID researcher recognized for studies of immune evasion and Th1/Th2 balance in Leishmania infection, including the role of sand fly saliva in establishing infection.
- Rick Maizels — immunologist at the University of Glasgow whose laboratory identified specific helminth-derived molecules, including a parasite protein that structurally mimics TGF-β signalling, that actively suppress host immune responses.
- Judith (Judi) Allen — immunologist at the University of Manchester recognized for defining the distinct, Th2-associated activation state of macrophages induced during helminth infection and its role in tissue repair.
- Eleanor Riley — malaria immunologist whose research has examined the mechanisms and limitations of naturally acquired immunity to Plasmodium falciparum; she has also served as an editor of the journal Parasite Immunology.
- Peter Hotez — physician-scientist at Baylor College of Medicine and, with Maria Elena Bottazzi, a co-developer of recombinant antigen vaccine candidates against hookworm infection through the Sabin Vaccine Institute's Human Hookworm Vaccine Initiative; also a prominent advocate for neglected tropical disease research.
- Adrian Hill — director of the Jenner Institute at the University of Oxford, who led development of the R21/Matrix-M malaria vaccine.

== Current research trends ==
Active areas of research in immunoparasitology include:

- Next-generation malaria interventions, including improved multi-stage vaccine formulations and long-acting monoclonal antibodies such as L9LS, aimed at providing seasonal or year-round protection, particularly for infants and young children in endemic regions.
- Systems immunology, applying combined transcriptomic, proteomic, and metabolomic approaches to map immune responses to infection in detail and to identify correlates of protection.
- Single-cell technologies, used to resolve the heterogeneity of immune cell responses to parasitic infection, including the behaviour of tissue-resident immune populations.
- Helminth-derived immunomodulators, investigated both for their role in natural host–parasite biology and for their potential therapeutic application in inflammatory and allergic disease.
- Structural vaccinology, in which detailed structural information about parasite surface antigens is used to guide the rational design of vaccine immunogens.
- The role of the microbiome in shaping host susceptibility and immune responses to parasitic infection.
- Controlled human infection models for malaria, and increasingly for other parasites, used to accelerate early-phase evaluation of vaccines and antibody-based interventions.

== Challenges and limitations ==
Despite decades of research, immunoparasitology faces a number of persistent challenges:

- Antigenic diversity and variation: Many parasites, including Plasmodium falciparum and African trypanosomes, display extensive genetic and antigenic diversity, complicating the design of broadly effective vaccines and antibody-based interventions.
- Complex, multi-stage life cycles: Parasites often express different antigens at different life-cycle stages and tissue locations, meaning that immunity effective against one stage may not protect against another.
- Incomplete and slowly acquired natural immunity: Naturally acquired immunity to infections such as malaria typically develops only after years of repeated exposure and rarely provides sterilizing protection, limiting the immunological "proof of concept" available to vaccine developers.
- Immune evasion and modulation: The same mechanisms parasites use to evade or dampen host immunity during natural infection can also blunt vaccine-induced immune responses.
- Balancing protection and immunopathology: Immune responses strong enough to control parasite burden can themselves contribute to disease, as in cerebral malaria and hepatic schistosomiasis, so that effective interventions must be protective without becoming pathological.
- Translation from animal models to humans: Much mechanistic work relies on rodent models of infection, which do not fully replicate the genetic diversity, prior immune history, or co-infection burden of human populations in endemic regions.
- Resource constraints: Many of the diseases studied in immunoparasitology disproportionately affect low- and middle-income countries and have historically received comparatively limited research funding relative to their global disease burden, a disparity that has shaped the pace of vaccine and drug development for neglected tropical diseases.

== See also ==
- Parasitology
- Immunology
- Tropical medicine
- Neglected tropical diseases
- Malaria vaccine
- Helminthic therapy
- T helper cell
- Immune evasion
- Host–pathogen interaction
