= Oware (surname) =

Oware is a surname. Notable people with the surname include:

- Fred Oware, Ghanaian politician
- Faustina Oware-Gyekye, Ghanaian nurse leader
- Gifty Oware-Mensah (born 1986), Ghanaian politician
