= Ernest Gaewu =

Ghanaian judge

Justice Ernest Gaewu

Justice of the Supreme Court of Ghana
- Incumbent
- Assumed office 5 April 2023
- Nominated by: Nana Akufo-Addo

High Court Judge
- In office 16 September 2020 – 5 April 2023
- Nominated by: Nana Akufo-Addo

Personal details
- Born: April 18, 1969 (age 56) Ghana
- Children: 3
- Education: Awudome Senior High School; Mawuli School
- Alma mater: University of Ghana; Ghana School of Law
- Profession: Judge

Ernest Yao Gaewu (born on 18 April 1969) is a Ghanaian judge who is in active service at the Supreme Court of Ghana.

== Early life and education ==
Gaewu was born in Ho, but hails from Abotia in the Ho West District of the Volta Region. He attended Awudome Senior High School for his Ordinary Level education and Mawuli School for his Advanced Level education. He then proceeded to the University of Ghana in 1995 to study law. After completing his law degree, he attended the Ghana School of Law and was called to the bar in 2000.

== Career ==
After completing his legal education, Gaewu worked at Mawulorm Chambers in the Volta Region under the leadership of Justice Jones Dotse. In 2009, he became the head of the chamber. From 2012 to 2015, he served as the assistant secretary and then secretary of the Volta Bar, as well as a member of the National Council of the Ghana Bar Association. He was also the Bar's representative at the Volta Prison Council and served for two terms. Gaewu has served on various boards and committees, including the Disciplinary Committee of Volta GFA, the Ho Teaching Hospital Board, the Ho Polytechnic Entity Committee, and the Entity Committee of the University of Health and Allied Sciences. He was also a government appointee of the Ho Municipal Assembly from 2002 to 2004. After working in private practice for about two decades, Gaewu was appointed justice of the High Court.

Prior to his legal practice, Gaewu worked as the managing director of Kwagame Ghana Ltd, a family business, from 1987 to 1995.

=== Political career ===
Whilst in private practice, he was active in partisan politics from 2009 to 2016, serving as a constituency chairman and parliamentary candidate for the New Patriotic Party in the Ho West and Ho Central Constituencies. He resigned on 16 September 2020 which was the same day he was appointed as a High Court Judge.

== Supreme Court Appointment ==
=== Nomination ===
Gaewu was nominated (together with George Kingsley Koomson, Barbara Frances Ackah-Yensu and Samuel Kwame Adibu Asiedu) for the Supreme Court bench by President Nana Akufo-Addo on 4 July 2022 based on the advice of the Judicial Council and in consultation with the Council of State. The president said in a statement to parliament that; "he is fully satisfied that each person is fully qualified, and eminently fit to discharge the functions of justice of the apex court". On 25 July 2022, the speaker of parliament announced the nominations in parliament and referred them to the appointments committee for consideration.

=== Vetting ===
Gaewu was vetted on 19 October 2022 by the vetting committee. However, the caucus argued that Justice Gaewu's previous involvement in partisan politics made him unfit to serve on the Supreme Court's bench. The minority expressed their concerns about the appointment and suggested that other competent and qualified justices could have been elevated instead. Following the vetting, his appointment was made on 24 March 2023 after a vote in confidence by the Parliament and the adoption of the consensual report. Gaewu received 138 "Yes" votes and 134 "No" votes during the approval process.

=== Sworn-in ===
Gaewu was sworn into office as justice of the Supreme Court of Ghana together with George Kingsley Koomson on 5 April 2023 by President Nana Akufo Addo. He became the first judge to be appointed to the Supreme Court directly from the High Court since J. N. K. Taylor in 1980.

== Personal life ==
Gaewu is a Christian and is married with three children.

== See also ==
- List of judges of the Supreme Court of Ghana
- Supreme Court of Ghana
