= Worldwide Universities Network =

Consortium of 24 research-intensive universities

- Abbreviation: WUN
- Formation: 2000; 26 years ago
- Headquarters: Discovery Way, University of Leeds, Leeds, UK
- Members: 23 institutions
- Chair: Nana Aba Appiah Amfo, University of Ghana
- Executive Director: Dawn Freshwater
- Secretary General: Mike Hasenmueller
- Website: wun.ac.uk

The Worldwide Universities Network (WUN) is a non-profit consortium of 23 research-intensive universities founded in 2000. It exists to advance high-impact, worldwide research collaboration and deliver positive impacts to domestic, regional and global communities.

== Members ==
As of 2026, the member institutions are:

Country	Institution
Australia	Griffith University; University of Technology Sydney; University of Queensland
Brazil	Federal University of Minas Gerais
Canada	University of Alberta
Germany	Ruhr University Bochum
Ghana	University of Ghana
Hong Kong	Chinese University of Hong Kong
Japan	University of Tsukuba
Mexico	Monterrey Institute of Technology and Higher Education
Netherlands	Maastricht University
New Zealand	University of Auckland
South Africa	University of Cape Town; University of Pretoria
Switzerland	University of Lausanne
Taiwan	National Cheng Kung University
Thailand	Mahidol University
Uganda	Makerere University
United Kingdom	University of Bristol; University of Exeter; University of Leeds; University of Sheffield; University of York

The network is funded principally by its member universities, which each pay an annual subscription fee.

== Structure ==
WUN is managed by a secretariat that is responsible for the operations, communications, and strategy implementation of the network.

The Partnership Board comprises the Presidents, Vice-Chancellors or Rectors of the member universities and the WUN Executive Director.

- Chair: Professor Nana Aba Appiah Amfo, Vice-Chancellor, University of Ghana
- Vice-Chair: Professor Bill Flanagan, President and Vice-Chancellor, University of Alberta
