= Daniel Adzei Bekoe =

Ghanaian chemist and academic (1928–2020)

Daniel Adzei Bekoe FGA, FPAS, FWAS

Vice-Chancellor of the University of Ghana
- In office 1976–1983
- Preceded by: Alexander Kwapong
- Succeeded by: Kwadzo Senanu (acting)

Personal details
- Born: Daniel Adzei Bekoe; 7 December 1928 Abokobi, Gold Coast
- Died: 5 September 2020 (aged 91) Accra, Ghana
- Education: Achimota College; University College of the Gold Coast / University of London (BSc); University of Oxford (DPhil)
- Occupation: Academic
- Scientific career
- Fields: X-ray crystallography, Chemistry
- Workplaces: University of Ghana

Daniel Adzei Bekoe FGA (7 December 1928 – 5 September 2020) was a Ghanaian chemist and academic. He was Vice-Chancellor of the University of Ghana and also a former president of the Ghana Academy of Arts and Sciences.

== Early life and education ==
Daniel Adzei Bekoe was born on 7 December 1928 to A.S. Adzete Bekoe and Jessie Nadu Bekoe (née Awuletey) at Abokobi. His father was then a teacher at the Abokobi Presbyterian School. His father was transferred to teach at the Teshie Presbyterian School, Salem in 1934 and a year later, Daniel Bekoe began his early education at the school. He completed his early education in December 1942 and was enrolled at Achimota College in January 1943 after passing his Cambridge examinations. In 1947, he was a member of the first batch of students to be enrolled at Achimota for the newly introduced sixth form education. He entered the University of Ghana, then the University College of the Gold Coast as one of the 92 students to be admitted as the first batch of students in the institution in 1948. He was also one of the first residents of the institution's first hall of residence; the Legon hall. In June, 1953 he graduated with First Class honours receiving his University of London special degree in chemistry with subsidiary in Mathematics. He later received his PhD in Chemical Crystallography from the University of Oxford at Balliol College.

== Career ==
He was appointed lecturer of the University of Ghana in 1958. As a lecturer of the University of Ghana, he rose through the ranks to become a senior lecturer and later, professor of chemistry in 1974. While at the university he was appointed master of Legon hall. From 1971 to 1973, he was dean of the faculty of science at the university. He was appointed pro vice chancellor in 1973 and vice chancellor of the university from 1976 to 1983. He spent various periods at the University of Ibadan, Nigeria and also at the University of California, Los Angeles as an advanced research scholar. In 1980, he was appointed president of the International Council of Scientific Unions (ICSU). On 26 September 1983 he was elected as a member of the Pontifical Academy of Sciences, that same year he became a founding fellow of The World Academy of Sciences. He joined UNESCO Regional Office of Science and Technology for Africa in Nairobi, Kenya as its director. In October 1983 he was the UNESCO Representative to Kenya, Mauritius, Seychelles, Somalia, Tanzania and Uganda, he served in this capacity until December, 1985. In January 1986, he became the Regional Director for Eastern and Southern Africa, International Development Research Centre of Canada in Nairobi, Kenya until his retirement in March 1992. From 1978 to 1982 he served on the Council of the United Nations University, Tokyo, Japan. From 1993 to 1996 he was president of the Ghana Academy of Arts and Sciences. In 2003, he played an instrumental role in the founding of the Presbyterian University College. He was a member and subsequently chairman of the Council of State from 2005 to 2008 and also chairman of the Ghana Atomic Energy Commission (GAEC). He was also a member of the Institute of Economic Affairs board of directors.

== Death ==
Daniel Adzei Bekoe died in Accra on 5 September 2020, aged 91.

== Publications ==
- The Crystal Structure of i-Erythritol and its relationships to some derived d and 1 and racemic substances (with Powell, H.M.), Proceedings of the Royal Society, 250 A, pp. 301–15 (1959);
- The Crystal Structure of Tetracyanoethylene (with Trueblood, K.N.), Zeitschrift für Krystallographie, 113, pp. 1–22 (1960);
- The Crystal Structure of the Hexahydrated Calcium Salt of Hexacyanoisobutylene (with Gantzel, P.K. and Trueblood, K.N.), Acta Crystallographica, 22, pp. 657–665 (1967);
- A Re-investigation of the Crystal Structure of Tetracyanoethylene (with Trueblood, K.N.), Abstracts of Bozeman Meeting of the American Crystallographic Association, p. 87 (1964);
- Molecular Structure of Cedrela Odorata Substance B (with Adeoye, S.A.), Chemical Communications, 14, pp. 301–2 (1965);
- The Crystallographic Evidence for the Molecular Structure of Mexicanolide, PhD Thesis of S.A. Adeoye (1967);
- The Crystal Structure of N, N-Diethyldithiocarbamato-triphenylstanne, MSc Thesis of K.A. Woode (1975);
- Hexamethylbenzene-Tetracyamoethylene (1:1) Complex at 113K: Structure and Energy Calculations (with Maverick, E. and Trueblood, K.N.), Acta Crystallographica, B 34, pp. 2777–2781 (1978);
- The Dilemma of the Scientist (Contribution to a Symposium on 'Building an Intellectual Community in Ghana', Proceedings of the Ghana Academy of Arts and Sciences) (1970), pp. 61–4;
- The Energy Problem in Perspective, Proceedings of the Ghana Academy of Arts and Sciences, XIV, pp. 15–24 (1976);
- International Cooperation in Science and Technology for Development Statement on the Symposium, International Symposium on Science and Technology for Development, Singapore, 22–26 January 1979, pp. 7–13;
- Mobilizing Science and Technology to Increase Endogenous Capabilities in Developing Countries, Science, Technology and Society – Needs, Challenges and Limitations (K.H. Standke and M. Anandakrishna, eds.), Pergamon Press (1980), pp. 457–63.

== Honours ==
The Central Science Laboratory of the University of Ghana was named in his honour. He received an honorary D.Sc. from the University of Ghana.
