= Divine Selase Agbeti =

Ghanaian cybersecurity official

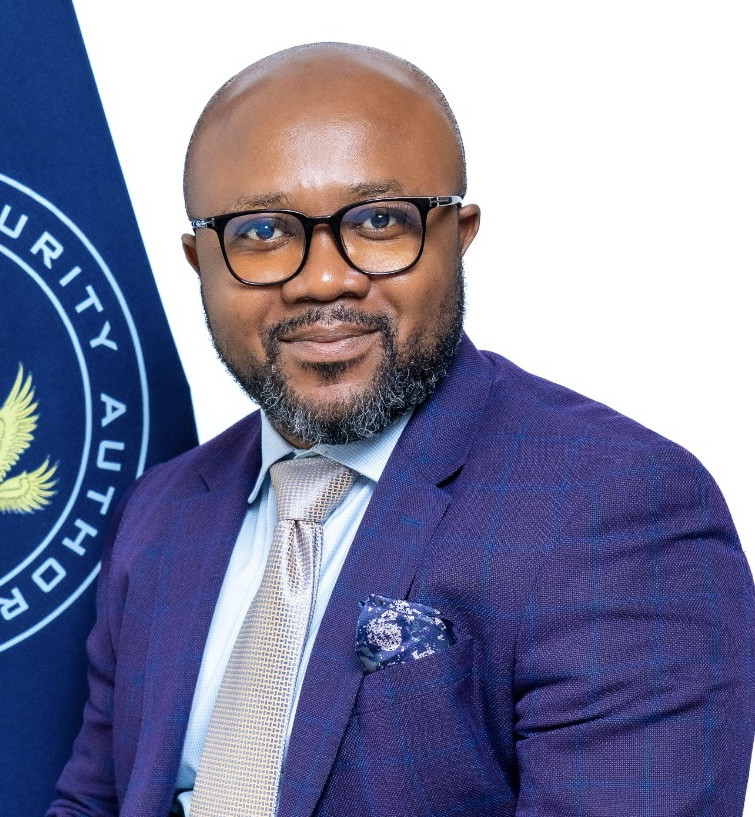

Director-General of the Cyber Security Authority
- Incumbent
- Assumed office March 2025
- President: John Mahama
- Minister: Samuel Nartey George
- Preceded by: Albert Antwi-Boasiako

Personal details
- Born: Divine Selase Agbeti; 28 May 1984 (age 42) Ho, Volta Region, Ghana
- Party: National Democratic Congress
- Education: University of Portsmouth (BA); London School of Economics and Political Science (MSc)
- Occupation: Cybersecurity executive
- Military career
- Branch: British Army
- Service years: 2006–2012
- Conflicts: War in Afghanistan; Iraq War

Divine Selase Kodzo Agbeti (born May 28, 1984) is a Ghanaian cybersecurity professional and public official who has served as the Director-General of the Cyber Security Authority (CSA) of Ghana since March 2025.

== Early life and education ==
Divine Selase Agbeti was born on May 28, 1984, in Ho, in Ghana’s Volta Region, into a family of subsistence farmers. He hails from Gbefi, a suburb of Kpando. He attended Gbefi St. Peter’s L/A Primary School, Tsito Methodist Primary School, and Tsito Old Junior High School, before completing his secondary education at Awudome Senior High School, all located in the Volta Region. After secondary school, Agbeti worked as a basic school teacher and engaged in local community activism.

In 2005, he relocated to the United Kingdom. He later joined the British Army, serving from 2006 to 2012, and was deployed to Afghanistan and Iraq.

Following his military service, Agbeti enrolled at the University of Portsmouth, where he received a bachelor’s degree in International Relations. He received the Prize for Best Dissertation in International Relations and Politics. He subsequently obtained a scholarship to pursue an MSc in International Relations (Research) at the London School of Economics and Political Science. While at LSE, he participated in the year-long Preparing for Future African Leaders (PfAL) programme.

== Career ==
From 2006 till exiting the British army, Agbeti served in an intelligence function.

In 2016, Agbeti joined Barclays as a geopolitical and security intelligence analyst. After three years, he moved into public-sector information security, serving as a governance, risk and compliance (GRC) manager at Hampshire County Council, before stepping down the following year. He subsequently held information security roles at several organisations, including RightCue Assurance, Caplin Systems, the Bank of England, Cognizant, and BP.

In May 2024, he was named Head of Advisory and Cyber Security Lead at the Africa Center for Digital Transformation, a Ghana-based policy and advocacy think tank.

In March 2025, Agbeti was appointed acting Director-General of the Cyber Security Authority of Ghana, the statutory body responsible for regulating cybersecurity activities and coordinating national responses to cyber threats.

Agbeti leads Ghana’s role as Chair of the Africa Network of Cybersecurity Authorities (ANCA). The role involves regional coordination on cybersecurity policy and cooperation among African states. He assumed the role in March 2025 upon taking office as Director-General of the Cyber Security Authority and continues in this capacity following Ghana’s re-election as chair in September 2025.

In October 2025, Agbeti became chair of Ghana’s Joint Cybersecurity Committee after being sworn-in into the committee by President John Dramani Mahama. The committee coordinates national cybersecurity efforts among selected stakeholder instituitions and intelligence agencies. Under the Cybersecurity Act, 2020 (Act 1038), the Director-General of the Cyber Security Authority presides over the committee and serves as its chair.

== Political involvement ==
Agbeti is a member of the National Democratic Congress. In 2023, he contested the party’s parliamentary primaries for the Kpando Constituency in the Volta Region ahead of Ghana’s 2024 general elections. Media coverage identified the constituency as one of the competitive races in the region, with Agbeti listed among the key contenders.
