= Gyekye =

Gyekye is a surname. Notable people with the surname include:

- Emmanuel Gyekye Tanoh (born 1925), Ghanaian lawyer
- Faustina Oware-Gyekye (fl. 1999), Ghanaian nurse leader
- Kwame Gyekye (1939–2019), Ghanaian philosopher
