= Archbishop Porter Girls' Senior High School =

Archbishop Porter Girls' Secondary School
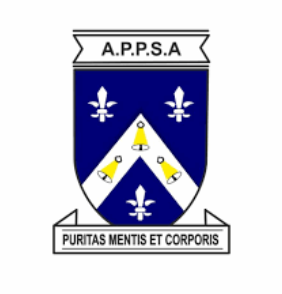
- Archbishop Porter Girls' Senior High School logo

Location
- Fijai; Takoradi, Western Region, 233; Ghana; 4.941459°N 1.748635°W

Information
- Former name: St. Louis Secondary School; Archbishop Porter Girls
- School type: Senior secondary school Girls School
- Motto: Latin: Puritas Mentis Et Corporis (Purity of Mind and Body)
- Religious affiliation: Catholicism
- Established: 1965; 61 years ago
- Founder: His Grace John Kwadjo Amissah
- Sister school: St. John's School, Sekondi
- Headmistress: Mrs. Charlotte Asiedu-Musa
- Gender: Girls
- Classes offered: Business, General Arts, General Science, Visual Arts, Home Economics
- Houses: Aggrey, St. Louis, St. Jude, Ferguson, Marian, Lady Teresa, Joseph Mary, Sterlin Ndoum, John Kwadjo Amissah, Naana Biney
- Colours: Beige and brown
- Slogan: Ladies Of Substance
- Nickname: Porter bells
- Address: P.O. Box 241, Sekondi Takoradi

The Archbishop Porter Girls' Senior High School (abbreviated as APGSHS) is a Catholic senior secondary school for girls, located in Takoradi in the Western Region of Ghana. The female second cycle institution operates within the Ghana Public Education System. It was founded in 1965 by Rev. Kodjo Amissah with the name St. Louis Secondary School, which was later changed to Archbishop Porter Girls. It welcomes girls of all religious denominations. The school is situated on a hill in Fijai, Takoradi and it has come to be known as the "Hill of Tranquility" for its peaceful and serene academic atmosphere.

== Courses ==
- General Arts
- General Science
- Home Economics
- Business
- Visual Arts

== History ==
The school was established in 1965 by Archbishop John Kwadjo Amissah, the then Archbishop. The first Ghanaian Headmistress was Marian Andoh-Kesson.

== Achievements ==
- In 2007 the school won the Western regional round of the i2CAP-"I Too Can Program" computer programming competition.
- In 2011 the school was adjudged the best school in the Western region based on the results of the West African Examination Council.
- In 2013, the school was adjudged winner of the 'Project Citizen' showcase in Ghana which required high school students to address major issues concerning the country.
- In 2017, the school represented Ghana in the annual World Robotics competition in the United States.
- In 2021, the school was crowned the 2021 National Science and Maths Quiz Western Zonal Champions.

== Notable alumni ==
There are different alumni groups for this school. Old students of Archbishop Porter Girls Senior High School in the United Kingdom are known as The Archbishop Porter Past Students Association in the UK (APPSA UK).

- Nana Aba Appiah Amfo, linguist and the Vice-Chancellor of the University of Ghana.
- Ama Ampofo, actress and model.
- Millicent Clarke, Regional Human Resources Director – Africa & Middle East for Standard Chartered Bank.
- Joselyn Dumas, television host and actress
- Yvonne Nduom, wife of Paa Kwesi Nduom, the leader of the Progressive People's Party in Ghana.
- Zita Okaikoi, a politician and a former Minister for Tourism.
- Adowarim Lugu Zuri, entrepreneur.
