= Adowarim Lugu Zuri =

Ghanaian entrepreneur

- Born: Paga, Ghana
- Education: University of Ghana
- Occupation: entrepreneur
- Organizations: Wazuri Ghana Limited

Adowarim Lugu Zuri is a Ghanaian entrepreneur who is involved in coconut selling, a heavily male dominated field in Ghana. She is the founder and manager of Wazuri Ghana Limited, a company that produces and sells coconuts at a large scale. She was listed as one of WomanRising's 100 Most Outstanding Women Entrepreneurs in Ghana in 2016.

== Early life and education ==
Zuri was born in Paga in Upper East Region of Ghana but later moved to Accra with her family. She had her senior high education at Archbishop Porter Girls Secondary School in Tarkoradi, and graduated from the University of Ghana in 2016 with a bachelor's degree in Consumer Science.

== Career ==
In her first year in tertiary school, Zuri at the age of 18 had to combine her studies with the business of selling sachet water. She later expanded her business activities to include the selling of clothes to students in her school. An encounter with a coconut seller who worked around her father's office inspired her to move into coconut selling, which she found to be lucrative. Zuri later founded Wazuri Enterprise before she turned 20. Wazuri Enterprise has so far provided employment for more than twenty Ghanaian youths.
