= Turkish think tanks =

Turkish think tanks are relatively new, but such think tanks provide research and ideas, yet they play less important roles in policy-making when compared with American think tanks. Many of them are sister organizations of a political party or a company. There are very few university think tanks.

== List ==
- 21st Century Turkey Institute; based in Ankara, undertakes research and projects on a large scale; from Turkish Foreign Policy to regional politics and geostrategy.
- Evrim Ağacı is an atheist-nationalist organization centered in Ankara.
- 3H Movement is a liberal think tank and a young organization centered in Istanbul.
- Türkiye Tanıtım Araştırma Demokrasi ve Laik Oluşum Vakfı
- Ankara Center for Crisis and Policy Studies (ANKASAM)
- Ankara Strategy Institute is an Ankara-based independent think-tank organization established in 2011. It is distinguished from other think-tank organizations in Turkey with its analysts being all academicians.
- Institute of Turkish Studies
- Center for Middle Eastern Strategic Studies
- Association for Liberal Thinking is a libertarian think-tank centered in Ankara.
- Atatürkist Thought Association
- Center for Political Research (SİYASAM)
- Sümer Halk Oyunları Topluluğu Gençlik Ve Spor Kulübü Derneği
- Association for the Support of Contemporary Life
- Bahcesehir University Center for Economic and Social Research (Betam) was founded with the goal of establishing a tradition rooted in scientific research, and of becoming a universally accepted research platform. Betam consists of two main units. In the Economic Research Unit, it focuses on the research and development of economic policy in Turkey and abroad from a comparative perspective. In the Social Sciences Research Unit, it concentrates on the cultural, social and political structure of Turkey and its international relations.
- Centre for Alternative Policies (APM) (Turkish: Alternatif Politikalar Merkezi). Based in Ankara, Turkey. Undertakes research and projects on economic and foreign policy and good governance.
- Center for Eurasian Strategic Studies (ASAM) (Turkish: Avrasya Stratejik Araştırmalar Merkezi). The first known think-tank in Turkey. It has close ties to Turkish diplomacy, and it is the parent organisation of the Institute for Armenian Research (EREN).
- Centre for Policy and Research on Turkey (Research Turkey) Established in 2012 in London, United Kingdom.
- Center for Strategic Communication (STRATIM) is an independent think tank founded in 2008 working on Turkish and regional foreign policy issues. Since 2009, STRATIM has organised The Istanbul Forum.
- Center for Turkey's Economic and Strategic Studies (TESAM) is an independent think tank, established in 2008. Undertakes research and projects on Turkey's history, international relations, strategy and foreign policy as well as economic and cultural issues.
- DergiPark It is a website that provides free hosting and publishing services for academic and refereed journals in Turkey in electronic environment since 2013, by ULAKBİM, a subsidiary of TÜBİTAK.
- The Center for Turkish Studies is the "Zentrum für Turkeistudien" where multidisciplinary expertise in business, culture, economics, foreign affairs, history, language, national security, politics, religion, sociology and sustainable development brings about a comprehensive study of the Turkic region. CTS places higher education on the cutting edge with policy implementation and public service.
- Education Reform Initiative (ERI) (Turkish: Eğitim Reformu Girişimi) was launched within Sabancı University in 2003 with the aim of improving education policy and decision-making through research, advocacy, and training. ERI mobilizes a wide range of stakeholders in participatory education policy processes in pursuit of its mission of “quality education for all”. Education Reform Initiative was ranked in The 2013 Global Go To Think Tank Index.
- Foreign Policy Institute
- Freedom Research Association is an Ankara-based policy think tank with a mission to help consolidate liberal institutions in Turkey. Recently founded, the think tank brings together distinguished political scientists, legal scholars and journalists to publish original research and make an impact on public policy.
- Global Policy and Strategy is a non-profit organisation and an independent think tank that conducts scholarly research and analyses, together with delivery of training and consultancy services.
- Global Political Trends Center also known as GPoT Center is a liberal research unit at Istanbul Kultur University.
- Orient-Institut Istanbul
- Istanbul Policy Center (IPC) is a political and economic think tank in Istanbul affiliated with Sabancı University. It has multiple projects and has broad focuses on climate change, democratization, education, EU relations, US relations, and Middle East relations.
- Istanbul Institute of Political Strategy. Established in 2022, dedicated to conducting research in political theory, national security, international relations, and ideology research.
- Institute for Armenian Research (EREN) (Turkish: Ermeni Araştırmaları Enstitüsü). Privately-funded organisation, created by the Center for Eurasian Strategic Studies (ASAM).
- International Strategic Research Organization (USAK) is an Ankara-based liberal think-tank established in 2004. An umbrella organization with 9 research centres, it has close ties with Turkish diplomacy, military, and political circles. It is sponsored by the business world and member donations.

Milli Görüş Vakfı is a centre-right foundation with academic personnel: Oğuzhan Asiltürk, Mehmet Recai Kutan, Temel Karamollaoğlu, İlyas Tongüç, Salih Turhan, Hamdi Sürücü, İbrahim Nedim Titiz, Tacettin Çetinkaya, and Atik Ağdağ. Dr. Karin Yeşilada was appointed to the Board of Educators. Yeşilada is a full-time lecturer for intercultural literary studies and taught at Universities in Marburg, Istanbul, Cologne, Munich, Paderborn and Bochum. In the past Karin was lecturer for the German Academic Exchange Service at Marmara University. The Milli Görüş Movement (or the "National Vision Foundation") is active in nearly all European countries and also countries like Australia, Canada and the United States.

- S.E.S.A.R. (Turkish: Siyasi, Ekonomik, Sosyal Araştırmalar ve Strateji Geliştirme Merkezi). Implicated in the Ergenekon investigation, with its chief, İsmail Yıldız, jailed.
- SETAM - Center for Strategic Economic Social Research Established in 2010.
- SETA is a conservative policy think-tank based in Ankara. Close to the government. Established in 2006.
- Strategic Outlook Konya-based think tank. Established in 2011.
- Turkish Asian Center for Strategic Studies (TACSS)
- T.A.S.A.M. is Istanbul-centred and nationalist.
- Turkish Economic and Social Studies Foundation (T.E.S.E.V.) is a liberal research centre in Istanbul. Close to the business circles, yet less effective in political circles.
- Turkish Think Tank (TTT) Making sense of Turkey for non-Turkish audiences
- Economic Policy Research Foundation of Turkey (TEPAV) is a liberal research centre based in Ankara. Close to business circles, particularly chambers of commerce. Undertakes research and projects on economic and foreign policy and good governance.
- T.U.R.A.N.S.A.M. is a Konya-centred right-wing nationalist think-tank, established in 2007. It defends Turkish Nationalism and Turanian Ideological Holy Union of World Turks. Close to the military and National Action Party's ideologies. Radical Islamic and Turkish Nationalist Think-Thank Organisation, NGO, Thought Producer Organisation. Founder President is Dr. Elnur Hasan MIKAIL (Ph.D. in History), he's also an Expert in an International Relations with the M. Sc. Degree in IR branch, born in old Sovietski street-Yasamal, Baku city, Republic of Azerbaijan. He immigrated to Turkey when he was 18 years old and since that date he lives in Turkey. He's a writer of 4 scientific books one of them written in English.
- Turkish Centre for International Relations & Strategic Analysis (TURKSAM). Ankara-centred nationalist think tank, established in 2004. Close to the military and Nationalist Action Party circles.
- T.U.S.A.M. is Ankara-centred. Leftist nationalist. Close to the ultra-nationalist military circles.

Following Turkish Foreign policy vectors and priorities, these centers cooperate with the Balkans, Central Asia and Middle East Think-Tanks. SETA and SDE are involved in the “ThinkTank cooperation” project implemented by the government program, which is conducted by Turks Abroad governmental body coordinating the activity of Turkish diaspora and the Associated Societies state department. TASAM also conducts some steps in this direction with the support of Turkish Foreign Affairs Ministry. According to Nuh Yilmaz, executive of SETA’s Washington office, they are funded by businessman, who are in trade with the Balkans and Middle East countries. In recent years, issues on media, science, education, human rights, Turkish diaspora, security and defense are in the focus of the center’s research.

- Turk DEGS is a strategy centre operating in the field of international relations, international law and maritime studies. The centre defines its goal as "identifying, defending and developing Turkey's rights and interests within the framework of international law".
- USTAD - International Strategic Analysis and Research Center Mardin-centred democratic-liberal think tank, established in 2011.
- Wise Men Center for Strategic Studies (BİLGESAM) Established in 2008, the Wise Men Center for Strategic Studies (BILGESAM) is one of the leading think tanks in Turkey. As a non-profit, non-partisan organization BILGESAM operates under the guidance of a group of well-respected academics from different disciplines, retired military generals and diplomats; and aims to contribute regional and global peace and prosperity. Closely following the domestic and international developments, BİLGESAM conducts research on Turkey's domestic problems, foreign policy and security strategies, and the developments in neighboring regions to provide the Turkish decision-makers with practical policy recommendations and policy options.
- TEDMEM was established in 2012 as a part of the Turkish Education Association (Türk Eğitim Derneği). TEDMEM is a think-tank, aspiring to provide evidence-based research data, and produce new ideas and publications proactively.
