= George Kingsley Koomson =

Ghanaian judge

Justice George Kingsley Koomson

Justice of the Supreme Court of Ghana
- Incumbent
- Assumed office 5 April 2023
- Nominated by: Nana Akufo-Addo

Appeal Court Judge
- In office August 2020 – 5 April 2023
- Nominated by: Nana Akufo-Addo

High Court Judge
- In office March 2008 – August 2020
- Nominated by: John Kufuor

Personal details
- Born: May 1962 (age 63) Ghana
- Education: Winneba Senior High School; St. Augustine's College, Cape Coast
- Alma mater: University of Ghana; Ghana School of Law
- Profession: Judge

George Kingsley Koomson is a Ghanaian judge who serves as an active justice of the Supreme Court of Ghana.

== Early life and education ==
Koomson was born in May 1962 in Agona Nyakrom in the Central Region of Ghana. He received his primary and middle school education at the Assin Fosu DC school and later attended Winneba Senior High School from 1976 to 1981 for his O Levels. He then proceeded to St. Augustine's College, Cape Coast from 1981 to 1983 for his A Levels.

After completing his A Levels, Koomson was unable to immediately pursue higher education due to the closure of public universities in Ghana in 1983. He however completed his sixth form National Service at Assin Basefo Ningo, a village close to Assin Fosu, where he taught in a primary school and in Form 1. Public universities in Ghana reopened in 1984, and Koomson enrolled in the University of Ghana to study law, graduating with an LLB in 1987. He then proceeded to the Ghana School of Law, where he obtained his Bar qualification in October 1989.

== Career ==
After completing his National Service at the Ministry of Local Government, Koomson joined the Attorney General's department as an Assistant State Attorney in November 1990, where he was initially posted to Cape Coast. In 1994, he was promoted to the position of State Attorney and later transferred to the Drafting Division of the Attorney General's Department in Accra. He resigned from the Attorney General's Department after six months and entered private practice with Michel's Barton and Partners until 2000 when he was appointed a circuit judge.

Koomson was first posted as a Circuit Judge to Akyim Swedru, where he worked for five years before being transferred to Takoradi for three years. In March 2008, he was appointed a High Court Judge and was posted to Wa, where he served until 2010. In July 2010, he was transferred to the Kumasi High Court and served in that capacity until 2013 when he was appointed to the Accra Commercial Court. He served in the Accra Commercial Court until August 2020 when he was appointed as a justice of the Appeals Court of Ghana.

== Supreme Court Appointment ==
Koomson was nominated by President Akufo-Addo in consultation with the Judicial Council and the Council of State on 4 July 2022. He name together with three others (Ernest Gaewu, Barbara Frances Ackah-Yensu, and Samuel Kwame Adibu Asiedu) were announced before parliament by the Speaker of parliament Alban Bagbin and referred to the appointments committee for consideration.

Koomson was vetted on 18 October 2022 by the appointments committee. Following his vetting, a group consisting of victims and families of victims of the Ejura killings submitted a joint memorandum on 20 October 2022 to petition the Appointments Committee of Parliament against confirming the nomination of Justice Kingsley Koomson to the Supreme Court of Ghana. The group alleged that Justice Koomson lacked the necessary independence of thought, moral conviction, and integrity to support his nomination to the Supreme Court due to his role in the Koomson Committee, which investigated the killings. The group further invited the Appointments Committee and Parliament to consider their concerns when evaluating Justice Koomson's nomination.

Koomson's approval was withheld by the appointments committee as minority MPs claimed he had not been in the Appeals Court for long and added that there were other judges who were more competent. On 24 March 2023 his approval was confirmed through a secret balloting process by parliament. Koomson received 139 "Yes" votes and 133 "No" votes during the approval process.

Koomson was consequently sworn into office as justice of the Supreme Court of Ghana together with Ernest Yao Gaewu on 5 April 2023 by President Nana Akufo-Addo.

== See also ==
- List of judges of the Supreme Court of Ghana
- Supreme Court of Ghana
