= Albert Antwi-Boasiako =

Ghanaian former public official

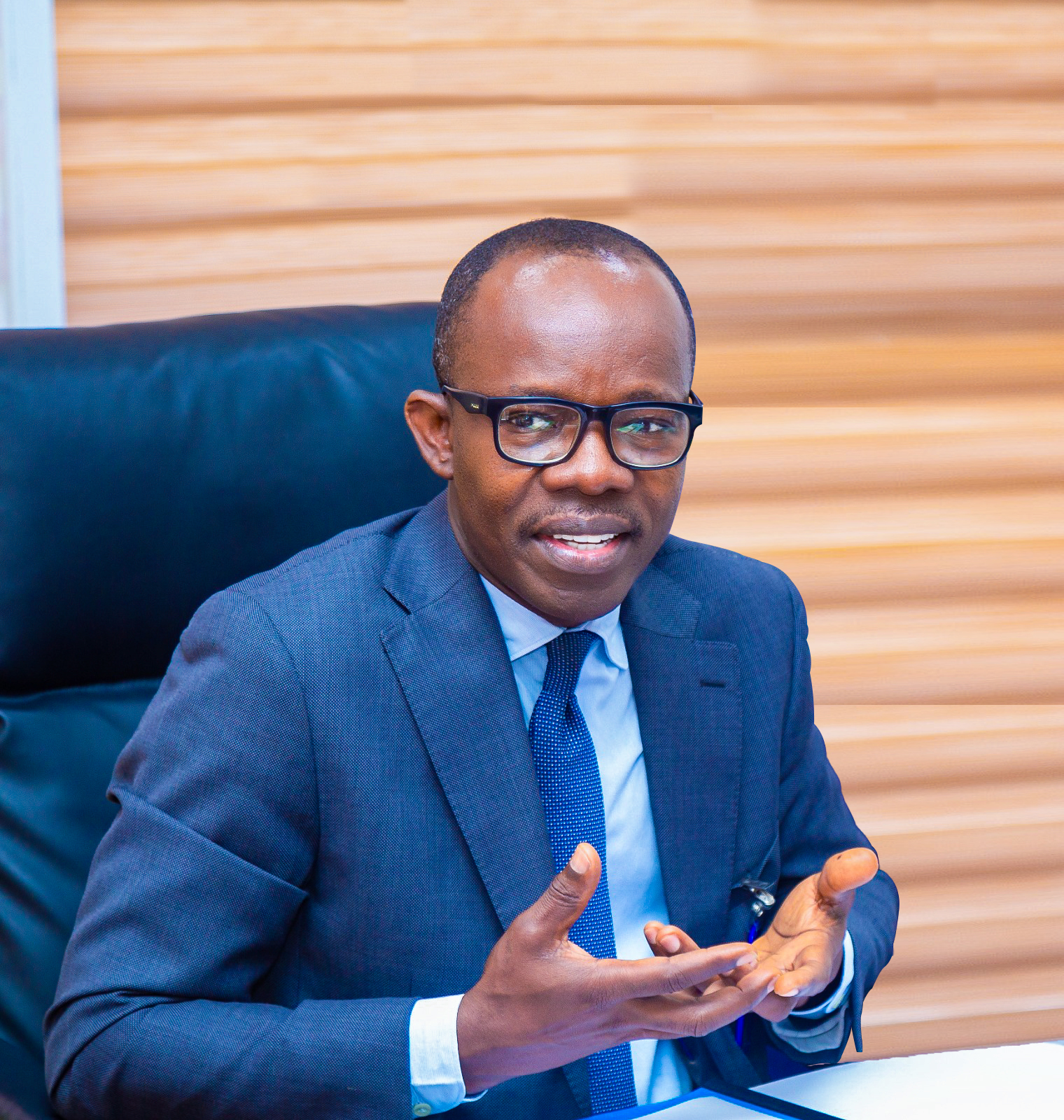

Director-General, Cyber Security Authority
- In office October 2021 – March 2025
- President: Nana Akufo-Addo
- Minister: Ursula Owusu-Ekuful
- Preceded by: Office established
- Succeeded by: Divine Selase Agbeti

Head of the National Cyber Security Centre
- In office 2018 – October 2021
- Minister: Ursula Owusu-Ekuful

National Cybersecurity Advisor
- In office July 2017 – October 2021
- Minister: Ursula Owusu-Ekuful
- Preceded by: Office established
- Succeeded by: Office abolished

Personal details
- Born: Akim-Bieni, Eastern Region, Ghana
- Education: University of Trento (BA); University of Portsmouth (MS); University of Pretoria (PhD)
- Occupation: Cybersecurity expert, author

Albert Antwi-Boasiako is a Ghanaian cybersecurity expert, author, and former government official who served as the founding Director-General of the Cyber Security Authority (CSA) of Ghana from 2021 to 2025. Previously, he held public office as National Cybersecurity Advisor from 2017 to 2021.

During his time in public service, Antwi-Boasiako played a central role in building Ghana’s cybersecurity regulatory framework, leading the development and operationalisation of the Cybersecurity Act, 2020 (Act 1038) and strengthening institutional capacity. He also served as the inaugural Chair of the African Network of Cybersecurity Authorities (ANCA). After leaving public office, he returned to the private sector as executive chairman of e-Crime Bureau, a digital forensics firm he founded.

== Early life and education ==
Albert Antwi-Boasiako was born to Albert Yaw Broni Antwi and Janet Brako. He hails from Akim-Bieni in the Eastern Region. His early upbringing and schooling was in Anyinam, a nearby town also in the Eastern Region.

Antwi-Boasiako attended Oda Senior High School. He completed his undergraduate studies in Philosophy at the University of Trento in Italy. In 2009, he enrolled in a postgraduate programme in forensic and information technology at the University of Portsmouth in the United Kingdom, graduating in 2010. From 2012 to 2018, he pursued a PhD at the University of Pretoria in South Africa. During this period, he introduced the Harmonised Model for Digital Evidence Admissibility Assessment (HM-DEAA), a framework for standardising digital forensics.

During the time of his postgraduate studies in the UK, Antwi-Boasiako got a role in cybersecurity as a consultant with DFLabs for the Europe, Middle East, and Africa (EMEA) market. He represented the Milan-headquartered DFLabs at conferences in the UK and U.S.A. in this period.

== Early career and e-crime Bureau ==
In 2011, Antwi-Boasiako founded e-Crime Bureau, Ghana’s first private digital forensics and cybercrime investigation laboratory. The company introduced structured computer forensics services in Ghana and worked with law enforcement agencies, financial institutions, and corporate organisations.

In 2011, Antwi-Boasiako also took up the position of an adjunct lecturer in cybercrime, cyberterrorism & cybersecurity at Kofi Annan International Peacekeeping Training Centre. In 2014, he became an adjunct lecturer in digital forensics for the postgraduate programme in forensic science at the Kwame Nkrumah University of Science and Technology.

In 2013, he facilitated the first-ever ministerial-level engagement between Ghana and the Council of Europe. The next year, he beaun serving as an expert with the Council of Europe’s Global Action on Cybercrime Extended (GLACY+) Project. In 2015, he moderated a session of the Octopus Conference organized by the Council of Europe.

In 2014, Antwi Boasiako was the country project coordinator in Ghana for the Commonwealth Cybercrime Initiative, a capacity-building initiative of the Commonwealth Internet Governance Forum, whose launch was attended by President John Mahama.

In 2015, Antwi-Boasiako became a member of the Interpol Global Cybercrime Expert Group, contributing to international cybercrime cooperation.

== National Cybersecurity Advisor ==
In June 2017, Antwi-Boasiako was appointed Cyber Security Advisor to the Ministry of Communications, a role created to coordinate national cybersecurity policy and institutional response to cyber threats. The next year, Ghana’s National Cybersecurity Awareness Programme (Safer Digital Ghana) got launched in a ceremony with the attendance of Vice President Mahamudu Bawumia.

During the period he served as advisor, he led Ghana’s technical efforts for the ratification of the Budapest Convention. He led the launch of the cybercrime/cybersecurity incident reporting points of contact in 2019.

In August 2020, following Ghana’s nomination to the Independent Advisory Committee of the Global Internet Forum to Counter Terrorism, he began serving as a member of the committee.

Antwi-Boasiako, serving as National Cybersecurity Advisor, led the development of the Cybersecurity Act, 2020 (Act 1038), which established the Cyber Security Authority as Ghana’s principal cybersecurity regulator. The Act further provides that the Authority is to be headed by a Director-General responsible for its administration and operational oversight. The Act was passed by the 7th Parliament of Ghana on 6 November 2020.

== Director-General of the Cyber Security Authority ==
=== Appointment ===
Following the passage of the Cybersecurity Act, 2020 (Act 1038), Antwi-Boasiako was nominated by President Nana Akufo-Addo and appointed in October 2021 as the first Director-General of the Cyber Security Authority, with responsibility for establishing the Authority and enforcing national cybersecurity regulation.

=== Tenure ===
Antwi-Boasiako has stated that the Authority operated without political interference during his tenure, allowing it to carry out its regulatory mandate independently.

In July 2022, he was sworn-in as chairperson of the Joint Cybersecurity Committee, an inter-agency body tasked with coordinating the country's cybersecurity initiatives.

In 2023, under his leadership, the CSA implemented a licensing and accreditation framework for cybersecurity service providers and professionals, aimed at professionalising the sector and curbing unregulated operations.

In June 2023, Antwi-Boasiako participated in the signing of the Second Additional Protocol to the Convention on Cybercrime (Budapest Convention) at the Council of Europe headquarters in Strasbourg, France. The protocol aims to strengthen international cooperation in cybercrime investigations, particularly in the sharing of electronic evidence. With the support of the Council of Europe, Antwi-Boasiako supported judicial capacity-building initiatives, including cybersecurity training programmes for judges in Ghana.

In October 2024, Antwi‑Boasiako played a key role in launching Ghana’s revised National Cybersecurity Policy and Strategy framework. During his tenure, Ghana recorded significant progress in the International Telecommunication Union Global Cybersecurity Index (GCI), attaining Tier 1 (Role Modelling) status in 2024—the highest ranking category. The country was ranked among the top performers globally and second in Africa, reflecting substantial improvements in its legal, technical, and institutional cybersecurity frameworks.

=== ANCA role ===
In 2023, Ghana’s Cyber Security Authority was elected to chair the African Network of Cybersecurity Authorities (ANCA) making Antwi-Boasiako its inaugural chair. The role focused on strengthening continental cooperation on cybersecurity governance.

== Return to e-Crime Bureau ==
In March 2025, Antwi-Boasiako was replaced as Director-General of the Cyber Security Authority with Divine Selase Agbeti. This replacement terminated his public service duties.

In December 2025, Antwi-Boasiako was appointed executive chairman of e-Crime Bureau, where he provides strategic oversight and focuses on cybersecurity innovation and digital forensics development.

== Publications ==
Antwi-Boasiako is the author of The Ten Commandments for Sustainable National Cybersecurity Development – Africa in Context: Practical Lessons and Good Practices, a book that examines key principles for sustainable national cybersecurity development in Africa, drawing on Ghana’s cybersecurity initiatives from 2016 to 2024 as well as comparative practices from other jurisdictions.

He also authored The Republic: A Professional Journey, Ghana’s Cybersecurity and the Making of a Role Model Country, a work that chronicles nearly 15 years of Ghana’s cybersecurity evolution and institutional reforms, blending memoir, policy insights and strategic analysis.

== Honours and recognition ==
In April 2022, Antwi-Boasiako delivered the keynote address at the 12th College of Basic and Applied Sciences (CBAS) Lecture Series at the University of Ghana. In October 2024, he was invited to deliver an address to the graduating students of the University of Trento.

In January 2025, the Accra Chapter of ISACA honoured Antwi-Boasiako with a "Trailblazer Award" for his role in the development of cybersecurity in Ghana. The award was presented at a seminar organised on 24 January 2025 in Accra. In February 2025, he was awarded the African Cybersecurity Excellence Award by the Africa Network of Cybersecurity Authorities.

In October 2025, after exiting public office, the Cyber Security Authority honoured Antwi-Boasiako for his role in shaping Ghana’s digital security framework and institutionalising national cybersecurity governance.
