= Samuel Kwame Adibu Asiedu =

Ghanaian judge

Justice Samuel Kwame Adibu Asiedu

Justice of the Supreme Court of Ghana
- Incumbent
- Assumed office 28 December 2022
- Nominated by: Nana Akufo-Addo

Justice of the Court of Appeal
- In office 18 December 2019 – 28 December 2022
- Nominated by: Nana Akufo-Addo

Justice of the High Court
- In office 22 November 2006 – 18 December 2019
- Nominated by: John Kufuor

Personal details
- Born: 9 April 1966 (age 60) Ghana
- Education: City Secondary and Business College; Accra Academy
- Alma mater: University of Ghana; Ghana School of Law; Ghana Institute of Management and Public Administration; Swansea University
- Profession: Judge

Samuel Kwame Adibu Asiedu is a Ghanaian judge. He is an active Justice of the Supreme Court of Ghana. He has been on the bench in Ghana since 1996 and became a Supreme Court judge in 2022.

== Early life and education ==
Asiedu was born on 9 April 1966 in Accra. His primary education began in 1971 at the Seventh Day Adventist (SDA) Primary School in Koforidua, and in 1972 moved to the Kaneshie North 3 and 4 Local Authority Primary School. In 1975, he enrolled at the Methodist Primary School in Mangoase, where he remained for a year prior to entering Universal Academy Preparatory School in Bubuashie. He studied there from 1976 until 1979. That same year, he gained admission to the City Secondary and Business College, where he obtained his Ordinary level certificate in 1983, and then proceeded to the Accra Academy, where he obtained his Advanced level certificate in 1985.

Asiedu gained admission to the University of Ghana in 1987, where he studied for his Bachelor of Laws degree (LLB) and graduated in 1990. That same year, he continued at the Ghana School of Law and graduated in 1992 with the Sam Okudzeto Prize for the best student in Legal Accountancy. From 2009 to 2011, he studied Public Administration at the Ghana Institute of Management and Public Administration (GIMPA), and a year later, he studied International Maritime Law at the University of Swansea. He obtained his Master of law degree (LLM) from the university in 2013.

== Career ==
Following his secondary education, Asiedu had his National Service at Kinbu Junior Secondary School from 1985 to 1986. He later joined K. E. Wood and Company as an Auditing Clerk where he worked from 1986 to 1987. After his call to the bar in 1992, he had his post-tertiary National Service at Legal Aid/Oyirifie Chambers in Koforidua.

In 1994, he joined the Commission on Human Rights and Administrative Justice (CHRAJ) as a Legal Officer. He joined the Judicial Service of Ghana in 1996 where he began working as Magistrate until 2002 when he became a Circuit Court judge. He became a justice of the High Court in 2006 adjudicating at the Fast Track (Automated) High Court in Accra and the Commercial Court in Accra. He worked in this capacity until 2019 when he was appointed justice of the Court of Appeal of Ghana.

Between 2016 and 2018, he doubled as an adjunct lecturer of Wisconsin University and Central University. While serving on the bench of Appeals Court, he worked as a Senior Lecturer of the Ghana School of Law from 2020 until his appointment to the Supreme Court bench in 2022.

Asiedu has been a member of the Association of Magistrates and Judges since 1996, a member of the Institute of Taxation, Ghana until 2016, and the Ghana Bar Association from 1992 until 1996. He has also been a resource person of the Judicial Training Institute since 2016.

== Supreme Court appointment ==
On 4 July 2022 President Nana Akufo Addo, based on the advice of the Judicial Council and in consultation with the Council of State nominated Asiedu, along with three other judges (George Kingsley Koomson, Barbara Frances Ackah-Yensu and Ernest Yao Gaewu) for the Supreme Court. On 25 July 2022, the speaker of parliament announced the nominations in parliament and referred them to the appointments committee for consideration.

On 19 October 2022, Asiedu was vetted by the appointments committee, and on 7 December 2022, the appointments committee recommended his approval together with Barbara Frances Ackah-Yensu, to parliament. The committee's report cited "knowledge of the law", "character" and "competence" as attributes of both Ackah-Yensu and Asiedu. The committee reported Ackah-Yensu and Asiedu's pledge to eschew partisanship in their rulings also as a reason for recommendation in their report. On 11 December 2022, the Parliament of Ghana unanimously approved his nomination. After his approval, Speaker of parliament, Alban Bagbin commented that the two nominated judges should have been on the Supreme Court long ago. Bagbin further questioned why Justice Asiedu was in the High Court from 2006 to 2019 and remarked that "...the progress was so slow at the bench. I just could not imagine it and he never went for anything apart from excellence".

Asiedu was sworn into office by President Nana Akufo-Addo on Wednesday 28 December 2022.

== See also ==
- List of judges of the Supreme Court of Ghana
- Supreme Court of Ghana
