= Awudome Senior High School =

High school in Tsito, Ghana

Coordinates: 6.5506°N 0.2990°E

- Tsito, Volta Region; Ghana

Information
- Type: Secondary/High school
- Established: 1963 (63 years ago)
- Grades: Forms [1-3]
- Enrollment: 2,432
- Nickname: AWUSCO
- Website: http://awudomeshs.org/

Awudome Senior High School (AWUSCO) is a second cycle institution located in Tsito in the Ho West District in the Volta Region of Ghana. As of 2022 the headmaster of the school is Courage Meteku.

== History ==
The school was established as a community school in September 1963 by the Tsito Native Teachers Association with about 60 students. In 2010, the headmaster of the school was Mr. Cyprian K. Otti. Currently the Headmaster is Mr. Courage Meteku In 2020, the headmaster of the school was Mr. Amu Emmanuel Komla. In 2021, the school took part in the National Science and Maths Quiz where they contested against Mawuli School, Hohoe E.P Senior High School and Three Town Senior High School. Currently, the school has a population of about 2,432 students.

== Achievement ==
In 2018, the school won the Volta Regional Science and Maths Quiz.

== Notable alumni ==
- Divine Selase Agbeti
- Agnes Dordzie
- Ernest Gaewu
