= Francis Agbodeka =

Ghanaian academic and writer (1931–2005)

Francis Agbodeka FGA
- Born: Francis Agbodeka; 31 December 1931; Anloga, Volta Region, Gold Coast
- Died: 29 October 2005 (aged 73)
- Occupations: Academic, historian
- Spouse: Esther Tamakloe

Academic background
- Education: Achimota School
- Alma mater: University of Ghana

Francis Agbodeka FGA (31 December 1931 – 29 October 2005) was a Ghanaian academic and writer. He was a professor of history at the University of Cape Coast, and the first person to obtain a doctorate degree from the University of Ghana.

== Early life ==
Agbodeka was born at Anloga in the Volta Region of Ghana (then Gold Coast) on 31 December 1931 to his father Dumega Amuzu Agbodeka and mother Vincentia Agudu.

From 1947 to 1952, Agbodeka attended Achimota College for his secondary education, and from 1953 to 1956 he studied at the University of Ghana (then the University College of the Gold Coast), where he was awarded a Bachelor of Arts degree from the University of London. (The University College of the Gold Coast was then a constituent college of the University of London, which meant that the University College of the Gold Coast was unable to award its own degrees.) In 1969, while teaching at the University of Cape Coast, he obtained a doctorate degree in history from the University of Ghana, the first person to obtain a doctorate degree from the university.

== Career ==
Agbodeka began his career as a teacher at Adisadel College, Cape Coast. He taught the sixth-form students A-level History from 1956 to 1960. He was later employed by the University of Cape Coast in 1962 to teach history.

Agbodeka served in various capacities at the University of Cape Coast, including a period as Head of the History Department from 1971 to 1980. He also doubled as Dean of the Faculty of Arts on two occasions. He first served at the helm of faculty from 1971 to 1972, and later from 1974 to 1976. From 1974 to 1978, he was the Pro Vice-Chancellor.

Agbodeka moved to Nigeria in 1978, following his term as Pro Vice-Chancellor of the University of Cape Coast. In Nigeria, he was put in charge of the History Department of the University of Sokoto (now Usmanu Danfodiyo University) for one year. He later moved to the University of Benin, where he worked as a professor of history from 1980 to 1986.

Agbodeka was a member of the Ghana Academy of Arts and Sciences, and also a member of the Historical Society of Ghana.

== Personal life ==
In 1956, Agbodeka married Margaret Liko Nyomi. Together, they had three children. He later married Esther Tamakloe and together, they also had three children.

In August 2005, Abgodeka was reported ill. He died on 29 October 2005.

== Publications ==
Agbodeka authored many books and articles as an academic, among which are:

- The Rise of the Nation States (1965);
- African Politics and British Policy in the Gold Coast, 1868–1900 (1971);
- Ghana in the Twentieth Century (1972);
- Achimota in the National Setting (1977);
- An Economic History of Ghana (1992);
- A History of the University of Ghana (1998);
- The West African Examinations Council (1952–2002) (2002);
- A Handbook of Eweland (three volumes) (1997–2005).

== See also ==
- List of Ghanaian writers
