= Akilagpa Sawyerr =

Ghanaian academic (born 1939)

Akilagpa Sawyerr FGA
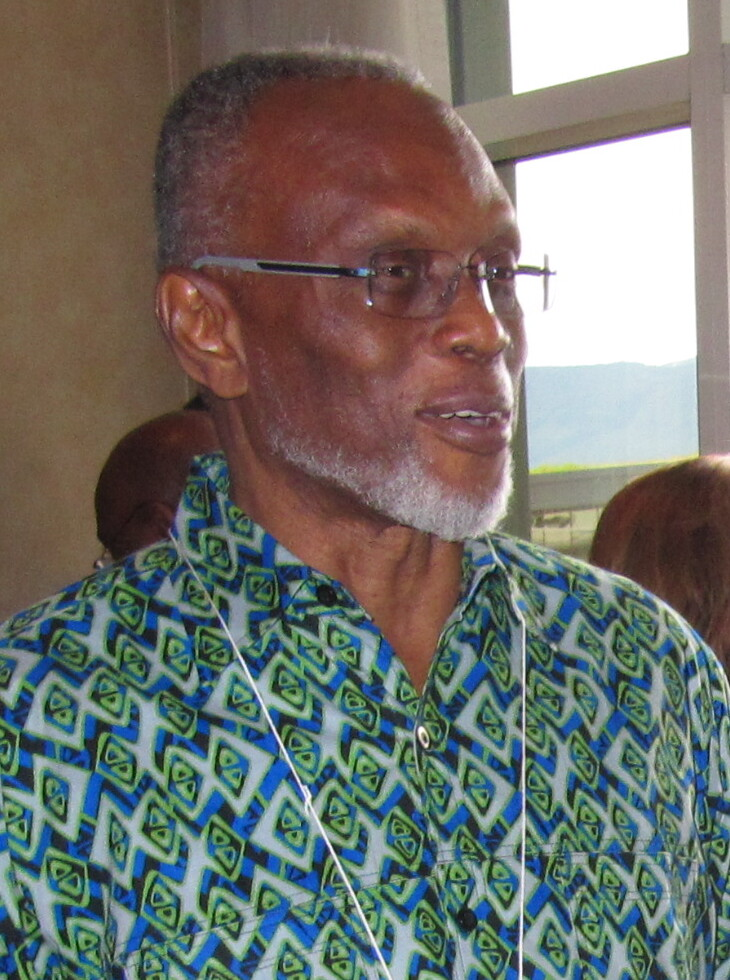
- Professor Akilagpa Sawyerr at Ghana's Honorary Consul

Vice-Chancellor of the University of Ghana
- In office 1985–1992
- Preceded by: Kwadzo Senanu (acting)
- Succeeded by: George Benneh

Personal details
- Born: George Akilagpa Sawyerr; 24 March 1939 (age 87) Gold Coast
- Education: Achimota School; University of Durham (LLB); University of London (LLM); University of California, Berkeley (JSD)
- Occupation: Academic

Academic work
- Discipline: Law
- Institutions: University of Dar Es Salaam; University of Ghana; University of Papua New Guinea

George Akilagpa Sawyerr, FGA (born 24 March 1939) is a Ghanaian academic. He is a professor in the field of law and has served in various universities in Ghana and abroad. He is a former vice-chancellor of the University of Ghana and also a former president of the Ghana Academy of Arts and Sciences.

== Early life and education ==
George was born on 24 March 1939 to lawyer Akilagpa Sawyerr and Charlotte Amy (née Mettle) Sawyerr.

He attended Achimota School, where he received his Cambridge Certificate in 1956 and his Cambridge Higher Certificate in 1958. He studied at the University of Durham for his bachelor of laws degree (LL.B). He received his Master of Laws degree (LL.M) from the University of London and the University of California, Berkeley. He received his doctorate in Juridical Science (JSD) from the University of California, Berkeley, in 1972.

== Career ==
Akilagpa joined the teaching faculty of the University of Dar Es Salaam in 1964 as lecturer and later on a senior lecturer. In 1969 he was appointed director of the university's research center, a position he held until 1970. He moved to Ghana that same year and was employed at the University of Ghana as a lecturer at the faculty of law. In 1979 he worked as a professor of law at the University of Papua New Guinea. He worked there until 1985 when he was appointed vice-chancellor of the University of Ghana. He served in that capacity until 1992. In 1993 he was appointed director of research for the Association of African Universities, rising to the position of Secretary-General of the Association from 2003 to 2008. In 2015, he was elected president of the Ghana Academy of Arts and Sciences.

== Publications ==
Akilgpa has authored many books, chapters and articles that have been published in journals. His interest are mostly focused on legal matters and higher education in Africa. Some of his books include:

- The Student Loans Scheme: Two Decades of Experience in Ghana (2001)
- The Politics of Adjustment Policy (1988)
- Challenges Facing African Universities: Selected Issues (2002)
- The Political Dimension of Structural Adjustment Programmes in Sub-Saharan Africa (1990)
- The Doctrine of Precedent in the Court of Appeal for East Africa (1971)

== Award and legacy ==
In 2018 he was conferred an honorary Doctor of Letters (D. Litt, Honoris Causa) degree by the University of Cape Coast.

The road stretch from the roundabout to the campus of the University of Ghana was named in his honour.

== Personal life ==
He is married to Judith Sara Quitkin. Together they have two children. His hobbies include tennis.
