= Kris Senanu =

Business executive

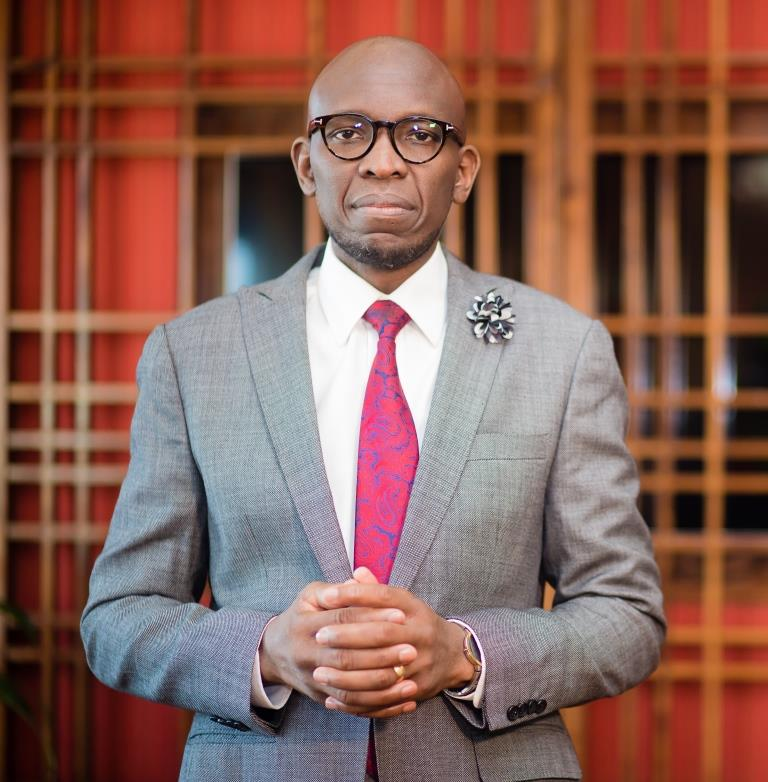
- Born: Kris Senanu; July 12, 1973 (age 53); Accra, Ghana
- Education: USIU-A, Warwick University
- Occupation: Business Executive
- Title: Chief Enterprise Business Officer, Enterprise Business Unit, Safaricom PLC

Kris Senanu is a Kenyan businessman who previously served as the Chief Enterprise Business Officer at Safaricom between June 2021 to May 2022. Prior to this he was managing director of Telkom Digital. As of 2007, Kris was the youngest Telco executive to run a listed ICT company.

He was instrumental in the startup of Access Kenya (now Internet Solutions) and successfully helped it to become the first listed ICT firm on the Nairobi Securities Exchange. He then helped to expand the business's footprint into East Africa and steering its acquisition by Dimension Data in 2014, before exiting as its Deputy CEO, in 2016.

== Early life and education ==
Kris Senanu is a son of the academic Kwadzo Senanu.

Kris Senanu attended the USIU-A, attaining an undergraduate degree in International Business Administration, majoring in marketing and a graduate degree (MBA) in Strategic Management from Warwick University's Business School.

== Career ==
He previously served as the Chief Enterprise Business Officer at Safaricom between June 2021 to May 2022. In 2001, he assisted in co-founding the AccessKenya Group, becoming the company's Chief Operating Officer in 2005, and subsequently its managing director. In 2014, AccessKenya Group was acquired by Internet Solutions (IS), with Senanu becoming its deputy CEO. In 2016 he joined Telkom Kenya as managing director, Enterprise Division.

Kris is also the Chair of the United States International University Council. Other past and present Chairmanships he holds include: the Governing Council at the Kenya Institute of Management, the Chair of the Pan African agency BTL Africa, headquartered in Ghana, and Mdundo which is a pan African music platform.

Kris is a fellow of both the Chartered Institute of Marketing and the Kenya Institute of Management.

== See also ==
- Telkom Kenya
