= Kwadwo Owusu =

Professor Kwadwo Owusu is a Ghanaian climate scientist. He is a professor at the University of Ghana, where he is the Director of the Centre for Climate Change and Sustainability Studies at the University.
