= Elizabeth Frances Sey =

First female graduate of the University of Ghana

- Born: 27 April 1927
- Died: 1991 (aged 63–64)
- Monuments: Elizabeth Sey Hall, University of Ghana
- Education: University of Ghana
- Occupation: Educationist
- Known for: First female graduate of the University of Ghana

Elizabeth Frances Baaba Sey (née Biney) (April 21, 1927 – 1991) was the first female graduate of the University of Ghana. After attending the Achimota Secondary School in Accra, she was admitted to what was then the University College of the Gold Coast, now University of Ghana, in 1950 and graduated with a BA degree in 1953.

After graduating she became the Education Officer for Sekondi. She was Head of the English Department at Achimota School until retiring in 1987. In addition, she served on the Board of Governors of the Ghana International School until her death. She taught at a number of schools including Wesley Girls’ High School, Cape Coast; Saint Louis Secondary School in Kumasi; and Achimota School in Accra. The University of Ghana named a 400-room residence hall Elizabeth Sey Hall in 2011, in her honor to commemorate her contributions to the school.

Her husband was Samuel Sey, Chairman of the Barclays Bank Ghana Limited and also Chairman of the Council of the University of Ghana. He died on 10 April 1991. They had two children.
