= Kwadzo Senanu =

Ghanaian academic (1933–2020)

Kwadzo Ebli Senanu
- Born: Jonathan Kwadzo Senanu; 27 July 1933; Agbozume, Gold Coast
- Died: 21 May 2020 (aged 86)
- Occupation: Academic
- Spouse: Ivy Degbor (m. 1968)

Academic background
- Education: Accra Academy
- Alma mater: University College of the Gold Coast B.A. University of Cambridge B.A., M.A. Carnegie Institute of Technology Ph.D

Academic work
- Institutions: University of Ghana & Moi University
- Main interests: English language

Kwadzo Ebli Senanu (born Jonathan Kwadzo Senanu, 27 July 1933 – 21 May 2020) was a Ghanaian academic in English literature. Originally, a teaching member of the University of Ghana, he served as Pro-Vice Chancellor of the university from 1981 to 1983 and as acting Vice-Chancellor from 1983 to 1985.

== Early life and education ==
Kwadzo Ebli Senanu was born on 27 July 1933 at Agbozume in the Volta Region of Ghana.

Senanu attended the Agbozume Some National School for elementary education. He was educated at Accra Academy from 1947 to 1951. In 1952, he entered the University College of the Gold Coast. He was a pioneer resident of the university's Legon Hall. He won the English Travelling Exhibition in 1954 and was awarded the Gurrey Prize for original composition in 1955. In 1957, he graduated with a first in English and obtained the B. A. degree of the University of London. That same year, Senanu entered Downing College, Cambridge. In 1959, he received from Downing a B. A. degree and started studies for an M. A. degree at Downing which was completed whilst at Yale University in 1964. A year later in 1965, he received his doctoral degree from Carnegie Institute of Technology.

== Career ==
He was first appointed lecturer at University of Ghana in 1960 and made a senior lecturer from 1967 to 1971. He became a Schofield Fellow at Christ's College, Cambridge in the United Kingdom from September 1971 to October 1972. He was a visiting senior lecturer at the University of Ibadan, Nigeria from 1975 to 1977. In 1977 he was made associate professor and became the first African head of the English department at the University of Ghana. He served as an editor of Universitas, an inter-faculty journal at the University of Ghana.

In 1978, Senanu and Theo Vincent (later to be vice chancellor of University of Port Harcourt) published an anthology of poems titled A Selection of African Poetry.

In 1981, Senanu was appointed pro-vice chancellor of the University of Ghana and served until September 1983, when he assumed the role of acting vice chancellor of the university. Senanu was Chairman of the Committee of Vice-Chancellors (now Vice Chancellors Ghana) for the 1983/84 academic year, as acting vice-chancellor of University of Ghana. He was replaced as pro-vice chancellor in 1983 by mathematician Daniel Afedzi Akyeampong and in 1985 as acting vice chancellor by law professor Akilagpa Sawyerr.

Senanu visited and became a life member of Clare Hall, Cambridge, beginning in October 1985. In 1986 he returned to teaching at the University of Ghana and left the university in 1988.

In 1988, Senanu joined Moi University in Kenya as Professor of Social, Cultural and Development Studies staying on at the university until 1997.

He returned to Ghana and served as chairman of the council of the University of Cape Coast from 1997 to 1999. He was a consultant to the Ghanaian government on preparing a draft Technical and Vocational Education Policy from 2000 to 2001.

In 2016, he was the external judge for the Nigeria Prize for Literature.

== Personal life ==
Kwadzo Ebli Senanu was married to Ivy Degbor in 1968. He died on 21 May 2020. He was the father of businessman, Kris Senanu.

== Publications ==
- A Selection of African Poetry edited with Theo Vincent and published by Longman.
- Creative use of Language in Kenya edited with Drid Williams and published by Jomo Kenyatta Foundation, 1995.
