= Alexander Kwapong =

Ghanaian academic and university administrator

Alexander Adum Kwapong FGA

Vice-Chancellor of the University of Ghana
- In office 1966–1975
- Preceded by: Conor Cruise O'Brien
- Succeeded by: Daniel Adzei Bekoe

Personal details
- Born: Alexander Adum Kwapong; 8 March 1927 Gold Coast
- Died: 9 August 2014 (aged 87) Accra, Ghana
- Occupation: Academic

Academic background
- Education: Achimota College; University of Cambridge (BA, PhD)

Academic work
- Discipline: Classics
- Institutions: University of Ghana

Alexander Adum Kwapong, FGA (8 March 1927 – 9 August 2014) was a Ghanaian classicist. He was Vice Chancellor of the University of Ghana from 1966 to 1975, a position which he was the first Ghanaian to hold. Much of Kwapong's research was on the history of Africa in Greco-Roman times, including his Cambridge doctoral dissertation about the relations between locals and colonists in ancient Libya.
