= CSA Ghana =

Cybersecurity Authority Ghana

Cyber Security Authority
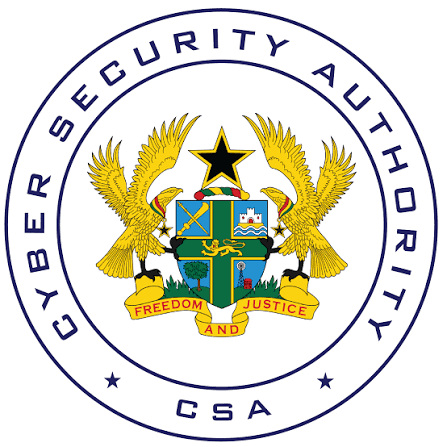

Agency overview
- Jurisdiction: Government of Ghana
- Headquarters: 3rd Floor, NCA Tower, 6 Airport By-pass Road, Accra,Ghana
- Website: www.csa.gov.gh

The Cyber Security Authority (CSA), or the Cybersecurity Authority Ghana, is a government security entity in Ghana which focuses primarily on regulating cybersecurity activities in the country. It started operations on 1 October 2021.

== Mandates ==
The CSA is under the Ministry of Communication in Ghana and is responsible for regulating cybersecurity activities in the country, preventing, managing and responding to cybersecurity threats and cybersecurity incidents in the country.

== History ==
The authority was set up as the National Cyber Security Secretariat (NCCS), and was established by the Cybersecurity Act, 2020 (Act 1038)

In 2025, the CSA launched a Safer Digital Ghana Campaign to sensitise the public on good cyber hygiene practices. On November 28, 2023, the authority was elected to lead the African Network of Cybersecurity Authorities (ANCA), a body established by Smart Africa to improve cybersecurity coordination across the African continent.

Ahead of the Ghana general elections in 2024, the CSA called the Electoral Commission (EC) to be proactive in addressing issues of misinformation and disinformation as part of their theme, Dr Antwi-Boasiako emphasised the urgency of the situation.

Between January and September 2025, Ghana lost GH¢19 million to cybercrime cases with financial losses. On January 16 and 17, 2026, the authority arrested 53 Nigerian nationals and rescue of 44 others who are victims of cybercrime exploitation.

== National Cyber Security Awareness Month (NCSAM) ==
In 2018, the former Vice President of Ghana, Dr Mahamudu Bawumia launched the National Cybersecurity Awareness Programme with a call for concerted, coordinated efforts to fight the ills of cyber crime and prevent it from growing with the theme “A Safer Digital Ghana”. The NCSAM seeks to educate children, the public, businesses, and government stakeholders on cyber hygiene best practices.

On September 1, 2026, The Cyber Security Authority (CSA Ghana), together with its partners launched the 2026 National Cyber Security Awareness Month (NCSAM) at CalBank’s head office auditorium in Accra. Under the theme , Securing Ghana’s Digital Finance Ecosystem: Building Trust through Collaboration and Cyber Resilience, the Director-General of the Cyber Security Authority, Mr. Devine Selase Agbeti, called for a stronger collaboration among financial institutions, telecommunications companies, fintechs, government agencies and the public to protect Ghana’s rapidly expanding digital finance ecosystem from cybercriminals.
