= Nana Aba Appiah Amfo =

Ghanaian linguist and academic

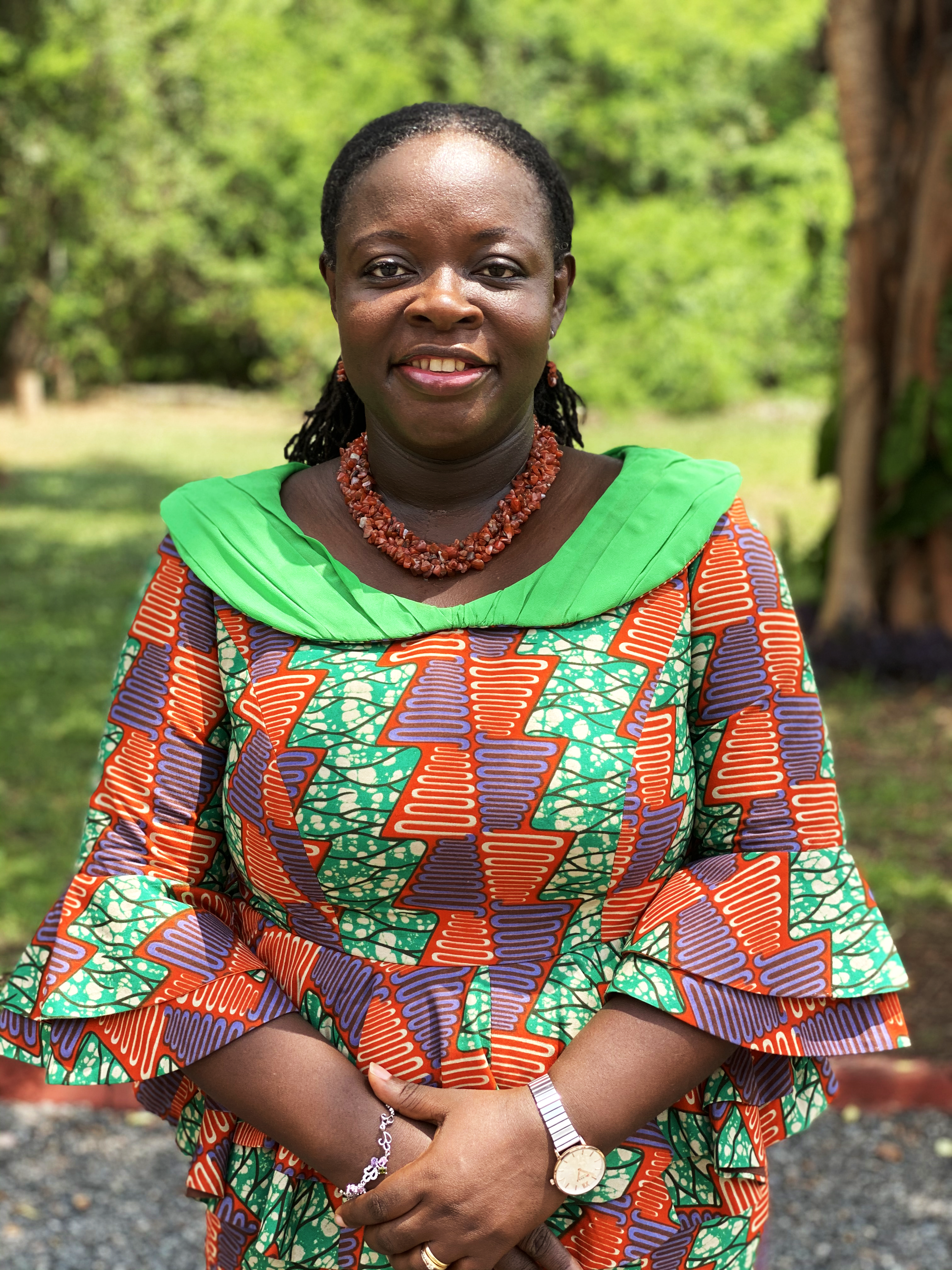
- Nana Aba Appiah Amfo in 2020

Vice-Chancellor of University of Ghana
- Incumbent
- Assumed office 1 August 2021
- Preceded by: Ebenezer Oduro Owusu

Personal details
- Born: Nana Aba Appiah; 30 September 1971 (age 55)
- Education: Holy Child School; Archbishop Porter Girls' School
- Alma mater: University of Ghana (BA); Norwegian University of Science and Technology (MPhil; PhD)
- Profession: Academic; University Administrator

Academic work
- Discipline: Linguistics
- Institutions: University of Ghana, Legon

Nana Aba Appiah Amfo (born 30 September 1971) is a Ghanaian linguist, university administrator and the current Vice-chancellor at the University of Ghana. She is the first female vice-chancellor of the University of Ghana. In the history of Ghana, she is the fourth female vice-chancellor. Until her appointment, she was the Pro Vice-Chancellor for Academics and Students Affairs at the University of Ghana in West Africa.

== Early life and education ==
Nana Aba Appiah Amfo was born in Kumasi on September 30, 1971. She had her early education at then University Primary School (now KNUST Basic School), She continued her basic education at Services Primary School at Takoradi and Goldfields School Complex in Tarkwa. Amfo attended Holy Child School for her 'O'Level education and later attended Archbishop Porter Girls' Secondary School for her A' Level. She proceeded to the University of Ghana, from 1991 to 1996, for a Bachelor's degree in French and Linguistics. She completed the Norwegian University of Science and Technology in Trondheim, Norway in 2001 with an MPhil degree in Linguistics and acquired a PhD degree in 2007 from the same university in Linguistics.

== Career ==
Amfo began her career as a lecturer at the Department of Linguistics at the University of Ghana in 2001. After leaving to pursue further studies in Norway, she returned to Ghana and continued lecturing at the University of Ghana. She was promoted to the rank of Senior Lecturer in 2007, the same year she obtained her PhD. She became an associate professor in 2011, and Professor in 2017. She was elected an executive committee member of Fédération Internationale des Langues et Littératures Modernes. Nana Aba Amfo served as the Pro Vice-Chancellor for Academic and Student Affairs at the University of Ghana from November 2019 to July 2021. In July 2021, she was appointed as the Acting Vice Chancellor. She received professional management training from the Osnabrück University of Applied Sciences, Germany, INSEAD and Harvard Business School. She has served as the Chairperson of the Department of Linguistics (2013–14) and the Dean of the School of Languages. Amfo serves on the advisory board of Coalition of People Against Sexual and Gender-Based Violence and Harmful Practices (CoPASH) under the auspices of the UNFPA.

== Research ==
Amfo's research interests has been mainly about linguistic sub-discipline of Pragmatics, which allows her to explore the role that context plays in our conversational interactions and how that influences communication in different domains.

Her research resulting in several publications in nationally and internationally reputable journals such as Acta Linguistica Hafnensia, Current Issues in Language Planning, Discourse and Society, Ghana Journal of Linguistics, Journal of Pragmatics, Journal of West African Languages, Legon Journal of the Humanities, Lingua, Linguistics, Nordic Journal of African Studies, Nordic Journal of Linguistics, Pragmatics, and Studies in African Linguistics, have covered the role of function words in communication, information structure, grammaticalization, language use in specific domains such as health, gendered contexts, politics, religion, and migratory contexts.

Her (edited) books and book chapters have been published by Ayebia Clarke Publishing Company, John Benjamins Publishing Company, Novus Press, Routledge (Taylor & Francis Group), and SubSaharan Publishers.

Her recently (2018) co-authored textbook on Therapeutic Communication Competencies for Nurses and Midwives, commissioned by the Nursing and Midwifery Council, is published by DigiBooks.

== Hobby ==
Amfo likes to release stress in her free time by usually playing tennis. In October 2025, she won the University of Ghana Corporate Tennis Championship.

== Personal life ==
Nana Aba is the first of four children. She is married to Frank Amfo and the couple have three children.
