= Abutia =

Kingdom in Ghana

Abutia, also: Abutia Area, is a Kingdom in West Africa, in the East of the Republic of Ghana, Volta Region.

== History ==
Abutia is a traditional area in Ghana with Teti, Agorve and Kloe as its three (3) main towns.

In colonial time Abutia was part of Togoland as German Colony from 1884 to 1916 and British Protectorate from 1916 to 1945. When Ghana gained independence on 6 March 1957, Abutia became part of the Republic of Ghana.

In 1992 the parliament enacted the new constitution of the Republic of Ghana, in which the traditional areas got cultural sovereignty (subnational monarchy). In 2008 a special decree of the chieftaincy was established.

Since 1998 the Togbe (King) and traditional ruler is Togbe Abutia Kodzo Gidi V.

== Geography and Territory ==
The traditional national territory of Abutia is located between latitudes 6.33˚ 3ˈ N and 6.93˚ 6ˈ N and longitudes 0.17˚ 4ˈ E and 0.53˚ 39ˈ E. It shares boundaries with the Afadjato area to the North, the Adaklu District to the South, South Dayi District to the West, Ho Municipal and the Republic of Togo to the East.

It has a total land area of 1.002,79 km^{2}.

=== Regions and Towns ===
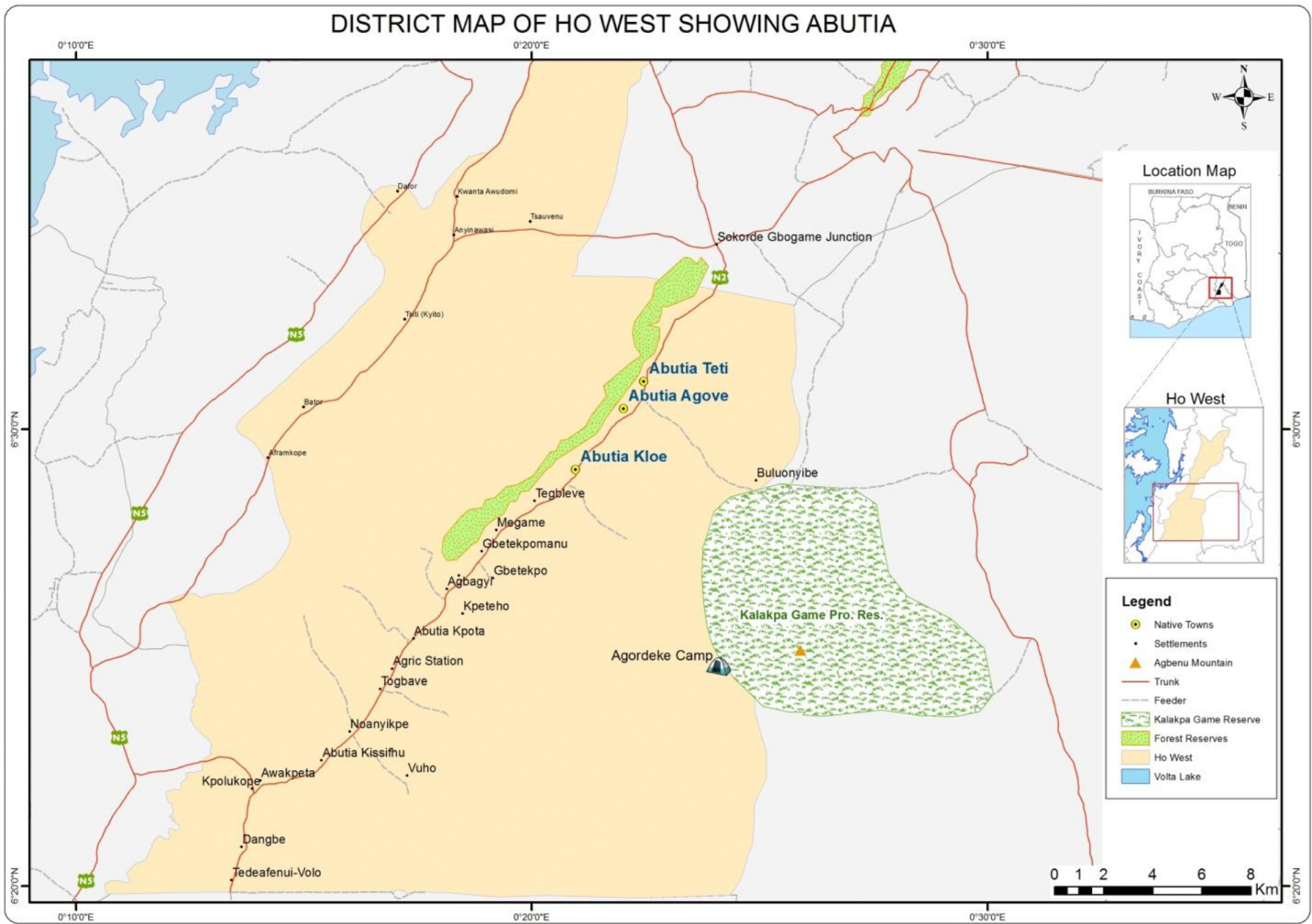
Map of Abutia (Ghana)

Today's towns and villages of Abutia are:

- Agbagyi
- Agorve
- Aframkope
- Agric
- Amesinyakope
- Anyinawasi
- Argordeke
- Avetakpo
- Awakpeta
- Bator
- Buluonyibe
- Dalor
- Dangbe
- Dzanyodake
- Forsime
- Gbetekpo
- Gbetekpomanu
- Hlorve
- Kissifli
- Kloe
- Kpeteho
- Kpogadzi
- Kpolukope
- Kpota
- Kwanta Awudomi
- Togbave
- Tedeafenu
- Tedeafenu-Volo
- Tegbleve
- Teti
- Tsauvenu
- Tsili (Kyito)
- Megame
- Norris
- Noanyikbe
- Sebekope
- Vohu
- Wodome

== National park ==
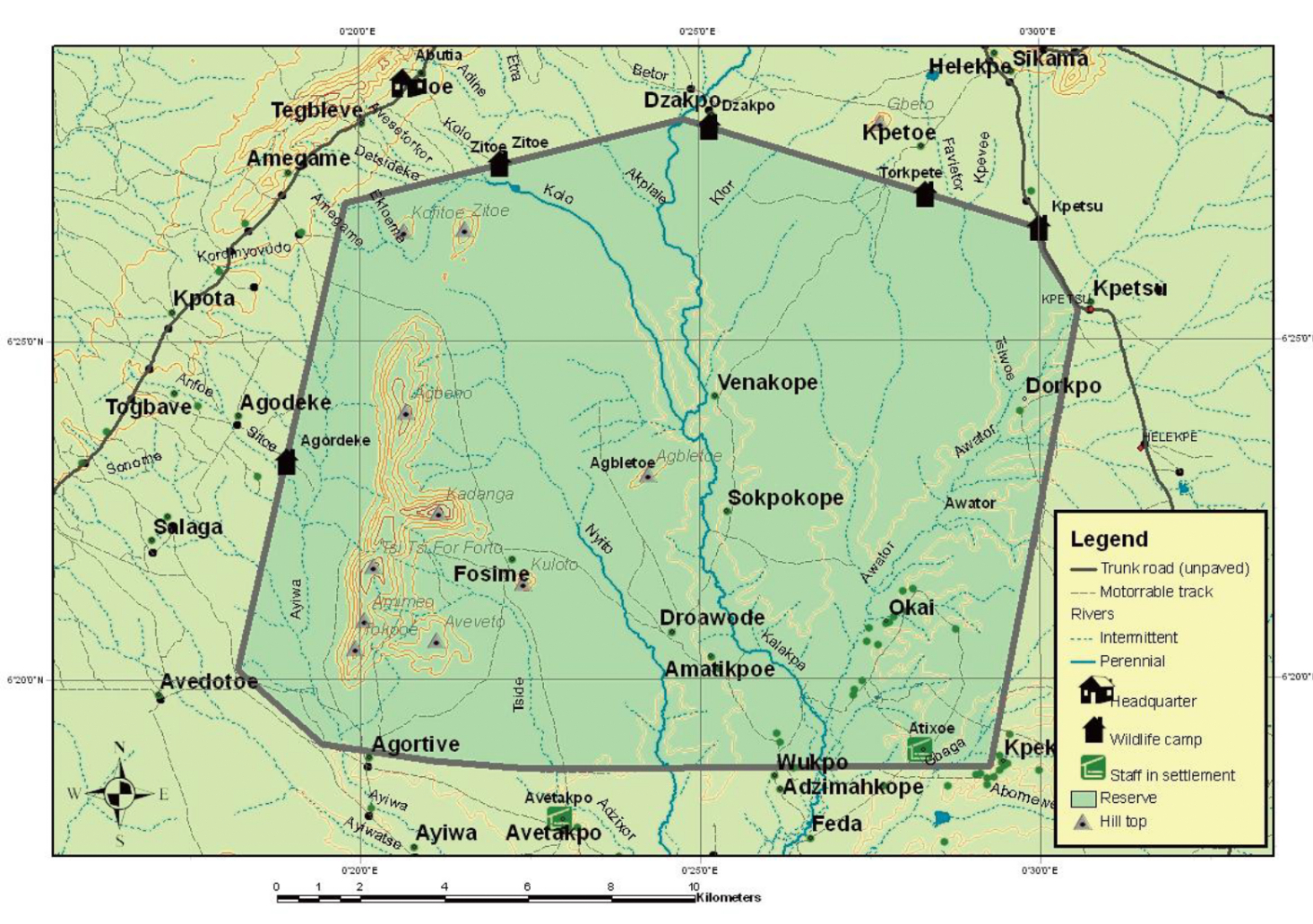
Kalakpa Resource Reserve

The Kalakpa Resource Reserve is a national park in Abutia, Ghana. It is located in the South-East of the Abutia Hills Forest Reserve between 6°18' and 6°28' N and 0°17' and 0°30' E and in the Abutia and Adaklu traditional areas. The Kalakpa River divides the Abutia land from the Adaklu land. The Reserve covers an area of about 325 km^{2} square of forest/savanna transition zone, and the dominant vegetation is the dry Borassus-Combretum woodland.

== See also ==
- History of Ghana
- Orders, decorations, and medals of Ghana
