= The Institute of Economic Affairs, Ghana =

Ghanaian organization

The Institute of Economic Affairs, Ghana logo

The Institute of Economic Affairs (IEA), Ghana, is a public policy think tank based in Accra, Ghana. It is known to be Ghana's premier public policy institute. It was founded by a Ghanaian economist, Dr. Charles Mensa in 1989 at a time when the country was governed by a military regime (Ghana was governed by the Provisional National Defence Council). The IEA was set up as an independent, non-government institution dedicated to the establishment and strengthening of a market economy and a democratic, free and open society. The IEA supports research, promotes and publishes studies on economic, socio-political and legal issues in order to enhance understanding of public policy.

== The board of directors ==
As of 2024, Todd Moss and Charles Mensah are directors of the institute.

The current executive director of the IEA is Dr Dede Amanor-Wilks. Dr Amanor-Wilks took over from Jean Adukwei Mensa in 2018 when she was appointed as chairperson of the Electoral Commission of Ghana.

== Objectives ==
- Providing a forum/platform for the exchange of ideas
- Promoting research and publication of economic, socio-political and legal issues in order to enhance the understanding of public policy
- Strengthening local capacity in Ghana by providing training to institutions of democracy such as Parliament, the Judiciary, the Media and civil society
- Demonstrating the power of both profit and non-profit private institutions
- Promoting the use of economic reasoning and understand the world of scarcity, choice and trade offs
- Monitoring and providing an in depth analysis on the progress of democratic consolidation in Ghana and in Sub-Saharan Africa.

== Work ==
Research work at the IEA is done by it key staff of 33 individuals with diverse professions such as policy analyst, economists, researchers, management consultants, industry experts, and administrative staff.

The main line of work is categorized into three Centres: The Economics Centre, the Governance Centre and the Survey Centre.

This work includes in-house research in the areas of economics and governance, commissioned research, the production of a refereed policy journal called the Ghana Policy Journal and review of research and policy-related papers for external organizations.

The survey Centre seeks to build expertise in the conduct and analysis of surveys with a view to ensuring that policy debate on governance and economic issues projects the accurate views of a broad range of Ghanaians.

In addition to its research agenda, the IEA also undertakes direct work to promote sustainable democracy in Ghana. For the 1996 presidential election, the IEA established a coalition of Civil Society Organisations (NADEO) to monitor the election. The IEA has played a role in monitoring every major election since then.

The IEA has also assisted the Parliament of Ghana in carrying out its functions, training legislative research assistants in 1996 to work in Parliament. In the year 2000, the IEA also organised the first-ever Presidential debate in Ghana with the debates being held every election year. In 2008, Vice-Presidential debates were included for the first time.

In 2004, the IEA also facilitated the formation of a Political Parties Code of Conduct and the setting up of a National Enforcement Body to regulate the code. Eight political parties ultimately signed the code.

The IEA has also played a role in developing and encouraging the enactment of legislation. In 2003, the Ghanaian Cabinet approved two bills originating from the IEA. These were the Whistle Blowers Bill and the Right to Information Bill. The Whistle Blowers Bill was passed into law in 2008 by Parliament.

Through the IEA's Ghana Political Parties Programme the IEA has also brought the major political parties together to consider other IEA drafted legislation. These have included the Public Funding of Political Parties Bill, the Political Parties Bill and more recently the Presidential Transition Bill. The IEA's role in facilitating bipartisan cooperation on these Bills was recognised in the inaugural State of the Nation Address by President John Atta Mills on February 19, 2009. The President stated that:

"Madam Speaker,

Several areas of our governance agenda require legislative intervention. Fortunately, The IEA-sponsored 'Ghana Political Parties Programme' which is made up of all the political parties with representation in Parliament has agreed on several draft Bills that will respond to this need. Consequently, the Government will consider these draft Bills for possible Parliamentary enactment in order to fill the void. The Bills are:

- Public Financing of Political Parties Bill, including the creation of an Election Fund for political parties and guaranteed funding for the Electoral Commission;
- A new Political Parties Bill; and
- A Presidential Transition Bill."

== Funding ==
The IEA has collaborated with several foundations and development agencies, including:

- Netherlands Institute for Multiparty Democracy (NIMD)
- The United Nations Development Programme (UNDP)
- The Canadian International Development Agency (CIDA)
- The Danish Government, through The Danish International Development Agency (DANIDA) Fellowship Centre
- The Royal Netherlands Embassy
- The Centre for International Private Enterprise (CIPE) and
- The National Endowment for Democracy
- The Ford Foundation
- Department for International Development
- Star Ghana Foundation
