= Freedom Research Association =

Turkish think-tank

- Mission: To conduct research on public policies which will lay the ground for a free and more prosperous Turkey.
- Focus: Public Policy Research, Advocacy, Media Exposure and Social Influence on Policy-makers and the public
- President: Bican Şahin
- Executive Director: İsrafil Özkan
- Faculty: 21
- Staff: 4
- Key people: Bican Şahin, Ergun Özbudun, Mustafa Erdoğan, Mustafa Akyol, Nesrin Nas, Murat Çokgezen
- Slogan: "For a Free and Prosperous Society."
- Location: 06530 Çankaya Mahallesi, Atatürk Bulvarı, No: 160/10 Çankaya, Ankara, Turkey
- Coordinates: 39°56′00″N 32°50′13″E
- Website: oad.org.tr

Freedom Research Association (Turkish: Özgürlük Araştırmaları Derneği) is an Ankara-based public policy research organization (think-tank) with a mission to promote evidence-based policy-making and to help consolidate liberal institutions in Turkey. Founded in 2014, the think tank brings together distinguished political scientists, legal scholars, journalists and business people to publish original research and make an impact on public policy.

FRA produces policy papers, reports and commentaries on various public policy issues including freedom of press, freedom of association and assembly, healthcare, regulations, structural reforms, checks and balance mechanisms, democratization, public alcohol policy, tax awareness, climate change. Besides, FRA acts as a watchdog organization strongly defending individual liberties, the rule of law and free market in Turkey.

FRA operates as a roof organization for its three centers:

1. Center for Democracy and Rule of Law

2. Center for Economic Liberties

3. Center for Civil Liberties

Centers conduct extensive research on any public policy subject related to their field from an empirical and analytical point of view, publish reports and host public events.

FRA's "Online FreedomTalks" gathers academics, bureaucrats, experts and students to discuss political and economic developments. The Rule of Law Academy is a flagship project that reaches hundred of young legal practitioners every year. Also Structural Reforms in Turkey and Turkish Public Alcohol Policy Watch are among the newest projects of FRA.

== See also ==
- Liberalism in Turkey
- Classical liberalism
