= Fred Oware =

Ghanaian politician

CEO of Bui Power Authority
- President: Nana Addo Dankwa Akuffo-Addo

Personal details
- Born: Mankessim
- Party: New Patriotic Party

Fred Oware is a Ghanaian politician and the first Chief Executive Officer of Bui Power Authority, the administrative body of the Bui Dam which is Ghana's third hydroelectric power generation plant and also second largest.

Change of government in 2008 when the National Democratic Congress was elected into office saw him replaced with a new CEO Jabesh Amissah-Arthur. He is a member of the New Patriotic Party and served as the party's first National Vice Chairman until 2013. He is currently the party's second vice chairman and the current CEO of Bui Power Authority, brought in after the NPP regained power in Ghana's 2016 Elections. He is an entrepreneur and once the owner of Choice FM. Mr. Oware is a philanthropist who has donated so much to the poor and needy in society but has a penchant for avoiding the cameras in his numerous philanthropic acts.
