= Faustina Oware-Gyekye =

Ghanaian nurse leader

- Education: Nurses’ Training College, Kumasi Midwifery Training College, Korle-Bu; University of Ghana Tufts University
- Known for: Leadership in nursing

Faustina Oware-Gyekye is a Ghanaian nurse leader who has taught at Mountcrest University College and the University of Ghana.

She was the president of the Ghana chapter of the West African College of Nursing and has edited several nursing journals.

== Early life and education ==
Oware-Gyekye attended Wesley Girl's High School in Cape Coast and was trained in nursing at Nurses’ Training College, Kumasi, and in midwifery at the Midwifery Training College, Korle Bu.

She holds a diploma in nursing education, a bachelor's degree in nursing, and a master's degree in medical geography from the University of Ghana.

In 1999, she obtained a post-graduate certificate in leadership and management from Tufts University.

== Career ==
Oware-Gyekye taught at the Midwifery Training School, Korle-Bu between 1975 and 1987, and taught at the University of Ghana until 2008.

Between 2000 and 2008, she was a member of the Nurses and Midwives Governing Council of Ghana.

Most recently, Oware-Gyekye worked as a senior lecturer at Mountcrest University College, Accra and from 2019 to 2021 was the president of the Ghana chapter of the West African College of Nursing. She also worked as a sub-editor of the West African College of Nursing journal, served as a member of the editorial board of Ghanaian Nurse (journal).

== Selected publications ==
- Gans-Lartey, F., O'Brien, B. A., Oware-Gyekye, F., & Schopflocher, D. (2013). The relationship between the use of the partograph and birth outcomes at Korle-Bu teaching hospital. Midwifery, 29(5), 461–467.
- Oware-Gyekye, Faustina. "Pain management: The role of the Nurse." West African Journal of Nursing 19.1 (2008).
