= Barbara Ackah-Yensu =

Ghanaian judge (born 1955)

Justice Barbara Frances Ackah-Yensu

Justice of the Supreme Court of Ghana
- In office 2022 – 2 February 2025
- Nominated by: Nana Akufo-Addo

Appeal Court Judge
- In office 8 October 2012 – December 2022
- Nominated by: John Mahama

High Court Judge
- In office 16 September 2003 – 2012
- Nominated by: John Kufuor

Personal details
- Born: 2 February 1955 (age 71) Ghana
- Education: Wesley Girls' High School
- Alma mater: University of Ghana; Ghana School of Law; China Europe International Business School; The Queen's College, Oxford
- Occupation: Judge
- Profession: Lawyer

Barbara Frances Ackah-Yensu (born 2 February 1955) is a Ghanaian judge and a retired Justice of the Supreme Court of Ghana. She has been on the bench in Ghana since 2003 and was appointed to the Supreme Court in 2022. She served in that capacity until her retirement on 2 February 2025.

== Early life and education ==
Ackah-Yensu was born in Cape Coast. She had her middle school education at Christ the King School from 1965 to 1967 after which she entered Wesley Girls' High School for her Ordinary Level and Advanced Level Certificates, both of which she obtained in 1972 and 1974 respectively. In 1974, she was admitted to the University of Ghana, where she studied Psychology and Sociology. She obtained her bachelor's degree in Psychology and Sociology in 1977.

Following her graduation, she returned to the University of Ghana (Faculty of Law) where she studied for her Qualifying Certificate in Law (QCL) from January 1979 to September 1979. She then proceeded to the Ghana School of Law, where she was called to the bar in 1981. In 2010, she received an Executive Master's degree from the China Europe International Business School, and in 2019, a diploma in International Arbitration from The Queen's College, Oxford.

== Career ==
Following her undergraduate studies, Ackah-Yensu joined the Ghana Reassurance Organisation in Accra as a marketing officer for her National Service from 1977 to 1979. Following her call to the bar in 1981, she entered private practice, working with companies such as Lynes Quarshie-Idun & Co., National Investment Bank (NIB), Non-Performing Assets Recovery Trust, Ghanaian Australian Goldfields Ltd, Ashanti Goldfields Ltd, and World Bank/Non-Performing Assets Recovery Trust in Uganda.

On 16 September 2003, Ackah-Yensu was sworn into office as a Justice of the High Court of Ghana. She was based at the Tema High Court until 2005 when she was transferred to the Commercial Court. She was one of the pioneer judges of the Commercial Court, a division under the High Court, and served as President of the Commercial Court from 2010 until October 2012 when she was appointed Justice of the Appeals Court of Ghana.

== Supreme Court appointment ==
On 4 July 2022, the president, on the advice of the Judicial Council and in consultation with the Council of State, nominated Ackah-Yensu, along with three other judges (George Kingsley Koomson, Samuel Kwame Adibu Asiedu, and Ernest Yao Gaewu) to the Supreme Court. On 25 July 2022, the speaker of parliament, Alban Bagbin, announced the nominations in parliament and referred them to the appointments committee for consideration.

On 18 October 2022, Ackah-Yensu was vetted by the appointments committee, and on 7 December 2022, the appointments committee recommended her approval, along with that of Samuel Adibu Asiedu to parliament. According to the committee, "the two nominees demonstrated dexterity in the knowledge of the law and showed character and competence." They also added that "they pledged to interpret the law without fear or favour and eschew partisanship in their rulings." On 11 December 2022, the Parliament of Ghana unanimously approved her nomination.

She was sworn into office by the president, Nana Akufo-Addo, on 28 December 2022.

== Other professional activities ==
Acka-Yensu was one of four government nominees on the University of Ghana Council. She was also a part-time Senior Lecturer in Alternative Dispute Resolution (ADR) at the Ghana School of Law.

== Personal life ==
Ackah-Yensu is married with five children, four sons and a daughter. She is a Roman Catholic.

== See also ==
- List of judges of the Supreme Court of Ghana
- Supreme Court of Ghana
