= University of Ghana =

Public university in Accra

- Arms of the University of Ghana
- Motto: Latin: Integri Procedamus
- Motto in English: "Proceed with Integrity"
- Type: Public
- Established: 11 August 1948; 78 years ago
- Academic affiliations: Association of African Universities; Association of Commonwealth Universities; McDonnell International Scholars Academy
- Chairperson: Marietta Brew Appiah-Oppong
- Chancellor: Mary Chinery-Hesse
- Vice-Chancellor: Nana Aba Appiah Amfo
- Students: 60,875 as of July 2021
- Undergraduates: 53,043
- Postgraduates: 6,612
- Doctoral students: 1,220
- Location: University of Ghana; P.O. Box LG 25; Legon, Ghana, Accra, Greater Accra Region, Ghana; 05°39′03″N 00°11′13″W
- Campus: Suburban area
- Colours: Midnight Blue, Lemon Yellow and Vegas Gold
- Nickname: Legon
- Website: www.ug.edu.gh
- Ranked by QS World University Rankings as the Best University in Ghana.

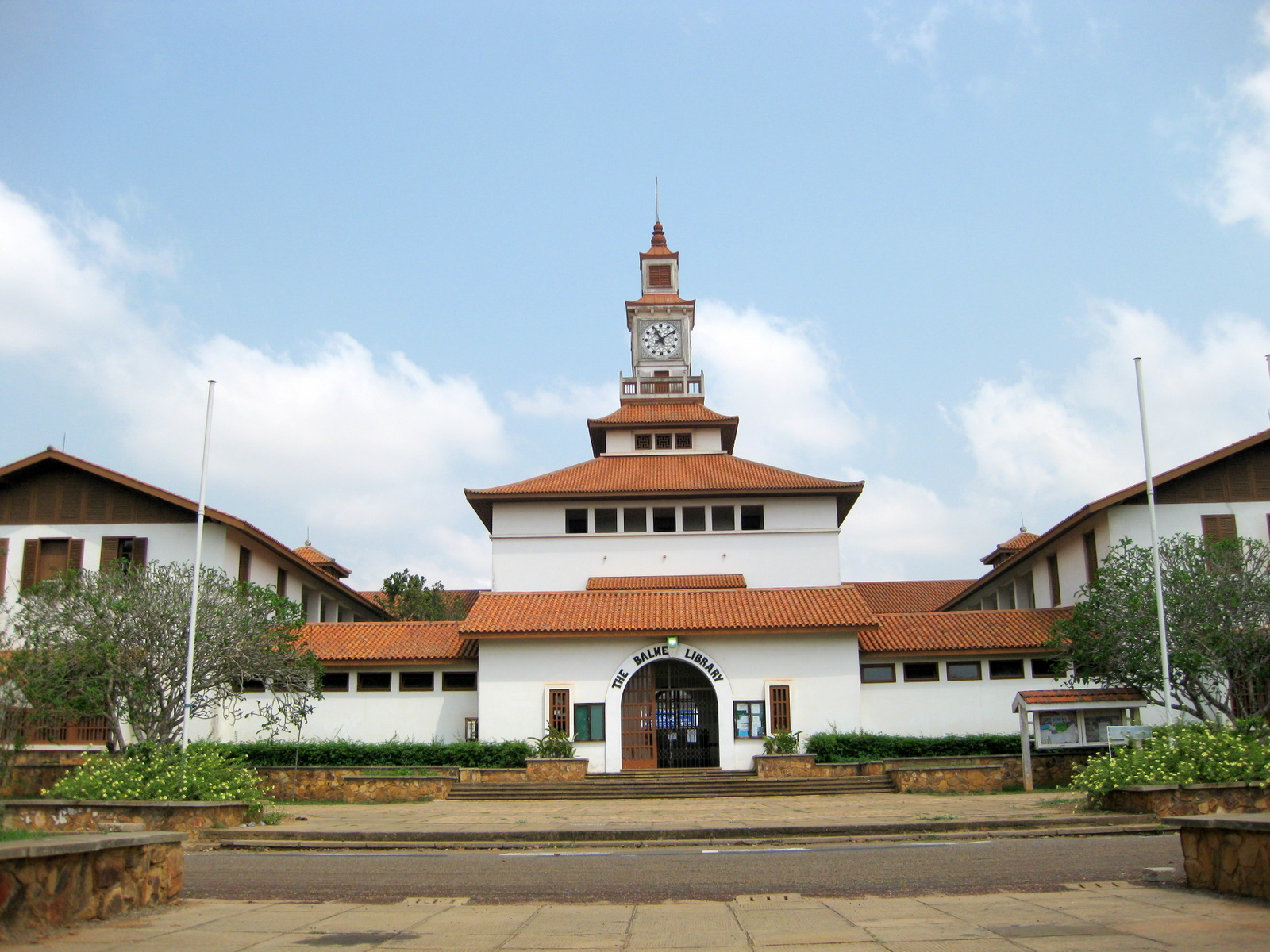
The Balme Library

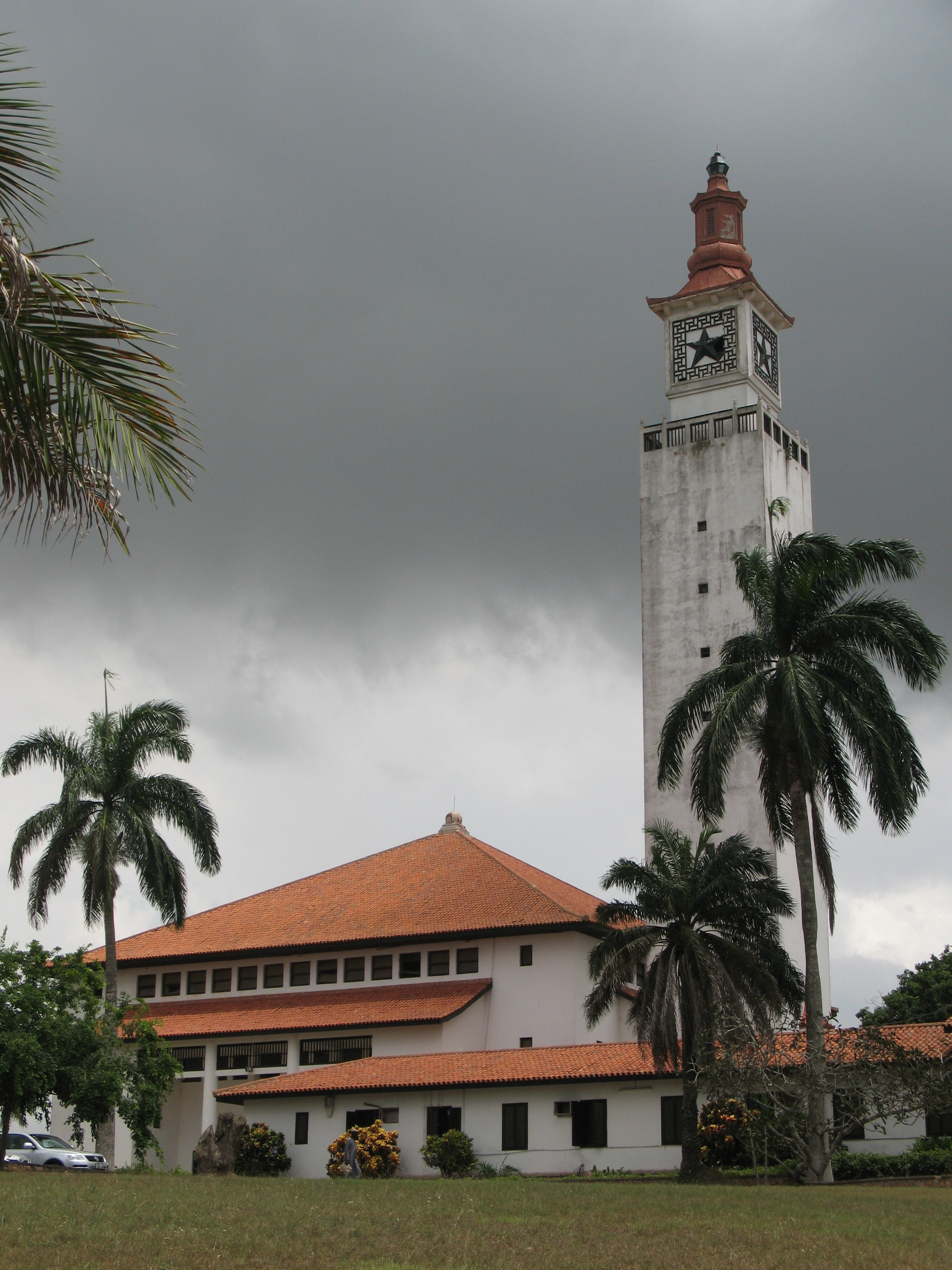
Legon Tower

The University of Ghana is a public university located in Accra, Ghana. It is the oldest public university in the country.

The university was founded in 1948 as the University College of the Gold Coast in the British colony of the Gold Coast. It was originally an affiliate college of the University of London, which supervised its academic programs and awarded degrees. After Ghana gained independence in 1957, the college was renamed the University College of Ghana. It changed it name again to the University of Ghana in 1961, when it gained full university status.

The University of Ghana is situated on the west side of the Accra Legon Hills and northeast of the center of Accra. It has over 60,000 registered students.

== Introduction ==
The original emphasis on establishing the University of Ghana was on the Liberal Arts, Social Sciences, Law, Basic Science, Agriculture, and Medicine. However, as part of a national educational reform program, the university's curriculum was expanded to provide more Technology-based and Vocational courses as well as Postgraduate Training.

The University of Ghana, which is mainly based in Legon, about 12 kilometers northeast of the center of Accra, has its Medical School and Dental School in Korle-Bu a suburb of Accra, with a Teaching Hospital and the Accra city Campus. It also has a School of Nuclear and Allied Sciences at the Ghana Atomic Energy Commission, making it one of the few Universities in Africa offering programs in Nuclear Physics and Nuclear Engineering.

=== The University of Ghana logo ===
University of Ghana logo

The logo is made up of two colors: indigo and camel. The blue shield with three "AYA" standing upright in the top half and "DWENINMENTOASO" in the middle of the bottom half, all embossed in gold. The logo was designed by A. M. Opoku. "AYA" (Akan word for fern) is an Adinkra symbol. The "AYA" grows straight and it is used to represent truthfulness and an ability to stay upright.

Ram's Horns: "Dweninmen" (Akan word for ram's horn) is an Adinkra symbol. Here, two interlocking ram's horns (DWENINMENTOASO) have been used to symbolise strength and a call to pursue a path of integrity. The University of Ghana was granted degree-awarding status in 1961.

== History ==
The formation of the West African Commission of the Asquith Commission on Higher Education in the Colonies under the chairmanship of Rt. Hon. Walter Elliot was the birth of this institution in 1948. The commission recommended the setting up of university colleges in association with the University of London, thus the University College of the Gold Coast was founded by Ordinance on 11 August 1948 for the purpose of providing for and promoting university education, learning and research. The people of Gold Coast rejected the recommendation that a single university college be established for the entire British West Africa region, with the college located in Nigeria. This rejection made it possible for the University of Ghana to be established.

In the book commissioned by the University of Ghana, Professor Francis Agbodeka (1998) found that "Two members of the Legislative Council on their own volition worked on the question of securing funds for the project. More significant, F. M. Bourret (1949), in almost a contemporaneous account, reported that the strong and united opinion expressed by Dr. Nanka-Bruce in a Radio Station Zoy address to the People of the Gold Coast in October 1947, "was largely instrumental in influencing the Secretary of State for the colonies" to finally give his consent in 1947, "for the establishment of a Gold Coast University College."

Significantly, the establishment of the University of Ghana, based on the Elliot Commission's Majority Report (of which Sir Arku Korsah of the Gold Coast was a member), was the culmination of immense work of several organizations, committees, institutions, and prominent individuals, at home and abroad. Among some of the most prominent Ghanaians, members of organizations and civil society groups that campaigned for the establishment of the University of College of the Gold Coast/Ghana, included also Dr. Nanka-Bruce, Rev. Prof. C. G. Baeta, and Sir E. Asafu-Adjaye, Dr. J. B. and Danquah.1

In 1961 the Government of Ghana under Kwame Nkrumah passed the University of Ghana Act, 1961 (Act 79) to replace the University College of Ghana. Through that act, the university attained sovereign university status and mandate to award its own degrees.

== Office of the Chancellor ==
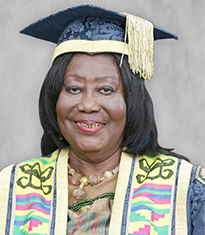
Mrs. Mary Chinery-Hesse

Mary Chinery-Hesse is the current Chancellor of the university. She was elected as Chancellor and subsequently inducted into office on Wednesday, 1 August 2018, at a Special Congregation of the university held in the Great Hall. After serving her first 5-year tenure, she was reappointed on 6 July 2023, to serve a second spell as the Chancellor of the University.

=== Past Chancellors of the University ===
Until the year 1998, the Head of State acted as Chancellor of the University of Ghana. In 1961 when the University of Ghana was established by an Act of Parliament, the first Head of State of independent Ghana, Dr. Kwame Nkrumah became the first Chancellor of the University.

The following have held the position of Chancellor of the university:

- Kwame Nkrumah (1961–1965)
- Joseph Arthur Ankrah (1966–1968)
- Akwasi Afrifa (1969)
- Edward Akufo-Addo (1970–1971)
- Ignatius Kutu Acheampong (1972–1978)
- Fred Akuffo (1978–1979)
- Hilla Limann (1979–1981)
- Jerry Rawlings (1982–1991)
- Oyeeman Wereko Ampem II (1998–2005)
- Kofi Annan (2008–2018)

== Office of the Vice-Chancellor ==
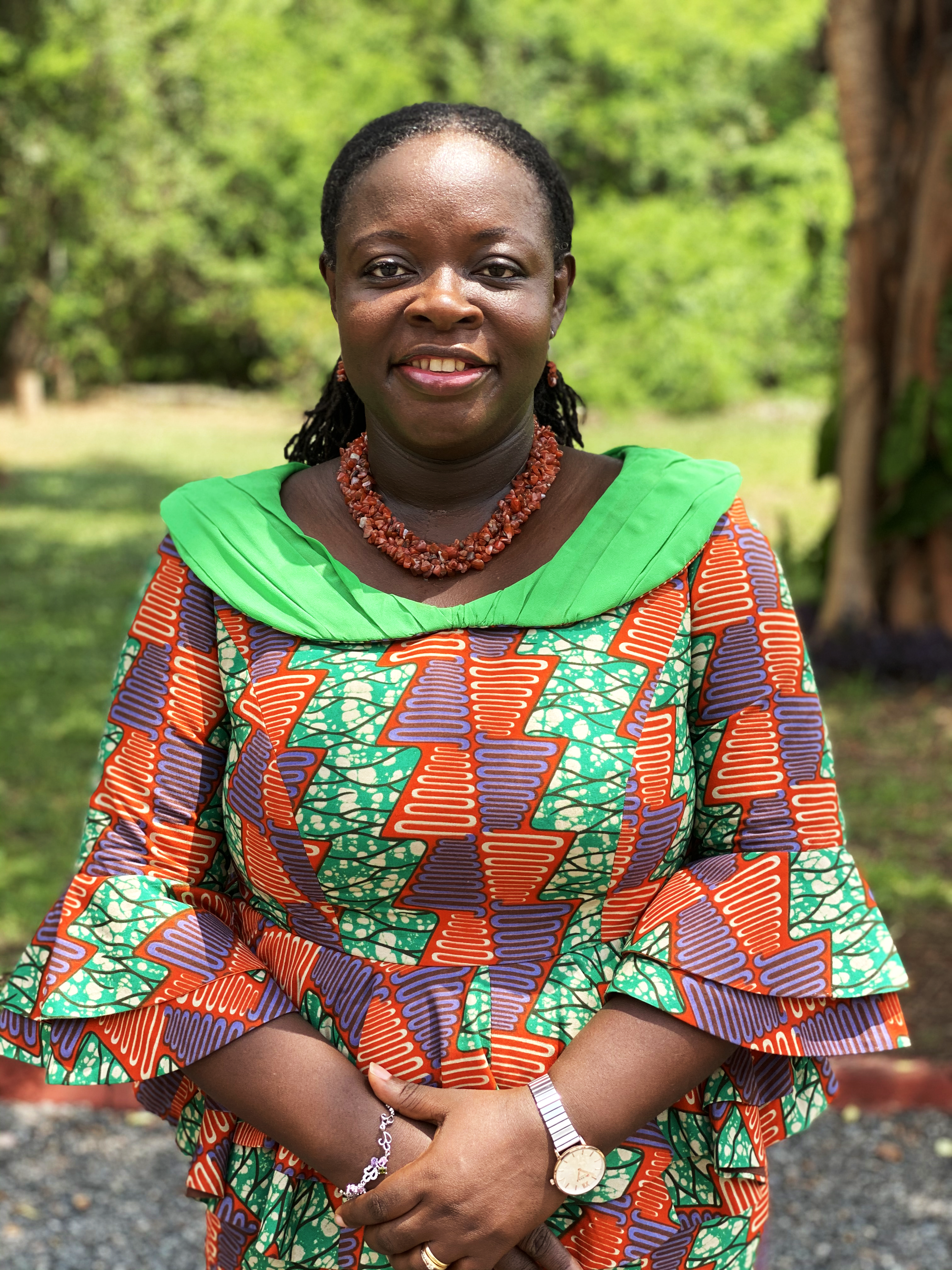
Prof. Nana Aba Appiah Amfo - Current Vice-Chancellor

Nana Aba Appiah Amfo is the current Vice-Chancellor of the University of Ghana. In July 2021, she was appointed as the Acting Vice Chancellor. In October 2021, she was appointed as Vice-Chancellor of the University of Ghana. Her appointment took effect from 26 October 2021. She became the first woman to occupy the position of Vice-Chancellor in the University.

=== Past vice-chancellors and principals ===
The following have held the position of vice-chancellors and principals of the university:

University College of the Gold Coast

- David Mowbray Balme (1948–1957), Principal

University College of Ghana

- David Mowbray Balme (1957–1958), Principal
- Raymond Henry Stoughton (1958–1961), Principal

University of Ghana

- Conor Cruise O'Brien (1962–1965), Vice-Chancellor
- Alexander Kwapong (1966–1975), Vice-Chancellor
- Daniel Adzei Bekoe (1976–1983), Vice-Chancellor
- Akilagpa Sawyerr (1985–1992), Vice-Chancellor
- George Benneh (1992–1996), Vice-Chancellor
- Ivan Addae-Mensah (1996–2002), Vice-Chancellor
- Kwadwo Asenso-Okyere (2002–2006), Vice-Chancellor
- Clifford Nii-Boi Tagoe (2006–2010), Vice-Chancellor
- Ernest Aryeetey (2010–2016), Vice-Chancellor
- Ebenezer Oduro Owusu (2016–2021), Vice-Chancellor
- Nana Aba Appiah Amfo (2021-Date), Vice-Chancellor

== Academics ==
=== The Balme Library ===
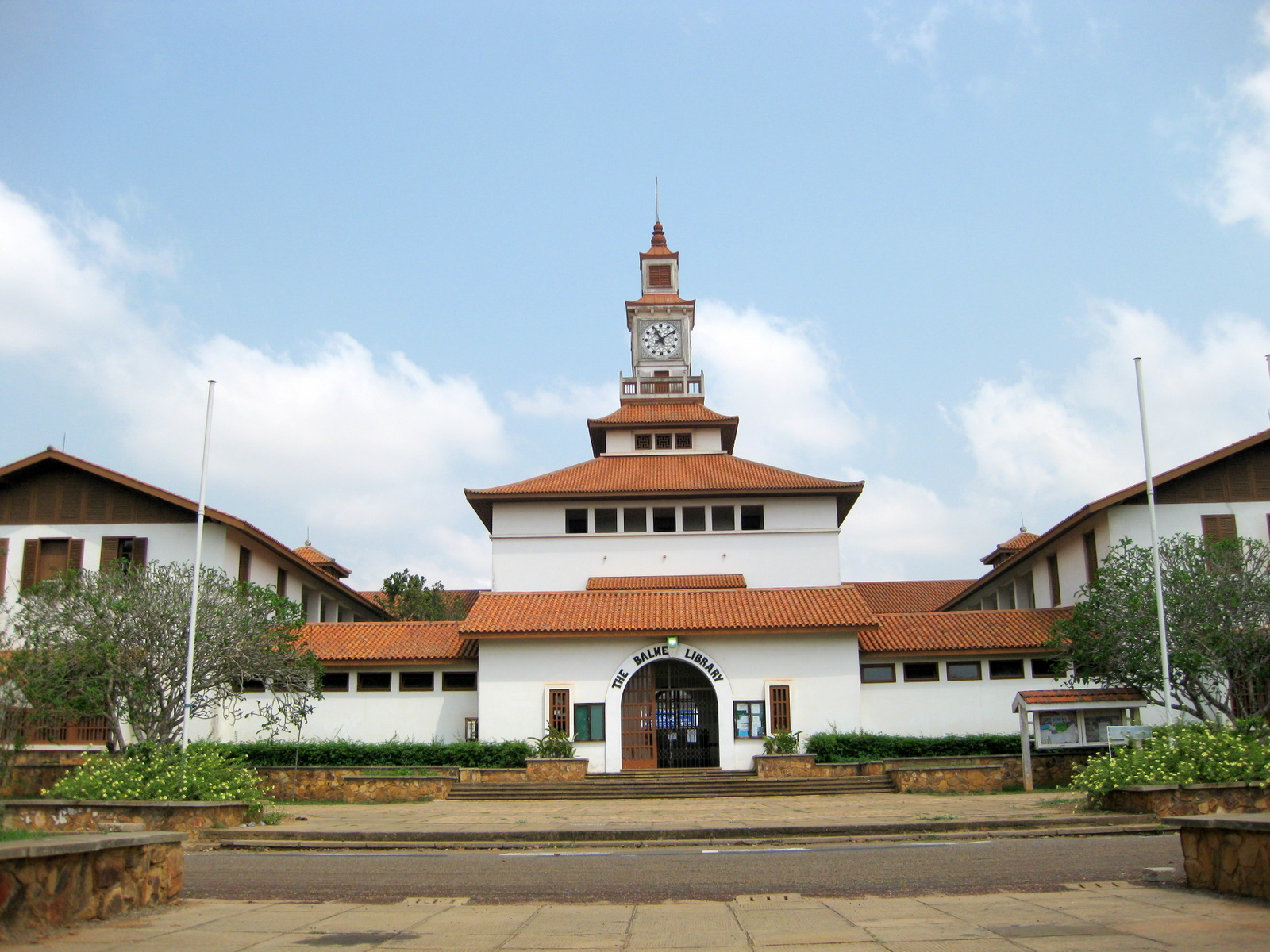
Main entrance to the Balme Library

The Balme Library was established in 1948 as the Achimota College Library. It is the main library of the university's library network.

The Balme library is located on the main campus of the university.

=== College of Health Sciences ===
There are six Schools and one Research Institute under this college. They include:

- School of Medicine and Dentistry
- School of Biomedical and Allied Health Sciences
- School of Nursing
- School of Pharmacy
- School of Public Health
- School of Education and Leadership
- Noguchi Memorial Institute for Medical Research
- Centre for Tropical, Clinical Pharmacology & Therapeutics

College of Basic and Applied Sciences

There are five Schools, six Centres (3 research based) and two Institutes under this college. They include:

- School of Physical and Mathematical Sciences
- School of Biological Sciences
- School of Agriculture
- School of Engineering Sciences
- School of Veterinary Medicine
- Livestock and Poultry Research Centre (LIPREC)
- Soil and Irrigation Research Centre (SIREC)
- Forest and Horticultural Research Centre (FOHCREC)
- Biotechnology Centre
- West African Centre for Crop Improvement (WACCI)
- West African Centre for Cell Biology and Infectious Pathogens (WACCBIP)
- Institute of Environment and Sanitation Studies
- Institute of Applied Sciences and Technology

=== Collegiate system ===
From the 2014/2015 academic year, the University of Ghana adopted the collegiate system and thus categorised all schools and departments under four colleges, which are:

- College of Basic and Applied Sciences
- College of Humanities
- College of Education
- College of Health Sciences

=== Other faculties ===
There are five faculties outside the above Colleges and they include:

- Faculty of Arts
- Faculty of Social Studies
- Faculty of Science
- Faculty of Law: first established as a department of the Faculty of Social Studies in the 1958/59 academic year, became a full-fledged faculty in the 1960/61 academic year.
- Faculty of Engineering Sciences

=== International Programmes Office ===
The University of Ghana's International Programmes Office (IPO) was established in 1997 to harmonize the university's international efforts. It promotes all international activities, including admission of international students, Memorandums of Understanding between the University and International educational institutions, visiting scholars, study abroad programmes, staff and student exchange programmes and research collaboration. The university has over 200 agreements with educational institutions all over the world, and works with organizations such as the Council on International Educational Exchange (CIEE), California State University (CSU), University of California Education Abroad Program (UCEAP), and International Society of Education Planners International Student Exchange Programs to facilitate student exchange programmes.

=== University of Ghana campuses ===
==== Legon campus ====
The Legon campus lies about 13 kilometers north-east of Accra, the capital of Ghana. This is where most of the university's teaching and research are carried out. The Legon campus also houses the central administration of the university. there are a number of student residences located on the Legon campus.

==== Korle-Bu Campus ====
The Korle-Bu campus, headed by a provost, houses the administration of the College of Health Sciences. Some of the constituent schools are also located on the Korle-Bu Campus; the School of Medicine and Dentistry and the School of Allied Health Sciences.

==== Accra City campus ====
This campus is strategically located in the heart of the city and precisely at Adabraka and opposite the Ministry of Information.

This campus is mainly for Bachelor of Science(Bsc) in Business Administration related courses and Bachelor of Arts (BA) courses .

==== Kumasi City campus ====
This campus is part of the College of Education, and also offers Bachelor of Science in Business Administration.

=== Distance Education Campuses ===
The university has Distance Education campuses in the various regions where it runs a variety of programs, including degree courses.

- Accra Workers' College, (now Accra City campus), Accra
- Awudome Residential Workers' College, Tsito
- Bolgatanga Workers' College, Bolgatanga
- Cape Coast Workers' College, Cape Coast
- Ho Workers' College, Ho
- Koforidua Workers' College, Koforidua
- Kumasi Workers' College, Kumasi
- Takoradi Workers' College, Sekondi-Takoradi
- Tamale Workers' College, Tamale
- Tema Workers' College, Tema
- Sunyani Workers' College, Sunyani
- Wa Workers' College, Wa

=== Institutional Affiliations ===
Affiliations include:

- Accra College of Medicine, Accra
- African University College of Business & Technology, Accra
- Catholic University College, Sunyani
- Christian Service University College, Kumasi
- Family Health Medical School, Accra
- Ghana Armed Forces Command and Staff College, Accra
- Ghana Institute of Languages, Accra
- Institute of Accountancy Training, Accra
- Islamic University College, Accra
- Knustford University College, Accra
- Methodist University College, Accra
- Narh-Bita College, Tema
- Nightingale School of Nursing, Accra
- National Film and Television Institute (NAFTI), Accra
- Presbyterian University College, Mpraeso/Abetifi-Kwahu
- Regional Maritime University, Accra
- St. Peter's Seminary, Cape-Coast
- St. Paul's Seminary, Sowutuom-Achimota
- St. Victor's Seminary, Tamale
- Western Hills School of Nursing, Accra
- Wisconsin International University College, Accra

=== Rankings and reputation ===
University rankings

Global – Overall
- ARWU World: 901–1000 (2023)
- QS World: 851–900 (2026)
- THE World: 1001–1200 (2024)
- USNWR Global: 907 (2022–2023)

Regional – Overall
- THE Africa: =25 (2024)

National – Overall
- ARWU National: 1 (2023)
- QS National: 1 (2024)
- THE National: =2 (2024)
- USNWR National: 2 (2022–2023)

The Times Higher Education World University Rankings of 2018 ranks the University of Ghana at the 800-1000th place globally and 17th in Africa (rank shared with other universities).

== Research and learning centres ==
The Graduate School of Nuclear and Allied Sciences is a post-graduate school established by Ghana Atomic Energy Commission (GAEC) in collaboration with the University of Ghana, with support from the International Atomic Energy Agency (IAEA) to enhance human resource development for the peaceful use of nuclear and related technologies in Ghana and Africa.

== Facilities ==
=== Halls of residence ===
Halls of residence are provided for Graduate and Undergraduate Students. There are main halls of residence by the Government of Ghana and private halls of residence built on the campus by individuals and corporate bodies. Below are descriptions of the halls of residence; Commonwealth Hall, Legon Hall, Mensah Sarbah Hall, Volta Hall, Akuafo Hall and Jubilee Hall at the University of Ghana, Legon.

- Commonwealth Hall (the university's only male hall of residence). Known as the Vandals, the word VANDALS is an acronym for Vivacious, Affable, Neighborly, Devoted, Altruistic and Loyal. The students of Commonwealth Hall recognize themselves by calling out the word 'V-Mate' with a response word 'Sharp'. Often clad in red, as the colour of their identity, VANDALs pride themselves with unity.
- Legon Hall (The Legon Hall is the premier hall of the University of Ghana). Legon Hall was the first hall of residence to be built on the University of Ghana campus, thus referred to as the Premier Hall. The Hall is located at the Centre of the school close to the Balme Library. Just like the Mensah Sarbah Hall and the Akuafo Hall, Legon Hall serves as home for both male and female students, allowing for strong bonds between the sexes on the campus. The motto of the Legon hall is; "Cui Multidum Datum", which means "human relations with examples".
- Mensah Sarbah Hall (The Mensah Sarbah Hall is the first hall to be named after a hero of the nation; John Mensah Sarbah). The hall is recognised to host most of the best athletes on the university's campus.

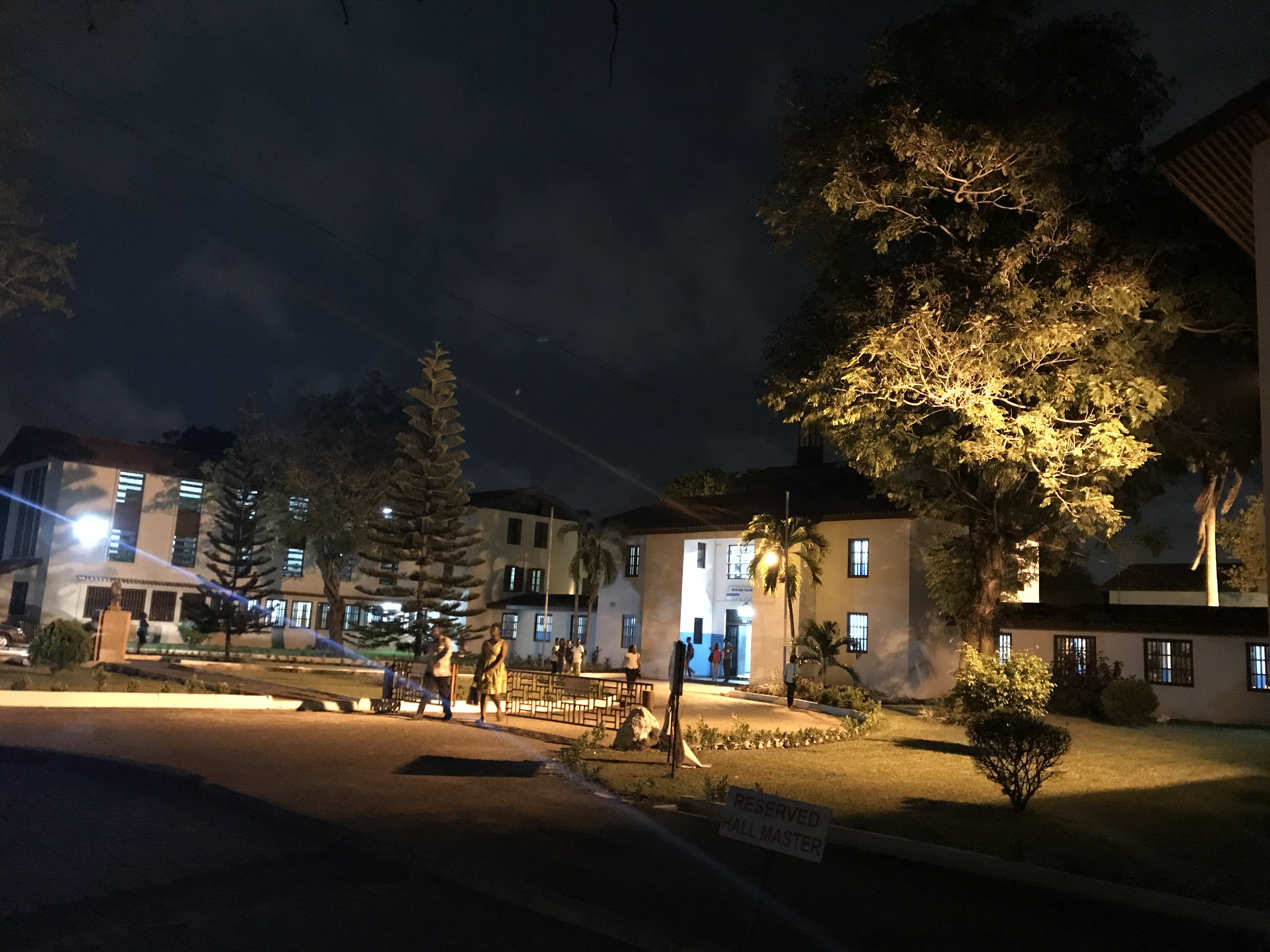
Entrance to Mensah Sarbah Hall, University of Ghana

- Volta Hall (the university's female-only hall of residence). It is the only all-female hall on the campus known for their discipline and neatness. The hall has churned out many respectable women such as the first female Chief Justice Georgina Theodora Woode.
- Akuafo Hall The word "akuafo" is an Akan word which means farmers. For this reason the hall is notably called the Farmers hall with a rich Ghanaian culture and tradition. The Akuafo Hall was the second hall of residence to be established in the University of Ghana. Their chieftaincy institution serves as a symbol of unity for students and also helps to promote and showcase the rich Ghanaian culture. The chief farmer and his queen mother are elected annually.
- Jubilee Hall. The Jubilee Hall is one of the halls of residence of the University of Ghana, Legon. The Jubilee hall is located on the south of the university campus, and opposite to the International Students Hostel. Jubilee Hall was built to commemorate the university's Golden Jubilee celebration in 1998. The hall was mainly built through support funds from alumni of the university.

The university has eight newly created halls of residence that were commissioned in 2011. They are:

- Alexander Kwapong Hall, named after Professor Alexander Kwapong a former Vice-Chancellor and Chairman of the Council of State.
- Jean Nelson Akah Hall, named after an alumnus, Jean Nelson Akah. It was inaugurated in July 2010. Its emblem shows a candle, a book and a pen to symbolize perseverance. It was designed by a final year Physics-Computer Science major student Raymond Sung-Seh Harrison. The motto of the hall, "Lux in Tenebris", which is Latin for "Light in Darkness", was suggested by Raymond's mate at the time, a lady by the name Muna Twerefour. The emblem was officially adopted on Tuesday, 2 April 2013.
- Hilla Limann Hall, the first of the University of Ghana Enterprise Limited (UGEL) hostels to be completed. It was inaugurated in July 2010, during which the Vice-Chancellor announced the decision to name it after Dr. Hilla Limann, a former President of the Republic of Ghana. Senior members of the university may be assigned as Fellows of the Hall by the Vice Chancellor. Students assigned/affiliated to the Hall form the Junior members. The Head of the Hall, Senior Tutor and fellow tutors serve as a body which helps with the governing of the Hall.
- Elizabeth Sey Hall, the second of the newer halls built by University of Ghana Enterprise Limited (UGEL) Hostels to be completed. It was inaugurated in July 2010 and was named after the first female graduate of the university, Elizabeth Frances Baaba Sey.
- Africa Union Hall, formerly called Pentagon, built by Social Security and National Insurance Trust (SSNIT).
- James Topp Nelson Yankah Hall, formerly known as Teachers Fund (TF) Hostel.
- Bani Hall, initially a private hostel and later had transferred to the status of a hall after the tenancy agreement with the university had elapsed.
- Evandy Hall, formerly Evandy Hostel and this was turned into a hall after the tenancy agreement with the university elapsed and ownership transferred to University authority.

=== Hostels ===
There are ten university hostels: the International Students Hostels (I and II), the Valco Trust Hostel, the Commonwealth Hall, the Akuafo Hall, the Mensah Sarbah Hall, the Legon Hall, the Limann Hall, the Kwapong Hall, the Elizabeth Sey Hall and the Jean Akah Nelson Hall. There are also private hostels, SSNIT Hostels (Ghana Hostels also known as Pentagon).

=== Bank, postal and other services ===
Ghana Commercial Bank, Standard Chartered Bank, Barclays Bank, Cal Bank, HFC Bank, Access Bank, Stanbic Bank, Fidelity Bank, Ecobank Ghana and Prudential Bank have branches on the Legon campus. There is a branch of the national postal service (Ghana Post) on campus. Other banks have ATMs on campus.

=== Roads usage and user charges ===
From 1 February 2014, all vehicles entering the University of Ghana's main campus, and also those using the road passing through the Staff Village of the university were required to pay charges. This was heavily criticized by public and students and was therefore suspended. Currently, various entry points into the campus require vehicle owners (typically staff and students) to obtain electronically scannable cards issued and authorized by the transport unit of the university.

== Notable alumni ==
- Barbara Frances Ackah-Yensu – active justice of the Supreme Court of Ghana (2022–)
- George Kingsley Acquah – Chief Justice of Ghana (2003–2007)
- Hutton Ayikwei Addy – Professor of Public Health, first Dean of the University for Development Studies Medical School
- Edward Doe Adjaho – Speaker of Parliament of Ghana (2013–2017)
- Sophia Ophilia Adjeibea Adinyira – justice of the Supreme Court of Ghana (2006–2019)
- Richard Adjei-Frimpong – active justice of the Supreme Court of Ghana (2024–)
- Issifu Omoro Tanko Amadu – Justice of the Supreme Court of Ghana (2022–)
- Peter Ala Adjetey – former speaker of the Parliament of Ghana (2001–05)
- Kwadwo Afari-Gyan – Chairman of the Electoral Commission of Ghana (1992–15)
- Francis Agbodeka – former professor of History
- Kissi Agyebeng – Special Prosecutor (2021–)
- Ama Ataa Aidoo – playwright
- Vida Akoto-Bamfo – Justice of the Supreme Court of Ghana (2009 – 2019)
- Ebenezer Akuete – Former Ghanaian diplomat
- Sophia Akuffo, 13th Chief Justice of Ghana
- Nana Addo Dankwa Akufo-Addo – President of Ghana (2017–present)
- Daniel Afedzi Akyeampong – mathematician
- Akwasi Afrifa – former member of parliament
- Mabel Agyemang née Banful (also Yamoa) - Chief Justice of the Turks and Caicos Islands, superior court judge for the Commonwealth Secretariat, served in the judiciaries of the governments of Ghana, The Gambia and Swaziland
- Nene Amegatcher – active Justice of the Supreme Court of Ghana (2018–2023)
- Paa Kwesi Amissah-Arthur – Vice President of the Republic of Ghana 2012–17
- Patrick Amoah-Ntim – Retired Ghanaian diplomat
- K. Y. Amoako – former UN Under-Secretary-General and Executive Secretary of the Economic Commission for Africa
- Harry Reginald Amonoo – Former Ghanaian diplomat
- David Anaglate – Journalist, Director General of the Ghana Broadcasting Corporation (1992–1995)
- Goodwin Tutum Anim – First Ghanaian Managing Director of the Ghana News Agency
- Yaw Appau – active Justice of the Supreme Court of Ghana (2015–)
- Anas Aremeyaw Anas – investigative journalist with Insight TWI: The World Investigates, CEO of Tiger Eye Private Investigations, executive director of The Crusading Guide
- Kwasi Anin-Yeboah – Chief Justice of Ghana (2019–2023)
- Joyce Rosalind Aryee - Minister of Education (1985–1987), Member of the National Defence Council (1993–2001), received Second Highest State Award, the Companion of the Order of the Volta in 2006
- Benjamin Teiko Aryeetey – Justice of the Supreme Court of Ghana (2009–2011)
- Yaw Asare, dramatist and playwright
- Yaw Darko Asare – active justice of the Supreme Court of Ghana (2024–)
- Samuel Kwame Adibu Asiedu – active justice of the Supreme Court of Ghana (2022–)
- Kofi Awoonor – Ghanaian poet and author whose work combined the poetic traditions of his native Ewe people and contemporary and religious symbolism to depict Africa during decolonization
- George Ayittey – economist, author, and president of the Free Africa Foundation, professor at American University, associate scholar at the Foreign Policy Research Institute.
- Elizabeth-Irene Baitie – award-winning writer of young adult fiction
- Sophia Rosetta Bernasko-Essah - Justice of the Supreme Court of Ghana (2026–)
- Josiah Ofori Boateng, Justice of the Supreme Court of Ghana (1999–2001); Electoral Commissioner of Ghana (1989–1992)
- Kwesi Botchwey – former law lecturer and finance minister of Ghana (1982–95).
- Mohamed Ibn Chambas – Executive Secretary of the Economic Community of West African States.
- Phyllis Christian – lawyer, CEO of ShawbellConsulting
- Alexander Adu Clerk – sleep medicine specialist and psychiatrist
- George C. Clerk – pioneer botanist and plant pathologist
- Nicholas T. Clerk – academic, public administrator and Presbyterian minister; former Rector, GIMPA
- Kwesi Dickson – former President of Methodist Church Ghana
- Agnes Dordzie – Justice of the Supreme Court of Ghana (2018–2022)
- Jones Victor Mawulorm Dotse – active justice of the Supreme Court of Ghana (2008–2023) and the Supreme Court of the Gambia (2008–2023)
- Kwabena Dufuor –former Finance Minister and former Governor of the Bank of Ghana.
- Komla Dumor – television news presenter for the BBC World, presenting BBC World News and Africa Business Report. 2003 winner of Journalist of the Year award given by the Ghana Journalist Association.
- Nana Effah-Apenteng – the Permanent Representative of Ghana to the United Nations between May 2000 and 2007.
- Ben Ephson - publisher and Managing Editor of the Daily Dispatch
- Akin Euba - Nigerian composer, musicologist and pianist, Andrew Mellon Professor of Music at the University of Pittsburgh
- Kwabena Frimpong-Boateng – cardiothoracic surgeon and former chief executive officer of the Korle Bu Teaching Hospital, first black African to perform heart transplant and established the National Cardiothoracic Centre, Minister for Environment, Science, Technology and Innovation (2017–present)
- Ethan Zuckerman – founder of Geekcorps (2000–)
- Ernest Gaewu – active Justice of the Supreme Court of Ghana (2023–)
- Nasiru Sulemana Gbadegbe – Justice of the Supreme Court of Ghana (2009–2020)
- Patrick R. D. Hayford – diplomat, former Ghana Ambassador to South Africa(1997–1999), Director of African Affairs in the Executive Office of United Nations (UN) Secretary-General Kofi Annan(1999–2005)
- Clemence Jackson Honyenuga – Justice of the Supreme Court of Ghana (2020–2022)
- Rosemary Hutton – geophysicist and pioneer of magnetotellurics (1954–1961)
- Ken Kanda – diplomat, the Permanent Representative of Ghana to the United Nations
- George Kingsley Koomson – active Justice of the Supreme Court of Ghana (2023–)
- Manuel Koranteng – journalist at the British Broadcasting Corporation (BBC)
- Nii Ashie Kotey – An academic and active justice of the Supreme Court of Ghana (2018–2023)
- Akua Kuenyehia – Vice-President, International Criminal Court (2003–Date)
- Henry Anthony Kwofie – active justice of the Supreme Court of Ghana (2024–)
- Cynthia Lamptey, Deputy Special Prosecutor (2018–)
- John Dramani Mahama – Vice-President of Ghana (2009–12) and President of Ghana (2012–17)
- Samuel Marful-Sau – active Justice of the Supreme Court of Ghana (2018–2021)
- Vicki Miles-LaGrange (born 1953) – Chief U.S. District Judge for the Western District of Oklahoma, first African-American woman to be U.S. attorney for the Western District of Oklahoma, and the first African-American female elected to the Oklahoma Senate
- John Evans Atta Mills – former Law professor and vice-president of Ghana (1997–2001), President of Ghana (2009–12)
- Tawiah Modibo Ocran – Judge of the Supreme Court of Ghana (2004–2008)
- Isaac Odame – Physician, University of Toronto professor, and medical researcher in sickle cell disease, thalassemia and other hematological disorders
- George Tawia Odamtten – Mycologist
- David Ofori-Adjei – elected to the Council of the Division of Clinical Pharmacology of the International Union of Pharmacology and Clinical Pharmacology in 2000
- Walter Samuel Nkanu Onnoghen - Chief Justice of Nigeria (2017–present)
- Aaron Mike Oquaye – former Minister of Communication (2005–09) and Member of Parliament for Dome-Kwabenya (2005 to present), Speaker of Parliament (2017–present)
- Faustina Oware-Gyekye – nursing leader and academic
- Rose Constance Owusu – Justice of the Supreme Court of Ghana (2008 – 2014)
- Bill Puplampu - occupational psychologist and Vice Chancellor of Central University (Ghana)
- Gabriel Pwamang – active Justice of the Supreme Court of Ghana (2015–)
- Nana Akuoko Sarpong - Omanhene of Agogo
- Ebenezer Sekyi-Hughes - Speaker of Parliament of Ghana (7 January 2005 – 6 January 2009)
- Samuel Ernest Quarm – retired diplomat
- Elizabeth Frances Sey (1927–1991) first female graduate of the University College of the Gold Coast and pioneering woman educator. A residence hall on the campus is named in her honour.
- Gertrude Torkornoo – Chief Justice of Ghana (2023–)
- Baldwyn Torto – Chemical ecologist
- Tsatsu Tsikata – former Chief Executive of the Ghana National Petroleum Corporation and Law lecturer at the University of Ghana.
- Togbe Afede XIV – Agbogbomefia of the Asogli State, President of Asogli Traditional Area and former President of the National House of Chiefs
- Nana Anima Wiafe-Akenten – linguist, the author of the first doctoral dissertation in the Twi language
- Kwasi Wiredu — philosopher
- Georgina Theodora Wood – first female Chief Justice of Ghana (since 2007).
- Kgosi Basadi Seipone III
- Mac Sarbah - Social entrepreneur and Innovator. Diversity, Equity, and Inclusion (DEI) Leader within the Global Health Office of the President at the Bill and Melinda Gates Foundation.

== Notable faculty ==
- Kate Adoo Adeku, academic and women's rights activist
- Isaac Owusu-Mensah, political scientist
- Nana Klutse, climate scientist
- Zonke Majodina, clinical psychologist and human rights worker.
- Philomena Nyarko, statistician
- Alexander Oppenheim (1968–1973), mathematician
- Faustina Oware-Gyekye, nurse-leader
- Elsie Effah Kaufmann, biomedical engineer and quiz mistress for the National Science and Maths Quiz
- Kwadwo Owusu, Director of the Centre for Climate Change and Sustainability Studies at the University.

== Controversy ==
The management of the university was labeled as 'insensitive' to the hardship caused by the COVID-19 pandemic after the school increased its facility user fees for 2020/21 academic year. It led to a protest on social media and the decision was later reversed. In recent years there has been reports of sexual misconduct levelled against several lecturers at the university which the university denied. An investigative documentary was produced by former victims of the sexual harassment which was uploaded to YouTube.

== UG Sports Stadium ==
The University of Ghana Sports Stadium is located in Accra. The venue, which has a capacity of 10,000, opened in 2024 by the Vice President of Ghana on 21 March. The stadium is used mostly for association football and rugby union. It also has an athletics track. The facility was built as a legacy of the school. It also marks the 75th Anniversary of the University.

== See also ==
- List of universities in Ghana
