= List of Kwame Nkrumah University of Science and Technology alumni =

This is a list of some notable alumni of Kwame Nkrumah University of Science and Technology.

== Academics ==
- Pamela Mbabazi
- John Owusu Gyapong
- Kwesi Akwansah Andam
- Esi Awuah
- Richard Tuyee Awuah
- Ernest Aryeetey
- William Otoo Ellis
- Eric Aboagye
- Jacob Plange-Rhule
- Priscilla Kolibea Mante
- Peter Twumasi, currently a professor
- Gladys Ama Quartey

== Arts ==
- Bright Tetteh Ackwerh
- Cephas Yao Agbemenu
- Betty Acquah
- El Anatsui
- George O. Hughes
- Ablade Glover
- Atta Kwami
- Ibrahim Mahama
- Constance Swaniker

== Diplomats ==
- Kofi Annan - former UN Secretary General
- Kwaku Aning -former Deputy Director of IAEA
- Emmanuel Bombande
- Kwame Bawuah-Edusei

== Engineering ==
- Thomas Mensah
- Benjamin Asante
- Alex Mould
- Clifford Braimah
- Selorm Adadevoh - Chief Executive Officer of MTN Ghana, a subsidiary of MTN Group

== Entertainment ==
- John Dumelo
- Chris Attoh
- Deborah Owusu-Bonsu
- Nikoletta Samonas
- Claudia Lumor

== Journalism ==
- David Anaglate
- Francisca Ashietey-Odunton
- Ameyaw Debrah
- Kwabena Sarpong-Anane

== Music ==
- DJ Aroma
- Nii Okai
- Mr Eazi
- Teephlow
- KODA
- Okyeame Kwame
- Alfred P. Addaquay
- Blakk Rasta

== Politics ==
- Aliu Mahama
- Edward Kwame Wiredu
- Albert Abongo
- Nana Konadu Agyeman Rawlings
- Hackman Owusu-Agyeman
- Felix Owusu-Adjapong
- Paul Victor Obeng
- Yaw Osafo-Marfo
- Joseph Yieleh Chireh
- Kwabena Agyapong
- Nayon Bilijo
- Patricia Appiagyei
- Matthew Opoku Prempeh
- Francisca Oteng-Mensah
- Zita Okaikoi
- Kwaku Kwarteng
- Dan Botwe
- Samuel Abu Jinapor
- Joseph Anokye
- Della Sowah
- Joseph Amenowode
- Kofi Dzamesi
- Joe Oteng-Adjei
- Richard W. Anane
- Emmanuel Armah Kofi Buah
- Nii Armah Ashitey
- Kwabena Twum-Nuamah
- Gifty Oware-Aboagye
- Alex Tettey-Enyo
- Mubarak Mohammed Muntaka
- Samira Bawumia
- Moses Asaga
- Emmanuel Kyeremateng Agyarko
- Kwame Awuah-Darko

== Religion ==
- Isaac Ababio
- Samuel Koranteng-Pipim
- Francis Amenu

== Royalty ==
- King Tackie Teiko Tsuru II
- Nana Otuo Siriboe II

== Military ==
- George Boakye

== Public Service ==
- Georgina Opoku Amankwah
- Alex Dodoo

== Sports ==
- Daniel Sam (badminton)
