= Andam =

Andam is a Ghanaian or Filipino surname that may refer to the following people:

- Aba Andam (born 1948), Ghanaian physicist
- Kenneth Andam (born 1976), Ghanaian sprinter
- Kwesi Akwansah Andam (died 2007), Ghanaian academician
- Zorayda Andam (born c. 1980), Filipino lawyer, beauty queen, television host and news anchor
