= Fante people =

Ethnic group in Ghana

Fante
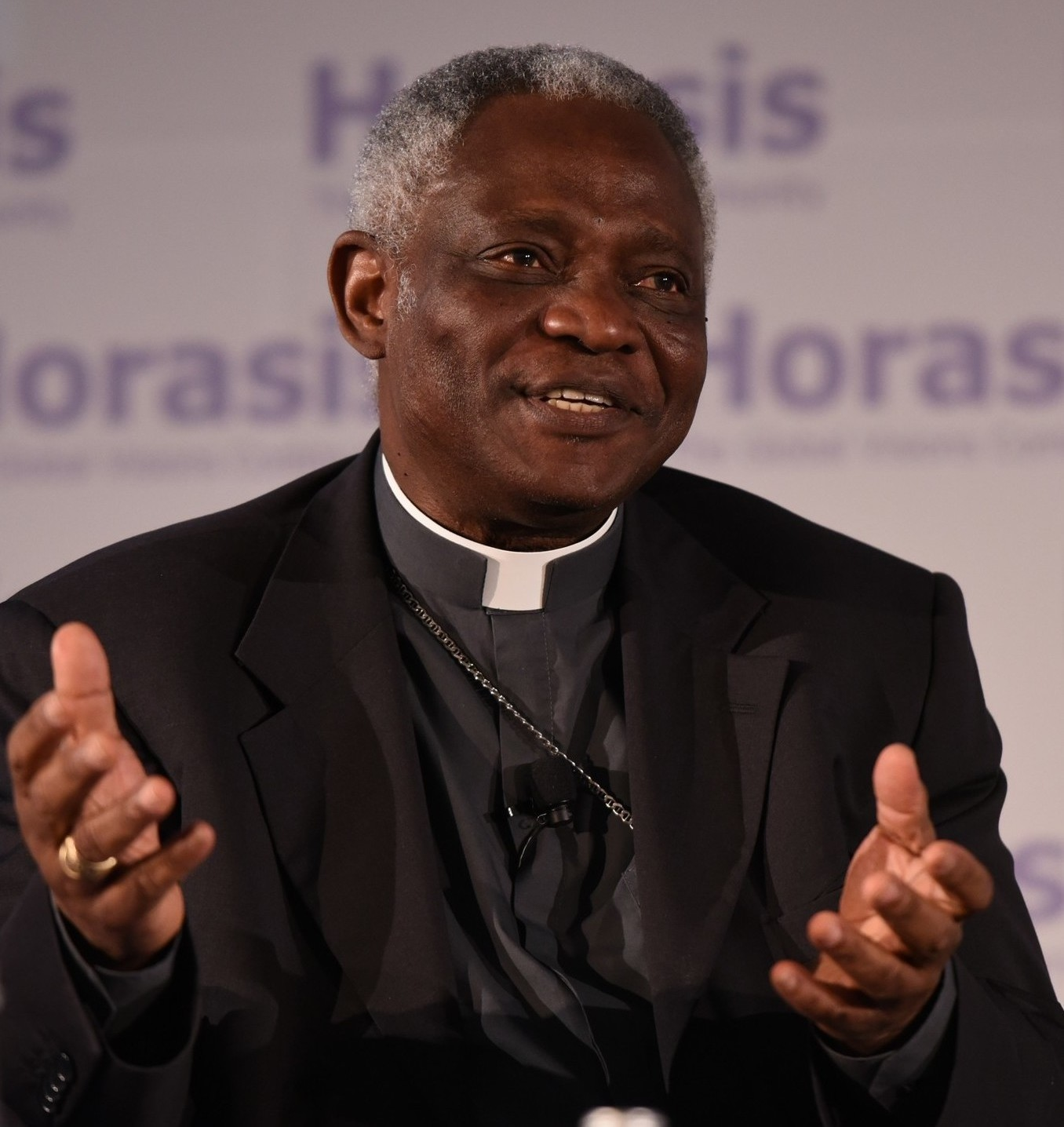

Total population
- ~5,500,000

Regions with significant populations
- Central and Western Regions (Ghana)

Languages
- Fante; French; English

Religion
- Christianity; Akan religion; Islam; Guan spirituality

Related ethnic groups
- Akan, Guan

The modern Mfantsefo or Fante ("Fanti" is an older spelling) confederacy is a combination of Akan people and aboriginal Guan people. The Fante people are mainly located in the Central and Western Regions of Ghana, West Africa, occupying the forest and coastal areas. Their land stretches from the eastern part of western region in the west to Gomoa in the east. The Fante can be broadly categorized into two groups – the Borbor/Boka Fante (Akan ancestry) and the Etsii Fante (Guan ancestry). Over the last half-century, Fante communities have been established as far as Gambia, Liberia, Côte d'Ivoire and even Angola due to fishing expeditions. Major Fante cities and towns in modern Ghana include Cape Coast, Saltpond, Sekondi, Elmina, Agona Swedru, Mankessim, Winneba, Shama, Apam, Komenda, Kasoa and Anomabo.

== History ==
According to their oral traditions, the Borbor Fante, an intrusive group, migrated from Tekyiman in the Brong-Ahafo Region of Ghana and settled in Fanteland. They initially established themselves in Kwaman before moving to Mankessim. After residing in Mankessim for a period of time, they went on to establish the states of Abora, Ekumfi, Enyanmaim, Mankessim, and Nkusukum in the surrounding areas. The burial ground near Mankessim, where the remains of the three leaders of the migrants (Oburumankoma, Odapagyan, and Oson) were interred, became known as Nananom Pow, the most sacred place in the Borbor Fante territory. The Borbor Fante, who share a common language (Fante) and cultural traits, inhabit a concentrated area within Fanteland. The historical and spiritual capital of Borbor Mfantseman is Mankessim (Oman kesi mu).

The Etsii Fante states, which include Eguafo, Fetu, Asebu, are positioned from west to east. Among the others are Oguaa, Elmina, Moree, and Otsir. The majority of the people in these states do not have migration stories. According to their oral traditions, their ancestors either descended from the heavens or emerged from the sea, rivers, or dense forests. This is a proverbial way of saying they have lived on the mountain, then arrived in their current town by sea, where they lived in hunter-gathering times. Some lived in caves. Eguafo, which is known as Oman Panyin in Fanteland and is the oldest state, is claimed to have been founded by people who descended from the heavens in a large brass pan called Ayewa Kese. The Asebu people claim that their ancestors emerged from the earth, while the Sonkwa people believe that their forefathers emerged from a sacred grove nearby.

The Fante people are of heterogeneous Guan and Akan ancestry. Therefore, with the modern Fante Confederacy, it would be wrong to identify Fante as an Akan group or a Guan group only. However, the Fante are one of the largest groups in Ghana. Despite the rapid growth of the Ashanti Empire and constant war with the Ashanti and allied Dutch in the mid-1800s, the Fante have always retained their state to this day and fought numerous wars to protect their northern flank from Ashanti incursions and several other wars with the Dutch and English. This led the Fante people to be both traders of enslaved war captives (notably the Asante) to Europeans as well as victims of the slave trade, who were sold to Europeans following capture by their opponents during military defeats. Fante cultural influence is prominent in the British and Dutch West Indies, where enslaved Fante people disembarked. Currently, they number about 4.5 million, which is about 13% of modern Ghana's total population. Inheritance and succession to public office among both the Etsii and Borbor Fantes are traditionally determined by matrilineal descent, a culture the Etsii (Guan) Fantes adopted from Borbor (Akan) Fantes. This culture is also common among other Akan peoples.

However, Fante males of fighting age traditionally belonged to their father's Asafo company.

When the Portuguese arrived in the 15th century, the Fante prevented them from venturing inland and leased properties for Portuguese trading missions. But when the Portuguese objected to Fante rules and regulations, the Fante expelled them after a series of skirmishes and battles. Thereafter the Dutch arrived, followed by the British. The Fante served as middlemen in the commerce between the interior and British and Dutch traders on the coast. The Fante became a very wealthy and prosperous state upon their dealings with the various European powers.

In the early 18th century, the modern Fante Confederacy was formed, with the aim of establishing themselves as a nation to be taken seriously by their European counterparts and the withdrawal of Europeans from Fante lands. The Fantes for centuries already had a very complex system of federal government in which various states co-exist in an alliance. Each Fante state is led by a Paramount Chief. However, in times of war, they always mobilized a Union army often commanded by the Paramount Chief of Abura. Facing such stern resistance, the Portuguese, Germans, Swedish and Danes after many decades vacated all trading forts in Mfantseman. The Dutch decided to stay, leading to many wars between Fante and the Dutch, who failed to colonize them. In 1844, having been weakened by constant battles with the Ashanti and their allies the Dutch, the Fante Confederacy signed the Bond of 1844 with the British. The British left Cape Coast and moved the capital of Gold Coast to Accra as a response to the resistance movement. The modern Fante Confederacy was established in response to the threat of Europeans attempting to colonize vast areas within modern-day Ghana. In 1844, a bond was signed between the Fante Confederacy, on behalf of the Gold Coast, and the British, allowing the Gold Coast to gain total independence without war one hundred years later.

Several Ashanti-Fante Wars followed, due to the Ashanti quest for direct trade routes to the coast. On one occasion, the Fante were aided by the British, who nevertheless managed to seriously weaken the strong Fante confederation established between 1868 and 1872, believing it a threat to their hegemony on the coast. The British and the Dutch took sides in these Ashanti-Fante wars, with the British supporting the Fante and the Dutch supporting the Ashanti.

While Mfantsefo are known widely to be a peaceful people, in times of war they rally for the common defence. Due to wars with the Dutch and allied Ashanti, the combined strength of the Fante Union Army numbered more than thirty thousand men in 1844. It was under the command of Amfo Otu, Paramount Chief of Abura, that they laid siege to their own town of Elmina and its European castle, eventually expelling the Dutch from their stronghold in Elmina.

== Notable Fante people ==
Fantes have produced numerous notable people in Ghana, including:

- Gisela Abbam, first Black chair of the British Science Association & General Pharmaceutical Council
- Isaac Kobina Abban, former chief justice of Ghana
- Marian Ewurama Addy, first female full professor of Natural Science in Ghana and the face of NSMQ
- James Kwegyir Aggrey, pioneer of African education, one of the most influential figures in African education and Pan-Africanism
- Jane Naana Opoku Agyemang, first female vice president of Ghana, first woman to become a vice chancellor of a public university in Ghana, University of Cape Coast
- Ama Ata Aidoo, Africa's first female playwright
- Francis Allotey, first Ghanaian to obtain a doctorate in mathematical sciences, earned in 1966
- Nana Aba Appiah Amfo, first female vice chancellor of University of Ghana
- Kwesi Amissah-Arthur, former vice president of Ghana and former governor of Bank of Ghana
- Aba Bentil Andam, first female associate professor of physics in Ghana
- Kwesi Akwansah Andam, first Black African to become a fellow of the International Association for Bridge and Structural Engineering, former vice chancellor of Kwame Nkrumah University of Science and Technology
- Kofi Annan, former UN secretary general
- kow Nkensen Arkaah, former vice president of Ghana
- Esi Awuah, first female vice chancellor of University of Energy and Natural Resources
- Ottobah Cugoano, abolitionist and natural rights philosopher
- Joseph W.S. de Graft-Johnson, former vice president of Ghana
- Kwadwo Egyir (c. 1700–1779)
- Ekow Eshun, British journalist and writer
- George Ekem Ferguson, cartographer who created a detailed map of the Gold Coast (now Ghana)
- Robert K. A. Gardiner, Ghanaian civil servant, university professor and economist
- Paa Grant, founding father of the first political party in Gold Coast (now Ghana), UGCC
- J. E. Casely Hayford (1866–1930), journalist, lawyer and politician
- Ebenezer Begyina Sekyi Hughes, former speaker of the Parliament of Ghana
- Sam Jonah, ex-CEO of AngloGold Ashanti
- Nana Klutse, first female full professor of Physics in Ghana
- Kobina Arku Korsah, first chief justice of Ghana
- Afua Kyei, chief financial officer of the Bank of England
- Wode Maya, Ghanaian YouTuber
- John Atta Mills, former president and former vice president of Ghana
- Paa Kwesi Nduom, businessman, entrepreneur
- Charlotte Osei, first female electoral commissioner of Ghana
- Mensa Otabil, founder and general overseer of International Central Gospel Church
- John Mensah Sarbah, first African lawyer of the Gold Coast, one of the first Africans to be called to the Bar in England in 1887
- Efua Sutherland, "mother" of Ghanaian theatre, architect of Anansegoro
- Alex Quaison-Sackey, first Black African to serve as president of the United Nations General Assembly)
- Jacob Wilson Sey, first Indigenous multimillionaire in the Gold Coast and early independence movement supporter; key figure and the financier of the Aborigines' Rights Protection Society
- Gertrude Torkornoo, former chief justice of Ghana
- Peter Turkson, first Ghanaian cardinal of the Roman Catholic Church

== Family names ==
One of the social contexts of names among the Akan, including the Fante, is that they are used as social tags to indicate personal and group identity. This is so with family names derived from 12 Ntoro patrilineal clans of the fathers that are given to children. Each of the 12 Ntoro patrilineal clans has its particular family names. It is thus possible to use a person's name to trace his/her patrilineal clan. Children who trace their genealogy to one patrilineal father may therefore share similar family names. Typical family names include Yankah, Osam, Aidoo, Essien, Annan etc.

There have also been innovations as a result of westernization, education and foreign religion, with multiple names developed out of this phenomenon. Some Fante names were translated literally into English and have endured as family names. Since the Fantes by virtue of living on the coast were the first to be in contact with the Europeans and traded, intermarried and lived with them for more than 400 years, it is inevitable that Fante names show a greater degree of western influence compared to those of tribes in the hinterland. Examples of such anglicised transformational name are:

- Dua (lit tree/board) – Wood
- Kuntu (blanket ) – son of Kuntu Blankson
- Kumi ba (child of Kumi) – Kumson or Koomson
- Kwei ba (child of Kwei) – Quayson, Quayeson, Kweison or Kwaeson
- Akorɔma (hawk) – Hawkson
- Nyameba – Godson
- ɛbo (stone) – Rockson

Accordingly, some family names can also be identified by the suffix, for example:

- -son as in Yawson
- -ful, as in Arkorful
- -ney, as in Biney

Otherwise, Fante (Akan) typological family names indicate various contexts. They may be circumstantial, manner of birth, theophorous, weird names, insinuating and proverbial names, gang and nicknames, status, occupational, professional, religious, matrimonial, and Western names. There can be a combination of two or more of these typological names.

== Naming system ==
Fantes use a system of giving the first name to a child based on the day of the week that the child was born:

| Day | Male name | Female name |
|---|---|---|
| Dwowda (Monday) | Kodwo, Kojo, Joojo/Jojo | Adwoa/Adwowa, Ewuradwoa |
| Benada (Tuesday) | Kobina, Kobby, Ebo | Abena, Araba, Ewurabena |
| Wukuda (Wednesday) | Kweku, Abeiku, Kuuku, Yooku | Ekua, Kuukua, Ewurakua |
| Yawda (Thursday) | Yaw, Ekow, Kow, Kwaw | Aba, Baaba, Abayaa |
| Fida (Friday) | Kofi, Fiifi, Yoofi | Efua, Effie, Ewurafua |
| Memenda (Saturday) | Kwame, Kwamena, Ato | Ama, Ewurama, Amba |
| Kwesida (Sunday) | Kwesi, Siisi | Esi, Ewuresi/Ewuraesi |

Children may also be named according to the sequence in which they are born. The names given are as follows:

| Position | Male name | Female name |
|---|---|---|
| First | Piesi | Piesi |
| Second | Manu | |
| Third | Mensa, Ansa | Mansa, Naana |
| Fourth | Anan | Maanan |
| Fifth | Enum | - |
| Sixth | Esia/Nsia | - |
| Seventh | Esuon | - |
| Eighth | Awotwe | - |
| Ninth | Ackon | |
| Tenth | Bedu | Beduwa |

Twins may also be named according to the sequence in which they are born. The names given are as follows:

| First twin | Second twin |
|---|---|
| <Given day name> Payin | <Given day name> Kaakra |

The next child born immediately after the birth of the twins may be given a name, such as:

| Example male | Example female |
|---|---|
| Kojo Tewia or Kojo Tewiah | Ekua Tewia or Ekua Tewiah |

== Origin ==
According to oral tradition the Fante separated from the other Akan groups in present-day Brong Ahafo around 1250 AD. This act became the origin of their name, "Fa-atsew" meaning "half that left". The Fante left their Akan brethren at Krako, present day Techiman in the Bono East of Ghana, and became their own distinct Akan group. The Fante people were led by three great warriors known as Obrumankoma, Odapagyan and Oson (the whale, the eagle and the elephant respectively).

According to tradition, Obrumankoma and Odapagya died on this exodus and were embalmed and carried the rest of the way. Oson led the people to what would become Mankessim in 1252. Legend has it that the Fante's chief priest, Komfo Amona, planted a spear in the ground when they reached the location of the settlement. The spear is called the Akyin-Enyim, meaning "in front of god". The place became the meeting place for the Fante elders and the head fetish priest when discussing important matters.

The first Omanhen (king) of Mankessim was installed here, and later kingmakers would visit the site for consultation. According to the Fante, the spear cannot be removed by mortal hands. The land the Fante reached was initially called Adoakyir by its existing inhabitants, which the Fante called "Etsi-fue-yifo" meaning people with bushy hair. The Fante conquered these people and renamed the settlement Oman-kesemu, meaning large town. The name has evolved into the current name, Mankessim.

The Fante settled the land as their first independent kingdom, and buried Obrumakankoma and Odapagya in a sacred grove called Nana-nom-pow. Komfo Amona also planted the limb of a tree he had brought from the Akan homeland in Krako to see if a place was good for settlement. The day after the priest planted the limb, the people found a tree starting to grow. The tree was named Ebisa-dua, or the consulting tree, and its location is today one of the most important shrines in Mankessim.

- Fante dialect
- Elmina

== Culture ==
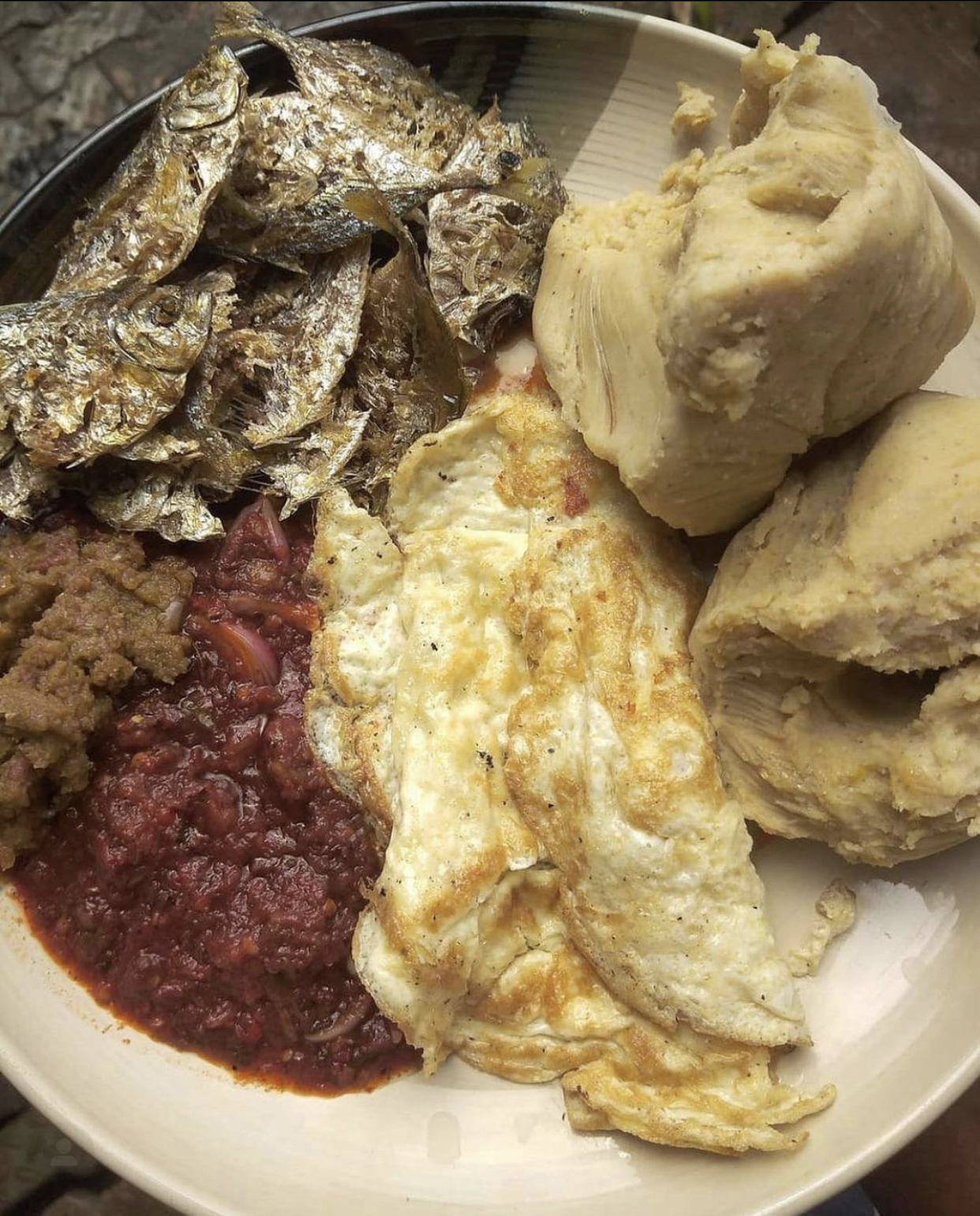
Fante Kenkey with fried fish and egg

The Fante engage in farming, fishing and animal husbandry. Fante society is matrilineal.

A majority of the Fante adhere to Christianity or their traditional beliefs. A minority profess Sunni Islam.

Fante people are known for their cuisine. Food plays an integral part of Fante culture and take pride of place. Their traditional food includes kenkey, banku (etsew) that is eaten with fish including tilapia and other seafood, fresh pepper and vegetables. Many Fantes from the interior also traditionally eat yam and cocoyams (ampesie) and fufu. The Oguaa Fetu Afahye (an annual traditional festival celebrated in Cape Coast) is a yam harvest festival that was previously celebrated in the Bono Kingdom and was brought to the coast during the exodus. Fetu Afahye Festival is one of the most important festivals celebrated by the Fante ethnic group. It is celebrated as a remembrance of a historic disease outbreak, to keep the towns clean and to prevent another epidemic.

The Fante people are the largest subgroup of the Akan people, with the Ashanti and Akuapem being the second and third largest groups, respectively.

Fantes over the course of the years developed a unique blend of culinary dishes that are now eaten all over Ghana including corned-beef stew, Ghana jollof, Ghana meat pie, ice kenkey, Atadwe milk, abodoo, jollof rice, foam and many others.
