= Edmund Fianko =

Ghanaian electronic communications engineer and public official

Rev. Ing. Edmund Yirenkyi Fianko
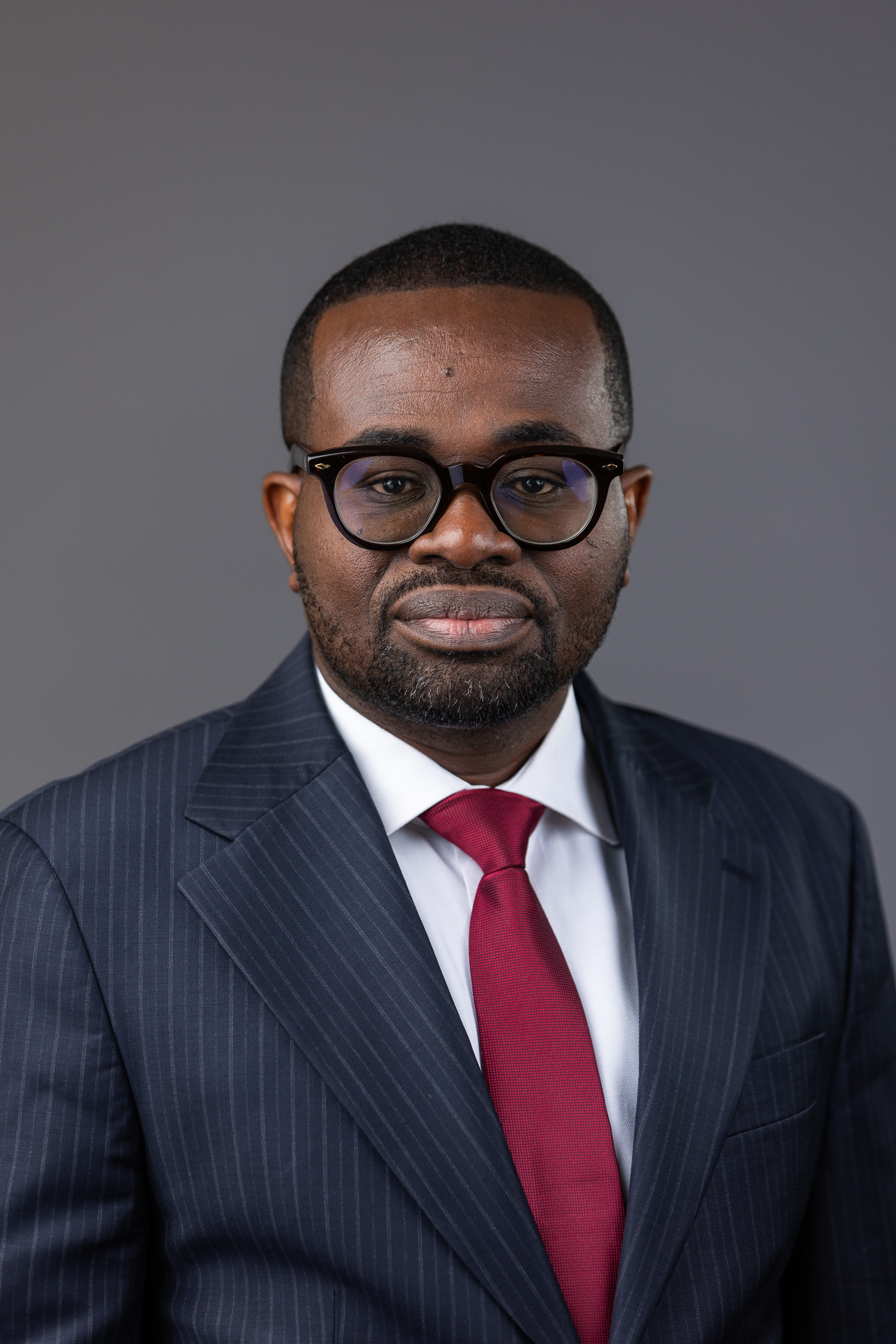
- Portrait of Fianko in 2025

Director-General of the National Communications Authority
- Incumbent
- Assumed office January 2025
- President: John Mahama
- Minister: Samuel N. George
- Preceded by: Joseph Anokye

Personal details
- Born: March 14, 1981 (age 45)
- Citizenship: Ghanaian
- Spouse: Adwoa Boadua Yirenkyi-Fianko
- Children: 2
- Education: Kwame Nkrumah University of Science and Technology (BSc); Buckinghamshire New University (MSc); Universidad Católica de Murcia (MPhil)
- Profession: Electronic communications engineer, regulatory official

Edmund Yirenkyi Fianko (born 14 March 1981) is a Ghanaian electronic communications engineer and public official who has served as the Director-General of the National Communications Authority (NCA) since January 2025. Before his nomination, he was the Director of Engineering at the Authority, a position he attained after holding various senior technical and regulatory roles since joining the NCA in 2004.

== Early life and education ==
Edmund Yirenkyi Fianko was born on 14 March 1981. He received his secondary education at Pope John Senior High School and Minor Seminary in the Eastern Region of Ghana. He later earned a Bachelor of Science degree in Electrical and Electronic Engineering from the Kwame Nkrumah University of Science and Technology (KNUST). He subsequently obtained a Master of Science degree in Communications Management from Buckinghamshire New University in the United Kingdom, and a Master of Philosophy degree in Applied Business Leadership and Management from the Universidad Católica San Antonio de Murcia, Spain.

== Career ==
Fianko joined the National Communications Authority (NCA) in 2004 as a national service person after completing his undergraduate education. Following his national service, he remained with the Authority as a Frequency Management Officer. His early responsibilities focused on radio frequency spectrum planning, licensing, monitoring, and regulatory enforcement in Ghana’s telecommunications and broadcasting sectors.

Between 2010 and 2016, as Secretary to the Digital Broadcasting Migration Committee, he contributed to Ghana’s digital terrestrial television migration programme, participating in the technical planning and implementation of national digital broadcasting standards that later informed regional frameworks within the Economic Community of West African States (ECOWAS).

In June 2021, Fianko was appointed Acting Head of the Engineering Division of the NCA and was confirmed as Director of the Engineering Division in January 2024. In this role, he oversaw radio frequency spectrum management, technical regulation of electronic communications networks, and engineering supervision of broadcasting services nationwide.

In January 2025, President John Dramani Mahama appointed Fianko as Acting Director-General of the National Communications Authority, succeeding Joseph Anokye. His appointment was notable for being the first elevation of a career technical officer of the Authority to its highest executive position.

== International roles ==
Since 2019, Fianko has been a member of the Technical Advisory Committee of the International Telecommunications Union (ITU) Policy and Regulatory Initiative for Digital Africa (PRIDA). He has also served as chairman of the African Telecommunications Union Task Group on Development of Spectrum Recommendations for Rural Connectivity since 2020. In 2022, he began serving as Alternate Director for Ghana on the Board of Directors of the Regional African Satellite Communication Organization (RASCOM).

In 2022, Fianko was elected to the Radio Regulations Board (RRB) of the International Telecommunication Union (ITU) for the 2023–2026 term. The Board is responsible for overseeing the application of the ITU Radio Regulations governing global radio frequency spectrum and satellite orbit usage. He became the second Ghanaian to be elected to the RRB. The first being John Ray Tandoh, who was elected to the Board in 1998.

== Personal life ==
Fianko is married to Dr. Adwoa Boadua Yirenkyi-Fianko, a professor at the Department of Management Science of the Ghana Institute of Management and Public Administration (GIMPA). The couple have two children.

Fianko is an ordained minister of the Methodist Church Ghana.

== See also ==
- National Communications Authority
- Telecommunications in Ghana

Government offices
Preceded by Joe Anokye	Director-General of the National Communications Authority; 2025–present	Incumbent
