= Paarock VanPercy =

Ghanaian investment banker and telecommunications regulator

Paarock Asuman VanPercy
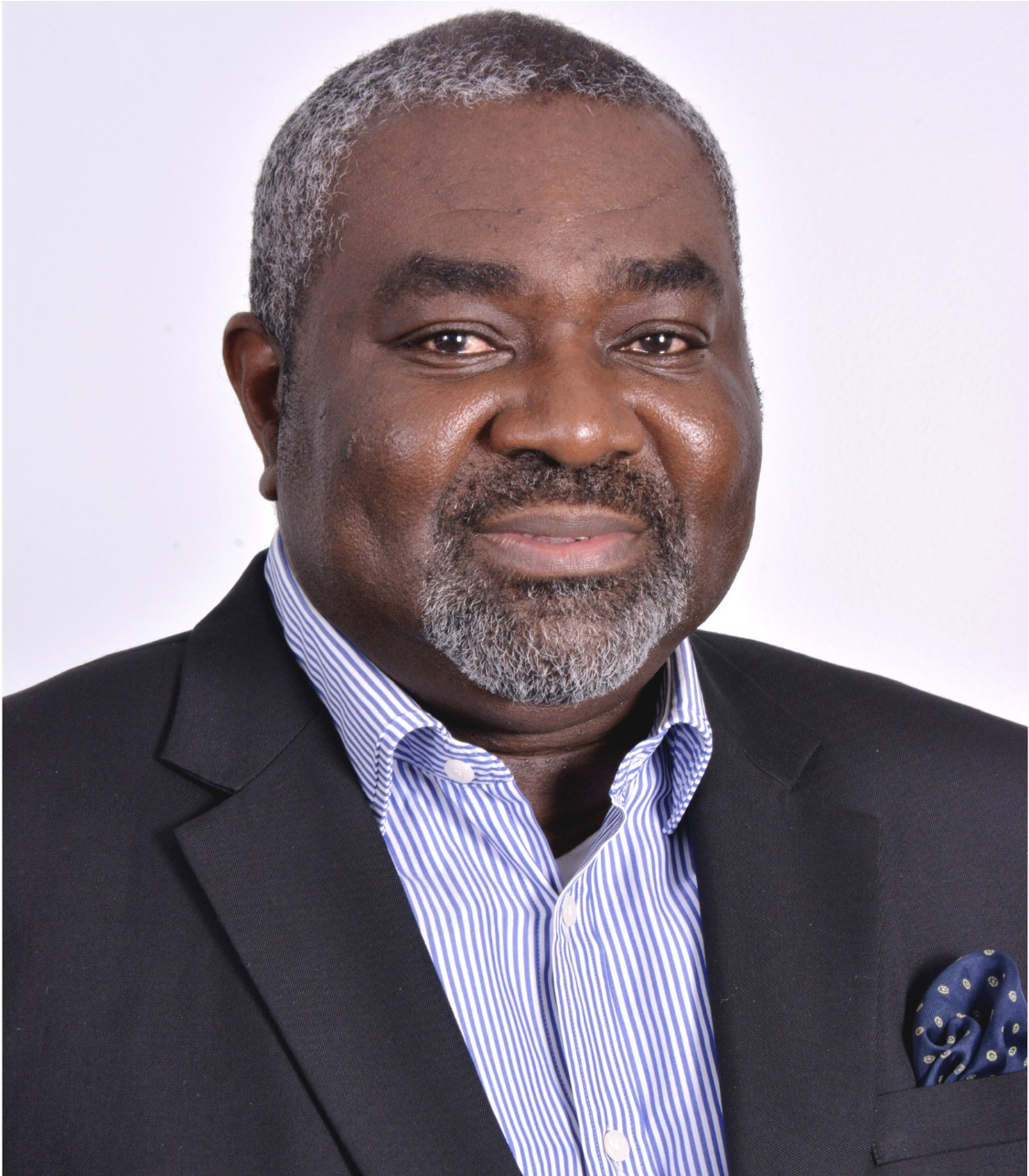

Director-General, National Communications Authority
- In office 1 June 2010 – 31 May 2015
- President: John Mahama
- Preceded by: Bernard Aidoo Forson
- Succeeded by: William Tevie

Personal details
- Born: 1959 (age 66–67)
- Citizenship: Ghanaian
- Parents: Rock Van Percy; Hagar Edna Baidoo
- Education: University of Ghana (BA)
- Occupation: Investment banker, corporate executive

Paarock Asuman VanPercy is a Ghanaian investment banker and former government official who served as Director-General of the National Communications Authority (NCA) from 2010 to 2015. He was also non-executive chairman of CalBank from 2010 to 2020 and previously served as managing associate at AfriCapital Associates, a financial advisory firm in Accra.

== Early life and education ==
Paarock VanPercy’s parents were Rock Asuman VanPercy and Hagar Edna Abaidoo. His father, Rock, ran for parliament in the 1969 Ghanaian parliamentary election as a member of the National Alliance of Liberals but was unsuccessful.

VanPercy obtained a Bachelor of Arts degree in Philosophy from the University of Ghana. He later trained as a chartered accountant in the United Kingdom and became a Fellow of the Institute of Chartered Accountants in England and Wales (ICAEW).

== Career ==
VanPercy began his professional career in accountancy and corporate finance, working in both the United Kingdom and Ghana. He served as Audit Manager at Unilever Ghana Limited before transitioning into investment banking and development finance.

He later held senior executive roles including Head of Corporate Finance at Merchant Bank (Ghana) Limited, General Manager of the Venture Fund Management Company, and Ghana Country Director of the Commonwealth Development Corporation (CDC). In these roles, he was involved in corporate restructuring, private equity investments, and development finance initiatives across multiple sectors and African markets.

In December 1999, VanPercy was appointed to the board of CalBank PLC. He later served as Chairman of the bank, a position he held from March 2010 until June 2020, overseeing board governance during a period of institutional growth and regulatory change within Ghana’s banking sector. VanPercy was also managing associate of AfriCapital Associates, a business and financial advisory firm in Accra. He held other directorships with the Ghana Leasing Company, the Liberian Bank for Development and Investment, and AfriHoldings; a Mauritius registered company.

VanPercy was appointed Director-General of the National Communications Authority on 1 June 2010, succeeding Bernard Aidoo Forson.

During his tenure at the NCA, regulatory and institutional reforms he oversaw included a nationwide SIM card registration exercise, the implementation of Mobile Number Portability, the revision of the National Numbering Plan, the deployment of automated radio spectrum monitoring systems, the decentralisation of NCA operations to regional offices, and the development of national communication mast guidelines in 2012. The Authority also strengthened quality-of-service monitoring frameworks under his leadership.

His term as Director-General ended on 31 May 2015, and he was succeeded by William Tevie.

== See also ==
- National Communications Authority
- Telecommunications in Ghana

Government offices
| Preceded by Bernard Aidoo Forson | Director-General of the National Communications Authority; 2010–2015 | Succeeded by William Tevie |
