= Aboagye =

Aboagye is a surname of Ghanaian origin. Notable people with the surname include:

- Clifford Aboagye (born 1995), Ghanaian footballer
- Eric Aboagye, Ghanaian oncologist
- Felix Aboagye (born 1975), Ghanaian footballer
- Kwasi Sintim Aboagye (1919–?), Ghanaian politician, member of parliament during the first republic
- P. A. K. Aboagye (1925–2001), Ghanaian poet, writer and historian

== See also ==
- Lawrence Aboagye Okai (1932–2017), Ghanaian military officer
