= Philip Quaque =

Gold Coast missionary and Anglican vicar

The Reverend Philip Quaque
- Born: Kweku; 1741; Cape Coast, Gold Coast
- Died: 17 October 1816 (aged 74–75); Cape Coast, Gold Coast
- Burial place: Cape Coast Castle
- Education: University of Oxford (M.A.)
- Occupations: Clergyman; Missionary
- Spouse: Catherine Blunt (m. 1765)
- Parent: Birempong Cudjo (father)

Ecclesiastical career
- Church: Church of England; Society for the Propagation of the Gospel
- Ordained: England, 1765

Philip Quaicoe (1741 – 17 October 1816) was the first African to be ordained as a minister by the Church of England.

== Biography ==
Born in Cape Coast, Ghana, then known as (Gold Coast) and named Kweku, he was said to be the son of Birempong Cudjo, a caboceer or chief's agent in Cape Coast. In 1754, Kweku was one of three Fante children taken to England for education by a missionary from the Society for the Propagation of the Gospel, the Rev. Thomas Thompson, M.A. (Cantab) the first Anglican missionary to West Africa.

Of the three children, Thomas Cobbers died in 1758, while William Cudjoe suffered a mental breakdown and died in 1766. Kweku fared better. The two brothers were baptised at St Mary's Church, Islington in London on 7 January 1759, which they had attended for four years. Kweku took the name Philip. He studied theology at the University of Oxford and in 1765 was ordained in the Church of England. Phillip Quaque was the first African to be ordained as a minister of the Church of England. The same year, he married Catherine Blunt, an English woman, and the two returned to Cape Coast the following year.

The Royal African Company employed Quaque as the chaplain at Cape Coast Castle. He set up a small school in his own house, "especially for the training of Mulatto children who were growing in large numbers", and attempted to work as a missionary, but having forgotten most of his native tongue, Fante, he was unable to make any conversions and experienced difficulty connecting with the natives. He married twice more, these times to African women, and in 1784 sent his two children for education in London. He was a co-founder of the philanthropic group, ‘Torridzonian Society’ that fundraised for educational causes.

== Letters ==
Quaque wrote a series of letters to the Society for the Propagation of the Gospel, London from 1765 to 1811 telling of his successes, trials, and hardships during his time at Cape Coast Castle. These letters also depict a colorful and insightful image of life on the West African coast during his time there, such as the workings of African politics and territorial and trade relations. He tells of a number of things including the large number of deaths of Europeans shortly after their arrival, including the death of his first wife in 1766. Most of his letters speak mainly of his baptisms, paying special attention to those that included "others," or non-mulatto children. Though his school was initially "for the instruction of mulatto children only of both sexes," Quaque did eventually begin taking in African children. This did not, however, negate his disapproval of many aspects of their (and technically his) culture, including their language (which he used to speak), their religion, and their communalist practices.

Through his letters, particularly the one dated 1767, we get a thorough sense of the difficulty of Quaque's job as a missionary and how it conflicted with the traditionally polytheistic society he was living in. Also very telling through his letters is the influence of the endeavors of European nations to gain control, or at least an advantage, along the coast. In his letter dated July 30, 1775, he mentions the resulting bloodshed of a conflict, which he later mediated, between the local Dutch allies and his own townspeople. Such conflicts, as well as competition with the slave trade and the American Revolution, play a large role in the number of factors behind Quaque's supposedly limited success. Yet for these reasons, many grant Quaque glory for the number of baptisms he was able to perform, as well as the fact that he consistently stayed in touch with the Society over the course of several decades, even into his state of illness, despite the London headquarters only sending him 3 letters in response during his entire time stationed there.

Quaque received much criticism from many sides. In one of his letters he speaks of the harsh discrimination by Africans towards Europeans, and expresses that he himself even experiences it, regardless of his African descent. On the European side, he was criticized for becoming too involved in the coastal society, largely in part due to his marriages to local women, and the interpretation of his letters to not have been dissociated from his own culture.

== Death and legacy ==
Philip Quaque died in 1816 in Cape Coast, aged 75 years. He was buried in the Cape Coast Castle courtyard. The Cape Coast school he established in 1766 was named the Philip Quaque Boys School in his memory.
