= Joseph Anokye =

Ghanaian geodetic engineer

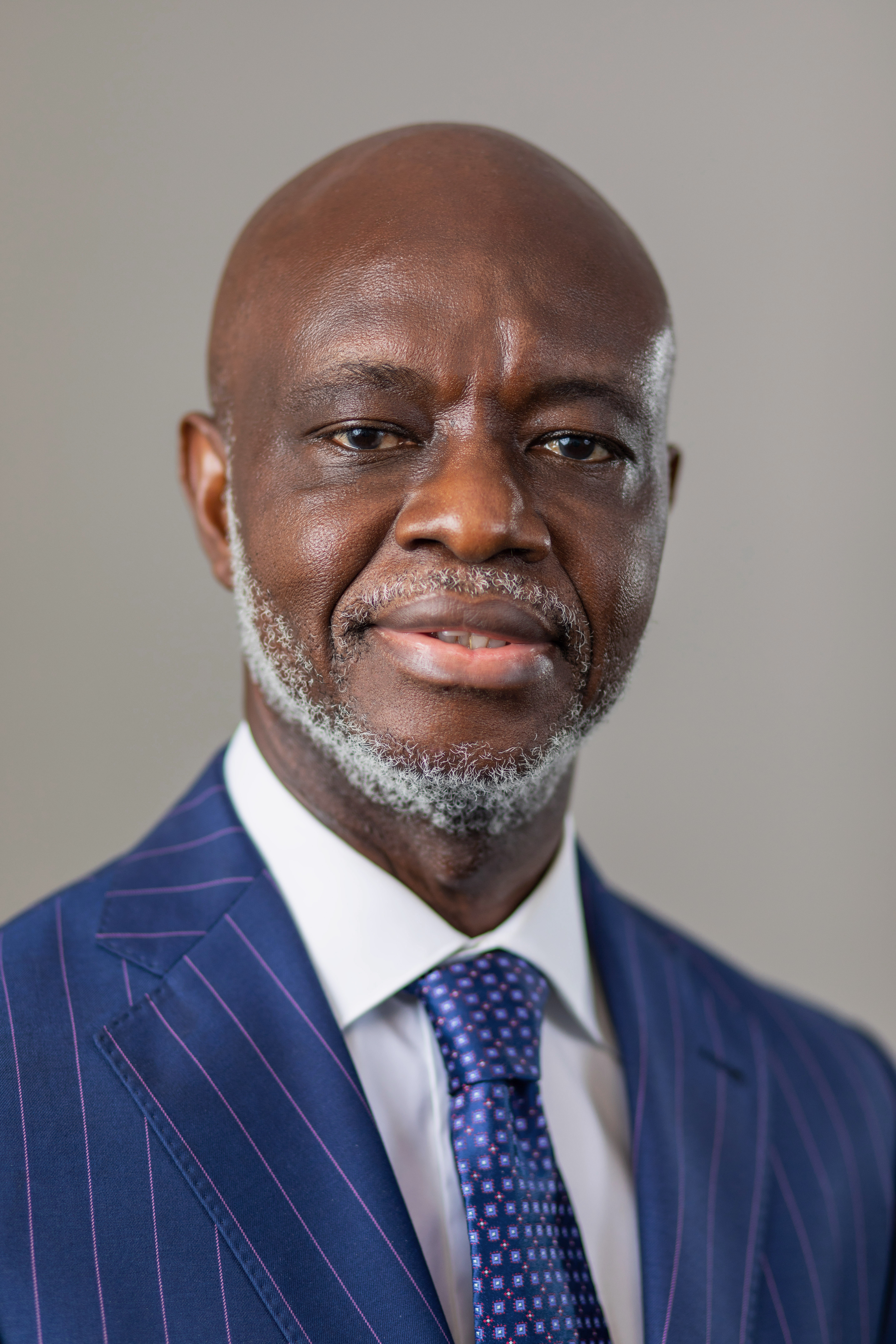
- Portrait of Joe Anokye

Director-General of the National Communications Authority
- President: Nana Akufo-Addo
- Preceded by: William Tevie
- Succeeded by: Edmund Fianko

Personal details
- Born: Ghana
- Party: New Patriotic Party
- Education: Kwame Nkrumah University of Science and Technology; University of Maryland University College
- Occupation: politician, government official

Joseph Anokye is a Ghanaian politician and former government official. A member of the New Patriotic Party, he was the Director General of the National Communications Authority from 2017 to 2025.

== Education ==
Anokye holds a Bachelor of Science in Geodetic Engineering from the Kwame Nkrumah University of Science and Technology in Kumasi and a Master of Business Administration from the University of Maryland University College, College Park, MD USA.

== Career ==
Between 1994 through 1997, Anokye worked as Senior Network Engineer at the United States Postal Service (USPS) Headquarters, Washington DC. His team of network engineers designed, installed, and maintained the USPS Wide Area Network and Local Area Network.

Beginning September 1997, when he was employed at the Goddard Space Flight Center (GFSC), through the end of NASA's Space Shuttle Program in July 2011, Anokye supported forty-nine (49) Space Shuttle Missions: from the 87th mission (STS-86) in September 1997, to the 135th mission (STS-135) which was last Space Shuttle mission in July 2011. His team, the NASA (Ground) Communications System (NASCOM) was the central nervous system that managed the terrestrial communications between ground stations, mission control centers, and other elements of spacecraft ground segments. Established in 1964, NASCOM also interfaced with the Deep Space Network (DSN), and provided worldwide, near real-time, transmission of commands, telemetry, voice, and television signals. NASCOM managed the NASA Global Mission Telecommunication Wide Area Network out of Goddard Space Flight Center in Greenbelt, Maryland.

Anokye received the employee of the year award in the year 2007 from the NASA Information Technology Services (UNITeS) contract at Marshal Space Flight Center (MSFC) in Huntsville - Alabama, for outstanding technical services to the NASA Mission Telecommunications Network. He worked at NASA GSFC until January 2016 when he returned to Ghana.

Anokye was a Cisco Technical Instructor from the year 1999 through 2016 in the Washington D.C, USA Metropolitan Area. Having attained Cisco Certified Internetwork Engineer Number 6642 (CCIE #6624) in the year 2000, he taught and mentored many Telecommunications, Network, and Systems engineers. Many of his trained network engineering professionals work with Government, Security and Civilian Agencies, State and local Governments, telecommunications companies (Cisco Systems, Juniper Networks, etc), Banks, financial institutions, regulatory and compliance and many more.

In February 2016, Anokye returned to Ghana after working with NASA for nineteen (19) years. He was appointed the Director of Technology for the New Patriotic Party (NPP) 2016 Presidential Elections Campaign. It was during this time that he developed the elections results management software that allowed for the quick and correct tallying of the Presidential and parliamentary results in the 2016 General Elections in Ghana. The systems allowed the NPP to accurately predict the outcome of the 2016 Ghanaian general elections less than eight (8) hours after polls were closed. The predictions were published days before the conclusion of the official tabulation by the Electoral Commission (EC) of Ghana but was consistent with the EC's results when it was finally released.

During the 2020 General Elections, Anokye was again appointed the Director of Technology and Digital Operations in the New Patriotic Party (NPP) Presidential and Parliamentary Campaign. As a member of the National Campaign Team, he was responsible for the day-to-day administration of the Technology unit for the 2020 campaign. He designed the infrastructure that successfully and timeously collated the presidential and parliamentary elections results of the General Elections 2020.

== Director General of NCA ==
In January 2017, the President of Ghana, Nana Akufo-Addo, appointed Anokye as Director General of the National Communications Authority to replace William Tevie, whose term as Director General had ended. His appointment was welcomed by several players in the communication sector of Ghana, including the Ghana Chamber of Telecommunications. His position as the Director General of the Authority gave him an automatic seat on the National Communications Authority Board.

As Director-General of the Authority, Anokye embarked on sanitising the Ghanaian airwaves by making sure media houses operate within the stipulated guidelines. In September 2017, the Authority sanctioned 131 media houses, threatening to close some of them due to violations. As Director General of the Authority, Anokye reports to the Minister for Communications and Digitalisation.

In November 2023, Anokye delivered three (3) lectures at the 12th R.P. Baafour Memorial Lectures at the Kwame Nkrumah University of Science and Technology, Ghana. The lecture series, established in honour of the first Vice Chancellor of KNUST, was held under the theme, "KNUST After 70: A New Age for a Renewed Focus in an Era of Disruptive Technologies".To climax the Lectures, Anokye was awarded an Honorary Doctor of Science Degree (DSc. Honoris causa) at a special congregation on 24 November 2023, in recognition of his significant contributions to Ghana's Telecommunication Industry and his presentation as the speaker of the 12th edition of the Lecture.

== See also ==
- National Communications Authority
- List of Kwame Nkrumah University of Science and Technology Alumni

Political offices
Preceded by William Tevie	Director-General of the National Communications Authority; 2017 - 2025	Succeeded by Edmund Fianko
