= National Communications Authority =

Ghananian government agency

- Type: Government institution
- Founded: Act of Parliament, Act 524 in December 1996, which has been repealed and replaced by the National Communications Authority Act, 2008 (Act 769)
- Headquarters: Airport City, Ghana
- Services: Telecommunications, broadcasting, infrastructure
- Website: www.nca.org.gh

The National Communications Authority (NCA) was established by an Act of Parliament, Act 524 in December 1996, which has been repealed and replaced by the National Communications Authority Act, 2008 (Act 769). The Authority is the statutory body mandated to license and regulate electronic communications activities and services in Ghana.

== Services ==
The authority regulates a broad range of services aimed at promoting fair competition, protecting consumer interests, and fostering innovation in the industry. The following are the key services regulated by the NCA:

- Telecommunication Services
- Broadcasting Services
- Others- Infrastructure Services

== Current leadership ==
- Ag. Director General- Rev. Ing. Edmund Yirenkyi Fianko
- Ag. Deputy Director General, Technical Operations- Mr Salifu Suleman
- Ag. Deputy Director General, Managerial Operations- Mrs. Etta Mosore

== Past Board Chairmen ==
- Hon. John Mahama 1998 – 2001
- Hon. Felix Owusu Agyapong 2001 – 2003
- Mr. Jude Arthur 2003 – 2008
- Mr. Kofi Totobi Quakyi 2009 – 2014
- Mr. Eugene Baffoe-Bonnie 2014 – 2017
- Mr. Kwaku Sakyi-Addo 2017 - 2021
- Mr. Isaac Emmil Osei - Bonsu 2021 - 2024

== Past Directors General ==
- Mr. John Kofi Gyimah 1997 – 2001
- Dr. Pasmor Kuranchie January 2001
- Major J. R. K. Tandoh (RTD) 2001 – 2007
- Mr. Bernard Forson Jnr. 2007 – 2010
- Mr. Paarock VanPercy 2010 – 2015
- Mr. William Tevie 2015 – 2017
- Mr. Joe Anokye 2017 - 2024

== See also ==
- List of telecommunications regulatory bodies
