= The Bond of 1844 =

Fante-British agreement in Ghana

The Bond of 1844 was an agreement signed between Fante kings and the British government. It was signed on 6 March 1844 in Ghana, which was then known as the Gold Coast. It specified a relationship between the British and the local kings, who were the main parties in the treaty. The British viewed the agreement as a means to administer justice and enforce their laws in the local states, while the local leaders perceived it primarily as a military and defence contract. The bond was signed at Fomena-Adansi, a significant location for both parties.

== History ==
For nearly three centuries European interests on the coast of West Africa were primarily commercial. The British, who had been on the shores of Ghana from as early as 1555, devoted their first 175 years to the building of their trade stations and trading activities, which included the trading of slaves with the locals. This resulted in the rise of two formidable indigenous states, the Fantes who were along the coast and the Asantes in the adjacent forest.

The united Fantes had control of the trade routes to the sea. Trading activities along these routes were on their terms. The Asantes secured control over the supply of gold and slaves to the coastal markets. The distribution of European imports they received in exchange was also managed by the Asantes.

As the Asante kingdom grew in wealth and influence, they sought to eliminate the middle men (the Fantes) from the supply chain. This led to a long period of conflict between the two ethnic groups.

In 1755, the Asantehene, the king of the Asantes (who was at that time Osei Bonsu) began preparing for war with the Fantes. However, he died before preparations could be completed. A twenty-year succession dispute ensued. Eventually Osei Kojo became the leader of the Asantes and carried out a series of attacks against the Fantes.

By early 1806, the main Fante army had been met and utterly subdued by the Asantes. The Asantes would then have authority over some Fante states.

A major consequence was that the Asantehene ordered Asante traders not to visit the forts in Cape Coast belonging to the British, but to deal only with the Dutch and the Danes. This made the British increasingly more concerned about Asante attacks on their coastal traders, as well as on the coastal ethnic groups.

A select committee of the British recommended that measures needed to be put in place to ensure the safety of their people, and a new governor had to be appointed by the British crown. It was also decided that a form of government over the Cape Coast forts should also be instituted. The Gold Coast settlements were soon placed under the governor of Sierra Leone, Sir Charles MacCarthy, by 1821. He arrived on the shores of Gold Coast by 1822.

MacCarthy inherited a strong likelihood of war with the Asantes, but mistook it to be a local quarrel which could have no effect on the British. He initiated policies unfavourable to the Asantes which included forcing them to release the Fantes they had hostage. Predictably the Asantes later sought revenge.

Asante armies moved south early in 1824 and, on 21 January, they met and defeated a small force under MacCarthy himself at Adamanso, in which MacCarthy was killed. After this incident, the British decided to protect their forts and traders and leave the locals to their own devices, while the Asantes continued to wage war on the Fantes.

Under Lieutenant-Colonel Purdon, the British (with the contribution of the eastern kings) won a decisive victory against the Asante at Katamanso on 7 August 1826. This battle would be named the battle of Katamanso. After this, the British tried to bring peace between the Asantes and Fantes, but the coalition of coastal chiefs were unwilling to negotiate.

The British merchants then formed an association or body to protect themselves and their interests. This led to a committee sending out Governor George Maclean in 1830. By February 15, Maclean assumed the duties of the president of the council of merchants at Cape Coast. His major task was to ensure peace between the British and the Asantes, as well the Fantes and Asantes. He was able to build a cordial relationship with both parties and ultimately succeeded in bringing peace between all parties by 1831. This led to the expansion of trade and British influence.

Peace with the Asantes also coincided with the work of missionaries, which led to the building of schools, especially along the coast. On the political front, the British government seized the opportunity to sign a political arrangement that extended British protection to the signatory confederation of the Fantes in 1844. This would be known as the Bond of 1844. Many divisions of Akyem Kotoku, the Wassaw, and the Agona had also signed the Bond by 1849. The number of states adhering to the bond in the coastal states increased in 1850.

== List of signees ==
These were the first eight Kings who signed the treaty:

1. Cudjoe Chibboe (Kwadwo Tsiboe), King of Denkyira
2. Quashie Ottoo (Kwasi Otu), King of Abrah
3. Chibboe Coomah (Tsiboe Kuma), King of Assin
4. Gebre (Gyebi), second King of Assin
5. Quashie Ankah (Kwasi Ankra), King of Donadie
6. Awoossie (Ewusi), King of Domonassie
7. Amonoo, King of Anamabo
8. Joe Aggrey, King of Cape Coast

== Impact ==
1. Protection of individuals and property.
2. It brought the Gold Coast under British colonial rule formally.
3. It stopped inhumane practices such as human sacrifice. "Panyarring" was a practice of seizing persons until repayment of debt or kidnapping of hostages of debt.
4. Introduction of judicial court system and serious crimes should be tried by British judicial officers, with the kings integrating customs of the community to general principles of British rule.
5. Furthered project of colonial domination to the detriment of the sovereignty of indigenous peoples.
