= Bernard Aidoo Forson =

Ghanaian telecommunications official

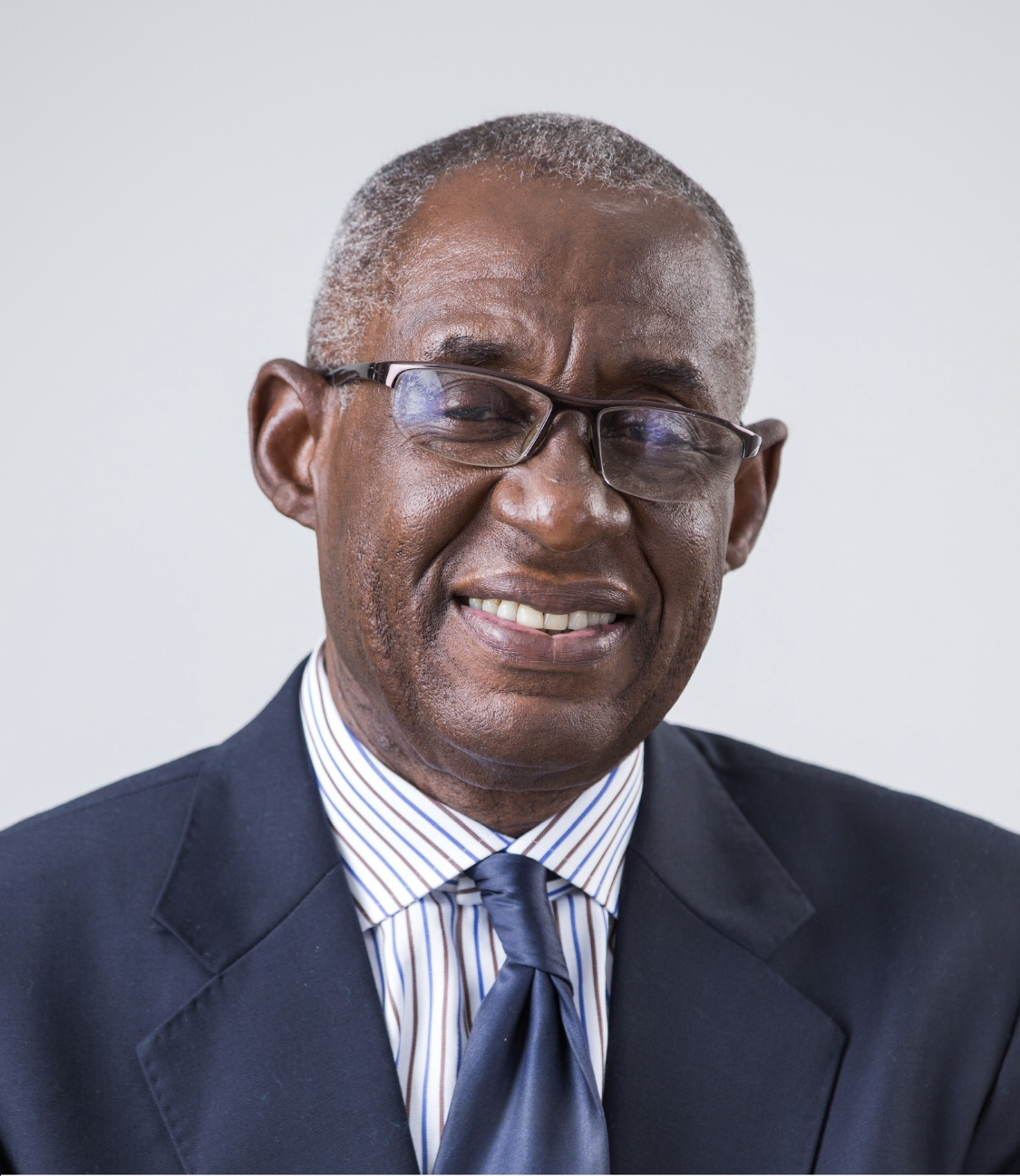

Director-General, National Communications Authority
- In office 1 August 2007 – May 2010
- President: John Kufuor; John Mahama
- Preceded by: John R. K. Tandoh
- Succeeded by: Paarock VanPercy

Deputy Director-General, National Communications Authority
- In office 1 January 2002 – 30 July 2007
- President: John Kufuor

Personal details
- Citizenship: Ghanaian
- Education: University of Ghana (BSc); Wharton School, University of Pennsylvania (MBA)
- Occupation: Telecommunications official, corporate executive

Bernard Aidoo Forson is a Ghanaian government official who served as Director-General of the National Communications Authority (NCA) from 2007 to 2010. He previously served as Deputy Director-General of the Authority from 2002 to 2007.

== Early life and education ==
Bernard Forson earned a Bachelor of Science degree in Economics from the University of Ghana in 1977 and later obtained a Master of Business Administration degree in Corporate Finance and International Business from the Wharton School of the University of Pennsylvania in 1982.

== Career ==
After his education at Wharton, Forson held various corporate positions within Fortune 500 companies in the United States. These included Southern New England Telecommunications (SNET) in New Haven, Connecticut (now part of AT&T); CellularOne in Providence, Rhode Island, a subsidiary of SNET; Pitney Bowes Inc. in Stamford, Connecticut; and Avon Products in New York.

Forson was appointed Deputy Director-General of the National Communications Authority (NCA) on 1 January 2002 and served as deputy to John Ray Tandoh's administration.

He was appointed Director-General of the NCA effective 1 August 2007, succeeding Tandoh. As Director-General, Forson oversaw the regulation of electronic communications in Ghana, including spectrum management, licensing, and compliance across the telecommunications industry. During his tenure, the Authority implemented a nationwide mobile subscriber and SIM card registration exercise aimed at improving security and regulatory oversight of the sector. The NCA also enforced quality-of-service standards, sanctioning telecommunications operators for poor network performance and requiring improvements in service delivery.

Under his leadership, the Authority adopted a cautious approach to market expansion, indicating that Ghana would not admit additional telecom operators due to spectrum constraints and the need to maintain industry stability. He was also involved in Ghana’s preparations towards digital broadcasting migration.

Forson served as Director-General until 2010, after which he was succeeded by Paarock VanPercy.

After public service, Forson served on the boards of Enterprise Group, ALFA Petrol Ghana Limited and Brassica Capital Limited. He also served as a member of the governing board of the National Communications Authority from 2017 to 2021.

== See also ==
- National Communications Authority
- Telecommunications in Ghana

Government offices
Preceded by John Ray Tandoh	Director-General of the National Communications Authority; 2007 - 2010	Succeeded by Paarock VanPercy
