= Kwasi Kwarfo Adarkwa =

Ghanaian academic

Vice Chancellor of the Kwame Nkrumah University of Science and Technology
- In office September 2006 – September 2010
- Preceded by: Kwesi Andam
- Succeeded by: William Otoo Ellis

Personal details
- Education: Mfantsipim School
- Alma mater: Kwame Nkrumah University of Science and Technology
- Profession: Academic, planner

Kwasi Kwarfo Adarkwa is a Ghanaian academic and the a past Vice Chancellor of the Kwame Nkrumah University of Science and Technology (KNUST). In 2008, he was selected by then President of Ghana, John Kufuor, for a national award in the field of academics.

== Early life and education ==
Adarkwa attended Mfantsipim School for his secondary education certificate. He then obtained his university degree from the Kwame Nkrumah University of Science and Technology. He is a fellow of the Ghana Academy of Arts and Sciences, the Ghana Institute of Planners and the Chartered Institute of Logistics and Transport.

== Career ==
=== Vice Chancellor of KNUST ===
Adarkwa served as the Pro Vice-Chancellor of KNUST, and became Vice Chancellor of KNUST from September 2006 to September 2010. He succeeded Prof. Kwesi Andam. During that time, the university was ranked among the first 100 universities of Africa. KNUST in February 2010 was ranked the 20th best university in Africa. He was succeeded by Prof William Otoo Ellis.

=== Present life ===
Adarkwa returned to the Department of Planning, KNUST to lecture at the end of his Vice-Chancellorship.

His interests in research lie in urbanisation and growth of human settlements, transportation planning and economics, and land use planning.
