= Peter Twumasi =

Ghanaian biochemist

- Born: Peter Twumasi; May 25, 1974 (age 52)
- Education: Kwame Nkrumah University of Science and Technology Wageningen University and Research
- Occupations: Biochemist, University lecturer, Sports administrator

Peter Twumasi (born May 25, 1974) is a Ghanaian biochemist, author, and professor at the Kwame Nkrumah University of Science and Technology (KNUST). He was the Director-General of the National Sports Authority of Ghana from December 2018 to February 2024. He stepped down from the position after the death of his son, Jim Ofori Twumasi, a final-year economics student at KNUST.

He was the head of the Department of Biochemistry and Biotechnology, College of Science, at KNUST from August 2017 to January 2019.

== Education ==
Peter completed his undergraduate studies at the Kwame Nkrumah University of Science and Technology (KNUST), where he obtained a Bachelor's degree in biochemistry. He obtained a master's degree and PhD at Wageningen University and Research Centre in the Netherlands.

== Career ==
In 2007, Twumasi started his career as a lecturer in the Kwame Nkrumah University of Science and Technology, where he taught biochemistry. In his years as a lecturer, he served as a senior lecturer, research fellow and visiting lecturer, and head of the Department of Biochemistry and Biotechnology at KNUST from 2017 to 2019. He was appointed Director-General of the National Sports Authority by the president of the Republic of Ghana in 2018.

Twumasi is a CV Raman Research Fellow in India. He spent three months at Amity University in Uttar Pradesh, India, as a visiting lecturer and researcher. His research on biochemistry, molecular biology, biotechnology, microbiology, health and environment, and sports has resulted in over 60 publications. He has successfully supervised hundreds of undergraduate and postgraduate (master's and PhD) theses, and some outcomes have been published in scientific journals. He has written five books and wrote several newspaper articles on science and society. His memoir, Rising from the Farmhouse, was launched in 2019 by Ghanaian vice president Dr. Mahamudu Bawumia .

In 2009, Twumasi initiated the Laboratory and Office Equipment Transfer Initiative (LOETI) Programme, which oversaw the installation of equipment such as PCR machines, DNA sequences, centrifuges, rotary shakers, UV Spectrophotometers, DNA scanners, micropipettes, laminar flowhoods and chambers worth GHS 593,544.00 for biochemistry and food science laboratories.

Twumasi is a member of the American Society for Microbiology (ASM), American Society of Plant Biologists (ASPB) and Alumni Association for Graduates and Professionals of Wageningen University and Research. He was the Kumasi Branch President for the Ghana Science Association from 2011 to 2015 during which he initiated the GSA Kumasi Branch "One-day Research Seminar and Poster Presentations". Twumasi has previously funded and chaired conference/poster sessions and press releases at local and national GSA meetings and conferences. While Director-General of the National Sports Authority, Twumasi oversaw the construction of 10 multipurpose stadiums and 65 Astroturf stadiums in Ghana.

=== Previous and current positions ===
- Chairman, Polling Agents Recruitment and Trailing Committee, NPP Ashanti Region in the 2020 Presidential and Parliamentary Elections
- Member of 2020 Ashanti Region Campaign Team
- Member of Ashanti Election Collation Team
- Member of National Research Standing Committee of the New Patriotic Party
- Member of Ashanti Regional Research Committee
- Research and Elections Officer in the Ashanti region
- Communication Officer for Oforikrom Constituency NPP
- Convener for NPP lecturers Group in the Kwame Nkrumah University of Science and Technology
- Secretary to the Nana Akufo-Addo Primaries Campaign in Ashanti Region with Hon Isaac Asiamah as Chairman
- Organizing Secretary of the KNUST NPP Branch and founding member of TESCON
