= Richard Tuyee Awuah =

Ghanaian academic and plant pathologist

Prof. Richard Tuyee Awuah FGA
- Born: Richard Tuyee Awuah; Gold Coast ( now Ghana )
- Education: Kwame Nkrumah University of Science and Technology; Cornell University
- Occupation: Academic
- Known for
- Scientific career
- Fields: Plant Pathology
- Workplaces: Kwame Nkrumah University of Science and Technology; University of Education, Winneba

Richard Tuyee Awuah is a Ghanaian academic, and Plant Pathologist. He was the dean of the faculty of Agriculture of the Kwame Nkrumah University of Science and Technology, and the principal of the University of Education's College of Agriculture.

Awuah is a Fellow of the Ghana Institute of Horticulturists, and the Ghana Academy of Arts and Sciences. He is also a member of the Ghana Science Association, the American Peanut Research and Education Society and serves as a Council Member of the African Crop Science Society.

== Education ==
Awuah had his Bachelor of Science degree in agriculture from the Kwame Nkrumah University of Science and Technology. He obtained his master's degree and doctorate degree in Plant Pathology from Cornell University.

== Career ==
Awuah began as a lecturer at the Kwame Nkrumah University of Science and Technology. At the university, he became a senior lecturer, an associate professor, and later, a professor in 2002. While working at the university, he served as head of the university's Crop Science department, and later dean of the university's faculty of Agriculture. He later joined the University of Education, Winneba, where he served as the Principal of the College of Agriculture Education. Following his statutory retirement as a staff of the University of Education, Awuah returned to the Kwame Nkrumah University of Science and Technology's College of Agriculture and Natural Resources.

Awuah has either or continues to serve on various boards and committees, some of which include; the National Best Farmer selection team of which he served as a member and later leader, the National IPM Oversight Committee, the Board of Trustees of the National Science and Technology Research Endowment Fund; the Pan African Environmental Mutagen Society; the African Crop Science Society; the University of Education (UEW) Governing Council; the Kwame Nkrumah University of Science and Technology (KNUST), and the University of Education's Academic Boards; the Executive Committees of the Kwame Nkrumah University of Science and Technology (KNUST), and the University of Education (UEW); and the Ashanti Region Table Tennis Association, of which he serves as the chairman.

== Works ==
Awuah has authored about 80 articles that have been featured in journals, conference papers, training manuals, and technical and position papers.

== Personal life ==
Awuah is a Christian and a member of the Methodist Church of Ghana. He is married to Esi Awuah and together, they have two children.
