= College of Science (KNUST) =

College in KNUST, Ghana

- Established: 1961
- Provost: Philip Antwi-Agyei
- Location: Ghana
- Campus: Urban
- Colours: Blue and White
- Website: cos.knust.edu.gh

The College of Science is one of six Colleges of the Kwame Nkrumah University of Science and Technology (KNUST). Originally established as the Faculty of Science in 1961, the College assumed its current status, following the restructuring of the University into six colleges in December 2004.

== Provost's Office ==
- Provost – Prof. Philip Antwi-Agyei
- College Registrar – Mrs. Mercy V. D. Appiah-Castel
- College Librarian – Dr. Richard Bruce Lamptey
- College Finance Officer – Dr. James Gambrah
- Assistant Registrar – Mr. Faustino Zini
- Systems Analyst – Mr. Patrice Vasco Asamoah
- College Counselor – Mr. Rabbi Darko
- College Internal Auditor – Mr. John Norago Nyerrinya
- College Exams Officer – Prof. Isaac Nkrumah
- College Accountant – Mr. Marcus H. Amosah

== Faculties and Departments ==
=== Faculty of Biosciences ===
- Biochemistry and Biotechnology
- Environmental sciences
- Food Science and Technology
- Optometry and Visual Science
- Theoretical and Applied Biology

=== Faculty of Physical And Computational Sciences ===
- Chemistry
- Computer science
- Mathematics
- Statistics and Actuarial science
- Physics
- Meteorology and Climate Science
- Information Technology
