= John Ray Tandoh =

Ghanaian telecommunications official and military officer

Major (Rtd.) John Ray Kwabena Tandoh
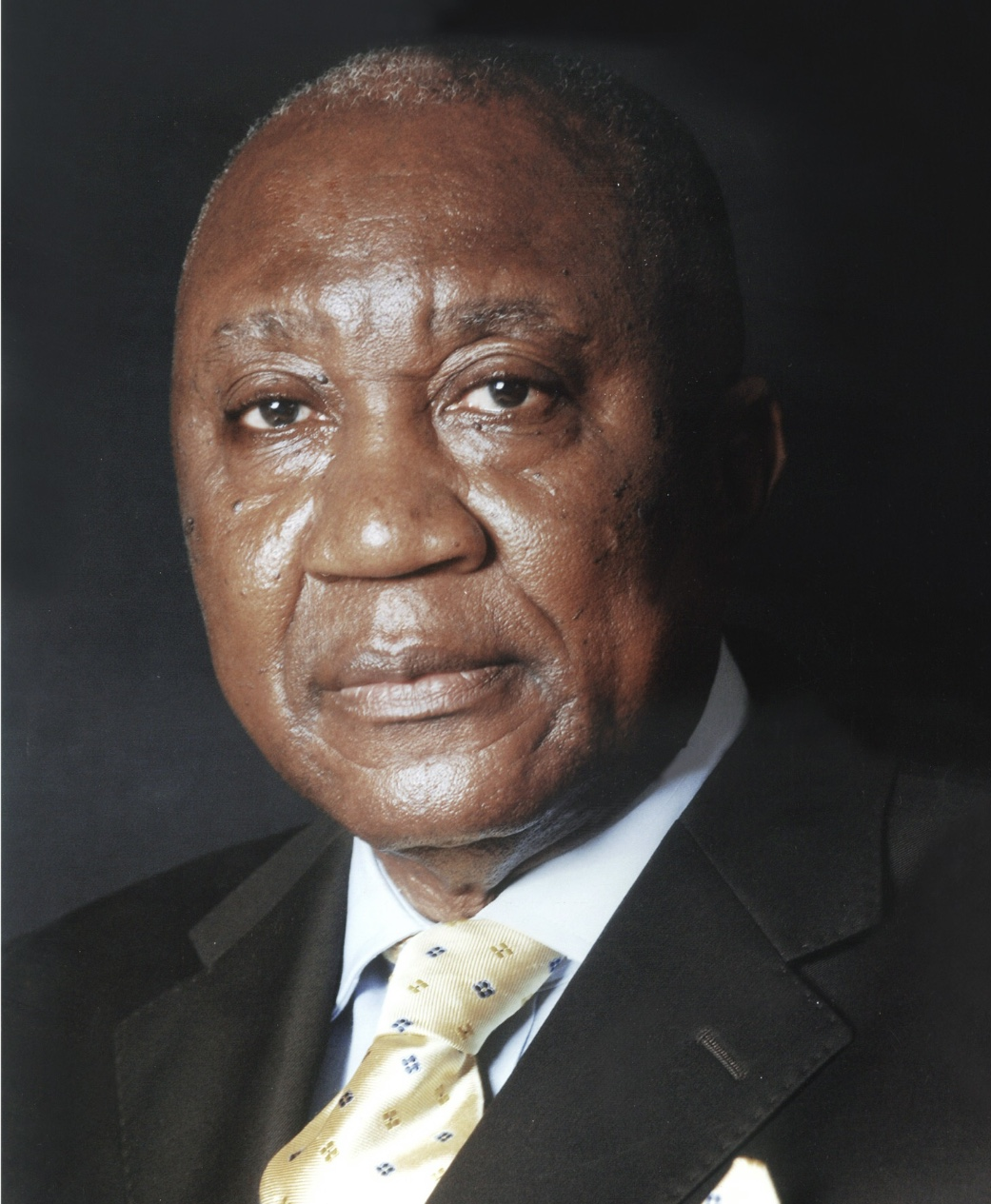

Director-General, National Communications Authority
- In office 1 July 2001 – 31 July 2007
- President: John Kufuor
- Preceded by: Pasmore Kuranchie
- Succeeded by: Bernard A. Forson, Jr.

Personal details
- Born: July 17, 1947
- Died: February 9, 2019 (aged 71)
- Citizenship: Ghanaian
- Education: Ghana Military Academy; Military College of Signals; University of Westminster
- Occupation: Telecommunications official, military officer
- Military career
- Allegiance: Ghana
- Branch: Ghana Army
- Service years: 1969–1986
- Rank: Major
- Conflicts: Lebanese civil war

John Ray Kwabena Tandoh (17 July 1947 – 9 February 2019) was a Ghanaian government official and former army officer who served as director-general of the National Communications Authority (NCA) from 2001 to 2007.

== Early life and education ==
John Ray Kwabena Tandoh was born on 17 July 1947. He received his secondary education at Tema Secondary School, where he obtained the General Certificate of Education Ordinary and Advanced Level qualifications between 1961 and 1968.

In 1969, Tandoh enlisted in the army. He trained in military communications and telecommunications engineering. He attended the Ghana Military Academy, Teshie, from 1969 to 1971, followed by studies at the School of Signals, Burma Camp, Accra, between 1972 and 1975. He later undertook advanced telecommunications engineering training at the Military College of Signals in Rawalpindi, Pakistan, from 1976 to 1977.

In 1985, Tandoh took the senior management course at the Ghana Institute of Management and Public Administration. He obtained a postgraduate certificate in Strategic Telecommunication Planning and Management at the Graduate School of Telecommunications of the University of Colorado Boulder, in the United States in 1992. He pursued a master's in Telecommunications Policy and Regulations at the University of Westminster in the United Kingdom in 2000.

== Military career ==
Tandoh was enlisted into the Ghana Armed Forces as an officer cadet in 1969. After receiving training at the Ghana Military Academy, he was promoted to second lieutenant in 1971 and commissioned into the Signal Corps of the Ghana Army.

He held several command and technical roles within the military communications system and also served with the United Nations Interim Force in Lebanon (UNIFIL) as a Signal Officer between 1980 and 1981.

Between 1982 and 1986, he was posted on secondment from the army to the civil service. During this period, he served as chief communications officer at the Central Telecommunications Laboratory and Workshop under the Office of the President at Castle Annex, Osu.

He retired from the Ghana Armed Forces on 17 July 1986 with the rank of major.

== NCA career ==
Following his military retirement, Tandoh transitioned into public telecommunications administration. From 1993 to July 2001, he was chairman and chief executive officer of the Ghana Frequency Registration and Control Board, where he oversaw national spectrum regulation and frequency management.

In August 1998, Tandoh was appointed director of Frequency Management at the National Communications Authority, a position he held until June 2001.

He was appointed director-general of the National Communications Authority on 1 July 2001 and served until his retirement on 31 July 2007. During his tenure, he led major regulatory and institutional reforms, including the acquisition of Plot No. 6, Airport City in 2001, which became the permanent headquarters of the NCA. In 2005, he supervised the remodelling of the Authority's Cantonments offices which currently houses the Electronic Communications Tribunal (established in 2008).

Tandoh played a key role in national telecommunications policy development. He led drafting efforts that culminated in the National Communications Authority Act, 1996 (Act 524), which formally established the NCA, and also headed the formulation of Ghana's National Communication and Information Policy in 1992.

== International roles ==
Tandoh represented Ghana and Africa in several high-level international telecommunications institutions. From 1999 to 2003, he served as a member of the International Telecommunication Union (ITU) Radio Regulations Board in Geneva, Switzerland, and was part of a three-member African team on the Board in 1999. He was also Ghana's councillor to the ITU from 2003 to 2007.

Tandoh served as chairman of the African Regulators Network between 2003 and 2004, and was a member of the Board of Trustees of the International Institute of Communications in London in 2000.

== Death ==
Tandoh died on 9 February 2019. His death was formally communicated by the National Communications Authority to the International Telecommunication Union in a letter dated 7 March 2019.

Government offices
Preceded by Pasmore Kuranchie	Director-General of the National Communications Authority; 2001 - 2007	Succeeded by Bernard Aidoo Forson
