= Pieter de Marees =

Dutch trader and explorer

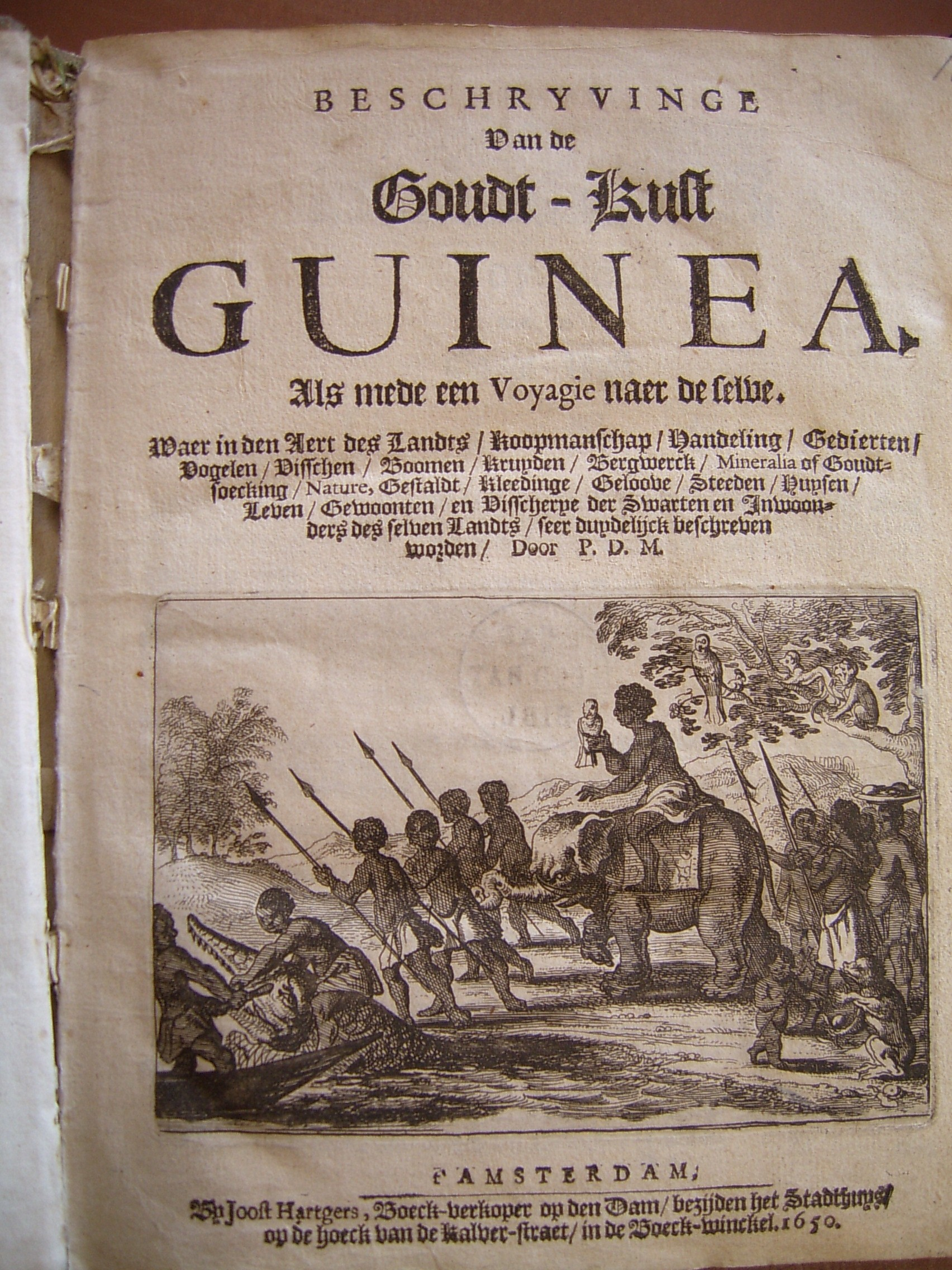
Beschryvinge van de Goudt-Kust Guinea, titlepage of 1650 edition

Pieter de Marees was a Dutch trader and explorer who is notable for writing an extensive report about his trip to the Gold Coast in 1602. This Beschrijvinghe ende historische verhael van het Gout Koninckrijck van Gunea anders de Gout-custe de Mina genaemt, liggende in het deel van Africa was the first thorough description of this part of Africa in the Dutch language, and greatly increased interest in this region in the Dutch Republic. It was translated into German, English, and Latin, and remained the most important document on the Gold Coast until it was surpassed by Willem Bosman's Nauwkeurige beschrijving van de Guinese Goud- Tand- en Slavekust (1703).
