= Esi Awuah =

Ghanaian academic

- Citizenship: Ghana
- Education: Kwame Nkrumah University of Science and Technology (BSc); College of Environmental Science and Forestry (MSc); UNESCO-IHE (PhD)
- Occupation: Academic
- Years active: 1986
- Employer: Government of Ghana
- Organization: Kwame Nkrumah University of Science and Technology
- Notable work: SWITCH EU project; African SNOWS project; CapWa; EU project; SMART sanitation project
- Title: Ambassador Prof. Mrs.
- Spouse: R. T. Awuah
- Children: 2
- Parents: Emmanuel Broni Asare; Margaret Annan
- Awards: UNESCO Mondialogo; Best research award(silver)

Esi Awuah is Ghana’s Ambassador to Switzerland, an academic and former vice chancellor of the University of Energy and Natural Resources in Sunyani, Ghana.

== Early life and education ==
Esi Awuah is the eldest child of Emmanuel Broni Asare and Margaret Annan. Her father is from Akim Oda in the Eastern Region of Ghana, and served as the Deputy Chief Conservator of Forestry in the Ashanti and Brong-Ahafo regions. Her mother, Margaret Annan, is a retired nurse's aid is from the village of Gomoa Dago in Ghana. Awuah completed her ordinary-level education at Akim Oda in 1973 and finished her advanced-level education at Aburi Girls' Secondary School in 1975. She earned a Bachelor of Science degree in Biological Sciences from Kwame Nkrumah University of Science and Technology (KNUST), her Masters in Environmental Science at SUNY ESF Syracuse in the USA and her PhD in Wastewater treatment at Wageningen University /UNESCO-IHE Delft Netherlands.

After completing her national service at the Forest Products Research Institute in Kumasi (now the Forestry Research Institute of Ghana). Awuah took a job as a research assistant at the Department of Civil Engineering. In 1981, she obtained a World Health Organization scholarship to study environmental sciences in the United States at the State University of New York College of Environmental Science and Forestry in Syracuse, New York. In 1998, she was awarded a fellowship from the Dutch government to pursue a PhD in waste-water treatment at the Institute of Infrastructural, Hydraulic, and Environmental Engineering (now UNESCO-IHE) at Delft in the Netherlands.

== Career ==
Awuah began her academic career at KNUST in 1986 at the Department of Civil Engineering. She became a senior lecturer in 1996, an associate professor in 2002, and applied for full professorship in 2008 and completing in 2014.

Awuah has taught courses at KNUST, the University of Cape Coast, and the University of Education, Winneba, for both the undergraduate and graduate levels. She has also developed curricula in several disciplines used to establish academic programs in Ghana and Liberia.

As a researcher with special interests in water supply, sanitation, waste water treatment, hygiene, and environmental risk assessment, Awuah supervised several water-quality analysis projects to raise awareness about pollution in urban streams and ground water contamination from onsite sanitation systems. Her research developments include weighting systems for impact assessment of water developments in Ghana and arsenic removal from ground water using local materials. Other focus areas include major pathogen removal mechanisms in waste stabilization ponds, the role of arsenic in Buruli ulcers as well as environmental practices and risk factors associated with the disease, risk factors associated with waste-water use in agriculture, the role of arsenic and health impacts associated with charcoal production and food vendor hygiene.

Awuah has more than 100 publications to her credit in refereed journals, conference papers, environmental reports, and book chapters. She has supervised more than 200 undergraduate students and more than 50 postgraduate students and directed several international research collaborations in water supply, environmental health, and sanitation. Notable among them are the EU-funded SWITCH project on urban water management and the CapWa project on capturing of water vapor to conserve water and energy in industries, the African SNOWS project on research capacity building for water supply, environmental health, and sanitation, and the SMART sanitation project to develop smart toilet technologies for the urban poor. These projects have generated millions of dollars for the institutions involved and established Awuah as a worldwide expert.

In addition to her 32-year teaching career, Awuah has held several leadership positions at KNUST. She was head of the Department of Environmental and Technology at its Institute of Science and Technology for Africa from 2004 to 2006, head of the Civil Engineering department from 2006 to 2008, and dean of the Faculty of Civil and Geomagnetic Engineering from 2008 to 2010. In addition, she served on the College of Engineering Appointments and Promotions Committee, the College Infrastructural Committee, and the College of Engineering Library Committee. She was also a member of the Disciplinary Committee, and as a member of the Faculty of Social Science Board, is the lecturer in charge of Environmental Quality Engineering.

She is an executive board member, representing the African region, of the Organization of Women in Science from the Developing World, and serves on several other local and international boards, including the World Water Supply and Sanitation Collaborative Council, the International Foundation for Science, SPLASH, the EU Body for Water Supply and Sanitation, Water Aid Ghana, and Zoom-lion Ghana Limited.

In the late 1980s and early 1990s, Awuah devoted attention to addressing the issue of HIV/AIDS. She also led a team of Cornell University students to organize a workshop on hygiene education in Bimbilla. The group also purchased and installed water pumps in the community.

Among her professional honors, Awuah received a UNESCO Mondialogo Award in 2007 for innovative research in engineering. She was also recognized in 2008 by the Ministry of Local Government and Rural Development in Ghana during the international year of sanitation. In 2011, she received the silver award for best research in the area of environment, water, and sanitation, during the first National Science Congress in Ghana.

== Personal life ==
Awuah attends the Mount Zion Methodist Church in Kotei, Kumasi, where she is an organist and choir member. She is married to R. T. Awuah, a plant pathologist and former principal of the College of Agriculture at the University of Education, Winneba (Ashanti Mampong Campus), and former dean of the Faculty of Agriculture at KNUST. The couple have two sons, Ato and Kobbina.

== External sources ==
- Esi Awuah
