= Aba Andam =

Ghanaian physicist

Professor Aba A. Bentil Andam PhD, CPhys, FInstP, FGA
- Born: Elizabeth Aba Bentil Andam; 1948 (age 77–78); Ajumako Kokoben, Ghana
- Education: University of Cape Coast; University of Birmingham; Durham University
- Scientific career
- Fields: Particle physics, Nuclear Physics
- Workplaces: Kwame Nkrumah University of Science and Technology; Ghana Academy of Arts and Sciences; University of Cape Coast; UNESCO

Aba A. Bentil Andam (born 1948) is a Ghanaian particle physicist who was President of the Ghana Academy of Arts and Sciences from 2017 to 2019. She is the first Ghanaian female physicist.

== Early life and education ==
Aba A. Bentil Andam was born in Ghana in 1948 in Ajumako Kokoben. She had her secondary education at Mfantsiman Senior High School. She completed her undergraduate degree at the University of Cape Coast in Ghana (1969–1973),⁣ where she majored in physics and minored in mathematics. She sought further education in Britain where she earned a master's degree from the University of Birmingham (1976–1977) and a Ph.D. in Cosmic Radiation Physics from Durham University in the UK (1978–1981). she was the only woman physicist in the department during her time there.

== Career ==
In 1986, she became a chartered physicist and full member of the Institute of Physics. In addition to her scientific degrees, she is fluent in French, and has a number of different French language qualifications, including the Diplome de Langue d'Alliance Francaise de Paris; the French Proficiency Certificate of Ghana Institute of Languages; and the Certificate of Translation, Alliance Francaise de Paris.

In 1986 and 1987 she studied charmed mesons at the German research station DESY (Deutsches Elektronen-Synchrotron). Later, her research focused on radon and surveyed human exposure levels of the radioactive gas in Ghana. Andam was interested in determining how much radiation from radon Ghanaians were exposed to, and how she can reduce radon radiation exposure. She is also interested in radiation-based safety measures, such as working out a safety standard for X-ray scans.

Beginning in 1987, she participated in the Ghana Science Clinics for Girls, a program set up to encourage more girls to study science and mathematics. The scientists then acted as role models to the students. These clinics led to increased performance in the students who took part, and the retention rates from primary to university considerably increased. Andam is passionate about sharing her love of science with young women and encouraging them to take up science.

Andam has been a professor at the Kwame Nkrumah University of Science and Technology since 1981. She has headed the physics department since the mid 2000s, and from 2005 has been the WILKADO Chair of Science and Technology. She conducts research in applied nuclear physics at Kumasi's Nuclear Research Laboratory. She also was a part-time lecturer at the University of Cape Coast. She has served as the UNESCO chair of the Women in Science and Technology in Africa's West African region between 1996 and 2002.

Andam has been a member of the National Council for Tertiary Education and has been honored with awards from various entities including Obaa Mbo, a television program, as well as The Women of Excellence Award from the Ministry of Gender. Additionally, recognition has been bestowed upon her by the Council for Scientific and Industrial Research (CSIR) and the Chartered Institute of Supply Chain Management of Ghana.

Since September 2019, she has held the position of President at the Ghana Institute of Physics. She has also served as a member of the Commission on Physics and Development (C13) of the International Union of Pure and Applied Physics (IUPAP) since 2018. Additionally, she has been a member of the Committee on the proposed African Light Source since 2020. In her extensive career, she has held key roles such as Foundation Chairman for the Council of the University of Energy and Natural Resources, Ghana (2012–2015), and Foundation Chairman for the Council of Koforidua Polytechnic, Ghana (1997–2002). Furthermore, she has contributed significantly as a member of the Governing Board of the Ghana Atomic Energy Commission (1997-2001, then 2002–2008). She is also recognized as a Foundation Member of the First IUPAP Working Group on Women in Physics and has led the Ghana Team of the IUPAP Conferences on Women in Physics to date.

== Honours and recognition ==
She is a fellow of various different scientific organizations namely; The World Innovation Foundation (from 2002), Ghana Academy of Arts and Sciences (from 2003), and the Institute of Physics (from 2004). She was the President of the Ghana Academy of Arts and Sciences (2017–2019), the second woman to hold this position.

== Personal life ==
She was married to Professor Kwesi Akwansah Andam who was a civil engineer, an academician and a former Vice Chancellor. They had four children.
