= William Tevie =

Ghanaian computer scientist

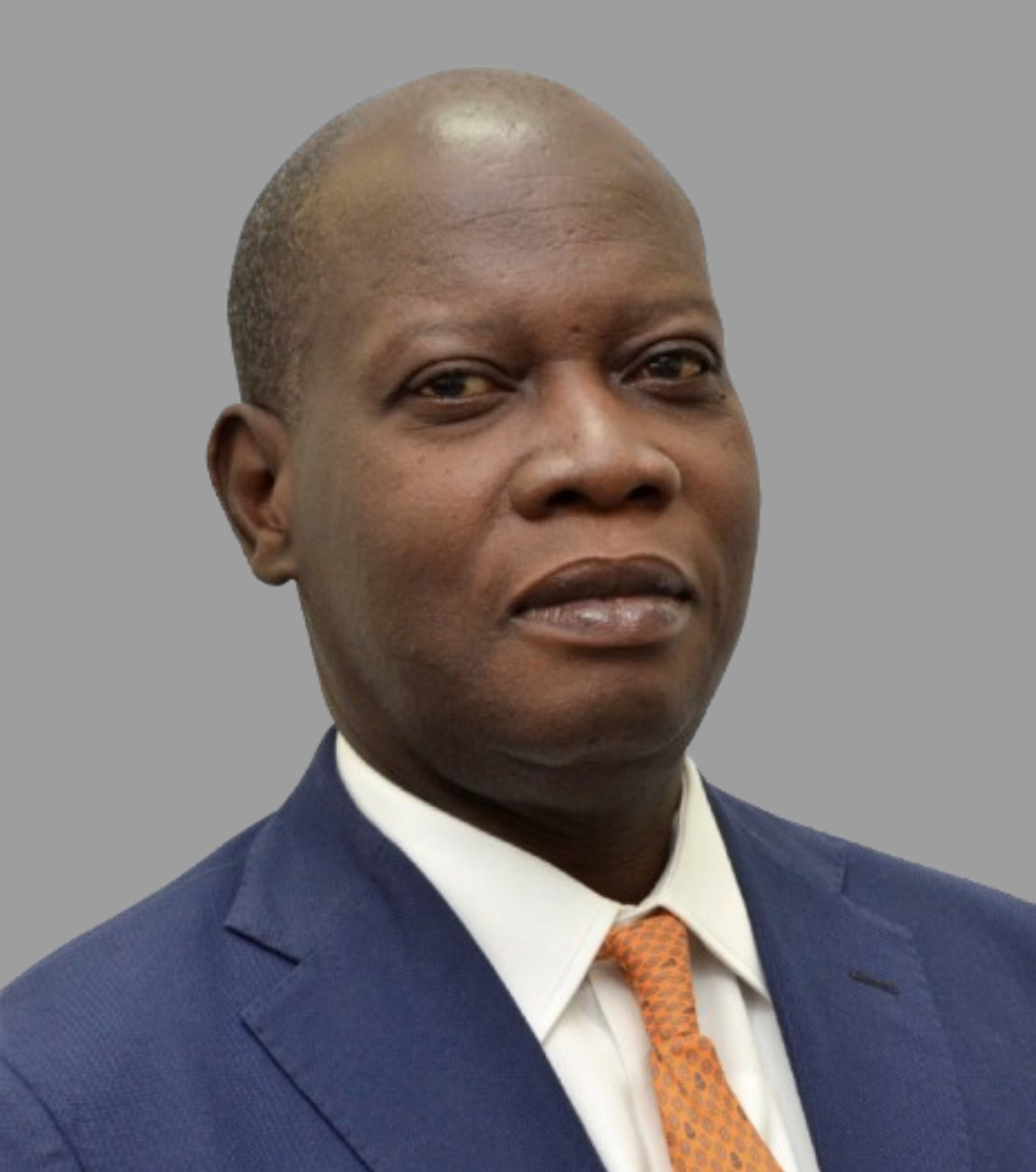
- Born: William Tevie
- Known for: Former Director General of National Communications Authority, Former National Information Technology Agency, Network Computer Systems, Internet Pioneering in Ghana
- Children: 4

Mr. William Tevie is a Ghanaian Computer Scientist formerly known as the Director General for the National Communications Authority and member of the Internet Society of Ghana Chapter.

== About ==
Mr. William Tevie was the Director General for the National Communications Authority and was appointed by the President in July 2015. He has been involved in the IT industry for over 26 years, in areas including software development, IT, Telecoms, management consultancy, Network Routing and leadership training. He was one of the first engineers working in the commercial Internet in Ghana and played a key role in building the modern Internet in Ghana and West Africa. He is the Tech point of contact for the. GH top-level domain. He is amongst the first African instructors at Internet Society's INET workshops in Canada, Malaysia and in other countries for developing countries to train engineers from the developing world on networks build-out in the early 1990s This program later translated to the Africa Network Operators Group (AfNOG) workshop of which he was an instructor in the maiden edition in Cape Town, South Africa. Over his 26-year involvement in IT, he has worked with Internet Society, AFNOG, AFRINIC (the Africa Regional IP Organization) and other international organizations in the networking space. He is a board member of data protection council and Former chairman of Research Subcommittee of NCA.] [https://www.itu.int/en/ITU-T/Workshops-and-Seminars/standardization/201603/Pages/TEVIE-William-NCA-Ghana.aspx He was the Director General for the National Information Technology Agency.

== Professional Affiliation ==
1. Association for Computing Machinery
2. Internet Engineering Task Force
3. Member - Internet Society (International)
4. Program Director - Internet Society, Ghana Chapter
5. Board Member 'hana Network Information Centre
6. Technical Point of Contact (.GH)
7. Country Code Top Level Domain Member AFNOG
8. AFRINIC founding member
9. Member – Ghana Institute of Information Technology Member
10. Ghana ISP Association Member
11. IT Association of Ghana

== Publications ==
• The development of the Internet in Ghana - 1996

• The expansion of the Internet in Ghana - 1998

== Education ==
1. Sept. 1986 - July 1988 BSc- Computer Science, University of Science and Technology, Kumasi Ghana.
2. Sept. 1981 - June 1984 Dip Data Processing, University of Science, and Technology Kumasi, Ghana.

He was the Director General for the National Information Technology Agency.

== Corruption allegations ==
On 22 December 2017 Amankwah was arraigned before court following a committee set up by the Chief Justice, Justice Sophia Akuffo to investigate complaints and corruption allegations levelled against him and four others. The committee was set up based on the provision stipulated under section 23(1) and section 179(3)(a) of the Criminal Offences Act 1960, Act 29 of the Ghanaian constitution. It was alleged that Mr. William Tevie and four others caused financial loss to the state due to a contract entered between the National Communications Authority and Infraloks Development Limited (IDL), contrary to section 23(1) and section 179(3)(a) of the Criminal Offences Act 1960, Act 29.
