= Eric Aboagye =

Ghanaian professor

- Born: Ghana
- Education: Kwame Nkrumah University of Science and Technology (BSc); University of Strathclyde (MSc); University of Glasgow (PhD)
- Scientific career
- Institutions: Johns Hopkins University; Imperial College London
- Thesis: Fluorinated 2-Nitroimidazoles: Non-Invasive Probes for Detecting Therapeutically Relevant Tumour Hypoxia by Magnetic Resonance Spectroscopy (1995)

Eric Ofori Aboagye is a professor of cancer pharmacology and molecular imaging at Imperial College London. He is a Fellow of the Academy of Medical Sciences and was awarded the British Institute of Radiology Sir Mackenzie Davidson Medal in 2009. He is co-director of the Imperial College London Experimental Cancer Medicine's Centre.

== Early life and education ==
Aboagye was born in Ghana. He studied pharmacy at the Kwame Nkrumah University of Science and Technology in 1989. He moved to the United Kingdom shortly after, and completed a master's degree in pharmaceutical analysis at the University of Strathclyde. He earned his doctoral degree at the Cancer Research UK Beatson Laboratories in Glasgow. He was a postdoctoral researcher at Johns Hopkins University.

== Research and career ==
Aboagye joined Imperial College London as a research associate in 1998. He was promoted to Professor in 2006. He is interested in molecular imaging and the development of novel imaging for cancer diagnosis. He is Director of the Comprehensive Cancer Imaging Centre, which combines synthetic chemistry, software development and biomedical science in an effort to diagnose and treat cancer patients.

He has demonstrated that artificial intelligence is significantly more accurate than blood tests in predicting the survival rates of ovarian cancer. For the study, Aboagye used TexLab to analyse CT scans and establish the health risks associated with different tumours. The software was trained to analyse the shape, size, genetic composition and structure of tumours. Aboagye have developed imaging tools capable of characterising choline, glycogen and fatty acid metabolism.

=== Awards and honours ===
His awards and honours include:

- 2009 British Institute of Radiology Sir Mackenzie Davidson Medal
- 2010 Elected Fellow of the Academy of Medical Sciences

=== Selected publications ===
His publications include:

- Aboagye, Eric O. (1999). "Malignant transformation alters membrane choline phospholipid metabolism of human mammary epithelial cells". Cancer Research. 59 (1): 80–4. PMID 9892190.
- Aboagye, Eric O. (2013). "Magnetic nanoparticles as contrast agents in the diagnosis and treatment of cancer". Chemical Society Reviews. 42 (19): 7816–33. doi:10.1039/C3CS60149H. PMID 23788179.
- Aboagye, Eric O. (2003). "3′-Deoxy-3′-[^{18}F]Fluorothymidine as a New Marker for Monitoring Tumor Response to Antiproliferative Therapy in Vivo with Positron Emission Tomography". Cancer Research. 63.
