= Kwesi Akwansah Andam =

Ghanaian academic

Vice Chancellor of the Kwame Nkrumah University of Science and Technology
- In office September 2006 – September 2002
- Preceded by: John Sefa Ayim
- Succeeded by: Kwasi Kwarfo Adarkwa

Personal details
- Born: 15 December 1946
- Died: 14 December 2007 (aged 60) Accra, Ghana
- Spouse: Aba Andam
- Children: 4

Kwesi Akwansah Andam (15 December 1946 – 14 December 2007) was a Ghanaian academic and former Vice Chancellor of the Kwame Nkrumah University of Science and Technology. He was a professor of engineering. He died on 14 December 2007 at the 37 Military Hospital.

== Early life and education ==
Prof. Andam was born at Ekumfi Atakwaa in the Central Region of Ghana 15 December 1946. He obtained his secondary school certificate from Ghana Secondary Technical School at Takoradi in the Western Region of Ghana. He obtained a Bachelor of Science degree in Civil Engineering from the Kwame Nkrumah University of Science and Technology. Prof. Andam obtained his PhD in Structural Engineering Computer Aided Design (CAD) Division at Newcastle University, Newcastle upon Tyne in the United Kingdom.

== Career ==
In 1980, he was appointed a lecturer at the Civil Engineering Department of KNUST. He became a senior lecturer in 1985. He became an associate professor in 1992 and a full professor in 1997.

=== Vice Chancellor of KNUST ===
Andam was appointed as the Vice Chancellor of KNUST by the governing board of the university. His four-year term started in September 2002 and ended in September 2006.

== Personal life ==
He was married to Professor Aba Andam who is a physicist and an academic. They had four children. He died on 14 December 2007 at the 37 Military Hospital after a short illness.

== Publications ==
Andam authored over 100 science books and papers.
