= Vida Akoto-Bamfo =

Ghanaian judge

Justice of the Supreme Court of Ghana
- In office 31 October 2009 – 14 February 2019
- Appointed by: John Atta Mills

Justice of the Appeal Court of Ghana
- In office 1999–2009
- Nominated by: Jerry Rawlings

Justice of the High Court of Ghana
- In office 1991–1999
- Nominated by: Jerry Rawlings

Personal details
- Born: 7 February 1949 (age 77)
- Education: Mfantsiman Girls' Senior High School; Aburi Girls' Senior High School; University of Ghana; Ghana School of Law
- Occupation: Judge

Vida Akoto-Bamfo (born 7 February 1949) is a retired Ghanaian Supreme Court Judge. She served on the Supreme Court bench from 2009 to 2019.

== Early life and education ==
Akoto-Bamfo was born on 7 February 1949 to Alfred Kingsley Bannerman-Williams and Grace Darkua Dodoo at Pokuase, in the Greater Accra Region of Ghana. She had her early education at Accra Royal School in James Town (British Accra). In 1963, she gained admission to Mfantsiman Girls' Secondary School where she obtained her 'O' Level certificate. She later continued at Aburi Girls' Senior High School from 1967 to 1969. She studied law at the University of Ghana Law School between 1972 and 1975. She then proceeded to the Ghana School of Law in Accra.

== Career ==
Prior to joining the bench in 1981, Akoto-Bamfo worked at the Attorney-General's Office as a National Service personnel. She later joined British Indian Insurance Company in Accra, and the now defunct Zenith Assurance as Manager in charge of claims from 1976 to 1981. There, she was responsible for settling insurance claims. She became a District Magistrate in 1981. As a magistrate, she was first stationed at the New Town Magistrate Court for her first two years. She was later transferred to Cocoa Affairs where she worked as one of the first Magistrates there. She was later appointed a Circuit Court judge at Tema for a brief while before returning to Cocoa Affairs in 1986. She remained at Cocoa Affairs from then until 1991 when she was promoted to the High Court bench. After serving as a justice of the High Court for three years, she was transferred to the Gambia on secondment for two years as Chairperson of the Assets Commission. She was appointed an Appeal Court Judge in 1999 and continued in this position until her nomination and appointment to the Supreme Court of Ghana by John Evans Atta Mills, President of Ghana in 2009. She retired in February 2019. She was appointed together with Nasiru Sulemana Gbadegbe and Benjamin Teiko Aryeetey (now retired). She joined Justices Stephen Alan Brobbey, Georgina Theodora Wood (then Chief Justice) and Samuel K. Date-Bah, who are all retired.

== Personal life ==
Vida Akoto-Bamfo was married to the late Eugene Akoto-Bamfo Snr., a Legal Officer. She identified as a Methodist but fellowships at the Police Church.

== See also ==
- List of judges of the Supreme Court of Ghana
- Judiciary of Ghana
