= V. C. R. A. C. Crabbe =

Ghanaian jurist and public servant (1923–2018)

His Lordship V. C. R. A. C. Crabbe JSC, FGA

Justice of the Supreme Court of Ghana
- In office 24 October 1980 – 1981
- Nominated by: Hilla Limann
- In office 1970–1972
- Nominated by: Edward Akufo-Addo

Justice of the Court of Appeal
- In office 1977–1979
- Nominated by: Ignatius Kutu Acheampong

Interim Electoral Commissioner
- In office 3 April 1968 – 23 December 1970
- Appointed by: Constituent Assembly

Justice of the High Court
- In office 1966–1969
- Nominated by: Joseph Arthur Ankrah
- In office 1972–1976
- Nominated by: Ignatius Kutu Acheampong

Personal details
- Born: Vincent Cyril Richard Arthur Charles Crabbe; 29 October 1923 Accra, Gold Coast
- Died: 7 September 2018 (aged 94) Accra, Ghana
- Education: Accra Academy
- Alma mater: Inner Temple
- Profession: Judge; Law professor

Vincent Cyril Richard Arthur Charles (V. C. R. A. C.) Crabbe JSC, FGA (29 October 1923 – 7 September 2018) was a Ghanaian jurist and public servant. He was a judge of the Supreme Court of Ghana from 1970 to 1972 and from 1980 to 1981.

Before becoming a judge, Crabbe worked with the Office of the Attorney-General in a legislative drafting role. At the advent of the Second Republic, he was appointed interim electoral commissioner. Crabbe formed and presided over a permanent electoral commission to conduct the 1969 Ghanaian Election. Crabbe chaired the Constituent Assembly of 1979 that produced a constitution for Ghana's Third Republic. He was the Statute Law Revision Commissioner under the Fourth Republic. At the time of his death, he was a Professor of Law at Mountcrest University College.

== Early life ==
V. C. R. A. C. Crabbe was born on 29 October 1923 at Ussher town in Accra, Gold Coast to Richard Arthur Crabbe, the Chief Registrar of the Courts (the most senior staff of the Judicial Service of the Gold Coast), and his wife Stella Akoley Lartey. Charles's father died eleven months after he was born.

Crabbe attended the Government Junior Boys' School and the Government Senior Boys' Schools, Kinbu, from 1928 to 1938. In 1939, he entered Accra Academy at a time when a family relation, Samuel Azu Crabbe, was the school's headboy. There, he completed his secondary education in 1943.

Crabbe went to work as a Second Division Clerk at the Gold Coast Police Force Headquarters. During the February 1948 riots, Crabbe was assigned in the crowd to gather intelligence for the Police Service. While working with the police, he studied for an intermediate Bachelor of Arts degree through correspondence with Wolsey Hall, Oxford.

In November 1949, he quit his work and left the Gold Coast for England. From 1950 to 1952, Crabbe studied Economics at the City of London College. E. A. N. Ffoulkes Crabbe, an elder brother, who was Clerk of the Gold Coast Legislative Assembly, as part of government delegation visited London and encouraged him to switch his studies to law. In August 1952, Crabbe was admitted to Inner Temple for training as a lawyer. He completed the three-year course in two years and was called to the Bar in England on 8 February 1955, having been granted a dispensation. The same year he was enrolled as a member of the Gold Coast Bar.

== Constitutional and electoral work ==
In 1955 Crabbe joined the Attorney-General's Department of Ghana as an Assistant Crown Counsel. Together with the New Zealand lawyer Fred Boyce, he drafted the legislations, Ordinances and Acts of Parliament which were passed by the National Assembly on the eve of 6 March 1957 for Ghana's Independence.

On 1 June 1958, he was promoted as a first parliamentary counsel, becoming the first African to achieve the rank of a parliamentary counsel (state attorney). He was appointed Head of Drafting at Ghana's Ministry of Justice and was responsible for producing the legislations to be passed by Ghana's early National Assembly. In 1963, president Nkrumah sent him on a mission to Uganda where he was made a first parliamentary counsel and constitutional advisor to the Uganda government and drafted the 1966 Ugandan constitution.

In August 1968, he was appointed interim electoral commissioner of Ghana to conduct the 1969 elections on his return from Uganda. Crabbe set up Ghana's first-ever electoral commission. In addition, he served as special commissioner to the 1969 Constitutional Commission and a legislative draftsman to the 1969 Constituent Assembly which drafted the 1969 Constitution of Ghana.

Crabbe was chairman of the 1979 Constituent Assembly of Ghana, which drafted the 1979 Constitution of Ghana.

Crabbe was co-chair of the Coalition of Democratic Election Observers Ghana (CODEO), an agency under the Ghana Centre for Democratic Development (CDD-Ghana), which independently monitors electoral processes.

In 2002, Crabbe worked with the Constitutional Review Commission of Kenya and was leader of the group of draftspersons who drafted the Kenya Constitution. In the same year, he did work the Zambian Constitutional Commission for the drafting of the Zambian Constitution. Crabbe worked with the Fiajoe Review Commission for the review of the 1992 Constitution of Ghana and also worked with Justice P. N. Bhagwati, former Chief Justice of India and Justice Kayode Eso of the Supreme Court of Nigeria to advise on the setting up of the Constitutional Court in South Africa.

In January 1999, Crabbe was appointed by the Ghanaian government as Commissioner of Statute Law Revision. He held office until 2014 at the Ghanaian Ministry of Justice and in this office revised the Laws of Ghana from 1852 to 2004 in seven volumes before retiring from public office.

== Work as a Judge ==
Crabbe was appointed a high court judge on 16 December 1966, soon after his return from Uganda. In 1968, when he was appointed as Interim Electoral Commissioner of Ghana, it was with the status of a Justice of the Court Appeal.

In 1970, he was nominated as a judge of the Supreme Court of Ghana by prime minister Kofi Abrefa Busia as one of the first four nominated judges of the court in the Second Republic. He was nominated alongside Edmund Bannerman, Koi Larbi and Johnson Siriboe. Following the military coup that toppled the Busia government in 1972, the supreme court was suspended. When the judicial system was restored, Crabbe was not sent to the appeal court, which became the highest court, but returned to the high court. He served as a high court judge from 1972 to 1975. In 1976, he was sent to the court of appeal as a judge.

In June 1980, he was nominated as a supreme court judge on the reconstitution of the court under the constitution of the third republic. He was one of the first four judges to be nominated to the court under the Third Republic. The three others were Ernest Sowah, Patrick Anin and Philip Archer.

== Teaching roles ==
From 1958 to 1963, Crabbe was a tutor and lecturer during the foundation years of the Ghana School of Law until he left for Uganda. He also worked as a Senior Instructor at the International Law Development Centre in Rome, Italy.

From 1974 to 1998, he was Director of the Commonwealth Secretariat Scheme for Legislative draftsmen for the West African Region, Southern Africa Region and the Caribbean Region. In 1986, he was sent by the scheme to be a professor of legislative drafting at the Cave Hill Campus, Barbados of the University of West Indies.

Crabbe was a professor of law at Mountcrest University College in Accra until his death on 7 September 2018.

== Personal life ==
Crabbe had six children. He was also a Freemason, belonging to the District Grand Lodge of Ghana under the United Grand Lodge of England.

== Honours ==
Though gazetted as a recipient of the national honour of Companion of the Order of Volta in 1979, Crabbe was never invited for the investiture. He was honoured as an honorary fellow of the Nigerian Institute of Advanced Legal Studies. In 2006, the chiefs and people of Ngleshie Alata, Jamestown awarded him a Certificate of Honour. In November 2013, he received an honorary doctorate from the Kwame Nkrumah University of Science and Technology, after he had assisted the institution to establish its Faculty of Law. On 31 January 2015, at the Metropolitan Ball in Accra, he received a Certificate of Honour from the chief executive officer of the Accra Metropolitan Assembly. On 15 March 2017, he delivered an inaugural lecture on the theme "The Philosophy of Man" after he was elected a Fellow of the Ghana Academy of Arts and Sciences.

== Death ==
He died at the age of 94 on 7 September 2018 in Accra, Ghana. A state funeral, attended by several dignitaries and members of the legal fraternity, was held for him on Thursday 4 October 2018 at the Accra International Conference Centre.

== Literature ==
- Amoak, Kwesi (2016), Unfinished journey: the life and times of V.C.R.A.C. Crabbe : a legal luminary Sakumo, Ghana: Smartline Limited

== See also ==
- Electoral Commission of Ghana
- List of judges of the Supreme Court of Ghana
- Supreme Court of Ghana
