= Anthony Benin =

Ghanaian judge (born 1950)

Justice of the Supreme Court of Ghana
- In office 11 November 2012 – January 2020
- Appointed by: John Dramani Mahama

Appeal Court Judge
- In office 1994 – 11 November 2012
- Nominated by: Jerry John Rawling

Personal details
- Born: 4 January 1950 (age 76)
- Education: Sekondi College; University of Ghana; Ghana School of Law
- Profession: Judge

Anthony Benin (born 4 January 1950) is a Ghanaian judge and a former justice of the Supreme Court of Ghana. He was one of two judges sworn into office by the President of Ghana, John Dramani Mahama, in the presence of the Chief Justice of Ghana, Georgina Theodora Wood, in November 2012.

He has also presided over cases at the ECOWAS court.

== Early life and education ==
Benin was born on 4 January 1950 in Kumasi. He had his secondary education at Sekondi College, completing his studies in 1970. He continued at the University of Ghana, graduating with a bachelor's degree in 1973. He then proceeded to the Ghana School of Law where he completed his studies in 1975. He was called to the bar that same year.

== Career ==
In 1976, Benin was appointed Assistant State Attorney. Three years later, he joined the bench as a Grade two District Magistrate. He became an Appeal Court Judge in 1994 and 2012, he was appointed justice of the Supreme Court of Ghana. While serving on the Appeal Court bench, he was appointed to the West African Regional Court as a pioneer judge in 2001. He served as Vice President of the Court from 2007 to 2009. He remained on the ECOWAS Community Court until 2011. Benin retired from the Supreme Court of Ghana in January 2020.

== See also ==
- List of judges of the Supreme Court of Ghana
- Supreme Court of Ghana
- Judiciary of Ghana
