= Francis Kpegah =

Ghanaian Supreme Court Judge

Justice Francis Yaonasu Kpegah

Supreme Court Judge
- In office 6 January 1993 – 2008
- Appointed by: Jerry Rawlings

Francis Yaonasu Kpegah is a retired Ghanaian judge who was on the Supreme Court of Ghana between 1993 and 2008. He was appointed to the Supreme Court on 6 January 1993. He acted as the Chief Justice of Ghana following the death of George Kingsley Acquah on 25 March 2007 until the appointment of Georgina Theodora Wood on 15 June 2007 as the new Chief Justice.

In 2013, he caused a lot of excitement in Ghana when he sued Nana Akufo-Addo, the presidential candidate of the New Patriotic Party (NPP) for impersonation. His suit sought the High Court to declare that Nana Akufo-Addo was never called to the Ghana Bar and that his private law firm was thus also illegal. This upset many in the NPP including the former President John Kufuor. He was also subjected to various attacks through the media to which he responded that he would like Nana Akufo-Addo to go through the court process in answering back.

== See also ==
- List of judges of the Supreme Court of Ghana
- Supreme Court of Ghana
