= Joseph Bawa Akamba =

Ghanaian judge

Justice of the Supreme Court of Ghana
- In office 11 November 2012 – 2016
- Appointed by: John Dramani Mahama

Justice of the Appeal Court of Ghana
- In office 2001–2012
- Appointed by: John Agyekum Kufuor

Justice of the Appeal Court of the Gambia
- In office 1999–2001
- Appointed by: Yahya Jammeh

Justice of the High Court
- In office 1989–1994
- Appointed by: Jerry John Rawlings

Personal details
- Born: June 6, 1946 (age 80)
- Education: Ghana Senior High School (Tamale); Tamale Senior High School; University of Ghana; Ghana School of Law
- Profession: Judge

Joseph Bawa Akamba is a Ghanaian judge, who served as a justice of the Supreme Court of Ghana from 2012 to 2016. He was sworn into office by the President of Ghana, John Dramani Mahama in the presence of the Chief Justice of Ghana, Georgina Theodora Wood in November 2012. He retired from the Supreme Court in 2016. He had served a total of about 40 years in the Ghanaian Judicial Service. In 1994, he also served as Director of Public Prosecutions in The Gambia.

Akamba held various positions throughout his judicial career, some of which include; serving as the Chairman of the Committee of Inquiry into the Tamale Riots in 1993, Chairing the Committee of Inquiry into affairs of the Ghana School of Law in 2006, and also serving as the President of the Association of Magistrates and Judges of Ghana in 2007.

== Early life and education ==
Akamba was born in Kumasi on 6 June 1946. He had his secondary education at Ghana Senior High School, Tamale (then Ghana College) where he obtained his 'O' Level Certificate in 1965 and Tamale Senior High School (then Government Secondary School) where he obtained his 'A' Level Certificate. He proceeded to the University of Ghana to pursue a Bachelor of laws degree (LLB), graduating in 1972. He entered the Ghana School of Law after his undergraduate studies and obtained his Barrister-at-law certificate (BL) in 1974. He also holds a certificate in Advanced Leadership from the Haggai Institute of Advanced Leadership which he received on 13 May 1999.

== Career ==
Akamba taught at Tamale Business School from 1965 to 1969. He also worked as an Assistant State Attorney at the Attorney-General's Office prior to joining the Judiciary as a District Magistrate. He served as a District Magistrate from 1977 until 1984 when he was promoted to Circuit Court judge. In 1989, he was elevated to the High Court bench and remained in this position until 1994 when he gained an appointment at the Gambia to work as a Director of Public Prosecutions from 1994 to 1999. Later in 1999, he was appointed Justice of The Gambia Court of Appeal and he served in that capacity for about two years. Akamba returned to Ghana in 2001 taking up appointment as Justice of the Court of Appeal. While serving on the Appeal Court bench, he doubled as the acting Director for the Judicial Training School from 2008 to 2011. He was sworn into office as a justice of the Supreme Court of Ghana on 11 November 2012. He served in this capacity for about four years and retired in 2016.

== See also ==
- List of judges of the Supreme Court of Ghana
- Supreme Court of Ghana
- Judiciary of Ghana
