= George Lamptey =

Ghanaian jurist and justice of the Supreme Court of Ghana

Justice George Lantei Lamptey

Supreme Court Judge
- In office 7 December 2000 – 2002
- Appointed by: Jerry Rawlings

Appeal Court Judge
- In office 1989–2000

Personal details
- Born: George Lantei Lamptey
- Spouse: Mary Awule Mele Lamptey
- Education: Durham University
- Occupation: Judge

George Lantei Lamptey is a retired Ghanaian jurist and justice of the Supreme Court of Ghana.

== Early life and education ==
Lamptey is a native of Jamestown, Accra. He was born in Accra on 3 June 1932 to Maa Kowa and Akwete Aku. He had his secondary education at the Accra Academy from 1948 to 1951 and continued at Achimota College for his Higher School Certificate. He later proceeded to the United Kingdom to pursue further studies at the University of Durham from 1955 to 1958. He had his solicitor's education in Newcastle upon Tyne completing in 1961 and returning to Ghana that same year.

== Career ==
His career begun as an Assistant Registrar General in 1962 at Accra. He was also a part-time lecturer at the school of administration, University of Ghana from 1962 to 1965. He became a District Court Judge in 1965 and consequently became a member of the Commonwealth Magistrates Association. He rose through the ranks from a District Court Judge to a High Court Judge and later an Appeal Court Judge in 1989. In 1990, he was an external examiner for the Ghana School of Law. He was appointed Supreme Court Judge in July 2000. He took his oath of office with Justice Theodore Adzoe on 7 December 2000. He retired on 3 June 2002.

== Personal life ==
He was married Mary Awule Mele Lamptey (née Halm) daughter of W.M.Q. Halm the then Ghana ambassador to the United States of America at the Washington DC Cathedral, USA. Together they have three children. He is a devoted Methodist and preaches in selected churches.

== See also ==
- List of judges of the Supreme Court of Ghana
- Supreme Court of Ghana
