= Alfred Augustus Akainyah =

Ghanaian lawyer and jurist

Justice of the Supreme Court of Ghana
- In office 1964–1966
- Nominated by: Dr. Kwame Nkrumah

Personal details
- Born: 2 February 1907 Gold Coast
- Died: 1988 Korle-Bu Teaching Hospital, Accra, Ghana

Alfred Augustus Akainyah (1907–1988) was a Ghanaian lawyer and jurist. He was a barrister-at-law and a Supreme Court Judge during the first republic.

== Early life and education ==
Alfred was of Nzema ethnicity and was born on 2 February 1907. He was the second son John Akainyah; a farmer and Tufuhene of Tikoboh No 2; an Nzema town in the Western Region.

He entered the Gold Coast Police Training College and became a policeman in 1928.

== Career ==
Alfred served in the Gold Coast Police Force from 1928 until 1946 when, having reached the highest position open to an African, he resigned as a chief inspector to pursue law in the United Kingdom. He had been the most senior African lead detective in the investigation into the Kibi Ritual Murder case following the murder in 1943 of Akyea Mensah, a sub chief. He was called to the bar by the Middle Temple on 26 January 1949. Alfred Akainyah entered practice in Accra in the chambers of Lawyer Koi Larbi that same year, working as a private legal practitioner for two years. In 1951 he was appointed district magistrate while serving as treasurer of the Western Nzema State. However, he returned to private practice until 1 September 1962 when he was appointed a High Court Judge. While a high court judge, he was appointed in 1963 to head a commission to investigate irregularities in the allocation of import licences. Two years later, he, together with Fred Apaloo and Charles Sterling Acolatse were appointed Supreme Court Judges to replace Supreme Court Judges who had been dismissed following acquittals in a treason trial. In the subsequent retrial of the accused, they were convicted. Alfred Akainyah, together with Kwesi Armah, a leading member of the CPP and a trusted confidant of Nkrumah, and the Attorney General, Kwaw Swanzy, all of them Nzemas, met with President Nkrumah to plead for leniency for the convicts. Whilst a Justice of the Supreme Court he presided over the trial of Henry Djaba, F Y Asare who was a minister in the Nkrumah government, and James Quartey in the famous GAMCO agricultural fraud. They were convicted and received extensive prison terms. He was dismissed on 7 June 1966 after the overthrow of Nkrumah, even though he had previously tendered his resignation during the NLC regime as a result of adverse charges of corruption levelled against his wife, Victoria Adobea Akainyah, by the Ollenu Commission of Inquiry. His wife was prosecuted and sentenced to prison. He defended his wife on the basis that he was the real target of the persecution. Initially, his wife was represented pro bono by the famed British lawyer Sir Dingle Foot because other local lawyers would not represent her. He resumed private practice as a barrister at law after serving on the bench.

== Personal life ==
He was married to Victoria Adobea Akainyah. He was a Christian of the Anglican denomination, a lay reader and a member of the Saint Luke Anglican Church in Aburi. He was the father of Ghanaian artist Samuel Akainyah of Akainyah gallery. Three of his children also trained as lawyers namely Lawrence Bonzo Akainyah, Emma Amakye and Azanne Kofi Akainyah. Azanne Kofi Akainyah's memoir Seven Stories and More published in 2023 has a wealth of references to his parents.

== Death ==
He died in 1988 at Korle Bu Teaching Hospital, Accra.

== See also ==
- List of judges of the Supreme Court of Ghana
- Supreme Court of Ghana
