= Adisadel College =

Anglican boarding school in Cape Coast, Ghana

- School Crest

Location
- P. O. Box 83; Adisadel Village; Central Region; Cape Coast, Central Region, P.O. Box 83, 00233 Cape Coast; Ghana; 5.1206°N 1.2649°W

Information
- School type: Missionary funding, Public High School All Boys School
- Motto: "Vel Primus Vel Cum Primis" (Either the first or with the first)
- Religious affiliation: Christianity
- Denomination: Anglican
- Patron saint: St. Nicholas
- Established: 4 January 1910; 116 years ago
- Founder: Nathaniel Temple Hamlyn
- Sister school: Mfantsiman Girls' Secondary School
- Headmaster: Samuel Agudogo
- Staff: 98 teachers
- Faculty: 4
- Gender: Boys
- Age: 14 to 18+
- Enrolment: c. 3000
- Average class size: 60
- Campus: 2; Leopoldville & Katanga
- Houses: 12
- Colours: Black and White
- Slogan: Play Up Santaclausians
- Song: Up Santaculausians and Adisadel On the Hill
- Athletics: Yes
- Mascot: Zebra
- Nickname: ADISCO
- Rival: Mfantsipim School
- Newspaper: Owl
- Affiliation: Anglican Church, Ghana
- Alumni: Adisadel Old Boys Association (AOBA)
- Alumni name: Santaclausians
- Website: http://www.adisadelcollege.net

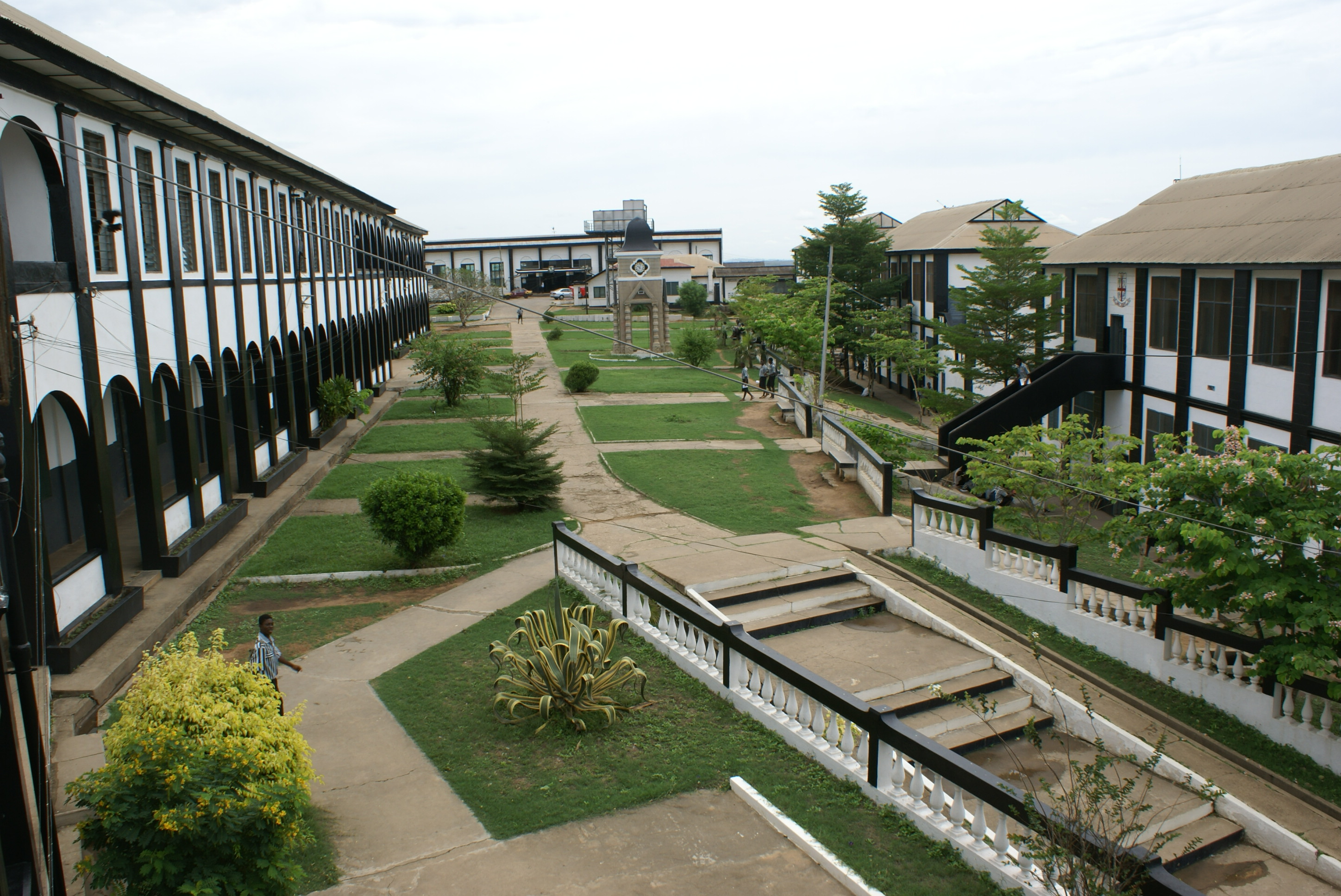
The main Campus "Santa City"

Adisadel College, popularly known as "Adisco", is an Anglican boys' boarding school in Cape Coast, Ghana. It was established by Rt. Rev. Nathaniel T Hamlyn in 1910. Adisadel College is one of the oldest secondary schools in Ghana, and was ranked 10th out of the top 100 best high schools in Africa by Africa Almanac in 2003, based on quality of education, student engagement, strength and activities of alumni, school profile, internet and news visibility. Recently, they were ranked among the best senior high schools in Ghana per WAEC standards and is the best senior high school in Cape Coast according to the YEN in 2024.

== History ==
Adisadel was established in 1910 in a building at Topp Yard, near Christ Church School, which is within the vicinity of Cape Coast Castle. The school began with 29 boys and by 1935, it had expanded to accommodate about 200 pupils. The school buildings were extended in 1950 by Maxwell Fry and Jane Drew. Student enrolment stood at 545, at the time of the school's Golden Jubilee in 1960. By the time the school celebrated its centenary anniversary in 2010, Adisadel could boast about 1500 boarding students and 93 teachers.

The school's original founder was the Rt. Rev. Nathaniel Temple Hamlyn, a missionary who was then Anglican Bishop of Accra between 1908 and 1910. Hamlyn's ambition was to establish a grammar school to educate the sons of Anglicans in the colony, and also create an educational institution which will serve as a training ground for the clergy.

Adisadel College is the second-oldest secondary school in Ghana after Mfantsipim School, an arch rival that was established by the Methodist Church in 1876. Adisco is also one of the most famous high schools in sub-Saharan Africa.

=== Uniform ===
The school uniform comprises black-and-white striped shirt and black shorts, directly reflecting the primary colours of the college. The distinctive outfit has earned Adisco students the nickname of "zebra boys". Prior to the introduction of this style of uniform in the 1990s, students of the old Form One to Form Five stream wore blue shirts and brown khaki shorts, while those in Sixth Form wore white shirts and brown shorts. Adisadel College was the first secondary school in the history of Ghana to design special cloaks for its prefects – red for the head prefect, blue for the other prefects, and green for the assistants – and the tradition persists till this day. Not quite the same for the school's cadet corp, where the commander and second-in-command of the cadet have their cloaks in laurel green, and the adjutants and regemental sargeant majors have theirs in royal blue. Their cloaks can be distinguished from the other prefects by their characterist camouflage fabric on the sleeves and collar.

== Curriculum ==
- Business
- General Science
- Visual Arts
- General Arts

== Extracurricular activities ==
=== Publications ===
- Adisadel On The Hill: The History (1910–2010), by John Samuel Pobee, Vicar General of the Anglican Diocese of Accra. This book was published and launched in March 2010 to coincide with the school's centenary anniversary.
- The Owl is a monthly newsletter for students and alumni of Adisadel College.
- Reminiscences of Adisadel - A short historical sketch of ADISADEL COLLEGE, published in 1980, by G. McLean Amissah.
- Reminiscences Of Adisadel College 1970-1975. Editors: Dr Paul Mensah; Dr Kwesi Bentum, Accra, Ghana: Buck Press Ltd, 2017, ISBN 978-9988-2-7402-3.

== Notable alumni ==
- Head of State: Akwasi Amankwa Afrifa
- Scientists: Ave Kludze, Thomas Mensah, Nii Quaynor
- Speakers of Parliament: Rt.Hon Jacob Hackenburg Griffiths-Randolph, Rt.Hon Ebenezer Sekyi-Hughes
- Chief Justices: Justice George Kingsley Acquah, Justice Philip Edward Archer, Justice Edward Kwame Wiredu and Justice Robert John Hayfron-Benjamin(Botswana)
- Supreme Court judges: Justice Koi Larbi, Justice Henry K. Prempeh, Justice Charles Hayfron-Benjamin and Justice Anselmus Kludze
- Attorney-Generals of Ghana: Edward Nathaniel Moore, Godfred Yeboah Dame

== Former headteachers ==
Name	From	To
G. B. Brown BA	1910	1910
B. P. Haines MA	1910	1910
G. B. Brown BA	1910	1912
Hugh Hare MA(Oxon)	1913	1914
R. Fisher MA(Cantab)	1914	1918
W. Hutton Mensah	1918	1924
S. R. S. Nicholas MA DTh(Durham)	1924	1929
A. J. Knight MA LLB(Cantab)	1929	1937
R. D. Hudson MA(Oxon)	1938	1940
W. G. Harward MA(Oxon)	1947	1952
A. R. H. Dee MA(Sydney)	1954	1955
L. W. Fry MA BSc(Oxon)	1956	1958
T. J. Drury MA(Cantab)	1959	1963
R. T. Orleans-Pobee BA(Lond) MEd(Springfield)	1963	1974
E. A. Jonah BA(Legon)	1974	1982
R. K. Ayitey BA(Ed.)	1982	1991
J. F. K. Appiah-Cobbold BA PGC.	1991	1995
J. E. C. Kitson BA PGCE)	1995	2004
H. K. K. Graham BSc(Hons) PGCE	2005	2014
William Kusi Yeboah	2014	2019
Francis Kwame Agbedanu	2019	2020
Samuel Agudogo	2021	Present

== Recent awards ==
- Winners of the 2016 edition (and runners up on four other occasions) of the National Science and Maths Quiz
- Winners of 2016, 2017, 2018, and 2019 editions of the National Hockey Championship / Citizens International Inter-Schools (CIIS) Hockey fiesta.
- Winners of 2021 National Robotics Championship.
