= E. D. K. Adjabeng =

Supreme Court Judge

Elliot Divine Kwami Adjabeng

Supreme Court Judge
- In office 22 February 1995 – October 2002
- Appointed by: Jerry John Rawlings

Personal details
- Born: Elliot Divine Kwami Adjabeng
- Profession: Judge

Elliot Divine Kwami Adjabeng is a retired Ghanaian Supreme Court Judge. He served on the Supreme Court bench from 1995 to 2002.

Adjabeng hails from Avatime in the Volta Region of Ghana. He was the youngest lawyer to become a judge in 1984 after serving as a lawyer for seven (7) years prior to his appointment to the bench. He was appointed to the Supreme Court Bench on 22 February 1995 by the then president Jerry John Rawlings. He served on the bench from then until October 2002 when he resigned on personal grounds at the age of sixty-four (64), six (6) years less than the mandatory retirement age of seventy (70) years. The then president to whom the resignation letter was addressed to, John Agyekum Kufuor acknowledged the letter and thanked him for his immense service to the nation and also wished him well. While serving on the bench of the Supreme Court, he held a strong stance against the establishment of Fast Track Courts (FTCs) stating that, the creation of a distinct division of the courts with special features could not be valid without an amendment of the High Court rules. He believed that the FTC used a set of guidelines which were different from the rules of the normal High Courts and this was consequently going to undermine the rule of law.

== See also ==
- Fast Track High Court
- List of judges of the Supreme Court of Ghana
- Supreme Court of Ghana
