= List of justices of the Supreme Court of Ghana =

This is a list of the judges of the Supreme Court of Ghana. The Constitution of Ghana provides for the court to be made up of the Chief Justice of Ghana and not less than nine other Justices of the Supreme Court. It shall be duly constituted by at least five Supreme Court judges.

== Appointment of judges ==
Article 144 clause 1 of the 1992 Constitution of Ghana stipulates that the Chief Justice of Ghana is to be appointed by the President of Ghana acting in consultation with the Council of State and with the approval of the Parliament of Ghana. Article 144 clause 2 states that Justices of the Supreme court are appointed on the advice of the Judicial Council in consultation with the Council of State and with the approval of Parliament. Where the position of Chief Justice is vacant or where the holder of the position is unable to perform their duties for a period, the most senior member of the Supreme Court shall act as Chief Justice as in clause 6 of Article 144. In May 2020, President Akufo-Addo appointed four additional judges to the Supreme Court.

== Retirement or removal from office ==
According to Article 145 clause 4 of the constitution, a Supreme Court Judge is expected to vacate their office on reaching the age of seventy years. They can carry on up to an additional six months to ensure that they are able to complete any proceedings they may have been involved in at that stage. The judges are guaranteed job security. Article 146 states the conditions for their removal as "except for stated misbehaviour or incompetence or on ground of inability to perform the functions of his office arising from infirmity of body or mind." The procedure for this has also been clearly stated in the constitution.

== List of judges of the Supreme Court ==
#	Name	Previous judicial office	Served from	Served until	Tenure	Notes	Appointed by
1	Kobina Arku Korsah	Puisne Judge of the Supreme Court	1960	December 1963	3 years, 334 days	Chief Justice of Ghana 1957–1963; Dismissed by Kwame Nkrumah	Kwame Nkrumah
2	William Van Lare	Appeal Court Judge 1957	1960	December 1963	3 years, 334 days	Retired when Supreme Court acquitted Tawia Adamafio and others on treason charges	Kwame Nkrumah
3	Gilbert Granville Sharp	Appeal Court Judge	1960	1961	1 year, 0 days		Kwame Nkrumah
4	Julius Sarkodee-Addo	High Court Judge	1960	February 1966	6 years, 54 days	Chief Justice 1964–1966; Removed after coup d'état	Kwame Nkrumah
5	Augustus Molade Akiwumi	Speaker of the Parliament of Ghana (1958–1960)	July 1960	1961	184 days	Speaker of Parliament of Ghana	Kwame Nkrumah
6	Samuel Azu Crabbe	High Court Judge 1959	15 September 1961	1966	4 years, 162 days	Supreme Court was replaced by the Appeals Court in 1966	Kwame Nkrumah
6	Samuel Azu Crabbe	Appeal Court Judge	1971	1972	1 year, 0 days	Supreme Court replaced by the Appeals Court in 1972; Chief Justice 1973–1977	Edward Akufo-Addo
7	Kofi Adumua Bossman	High Court Judge 2 July 1956 – 1962	15 September 1961	2 March 1964	2 years, 169 days	Dismissed 2 March 1964 by Nkrumah; Member of Constitutional Commission; 1966–1967	Kwame Nkrumah
8	George Commey Mills-Odoi	High Court Judge Jan 1960; Attorney General 1961–1962	1 September 1962	February 1966	3 years, 176 days	Acting Chief Justice (1965)	Kwame Nkrumah
9	Nii Amaa Ollennu	High Court Judge	1 September 1962	1966	3 years, 176 days	Speaker of the Parliament of Ghana 1969–1972	Kwame Nkrumah
10	Robert Samuel Blay	Private legal practitioner	1 September 1962	2 March 1964	1 year, 183 days	Dismissed 2 March 1964 by Nkrumah	Kwame Nkrumah
11	Edward Akufo-Addo	Private legal practitioner	1 September 1962	March 1964	1 year, 183 days	Dismissed 2 March 1964 by Nkrumah. Reinstated by the NLC as an Appeals Court judge. Chief Justice (1966–1970)	Kwame Nkrumah
12	Charles Acolatse	High Court Judge	2 March 1964	1965	−999 years, 61 days		Kwame Nkrumah
13	Alfred Akainyah	High Court Judge	2 March 1964	7 June 1966	2 years, 97 days		Kwame Nkrumah
14	Fred Apaloo	High Court Judge	2 March 1964	1966	1 year, 359 days	Supreme Court replaced by Appeals Court	Kwame Nkrumah
14	Fred Apaloo	Appeal Court Judge	1971	13 January 1972	1 year, 12 days	Supreme Court replaced by Appeals Court	Edward Akufo-Addo
14	Fred Apaloo	Appeal Court Judge	1980	1986	6 years, 0 days	Chief Justice of Ghana 1977–1986; Chief Justice of Kenya 1993–1995	Hilla Limann
15	William Bruce-Lyle	High Court Judge	26 June 1964	7 June 1966	1 year, 346 days	Supreme Court Judge in Zambia 1976–1980.	Kwame Nkrumah
16	Johnson Boateng Siriboe	High Court Judge	26 June 1964	1966	1 year, 243 days	Supreme Court was replaced by the Appeals Court in 1966 by the National Liberation Council	Kwame Nkrumah
16	Johnson Boateng Siriboe	Appeal Court Judge	August 1970	1972	1 year, 165 days	Dismissed by NRC Military government.	Edward Akufo-Addo
17	G. S. Lassey	High Court Judge	1965	1966	1 year, 54 days	Supreme Court replaced by the Appeals Court by the then NLC government.	Kwame Nkrumah
18	E. A. L. Bannerman	Legal adviser to Ghana Police and Ghana Airways (1967–70)	August 1970	20 September 1972	2 years, 50 days	Chief Justice 1970–1972; Sacked by NRC Military government.	Edward Akufo-Addo
19	V. C. R. A. C. Crabbe	Interim Electoral Commissioner	August 1970	1972	1 year, 165 days		Edward Akufo-Addo
19	V. C. R. A. C. Crabbe	Appeal Court Judge	24 October 1980	1981	1 year, 68 days		Hilla Limann
20	Koi Larbi	Member of the Council of State	August 1970	1972	1 year, 165 days	Sacked by NRC Military government.	Edward Akufo-Addo
21	Kwamena Bentsi-Enchill	Dean of the Faculty of law, University of Zambia	1971	30 September 1972	1 year, 273 days		Edward Akufo-Addo
22	H. K. Prempeh	High Court Judge (1960–1964); Private legal practitioner	1971	1972	1 year, 12 days		Edward Akufo-Addo
23	P. D. Anin	Appeal Court Judge (1969–1970)	1971	1972	1 year, 12 days	Supreme Court replaced by Appeals Court	Edward Akufo-Addo
23	P. D. Anin	Appeal Court Judge (1972–1980)	24 October 1980	July 1982	1 year, 270 days	Retired voluntarily in July 1982; Later became a justice of the Appeal Court of the Gambia	Hilla Limann
24	N. Y. B. Adade	Attorney General 1969–1971	24 October 1980	20 February 1996	15 years, 119 days	Acting Chief Justice (1990 to 1991)	Hilla Limann
25	Philip Archer	Appeal Court judge	24 October 1980	1983	2 years, 69 days	Retired in 1983	Hilla Limann
25	Philip Archer	Appointed Chairman of the Law Reform Commission following his retirement as a Supreme Court judge, was called out of retirement in 1991 to serve as Chief Justice of Ghana	1991	21 February 1995	4 years, 51 days	Chief of Justice 1991–1995	Jerry Rawlings
26	E. N. P. Sowah	Appeal Court Judge	24 October 1980	1990	9 years, 69 days	Chief Justice of Ghana 1986–1990	Hilla Limann
27	J. N. K. Taylor	High Court Judge	24 October 1980	24 March 1990	9 years, 151 days		Hilla Limann
28	G. R. M. Francois	Appeal Court Judge	September 1985	5 August 1994	8 years, 338 days		Jerry Rawlings
29	Isaac Wuaku	Appeal Court Judge	1988	29 December 1992	4 years, 363 days		Jerry Rawlings
30	Kweku Etrew Amua-Sekyi	Appeal Court Judge	1988	5 July 1996	8 years, 186 days		Jerry Rawlings
31	Isaac K. Abban	Appeal Court Judge	1988	21 April 2001	13 years, 110 days	Chief Justice of Seychelles 1990–1993; Chief Justice of Ghana. Died in office.	Jerry Rawlings
32	Patrick Victor Osei-Hwere	Appeal Court Judge	1989	19 October 1992	3 years, 292 days		Jerry Rawlings
33	G. E. K. Aikins	Attorney General of Ghana	20 February 1990	2 September 1998	8 years, 194 days		Jerry Rawlings
34	Edward Wiredu	Appeals Court Judge	1990	2003	13 years, 0 days	Chief Justice of Ghana 2001–2003	Jerry Rawlings
35	Joyce Bamford-Addo	Director of Public Prosecutions; 2nd Deputy Speaker of the Consultative Assembly	19 November 1991	October 2004	12 years, 317 days	First female justice of the Supreme Court of Ghana and first female Speaker of the Parliament of Ghana	Jerry Rawlings
36	Charles Hayfron-Benjamin	Private legal practice	19 November 1991	4 April 1999	7 years, 136 days		Jerry Rawlings
37	Francis Kpegah	Appeal Court Judge	6 January 1993	4 December 2008	15 years, 333 days	Acting Chief Justice (25 March 2007 to15 June 2007)	Jerry Rawlings
38	A. K. B. Ampiah	Appeal Court Judge	6 January 1993	25 July 2003	10 years, 200 days		Jerry Rawlings
39	E. D. K. Adjabeng	Appeal Court Judge	22 February 1995	October 2002	7 years, 221 days	Resigned in October 2002 on personal grounds	Jerry Rawlings
40	George Kingsley Acquah	Appeals Court Judge	30 November 1995	25 March 2007	11 years, 115 days	Chief Justice of Ghana. Died in office.	Jerry Rawlings
41	Sophia Akuffo	Private legal practitioner	30 November 1995	20 December 2019	24 years, 20 days	Chief Justice (2017–2019)	Jerry Rawlings
42	Isaac K. Amuah	Appeal Court Judge	30 November 1995	19 August 1997	1 year, 262 days	Died in office	Jerry Rawlings
43	William Atuguba	State attorney	30 November 1995	1 July 2018	22 years, 213 days	Acting Chief Justice (21 February 2017 to 19 June 2017) 23 years in Supreme Court	Jerry Rawlings
44	John Debra Sapong	Appeal Court Judge	15 April 1999	2 June 2000	1 year, 48 days		Jerry Rawlings
45	Josiah Ofori Boateng	Appeal Court Judge	15 April 1999	4 January 2001	1 year, 264 days		Jerry Rawlings
46	Theodore Adzoe	Private legal practitioner	28 November 2000	31 October 2008	7 years, 338 days		Jerry Rawlings
47	George Lamptey	Appeal Court Judge	28 November 2000	3 June 2002	1 year, 187 days		Jerry Rawlings
48	Kwame Afreh	Appeal Court Judge	19 March 2002	September 2003	1 year, 166 days		John Kufuor
49	Georgina Wood	Appeal Court Judge 1991–2002	12 November 2002	7 June 2017	14 years, 207 days	Chief Justice 2007–2017	John Kufuor
50	Samuel Glenn Baddoo	Appeal Court Judge	12 November 2002	3 March 2004	1 year, 122 days		John Kufuor
51	Stephen Alan Brobbey	Appeal Court Judge	12 November 2002	23 May 2012	9 years, 193 days		John Kufuor
52	Seth Twum	Private legal practitioner	12 November 2002	20 March 2007	4 years, 128 days		John Kufuor
53	Anselmus Kludze	Professor of Law at the University of Ghana	21 May 2003	12 March 2004	296 days		John Kufuor
54	Samuel Date-Bah	Special Adviser (Legal) at the Commonwealth Secretariat, London	16 September 2003	August 2014	10 years, 319 days		John Kufuor
55	Tawia Modibo Ocran	Professor of Law at the University of Ghana	14 May 2004	27 October 2008	4 years, 166 days	Died in office	John Kufuor
56	Richard Aninakwah	Appeal Court Judge	15 October 2004	28 January 2008	3 years, 105 days		John Kufuor
57	Julius Ansah	Appeal Court Judge	15 October 2004	2020	15 years, 78 days	Acting Chief Justice (20 December 2019 to 7 January 2020)	John Kufuor
58	Felix Lartey	Chief Justice of the Gambia	15 October 2004	April 2005	168 days		John Kufuor
59	Sophia Adinyira	Appeal Court Judge	15 March 2006	30 July 2019	13 years, 137 days	Judge on United Nations Appeals Tribunal 2009–2016	John Kufuor
60	Samuel Kwadwo Asiamah	Appeal Court Judge	15 March 2006	2009	2 years, 292 days		John Kufuor
61	Anin Yeboah	Justice of the Court of Appeal (2003–2008)	11 June 2008	24 May 2023	14 years, 347 days	Chief Justice (7 January 2020 to 24 May 2023)	John Kufuor
62	Jones Dotse	Appeal Court Judge; Supreme Court Judge in the Gambia	11 June 2008	8 June 2023	14 years, 362 days	Acting Chief Justice (24 May 2023 to 8 June 2023)	John Kufuor
63	Paul Baffoe-Bonnie	Appeal Court Judge	11 June 2008	Incumbent	18 years, 115 days	Chief Justice since 17 November 2025	John Kufuor
64	Rose Constance Owusu	Appeal Court Judge	11 June 2008	June 2014	5 years, 355 days		John Kufuor
65	Vida Akoto-Bamfo	Appeal Court Judge	31 October 2009	14 February 2019	9 years, 106 days		John Atta Mills
66	Benjamin Aryeetey	Appeal Court Judge	31 October 2009	2011	1 year, 62 days		John Atta Mills
67	Nasiru Gbadegbe	Appeal Court Judge	31 October 2009	8 December 2020	11 years, 38 days		John Atta Mills
68	Joseph Akamba	Appeal Court Judg	11 November 2012	2016	3 years, 51 days		John Mahama
69	Anthony Benin	Appeal Court Judge	11 November 2012	January 2020	7 years, 51 days		John Mahama
70	Yaw Appau	Appeal Court Judge	29 June 2015	August 2021	6 years, 33 days		John Mahama
71	Gabriel Pwamang	Private legal practitioner	29 June 2015	Incumbent	11 years, 97 days		John Mahama
72	Nene Amegatcher	Private legal practitioner	3 October 2018	28 July 2023	4 years, 298 days	President of the Ghana Bar Association (2012–2016)	Nana Akufo-Addo
73	Agnes Dordzie	Appeal Court Judge	3 October 2018	2 October 2022	3 years, 364 days		Nana Akufo-Addo
74	Nii Ashie Kotey	Professor of Law at the University of Ghana	3 October 2018	28 July 2023	4 years, 298 days		Nana Akufo-Addo
75	Samuel Marful-Sau	Appeal Court Judge	3 October 2018	10 August 2021	2 years, 311 days	Died in office	Nana Akufo-Addo
76	Mariama Owusu	Appeal Court Judge	17 December 2019	November 2024	10 years, 320 days	President of Ghana chapter, International Association of Women Judges, 2014	Nana Akufo-Addo
77	Avril Lovelace-Johnson	Appeal Court Judge	17 December 2019	Incumbent	6 years, 291 days		Nana Akufo-Addo
78	Gertrude Tokornoo	Appeal Court Judge	17 December 2019	Incumbent	6 years, 291 days	Vice-chair, e-Justice Committee; Judicial Training Institute Board member Chief Justice (Appointed on 12 June 2023)	Nana Akufo-Addo
79	Issifu Omoro Tanko Amadu	Appeal Court Judge	22 May 2020	Incumbent	6 years, 135 days		Nana Akufo-Addo
80	Clemence Jackson Honyenuga	Appeal Court Judge	22 May 2020	4 September 2022	2 years, 105 days	Although officially retired on 4 September 2022, he was granted some time by the Chief Justice (Anin Yeboah) to conclude a pending case. He was removed from the case in February 2023.	Nana Akufo-Addo
81	Joy Henrietta Mensa-Bonsu	Professor of Law at the University of Ghana	26 May 2020	Incumbent	6 years, 131 days		Nana Akufo-Addo
82	Yonny Kulendi	Private legal practitioner	26 May 2020	Incumbent	6 years, 131 days		Nana Akufo-Addo
83	Barbara Frances Ackah-Yensu	Appeal Court Judge	28 December 2022	2 February 2025	2 years, 36 days		Nana Akufo-Addo
84	Samuel Kwame Adibu Asiedu	Appeal Court Judge	28 December 2022	Incumbent	3 years, 280 days		Nana Akufo-Addo
85	George Kingsley Koomson	Appeal Court Judge	5 April 2023	Incumbent	3 years, 182 days		Nana Akufo-Addo
86	Ernest Gaewu	High Court Judge	5 April 2023	Incumbent	3 years, 182 days		Nana Akufo-Addo
87	Henry Anthony Kwofie	Appeal Court Judge	3 January 2024	Incumbent	2 years, 274 days		Nana Akufo-Addo
88	Yaw Darko Asare	Appeal Court Judge	3 January 2024	Incumbent	2 years, 274 days		Nana Akufo-Addo
89	Richard Adjei-Frimpong	Appeal Court Judge	3 January 2024	Incumbent	2 years, 274 days		Nana Akufo-Addo
90	Dennis Dominic Adjei	Appeal Court Judge	3 July 2025	Incumbent	1 year, 93 days		John Mahama
91	Gbiel Simon Suurbaareh	Appeal Court Judge	3 July 2025	Incumbent	1 year, 93 days		John Mahama
92	Senyo Dzamefe	Appeal Court Judge	3 July 2025	Incumbent	1 year, 93 days		John Mahama
93	Philip Bright Mensah	Appeal Court Judge	3 July 2025	12 February 2026	224 days		John Mahama
94	Janapare Bartels-Kodwo	Appeal Court Judge	3 July 2025	Incumbent	1 year, 93 days		John Mahama
95	Hafisata Amaleboba	Appeal Court Judge	3 July 2025	Incumbent	1 year, 93 days		John Mahama
96	Kweku Tawiah Ackaah-Boafo	Appeal Court Judge	3 July 2025	Incumbent	1 year, 93 days		John Mahama
97	Sophia Rosetta Bernasko-Essah	Appeal Court Judge	10 September 2026	Incumbent	24 days	First nominated 2024 by Akufo-Addo but process not completed	John Mahama
98	Edward Amoako Asante	Appeal Court Judge	10 September 2026	Incumbent	24 days	Former President of the ECOWAS Court of Justice	John Mahama
99	Anthony Forson Jr.	Private legal practitioner	10 September 2026	Incumbent	24 days	President of the Ghana Bar Association (2018 - 2021)	John Mahama

== See also ==
- Constitution of Ghana
- Judiciary of Ghana
- Supreme Court of Ghana
