= Edward Kwame Wiredu =

Supreme Court Judge and former Chief Justice of Ghana

Edward Kwame Wiredu JSC

10th Chief Justice of Ghana (22nd including Gold Coast)
- In office 2001–2003
- Appointed by: John Kufuor
- Preceded by: Isaac Kobina Abban
- Succeeded by: George Kingsley Acquah

Personal details
- Born: c 1936
- Died: 31 January 2008, aged 73

Edward Kwame Wiredu JSC (c. 1936 – 31 January 2008) was the Chief Justice of Ghana between 2001 and 2003. He was the tenth since Ghana became an independent nation. He is noted for introducing the Fast Track High Courts in Ghana as well as Alternate Dispute Resolution and the Judicial Institute.

== Early life ==
Edward Wiredu was admitted into Achimota School but left due to an incident. He became a student at Accra Academy and later moved to Adisadel College where he received the Cambridge School Certificate. Wiredu had sixth-form studies in science at the Kumasi College of Science and Technology but did not graduate.

== Career ==
Wiredu studied law at the Inns of Court School in London. He was called to the British bar in 1960 after graduating from Middle Temple. He went on to serve on the Bench for a total of 34 years after having been in private practice. He was appointed a High Court Judge in 1969. After the abortive coup of 15 May 1979, he was noted to have entered a plea of not guilty for Jerry Rawlings although Rawlings himself had pleaded guilty during his trial. In 1980, he was elevated to be an Appeal Court Judge. He became a Supreme Court Judge in 1990. He was appointed Chief Justice in the Fourth Republic by John Kufuor at the beginning of his presidency on 9 November 2001. He is considered by some to be a strong advocate for the independence of the Judiciary. He retired as Chief Justice in May 2003 for health reasons.

== See also ==
- Chief Justice of Ghana
- Judiciary of Ghana
- List of judges of the Supreme Court of Ghana
- Supreme Court of Ghana

Legal offices
Preceded by Isaac Kobina Abban	Chief Justice of Ghana; 2001–2003	Succeeded by George Kingsley Acquah
