= George Francois =

Ghanaian judge (1924–2005)

Supreme Court Judge

Personal details
- Born: George Richard Mcvane Francois; 5 August 1924 Gold Coast (present-day Ghana)
- Died: 21 June 2005 (aged 80) Accra, Ghana
- Parents: George Francois (father); Mercy Stoudt (mother)
- Education: Achimota College
- Profession: Judge

George Richard Mcvane Francois (5 August 1924 – 21 June 2005) was a Ghanaian Supreme Court judge. He contributed to the development of Ghanaian law through some of his important judgments.

== Biography ==
George Richard Mcvane Francois was the first son of George Francois, a merchant from Tafo, in the Ashanti Region. He attended Achimota College prior to studying law in the United Kingdom. He was called to the bar at the Middle Temple on 26 January 1951.

== See also ==
- Supreme Court of Ghana
- List of judges of the Supreme Court of Ghana
