= Cecilia Naa Shormeh Davis =

Ghanaian judge

Her Ladyship Cecilia Naa Shormeh Davis (also known as Justice Cecilia Naa Shormeh Davis) is a Ghanaian judge. In 2016, she was sworn in as a High Court Judge by Georgina Theodora Wood along with 12 others. As at 2020, she presides over the Koforidua High Court. In 2024, Nana Akufo-Addo appointed her as a Justice of the Court of Appeal.
