= Isaac Wuaku =

Ghanaian barrister and judge (1926–2020)

Isaac Newton Kwaku Wuaku

Supreme Court Judge

Personal details
- Born: Isaac Newton Kwaku Wuaku; 29 December 1926 Peki, Gold Coast
- Died: 3 April 2020 (aged 93) Accra, Ghana
- Resting place: Peki
- Spouse(s): Fidelia (m.1964 d.1970); Agnes (m.1971-2010 (deceased))
- Children: Malcolm, Mary-Ann, Irene, Agnes (deceased), Prosper, and Delali
- Education: Mfantsipim School; University College London
- Profession: Judge

Isaac Newton Kwaku Wuaku (29 December 1926 – 3 April 2020) was a Ghanaian barrister and a judge. He was a retired Justice of the Supreme Court of Ghana.

== Early life and education ==
Wuaku hailed from Peki in the Volta Region of Ghana. He was born at Peki, Dzake on 29 December 1926. His mother was Madam Irene Abena Kuma Drah, the second wife of Mr. Agodzo Kofi Wuaku, a renowned carpenter/farmer from the Lemenyigbe Clan of Peki, Avetile. He was the first of four children from the marriage. He had his secondary education at Mfantsipim School, Cape Coast in the 1940s. He later proceeded to University College London for his tertiary education. He completed his law studies at the Middle Temple in 1957 and consequently became Peki's first lawyer.

== Career ==
Wuaku worked at Opoku Akyeampong and Company as a private legal practitioner. After the dissolution of the partnership, Wuaku established his own practice in Ho. As a token of gratitude to his cousin and mentor, Mr. Seth Elewosi Kwame Wuaku, Wuaku conducted his practice under the name Elewosi Chambers. He was later called to bench and served in Cape Coast and Sunyani prior to his elevation to the Appeals Court bench. He was later appointed Justice of the Supreme Court of Ghana. After his retirement he was appointed by the then president John Agyekum Kufuor to chair a three-man committee to investigate the Yendi crisis.

== See also ==
- List of judges of the Supreme Court of Ghana
- Supreme Court of Ghana
