= Dormaa Senior High School =

Coordinates: 7.277°N 2.860°W

Location
- Dormaa-Ahenkro, Dormaa Central; Municipality of the Bono, Ghana

Information
- Former name: Dormaa State Collage
- School type: Pre-tertiary Institution
- Motto: Knowledge is Power
- Founded: 24 February 1947
- Founders: Samuel Kwadwo Oppong and Joseph Manase Yeboah
- Educational authority: Ghana Education Service
- Headmaster: Mr. Nicholas Asamoah
- Color(s): White, Green
- Website: http://www.dormaashs.com

Dormaa Senior High School, also known as DORMASS, is a pre-tertiary institution located in Dormaa-Ahenkro in the Dormaa Central, Municipality of the Bono Region of Ghana.

== History ==
Dormaa Senior High School was established on 24 February 1947 by Samuel Kwadwo Oppong and Joseph Manase Yeboah, both teachers by profession. With only a single registered student at the time, the school was originally named Dormaa State College. The school began in a wooden, single-story building that belonged to the Dormaa Gyaasehene called Nana Kwasi Baah. Before it was established as a high school, the highest qualification one could receive was Middle school form 4. Without any secondary school in the entire Brong-Ahafo area, students were not able to further their education to the secondary level. The Dormaa State College became the first secondary school between the Brong Ahafo and Ashanti Regions.

The school celebrated its 75th anniversary in 2022.

== Operations ==
The school is under the Ghana Education Service of the Government of Ghana. The school has a boarding facility and a student population of about 4,500. The school has 152 teaching and 48 non-teaching staff. Subjects taught include Agriculture, Business, Home Economics, Visual Arts, General Arts, and General Science.

The school runs 6 courses and has 6 houses for student accommodation.

== Courses ==
- General Science
- General Arts
- Business
- Agricultural science
- Visual Arts
- Home Economics
