= Anselmus Kludze =

Ghanaian judge

Justice Anselmus Kodzo Paaku Kludze

Supreme Court Judge
- In office 21 May 2003 – 12 March 2004
- Appointed by: John Kufuor

Personal details
- Born: 1934 Hohoe, Volta Region, Ghana
- Died: 5 October 2013 (aged 78–79)
- Children: Ave Kludze, Ativoe Kludze (died 2004) Maabo Kludze, Norde Kludze, Attor Kludze, and three others
- Education: University of Ghana; University of London

Anselmus Kodzo Paaku Kludze (1934 – 5 October 2013) was a Ghanaian lawyer, author and academic who served as a judge for the Supreme Court of Ghana and was also a professor. He was an Emeritus Professor of law at Rutgers University, Camden, New Jersey, United States, a chairman of the Law Reform Commission of Ghana, a Fellow of the Ghana Academy of Arts and Sciences and a fellow of the Royal Society of Arts, London.

== Early life and education ==
Kludze was born in 1934 to Stephen Komla Kludze. He hailed from Gbi-Kpeme, Hohoe in the Volta Region of Ghana. His father died at early age while he was studying at Adisadel College, Cape Coast on a government scholarship, his uncle, Anku Kludze however supported him financially to complete his secondary education. After his secondary education, he entered the University of Ghana where he obtained his Bachelor of Arts degree in 1963. He continued at the Ghana School of Law where he qualified as a barrister in 1965. He proceeded to the United Kingdom for further studies in law and was awarded his doctorate degree in 1969. In 2002, he earned a Higher Doctorate degree of LL.D. for his scholarship from the University of London.

== Career ==
=== Academic ===
Kludze joined the Law Faculty as a senior lecturer at the University of Ghana and taught at the Ghana School of Law while a visiting professor at the Temple University School of Law. He was also a professor of law and dean of the Faculty of Law at the University of Calabar, Nigeria. Prior to entering academia, he was a barrister-at-law and solicitor of the Supreme Court of Ghana.

=== Justice of the Supreme Court of Ghana ===
Kludze was appointed a justice of the Supreme Court of Ghana by the then president of Ghana, John Kufuor on 21 May 2003. He served in that capacity until his retirement on 12 March 2004.

== Personal life ==
He is the father of Ave Kludze, a rocket scientist with the National Aeronautic and Space Administration (NASA). Kludze is also the father of Maabo Kludze, a New York-based clinical pharmacist and senior director at a healthcare company; Norde Kludze, a Pennsylvania-based lawyer and founder of Kludze and Associates; and Attor Kludze, a Maryland-based senior private banker.

== Publications ==
- Ewe Law of Property (1973) London: Sweet and Maxwell

== See also ==
- List of judges of the Supreme Court of Ghana
- Supreme Court of Ghana
