= J. N. K. Taylor =

Ghanaian supreme court judge

John Nicholas Kobina Taylor

Supreme Court Judge
- In office 1980 – March 1990

Personal details
- Born: John Nicholas Kobina Taylor; 1925
- Died: 15 August 2008 (aged 82–83)
- Profession: Judge

John Nicholas Kobina Taylor (1925-2008) was a Ghanaian judge. He served on the Ghanaian judicial bench for about twenty-one (21) years. He was a Supreme Court judge from 1980 to 1990.

== Biography ==
Taylor was born in 1925 and hails from Korankyekrom, Saltpond in the Central Region of Ghana.

Taylor served as a Crown Counsel, State Attorney, Director of Public Prosecutions and also Acting Attorney-General and Commissioner for Justice in 1969. He joined the bench around the period as a High Court judge. As a High Court judge, he was appointed chairman of the Taylor Assets Commission. The commission's mandate was to investigate the assets of public officials and to ascertain if these assets were legally acquired. After about ten years of service to the High Court bench he was appointed to the Supreme Court without promotion to the Appeal Court. As a Supreme Court judge he was the chairman of a three-member committee appointed to investigate the leakage of examination and other related matters in the West African Examination Council. He retired in March 1990 at the then compulsory retirement age of sixty-five (65) years. He died on 15 August 2008 at the age of 83.

== See also ==
- List of judges of the Supreme Court of Ghana
- Supreme Court of Ghana
