= Samuel Kwadwo Asiamah =

Supreme Court Judge

Supreme Court Judge
- In office 15 March 2006 – 2009
- Appointed by: John Kufuor

Personal details
- Born: 6 June 1938 (age 87)
- Spouse: Dinah Frimpomaah Asiamah (deceased)
- Children: 2 daughters and 3 sons
- Profession: Teacher, Judge

Samuel Kwadwo Asiamah is a former Ghanaian Supreme Court Judge.

== Early life and career ==
Born on 6 June 1938, Asiamah attended O'Reilly Secondary School (now O'Reilly Senior High School) from 1958 to 1962 and the Advanced Teacher Training College in Winneba (now the University of Education, Winneba) from 1968 to 1970 where he obtained the Teacher's Certificate 'A' and Specialist Certificate in English. He earned his LL.B. Hons from the University of Ghana, and his B.L. from the Ghana School of Law, subsequently being called to the Bar in 1978.

== Career ==
In 1979, Asiamah was appointed as a Magistrate Gd. II, and served in various capacities on the bench in different parts of Ghana until he reached the Court of Appeal in June 2002. Before joining the bench, Asiamah served as a trained teacher for seven years.

He was appointed to the Supreme Court of Ghana by John Kufuor in his capacity as the President of Ghana in March 2006. He was sworn in together with Sophia Adinyira on the same day. During his vetting, Asiamah made it clear that he was against capital punishment.

== See also ==
- List of judges of the Supreme Court of Ghana
- Judiciary of Ghana
