= William Atuguba =

Justice of the Supreme Court of Ghana

Justice William Atuguba

Supreme Court Judge
- In office 30 November 1995 – 1 July 2018
- Appointed by: Jerry Rawlings

Personal details
- Children: 7
- Education: Notre Dame Seminary Senior High School, Navrongo; Tamale Senior High School; University of Ghana; Ghana School of Law
- Occupation: Judge
- Profession: Barrister

William Anaam Atuguba is a retired justice of the Supreme Court of Ghana.

== Education ==
He attended Notre Dame Seminary Senior High School, Navrongo for his 'O' Level certificate and Tamale Senior High School for his 'A' Level certificate before moving to the University of Ghana and the Ghana School of Law for legal studies and training.

== Career ==
Atuguba was first enrolled as a magistrate on 3 October 1974. He has worked as a private lawyer and served as a prosecutor and state attorney before being appointed a Supreme Court Judge by President Rawlings in 1995. He was the acting Chief Justice from May 25, 2016, until June 3, 2016, while Justice Georgina Theodora Woode was outside the country on official duties. He was for a period, the most senior judge in the Supreme Court. He acted as Chief Justice from 21 February 2017 prior to the retirement of Georgina Theodora Wood on 8 June 2017 until 19 June 2017 when Sophia Akuffo was sworn in by President Akufo-Addo as the new Chief Justice.

He has been one of the longest serving members of the Supreme Court of Ghana. He was a judge for 44 years and a Supreme Court judge from 1995 to 2018, a total of almost 23 years.

== Speeches and Lectures ==
The retired Justice of the Supreme Court has been very active in giving speeches and public lectures on happenings in Ghana. He said there is a tendency of Members of Parliament placing party loyalty and personal interest above the national interest. He also said that this approach had led to a poor cultural democratic practices in Ghana, where political parties seemed to be more interested in gaining power than serving the people of the country. He added that debates in partiament are geared towards political affiliation rather than the country's interest.

He was speaking in Parliament of Ghana during the 20th memorial lecture in honour of the late Justice Daniel Francis Annan, the first Speaker of Parliament under the Fourth Republic.

== Personal life ==
William Atuguba has 7 children.

== See also ==
- List of judges of the Supreme Court of Ghana
- Supreme Court of Ghana
