= A. K. B. Ampiah =

Supreme Court Judge

Alexander Kobina Baah Ampiah

Supreme Court Judge
- In office 6 January 1993 – 25 July 2003
- Appointed by: Jerry John Rawlings

Personal details
- Born: Alexander Kobina Baah Ampiah
- Profession: Judge

Alexander Kobina Baah Ampiah is a retired Ghanaian Supreme Court Judge. He served on the Supreme Court bench from 1993 to 2003. Prior to serving on the Supreme Court bench, he was a lawyer who rose through the ranks as a judge of the High Court to the bench of the Appeals Court of Ghana.

== Career ==
Ampiah studied law in the UK. He qualified as a barrister and practised privately at Aumog chambers at Cape Coast, in partnership with Mr. Justice Isaac Kobina Donkor Abban, who later joined the judiciary service and subsequently became Chief Justice from 2001 to 2006. Ampiah rose through the ranks from a High Court judge to an Appeals Court judge prior to his appointment to the Supreme Court Bench on 6 January 1993. While in the judiciary service, he served as the president of the Ghana Football Association (GFA) Congress, the highest decision-making body of the association. Ampiah retired as a Supreme Court Judge on 25 July 2003. In 2009 he was appointed chairman of the University of Cape Coast council by the then president of Ghana; John Evans Atta Mills. In 2011 he was awarded the Order of the Volta award for his service to the nation.

== See also ==
- List of judges of the Supreme Court of Ghana
- Supreme Court of Ghana
