= Charles Hayfron-Benjamin =

Ghanaian Supreme Court Judge

Supreme Court Judge
- In office 1993–1999
- Appointed by: Jerry Rawlings

Personal details
- Died: 9 July 2007 (aged 78)
- Spouse: Doris Hayfron-Benjamin
- Profession: Judge

Charles Hayfron-Benjamin (died 8 July 2007) was a Ghanaian Supreme Court Judge. Hayfron-Benjamin had his secondary education at the Adisadel College, Cape Coast, in the Central Region of Ghana. He went on to study law. He was in private legal practice in Ghana prior to being appointed a Supreme Court Judge by Jerry Rawlings, President of Ghana in 1993.

Hayfron-Benjamin retired in 1999 but continued to work with the Continuing Legal Education programme of the Ghana judiciary until 2002. He died in 2007, aged 78, following an illness.

== See also ==
- List of judges of the Supreme Court of Ghana
- Supreme Court of Ghana
- Judiciary of Ghana
