= Theodore Kwami Adzoe =

Supreme Court Judge

Supreme Court Judge
- In office 26 July 2000 – 31 October 2008
- Appointed by: Jerry Rawlings

Personal details
- Spouse: Joana Abla Adzoe
- Profession: Judge

Theodore Kwami Adzoe was a Ghanaian Supreme Court Judge.

== Early education ==
Adzoe had his primary education at the Evangelical Presbyterian Church Primary School at Taviefe in the Volta Region of the then Gold Coast, now Ghana between 1952 and 1957. He continued with Middle school at the E. P. Middle School, also at Taviefe. His secondary education was at the Peki Secondary School also in the Volta region where he passed the GCE Ordinary Level examinations in 1965. He went on to Mfantsipim School in the Central Region for his GCE Advanced Level in 1967. Adzoe then entered the University of Ghana where he obtained the Bachelor of Laws degree. He completed his professional legal training at the Ghana School of Law in Accra.

== Career ==
Adzoe was called to the Ghana Bar in 1973. He worked as a private legal practitioner for twenty-seven years before being appointed a Supreme Court Judge by the President of Ghana on 26 July 2000. He was sworn in by Jerry Rawlings on 28 November 2000. He held this position until his retirement on 31 October 2008. He was one of the judges that sat on the case brought by Tsatsu Tsikata challenging the constitutionality of the Fast Track Courts set up by the Kufuor government which was trying him for causing financial loss to the state. In April 2006, Theodore Adzoe's wife, Mrs Joana Abla Adzoe filed a case at the Supreme Court against the Chief Justice of Ghana and the Attorney General of Ghana as a citizen of Ghana, asking that the court declare that the Judicial Council of Ghana acted against the provisions of the 1992 Ghanaian Constitution in dismissing her husband on medical grounds.

== See also ==
- List of judges of the Supreme Court of Ghana
- Judiciary of Ghana
- Supreme Court of Ghana
