= Robert John Hayfron-Benjamin =

Ghanaian lawyer and judge (1929–2000)

Appeal Court Judge
- In office 1976–1977
- In office 1981–1997

Chief Justice of Botswana
- In office 1977–1981
- Preceded by: George O. L. Dyke
- Succeeded by: James Aiden O'Brien Quinn

High Court Judge
- In office 24 June 1964 – 1976

Personal details
- Born: 9 April 1929 Gold Coast
- Died: 22 September 2000 (aged 71)
- Relations: John Mensah Sarbah (grandfather)
- Education: University of London (LLB); Middle Temple
- Occupation: Lawyer and judge

Robert John Hayfron-Benjamin (9 April 1929 – 22 September 2000) was a Ghanaian lawyer and judge. He was the Chief Justice of Botswana and an Appeal Court judge in Ghana. He was also the chairman of the Ghana Law Reform Commission and the deputy speaker of the Consultative Assembly that was established to help draft and interpret the 1992 constitution.

== Biography ==
Hayfron-Benjamin was born on 9 April 1929 in Ghana (then the Gold Coast).

He attended Adisadel College in Cape Coast. He studied at the University of London for his Bachelor of Laws degree and proceeded to Middle Temple, London, to study law. He was called to the bar in 1955.

Hayfron-Benjamin begun as a private legal practitioner in Ghana from 1955 to 1963, when he was appointed Principal State Attorney. On 24 June 1964, he was called to the bench of the High Court of Ghana and in 1966, he doubled as a Solicitor General. He served as a High Court judge from 1964 until 1976, when he was elevated to Appeal Court bench.

In 1977, Hayfron-Benjamin was appointed Chief Justice of Botswana. He served in that capacity until 1981. After his judicial service in Botswana, he returned to Ghana and resumed in his previous post as Justice of the Court of Appeal. He served in this capacity until his retirement from judicial service in 1997. In 1991, he was elected deputy speaker of the Consultative Assembly, an assembly that was established to help draft and interpret the 1992 constitution.

Hayfron-Benjamin died on 22 September 2000, aged 71.

== Personal life ==
Hayfron-Benjamin was married, with three sons and a daughter. Hayfron-Benjamin was the grandson of John Mensah Sarbah.

== Awards ==
- Member of the Order of the Volta. (1977)

== See also ==
- Chief Justice of Botswana
