= Patrick Victor Osei-Hwere =

Ghanaian Supreme Court Judge

Supreme Court Judge
- In office 1989 – 19 October 1992
- Appointed by: Jerry John Rawlings

Personal details
- Born: Patrick Victor Osei-Hwere
- Profession: Judge

Patrick Victor Osei-Hwere was a Justice of the Supreme Court of Ghana. He served on the Supreme Court bench from 1989 to 1992. Prior to his appointment to the Supreme Court, he served as an Appeal Court judge from 1984 until 1989.

As a judge, Osei-Hwere begun as a Magistrate in Accra in 1962, rising through the ranks as a Circuit Court judge in Ho, and later a High Court judge. Osei-Hwere became an Appeal Court judge in 1984 and in 1989, he was appointed to the Supreme Court bench by the PNDC government. He retired on 19 October 1992.
