= Nasiru Sulemana Gbadegbe =

Ghanaian judge (1950–2025)

Justice Nasiru Sulemana Gbadegbe

Justice of the Supreme Court of Ghana
- In office 2009–2020
- Appointed by: John Atta Mills

Appeal Court Judge
- In office 1999–2009
- Nominated by: Jerry John Rawlings

High Court Judge
- In office 1989–1999
- President: Jerry John Rawlings

Personal details
- Born: 8 December 1950 British Togoland
- Died: 5 April 2025 (aged 74)
- Education: University of Ghana; Ghana School of Law
- Profession: Judge

Nasiru Sulemana Gbadegbe (8 December 1950 – 5 April 2025) was a Ghanaian lawyer and judge. He was a justice of the Supreme Court of Ghana between 2009 and 2020.

== Early life and education ==
Gbadegbe hailed from the Volta Region of Ghana. He was born on 8 December 1950. He obtained his bachelor of laws (LLB) degree in 1973 from the University of Ghana and subsequently received his qualifying Certificate in Law from the Ghana School of Law in 1975.

== Career ==
Prior to Gbadegbe's appointment to the Supreme Court of Ghana in 2009, he had served on the Ghanaian bench for twenty years. He was appointed Justice of the High Court in 1989 and served in that capacity for a decade. In 1999, he was elevated to the Court of Appeal and he remained in that post until 2009 when he was appointed justice of the Supreme Court.

== Appointment ==
Gbadegbe was nominated in 2009 by then president of Ghana, John Evans Atta Mills. He was vetted on Monday 12 October 2009 and approved unanimously by parliament on 30 October that same year. He was sworn into office by the then president on 2 November 2009.

== Later life and death ==
Gbadegbe retired in December 2020 from the Supreme Court after giving his valedictory judgement after thirty-one years' service in the judiciary.

Gbadegbe died on 5 April 2025, at the age of 74.

== See also ==
- List of judges of the Supreme Court of Ghana
- Supreme Court of Ghana
