= Johnson Boateng Siriboe =

Ghanaian judge

Supreme Court Judge
- In office 1970 – 13 January 1972
- Appointed by: Kofi Abrefa Busia
- In office 1964 – 24 February 1966
- Appointed by: Kwame Nkrumah

Personal details
- Born: Johnson Yaw Kusi Bodum Boateng Siriboe
- Died: July 16, 2001 (aged 81–82)
- Spouse: Esme Siriboe
- Profession: Judge

Johnson Yaw Kusi Bodum Boateng Siriboe was a Ghanaian barrister and judge. He was a justice of the Supreme Court of Ghana from 1964 to 1966 and from 1971 to 1972.

== Biography ==
=== Early years ===
Siriboe hails from Asante Juaben in the Ashanti Region of Ghana. He was a purchasing Clerk of the Produce Buying Company (PBC) until 1946 when he proceeded to United Kingdom to study law. He was called to the Bar in 1949 upon his return to the Gold Coast and subsequently begun private legal practice. He later established his own chambers.

=== Career ===
Upon his return to the Gold Coast, Siriboe worked in private practice at the Chambers of Edward Asafu-Adjaye in Kumasi. He began his career at the bench as a magistrate, replacing William Bruce-Lyle at Swedru. He later worked as a judge at the Circuit Court in Cape Coast, and a High Court judge prior to his appointment to the Supreme Court bench together William Bruce-Lyle in 1964. In 1966, following the overthrow of Kwame Nkrumah, the then incumbent government, the National Liberation Council replaced the Supreme Court with the Appeal Court and excluded him and other public officials who served on Ghana's judicial bench during the first republic. He was later appointed an Appeal Court judge and in August 1970 he was appointed justice of the Supreme Court of Ghana. He served in this capacity until 1972 when the Supreme Court was abolished once more by the then ruling military government, the National Redemption Council. He was the chairman of a 16-man Electoral Commission that was tasked to review and make recommendations on any issue relating to elections in Ghana established by any national legislature under the constitution that was to be drafted by the constitution commission. He was also Chairman of the Chieftaincy Secretariat.

=== Personal life ===
He was married to Esme Siriboe, together they founded the Morning Star School, Cantonments, Accra.

=== Death ===
He died in a motor accident in Osino in the Eastern Region on Monday, 16 July 2001 at the age of 85. He was buried on 8 September 2001 at his hometown Asante Juaben.

== See also ==
- List of judges of the Supreme Court of Ghana
- Supreme Court of Ghana
