= Henrietta Mensa-Bonsu =

Ghanaian lawyer & judge (born 1957)

Justice Henrietta Mensa-Bonsu JSC, FGA

Justice of the Supreme Court of Ghana
- Incumbent
- Assumed office 2020
- Nominated by: Nana Akufo-Addo

Personal details
- Born: Henrietta Joy Abena Nyarko; 29 October 1957 (age 68) Kumasi, Ashanti Region
- Education: Wesley Girls' High School
- Alma mater: University of Ghana; Ghana School of Law; Yale University
- Profession: Judge

Henrietta Joy Abena Nyarko Mensa-Bonsu, JSC, FGA (born 29 October 1957) is a Supreme Court Judge of the Republic of Ghana. She was nominated by president Nana Akufo-Addo. She is the 5th female member of the Court. Prior to her appointment to the Supreme Court, she was a Ghanaian law professor who served as a member of the United Nations Independent Panel on Peace Operations.

== Early life and education ==
Henrietta Joy Abena Nyarko was born on 29 October 1957 in Kumasi.

She attended Wesley Girls High School for both her ordinary level certificate and advanced level certificate obtained in 1975 and 1977 respectively. She continued at University of Ghana where she graduated with Bachelor of Laws (LLB) in 1980 and studied at the Ghana School of Law from 1980 to 1982. She was called to the Ghana bar in 1982. She had postgraduate studies at Yale University, obtaining a Master of Laws (LLM) in 1985.

== Career ==
Mensa-Bonsu was employed as a law lecturer at the University of Ghana in 1985 and rose through the ranks to attain full professorship in 2002. In 2003, she was elected a Fellow of the Ghana Academy of Arts and Sciences. Some academic positions held by Mensa-Bonsu at University of Ghana include been Director of the Legon Centre for International and Advanced Diplomacy and the acting Dean of the Faculty of Law. She was elected president of the Ghana Academy of Arts and Sciences in 2019.

She has used platforms available to her to advocate for peace to accelerate national development. She was the guest speaker at the Second Annual Peace Lecture put together by the Accra West chapter of the Rotary Club and the Institute for Democratic Governance (IDEG), where she spoke about the "need to nurture peace" without waiting "till the need arises for peace before we go for it". She delivered the 2014 University of Ghana Alumni Association lecture on the topic "The African Union’s Peace and Security Architecture: A guarantor of peace and security on the continent”.

In 2017, Mensa-Bonsu failed in her bid to be elected as a Judge of the International Criminal Court (ICC). She was a member of the Presidential Commission of Enquiry which probed the Ayawaso West Wuogon by-election violence.

== Supreme Court appointment ==
Mensa-Bonsu was nominated by Nana Addo Danquah Akufo-Addo, the President of Ghana, in May 2020 for consideration for appointment to the Supreme Court of Ghana.

Her name was submitted with those of three other judges by President Akufo-Addo to parliament for appointment to the Supreme Court bench. The others were Justice Clemence Jackson Honyenuga, Justice Issifu Omoro Tanko Amadu and Justice Emmanuel Yonny Kulendi. She was approved by the Parliament after she was recommended by the Appointment Committee. She was sworn into office by the President Nana Akufo-Addo.

== Personal life ==
Henrietta Joy Abena Nyarko married Kwaku Mensa-Bonsu. They have three daughters, five grandchildren, three foster sons and three foster grandchildren.

== See also ==
- Supreme Court of Ghana
- List of judges of the Supreme Court of Ghana
- Ghana Academy of Arts and Sciences
