= O'Reilly Senior High School =

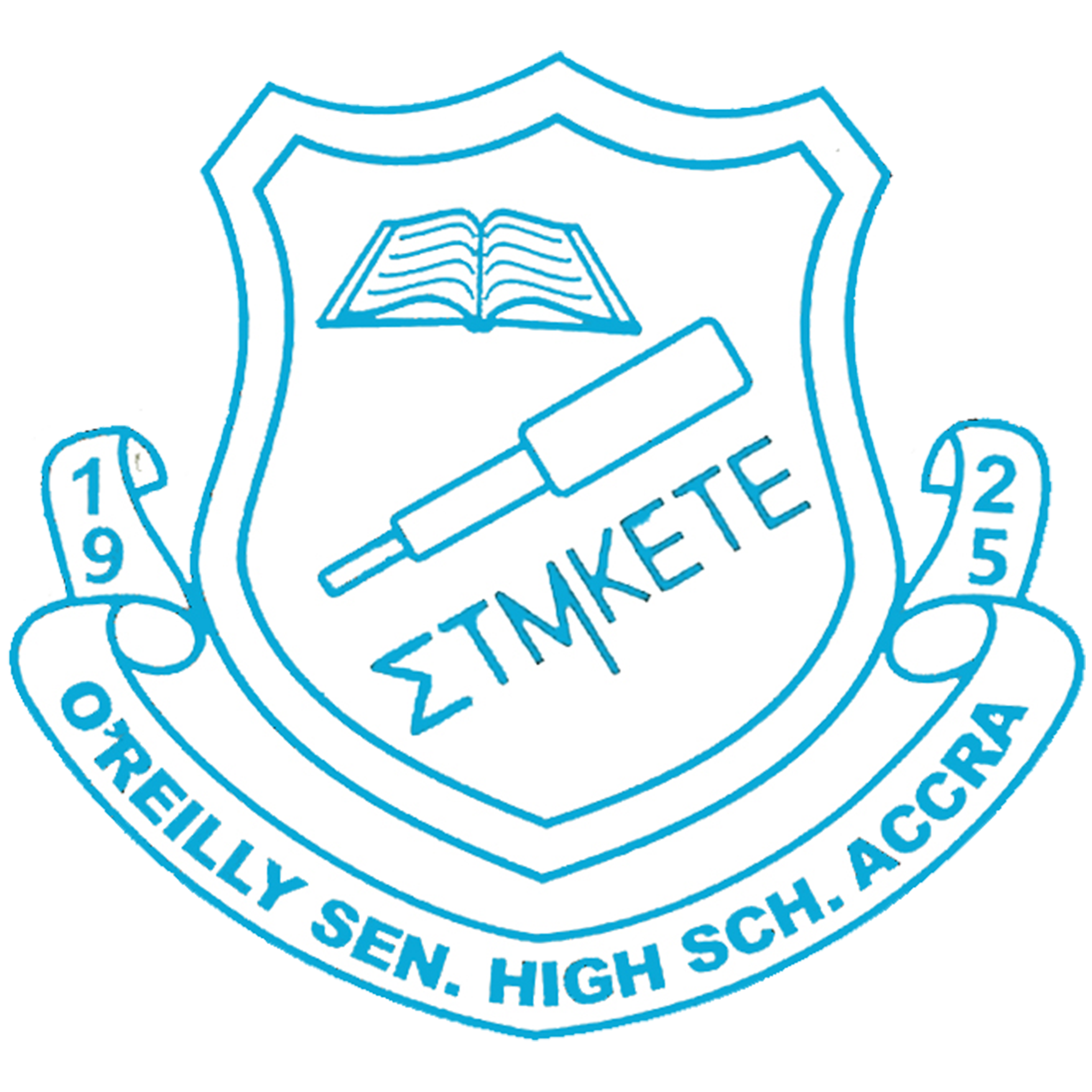

Location
- 1St Circular Cl, Okpoi Gonno; Teshie; Greater Accra; Accra; Ghana; 05°37′36.1884″N 0°06′58.392″W

Information
- Former names: O'Reilly Secondary School
- School type: Boarding and day secondary school
- Motto: Ztmkete (Steadfast)
- Religious affiliation: Non-denominational Christian
- Denomination: Non-denominational
- Opened: 25 August 1925; 101 years ago
- Founder: Ezekiel Festus O'Reilly
- Status: Active
- School board: Board of Governors
- School district: Ledzokuku-Krowor Municipal District
- Authority: Ministry of Education
- Oversight: Ghana Education Service
- Chairperson: Chairperson of the Board of Governors
- Grades: Forms 1–3 (10th–12th grades)
- Gender: Co-educational
- Age range: 14 to 18 years
- Enrollment: ca. 1,200
- Education system: Senior High School
- Campus: 1St Circular Cl, Teshie Okpoi Gonno (GZ-148-1345)
- Campus size: 1,300 acres (525 hectares)
- Campus type: Residential garden-style Setting
- Houses: 4
- Colours: Blue and White
- Slogan: Anyɛɛwɔ!!!
- Song: "We are Student of O'Reilly School"
- Nickname: O'REISCO
- Publication: "The O'Reiscan"
- Address: P. O. Box 238, Adabraka, Accra, Greater Accra, Ghana
- Website: oreillyseniorhighschool.com

O'Reilly Senior High School (/əʊˈraɪliː/ oh-RY-lee), popularly known as "O'REISCO" is a co-educational boarding school located at Okpoi-Gonno in the Ledzokuku-Krowor Municipal District, Accra, Ghana.

== History ==
The school was established in August 1925 by a Sierra Leonean Anglican priest Rev. Ezekiel Festus O'Reilly. O'Reilly Senior High School is the fourth oldest senior high school in Ghana and second oldest in the Greater Accra Region behind Accra High School, Adisadel College and Mfantsipim School. The name of the school was first known as O'Reilly Educational Institute. The school was officially declared open by the Hon. Dowuona - Hammond, the then Minister of Education. The school was founded with the sole aim of providing education for ambitious lads of poor parents. The school was to provide a complete course of education lasting twelve years from the infant up to the school leaving - examination. The kindergarten section was the first to be established in 1925 and by nearly 1927, 200 small children were attending the school.

The first location of the school was at Korle Wokon (North of Ussher Town) in the basement of a large house in Accra owned Barrister Silas Dove. As the population of the school grew, it became imperative to provide a more spacious place for the school. In 1926, decided to undertake a fund raising tour through the Gold Coast and Nigeria. The project was very successful and therefore he started looking for a new site for new buildings.

Fortunately, he had become acquainted with Francis Dove a Barrister and Leader of the Gold Coast Bar, the elder brother of Mr. Silas Dove who gave him a large plot at Tudu for the construction of buildings for the school. Rev. O'Reilly with the help of the teachers and pupils constructed the buildings by 1927. On 20 October 1961, the school moved from Tudu into a building at James Town previously occupied by Accra Academy. This was meant to be a temporary arrangement because the school was in the process of acquiring a permanent site at Kokomlemle. However this couldn't materialize.

Again the population of the school was increasing and facilities needed to be extended and therefor had to leave James Town into a rented premises at Kokomlemle. The school stayed hear for years. Then again, around the mid 1980s, the landlord of the Kokomlemle premises ejected the school. This action led the school to the massive loss of documents and properties of the school. But by the Grace of God settled at Adabraka. The school settled in a 3- story building structure just behind the Holy Spirit Cathedral.

In August 2010, the Ghana Education Service directed the school to stop accepting new entrants and prepare for closure. The owners of the building housing the school decided that since the Service could not afford to purchase the building, they would no longer lease it to the Service. However, in December of that year, the Service developed a plan to move the school to a new location. The School is now located at Teshie Okpoi-Gonno. The new building constructed to accommodate the student is good enough for teaching and class activity. The school offers all courses that individuals aspire to pursue. Curriculum Activities involve: Sports, inter-departmental debate, Quizzes etc

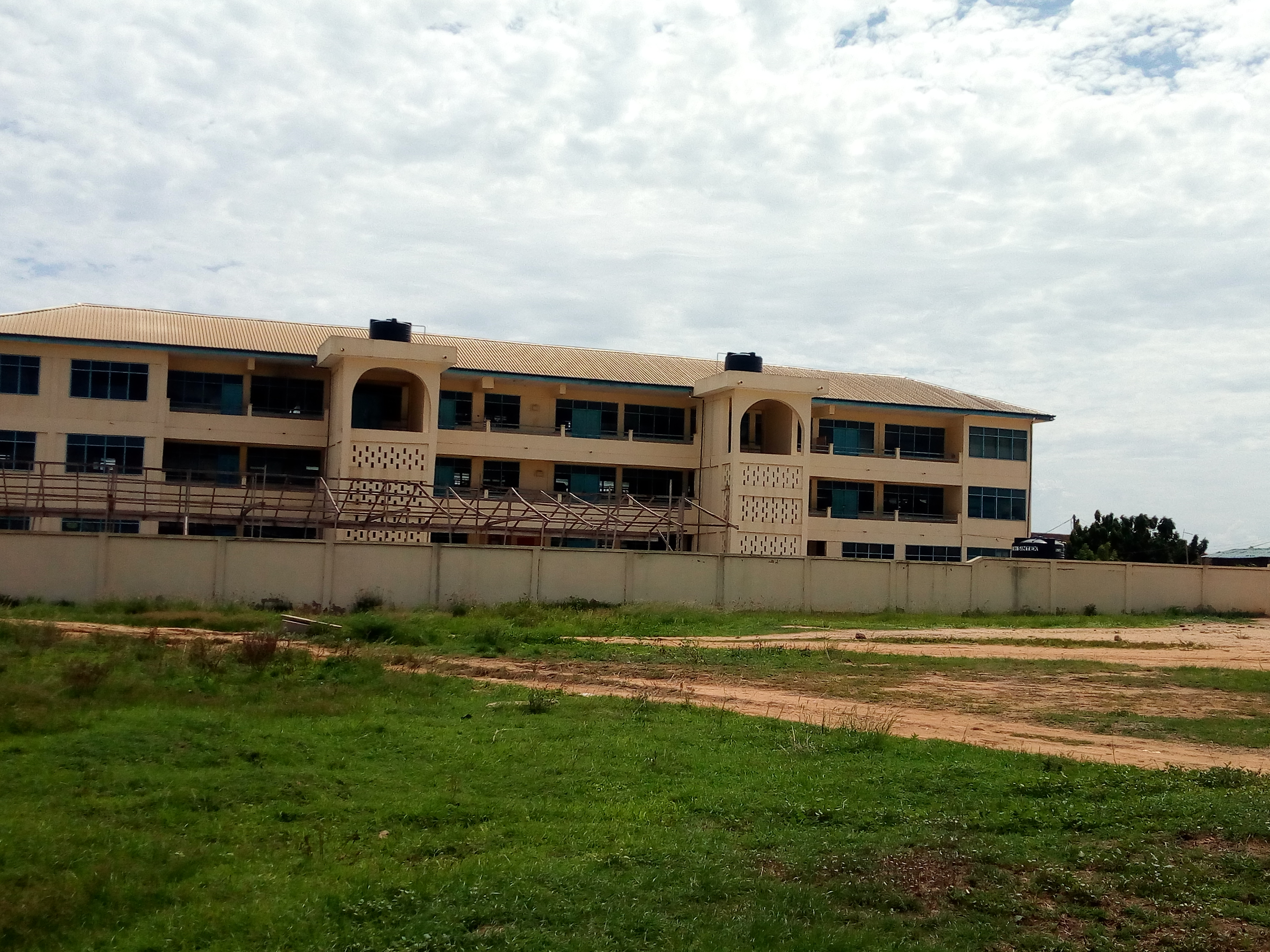
