= Chief Justice of Ghana =

Highest-ranking judge of the Supreme Court of Ghana

The chief justice of Ghana is the highest-ranking judge of the Supreme Court of Ghana. The chief justice is also the head of the Judiciary of Ghana and is responsible for its administration and supervision. In order of state precedence, the chief justice is the fourth highest official in Ghana.

== Historical background ==
The Supreme Court Ordinance of 1876 ended the 10-year absence of a Supreme Court, establishing a Supreme Court of Judicature for the Gold Coast Colony. The court consisted of the chief justice and not more than four puisne judges. This led to the appointment of the first chief justice, Sir David Patrick Chalmers by the British colonial authorities in 1876. The nature of the office of chief justice evolved with the years. The 1954 Gold Coast constitution provided for the chief justice to be appointed on the advice of the prime minister while other judges and judicial officers were appointed on the advice of the Judicial Service Commission. Under the 1957 Ghana constitution, on the attainment of independence, the chief justice and all superior justices were appointed on the advice of the prime minister as the Judicial Service Commission was abolished. Sir Kobina Arku Korsah became the first Ghanaian chief justice. Under the 1969 constitution, the chief justice was appointed by the president acting in consultation with the Council of State. The office has not changed much since the 1979 constitution though the court system underwent a lot of changes under various military governments between 1972 and 1993.

== Appointment and office tenure ==
The chief justice is appointed by the president of Ghana in consultation with the Council of State of Ghana and with the approval of the Parliament of Ghana. A person qualified to be the chief justice of Ghana must be of a high moral character and have proven integrity and must have been a lawyer for at least fifteen years to have been eligible for appointment to the Supreme Court in the first place. Where the office of the chief justice is vacant or the chief justice is incapacitated and unable to carry out his duties, the most senior of the justices of the Supreme Court is expected to act in his place until he is able to resume or a new substantive chief justice is appointed by the president. The chief justice and any other justice of the superior courts may voluntarily retire on reaching the age of 60 years or stay on till the compulsory retiring age of 70 years.

== Supreme Court and other superior courts ==
The Supreme Court consists of the chief justice and at least nine other judges. The chief justice is expected to preside at all sittings of the Supreme Court whenever present. The chief justice is the most senior member and oversees the administration of the Court of Appeal. The chief justice is also a member and administrator of the High Court and the Regional Tribunals.

== Judicial Council ==
The chief justice is the chairman of the Judicial Council of Ghana. The council is expected to propose judicial reforms to the Ghana government to help improve the level of administration of justice and efficiency in the Judiciary. It is also expected to be a forum to enhance the administration of justice in Ghana.

== Other duties ==
- Administer the presidential oath and the vice presidential oaths before parliament prior to both assuming their offices.
- Administer the oath of allegiance and the judicial oath to all justices of the superior courts or designate someone to act in his stead.
- Chairman of the Rules of Court Committee which makes rules regulating the practice and procedure of all courts in Ghana.
- To set up a tribunal to resolve grievances against the Electoral Commission of Ghana.
- Convene and chair a tribunal to oversee proceedings relating to the removal of the president of Ghana from office.
- Appoint judicial officers on the advice of the Judicial Council and subject to the approval of the president.

== Current chief justice ==
The current chief justice is in an acting capacity since April 2025. He is Paul Baffoe-Bonnie. He became acting chief justice following the suspension of Gertrude Torkornoo. He has subsequently been nominated in September 2025 as the next chief justice. She succeeded Kwasi Anin-Yeboah as the 15th chief justice of Ghana and the third female to hold this position in the history of Ghana. Torkornoo was sworn in as Chief Justice by President Akufo-Addo on 12 June 2023.

=== Suspension of Chief Justice Torkenoo ===
On 22 April 2025, following the receipt of three petitions for the removal of the Chief Justice, Gertrude Torkenoo, President John Mahama, in consultation with the Council of State suspended her from office as provided for by Article 146 of the 1992 constitution. A five member committee was set up to review the petition in line with constitutional provisions. In view of this, the most senior judge on the Supreme Court, Paul Baffoe-Bonnie will act as Chief Justice until resolution of the issue. The reviewing committee includes two Supreme Court Justices, Gabriel Pwamang, the next most senior judge after Baffoe-Bonnie and Samuel Adibu Asiedu. This generated controversy as the opposition cried foul-play while a government official reminded everyone that nothing had been proven against Torkenoo and that the constitutional provisions were being adhered to.

== Early chief justices (and judicial assessors) ==
- 1853–?1854 James Coleman Fitzpatrick
- 1854–1857 Henry Connor
- 1861–1866 William Hackett (acting 1861–1863)
- 1868 William Alexander Parker

== Chief justices of the Supreme Court ==
Since its inception in 1876, the Supreme Court has had 27 chief justices, including 13 in the Gold Coast era.

=== Chief justices of the Supreme Court of the Gold Coast ===
Chief Justice	Time frame	Period
Sir David Patrick Chalmers	1876 - 1878	Gold Coast
P. A. Smith	1878 - 1879	Gold Coast
Sir James Marshall	1880 - 1882	Gold Coast
N. Lessingham Bailey	1882 - 1886	Gold Coast
H. W Macleod	1886 - 1889	Gold Coast
Sir Joseph Turner Hutchinson	1889 - 1895	Gold Coast
Francis Smith (acting)	1895	Gold Coast
Sir William Brandford Griffith	1895 - 1911	Gold Coast
Sir Philip Crampton Smyly	1911 - 1928	Gold Coast
Sir George Campbell Deane	1929 - 1935	Gold Coast
Sir Philip Bertie Petrides	1936 - 1943	Gold Coast
Sir Walter Harragin	1943 - 1947	Gold Coast
Sir Mark Wilson	1948 - 1956	Gold Coast
Sir Kobina Arku Korsah	1956 - 5 March 1957	Gold Coast
=== Chief justices of Ghana ===
Chief Justice	Time frame	Period
Sir Kobina Arku Korsah	6 March 1957 - 1963	Ghana - 1st Republic
J. Sarkodee-Addo	1964 - 1966	Ghana - 1st Republic
Edward Akufo-Addo	1966 - 1969	military rule (1966–1969)
Edward Akufo-Addo	1969 - 1970	2nd Republic
Edmund Alexander Lanquaye Bannerman	1970 -1972	2nd Republic
Samuel Azu Crabbe	1973 - 1977	military rule
Fred Kwasi Apaloo	1977 - 1986	military rule (1977–1979)
Fred Kwasi Apaloo	1977 - 1986	3rd Republic (24 September 1979 - 31 December 1981)
Fred Kwasi Apaloo	1977 - 1986	^{[a]}military rule (31 December 1981 – 1986)
E. N. P. Sowah	1986 - 1990	military rule
N. Y. B. Adade (acting)	1990 - 1991	military rule
Philip Edward Archer	1991 - 1993	military rule (1991–1993)
Philip Edward Archer	1993 - 1995	4th Republic
Isaac Kobina Abban	1995 - 21 April 2001	4th Republic
Edward Kwame Wiredu	2001 - 2003	4th Republic
George Kingsley Acquah	4 July 2003 - 25 March 2007	4th Republic
Georgina Theodora Wood	15 June 2007 - 8 June 2017	4th Republic
Sophia Akuffo	19 June 2017 – 20 December 2019	4th Republic
Kwasi Anin-Yeboah	7 January 2020 – 24 May 2023	4th Republic
Gertrude Tokornoo	12 June 2023 – 1 September 2025	4th Republic
Paul Baffoe-Bonnie	13 November 2025 - date	4th Republic

Justice Francis Yaonasu Kpegah, who was at the time the most senior of the Supreme Court judges acted as Chief Justice between March 2007 and June 2007.

=== Demographics ===
Chief Justice of Ghana	Ethnicity	Religious affiliation
Kobina Arku Korsah	Fante (Akan)	Methodist
Julius Sarkodee-Addo	Akan	Christian
Edward Akufo-Addo	Akuapem (Akan)	Presbyterian
Edmund Alexander Lanquaye Bannerman	Ga	Methodist
Samuel Azu Crabbe	Ga	Anglican
Fred Kwasi Apaloo	Anlo Ewe	Christian
E. N. P. Sowah	Ga	Christian
Philip Edward Archer	Fante (Akan)	Anglican
Isaac Kobina Abban	Fante (Akan)	Methodist
Edward Kwame Wiredu	Akan	Anglican
George Kingsley Acquah	Fante (Akan)	Anglican
Georgina Theodora Wood	Ga	Assemblies of God (raised Methodist)
Sophia Akuffo	Akuapem (Akan)	Evangelical Charismatic (raised Presbyterian)
Kwasi Anin-Yeboah	Akan	Christian
Gertrude Torkornoo	Effutu (Guan)	Christian

== See also ==
- Judiciary of Ghana
- Supreme Court of Ghana
- List of judges of the Supreme Court of Ghana

== Notes ==
1. The Supreme Court was left intact under this military regime. See.

Order of precedence
Preceded by Speaker of the Parliament of Ghana	Chief Justice of Ghana
