= Julius Sarkodee-Addo =

Ghanaian lawyer (1908–1972)

Julius Sarkodee-Adoo JSC

2nd Chief Justice of Ghana
- In office 1964–1966
- Appointed by: Dr. Kwame Nkrumah
- Preceded by: Sir Kobina Arku Korsah
- Succeeded by: Edward Akufo-Addo

Personal details
- Born: 8 September 1908
- Died: January 1972 (aged 63) Accra, Ghana

Justice Julius Sarkodee-Adoo JSC (8 September 1908 – January 1972) was the second Chief Justice of Ghana during the First Republic.

He studied law at King's College London, was admitted to Inner Temple in 1928, and was called to the Bar in 1932. He replaced the first native Ghanaian chief justice, Sir Kobina Arku Korsah in 1964. He was removed after the coup d'état of 24 February 1966 by the military National Liberation Council government which was formed after the overthrow of Dr. Kwame Nkrumah.

Sarkodee-Adoo died in January 1972 at the Korle-Bu Teaching Hospital in Accra.

== See also ==
- Chief Justice of Ghana
- List of judges of the Supreme Court of Ghana
- Supreme Court of Ghana

Legal offices
Preceded by Sir Kobina Arku Korsah	Chief Justice of Ghana; 1964–1966	Succeeded by Edward Akufo-Addo
