= Samuel Date-Bah =

Academic and former Supreme Court judge in Ghana

Samuel Kofi Date-Bah JSC FGA

Supreme Court Judge
- In office 2003–2013
- Appointed by: John Kufuor

Personal details
- Born: 26 February 1943 (age 83)

Samuel Kofi Date-Bah JSC FGA (August 26, 1943) is a Ghanaian academic and a former Supreme Court Judge in Ghana and the Gambia.

== Early life and education ==
Justice Professor Samuel Date-Bah was born on February 26, 1943, in Ghana. He entered Achimota School, in 1956, where he completed in 1962. He was admitted to the Law Faculty of the University of Ghana, Legon, in 1963, and graduated with an LL.B (First Class Honours) in 1965 and a Barrister at Law (BL.) diploma in 1966. He proceeded immediately to the Yale Law School, United States, from where he obtained a Master of Laws (LL.M.) in 1967 and a Ph.D. in law in 1969 from the London School of Economics, University of London. He was called to the Ghana Bar in 1966.

== Career ==
=== Academia ===
From 1969 to 1984 he taught various courses in various academic institutions, including contract, tort, commercial law and public international law. Academic positions he held include: 1969 to 1981, lecturer, senior lecturer and then associate professor, Faculty of Law, University of Ghana; 1979-1980, associate professor of commercial law, University of Nairobi; 1980–84, professor and head of Department of Private Law, University of Calabar, Nigeria; He also held visiting academic positions at Lincoln College, Oxford University (1972), Yale Law School (1976) and at the University of Fribourg, Switzerland (1998).

=== Justice of the Supreme Court ===
He was also a justice of the Supreme Court of Ghana from 2008 to 2013. In the 1970s, he was a member of the Ghana Law Reform Commission and Between 1969 and 1979 he was a part-time legal practitioner in Accra. He has since 2000 been a fellow of the Ghana Academy of Arts and Sciences and since 1996 a member of the International Academy of Commercial and Consumer Law. He is currently the chairman, Ghana Law Reform Commission and chairman, Council of the University of Ghana, Legon. He is also the board chairman of the Data Protection Commission of Ghana.

== International engagements ==
Between 1984 and 2003 Date-Bah was the special adviser (legal) at the Commonwealth Secretariat, London, responsible for effective legal advisory and negotiating services to the developing member states of the Commonwealth. He played instrumental role as leader of a multidisciplinary Commonwealth Secretariat team which assisted the first independence Government of Namibia to negotiate a joint-venture agreement with De Beers that has been the bedrock of the Namibian economy since then; and several petroleum exploration agreements with international petroleum companies on behalf of the government.

In the 1970s, Representative of the Ghana Government to the United Nations Commission on International Trade Law. He was elected chairman of the commission in 1978.

Since 1966 he has been a member of the International Institute for the Unification of Private Law UNIDROIT, Rome, Working Group that produced the UNIDROIT Principles of International Commercial Contracts.

== See also ==
- List of judges of the Supreme Court of Ghana
- Judiciary of Ghana
- Supreme Court of Ghana
