= Benjamin Teiko Aryeetey =

Ghanaian judge

Justice Benjamin Teiko Aryeetey

Justice of the Supreme Court of Ghana
- In office 2009–2011
- Appointed by: John Atta Mills

Appeal Court Judge
- In office 1999–2009
- Nominated by: Jerry John Rawlings

High Court Judge
- In office 1989–1999
- President: Jerry John Rawlings

Personal details
- Born: 14 June 1941 (age 85) Ghana
- Education: Mfantsipim School; Winneba Training College; Achimota School; University of Ghana
- Profession: Judge

Benjamin Teiko Aryeetey was a Ghanaian academic and judge. He is a retired justice of the Supreme Court of Ghana. He spent a total of forty (40) years serving on the bench of the Judiciary of Ghana. He was also a lecturer at the Ghana School of Law.

== Early life and education ==
Aryeetey was born on June 14, 1941. He studied for his First Division Certificate in the West African School Certificate Examination at Mfantsipim School from 1956 to 1960. He proceeded to the Winneba Training College in 1960 where he obtained a Teacher's Certificate 'A' in 1962. In 1963, he entered Achimota School obtaining his General Certificate of Education Advance Level (GCE A-Level) in 1965. He received his Bachelor of Laws (LLB) degree in 1968 from the University of Ghana and his post-graduate degree in law from the same university.

== Career ==
Aryeetey began his career at the bench as a District Magistrate Grade II in April 1971. He was appointed a Justice of the High Court in 1989 and, a year later, served with the Ghana Armed Forces as a Judge Advocate. He was subsequently promoted as a Justice of the Court of Appeal in April 1999, and he served in that capacity until 2009 when he was appointed Justice of the Supreme Court of Ghana. While on the bench, he participated in a number of conferences and workshops, some of which include; African Programme on American Legal Institution and Jurisprudence in the United States, Operation Cross Roads and Commonwealth Magistrates, and Judges Association Workshop in The Gambia.

Justice Aryeetey also served on and chaired various boards and associations. He was a member of the Judges and Magistrates Association and also served as Chairman of Maranatha University College Board.

Aside from serving on the bench, Aryeetey worked in academia. He was a lecturer for the Career Magistrates Programme teaching Judicial Ethics and an examiner for the final year Practical Advocacy course at the Ghana School of Law.

== Appointment ==
Aryeetey was nominated by the then president of Ghana, John Evans Atta Mills in 2009. He was subsequently vetted on Monday, October 12, 2009 and approved by parliament on October 31, 2009. He was sworn into office by the then president on November 2, 2009.

== See also ==
- List of judges of the Supreme Court of Ghana
- Supreme Court of Ghana
