= Isaac K. Amuah =

Supreme Court Judge

Isaac Amuah

Supreme Court Judge
- In office 30 November 1995 – 19 August 1997
- Appointed by: Jerry John Rawlings

Personal details
- Born: Isaac Amuah; December 15, 1929
- Died: August 19, 1997 (aged 67)
- Education: Mfantsipim School; Fourah Bay College
- Profession: Judge

Isaac K. Amuah (1929-1997) was a Ghanaian judge. He was a justice of the Supreme Court of Ghana from 30 November 1995 to 19 August 1997.

== Early life and education ==
Amuah was born on 15 December 1929 in Accra. He had his early education at the Accra Government School and the Methodist Boys' School in Accra. He later proceeded to Mfantsipim School, Cape Coast where he had his secondary education and Fourah Bay College, Freetown, Sierra Leone where he had his tertiary education.

== Career ==
Amuah was called to the bar at Lincoln's Inn in 1959, and consequently practiced in a Ghanaian law firm with other Solicitors from 1959 to 1962. On 17 February 1962, he was appointed a District Magistrate in Kumasi. He later became a Circuit Court judge in Accra, where he was based in Jamestown. Amuah rose through the ranks to become an Appeal Court judge and subsequently a Supreme Court judge on 30 November 1995. He remained in this office until his death on 19 August 1997.

== Personal life ==
Amuah died in office on 19 August 1997. His hobbies included reading books.
