= Mark Wilson (judge) =

Irish-born British colonial administrator and judge

Sir Mark Wilson

12th Chief Justice of the Gold Coast
- In office 1948–1956
- Preceded by: Walter Harragin
- Succeeded by: Kobina Arku Korsah

Personal details
- Born: 22 October 1896 Castlecomer, Kilkenny
- Died: 10 April 1956 (aged 59) Accra, Ghana
- Education: Trinity College Dublin
- Profession: Judge

Military service
- Allegiance: United Kingdom
- Branch/service: Royal Air Force
- Years of service: 1918 - 1919

Sir Mark Wilson (22 October 1896 – 10 April 1956) was an Irish-born British colonial administrator and judge. He was Chief Justice of the Gold Coast from 1948 until his death in 1956.

== Early life and career ==
Wilson was born in Castlecomer, Kilkenny. He was educated at Kilkenny College, Mountjoy School, and Trinity College, Dublin (BA, LLB). His university education was interrupted by service with the Royal Air Force from 1918 to 1919. He was Auditor of the College Historical Society and captained Wanderers F.C.

He was called to the Irish Bar in 1924, before joining the Colonial Administrative Service in Tanganyika as a Cadet the same year. In 1926, he was transferred to Uganda as a District Magistrate, being promoted to Senior Magistrate in 1935. In 1936, he returned to Tanganyika as a puisne judge. In 1948, he was appointed as Chief Justice of the Gold Coast. He was knighted in the 1950 King's Birthday Honours List.

While Chief Justice of the Gold Coast, he presided over the Supreme Court sitting in January 1956 on allegations of misconduct against Emmanuel Obetsebi-Lamptey leading to the suspension of Obetsebi-Lamptey for two years.

== Family ==
Wilson married Dr Isabella Kilpatrick McNeilly in 1927; they had one son and two daughters.

== Death ==
Wilson died in Accra in 1956; he was succeeded as Chief Justice by Kobina Arku Korsah, the first African man to hold the post.
