= George Kingsley Acquah =

Ghanaian judge

George Kingsley Acquah MSG JSC

11th Chief Justice of Ghana (23rd including Gold Coast)
- In office 4 July 2003 – 25 March 2007
- Appointed by: John Kufuor
- Preceded by: Edward Kwame Wiredu
- Succeeded by: Georgina Theodora Wood

Supreme Court Judge
- In office 1995 – 25 March 2007
- Appointed by: Jerry Rawlings

Personal details
- Born: 4 March 1942 Sekondi, British Gold Coast (now Ghana)
- Died: 25 March 2007 (aged 65) Accra, Ghana
- Spouse: Mrs. Jane Acquah

George Kingsley Acquah MSG JSC (4 March 1942 – 25 March 2007) was the twenty-third Chief Justice of the Supreme Court of Ghana(the eleventh since independence). He was appointed as Chief Justice on 4 July 2003 and was the incumbent until his death.

== Early life and education ==
Justice Acquah was born on 4 March 1942 at Sekondi in the Western Region of the then-British Gold Coast to Isaac Yankson and Beatrice Acquah but was brought up by his stepfather, Isaac Charles Acquah. He had his basic education in a number of schools, namely Half Assini Methodist School, Cape Coast Methodist School, Ashanti Bekwai Methodist School, Akim Oda Methodist School, Nkawkaw Methodist School and Dunkwa-on-Offin Anglican School.

He attended Adisadel College at Cape Coast, from 1957 to 1963 for his secondary and sixth form (college) education. He pursued his undergraduate degree at the University of Ghana, Legon between 1964 and 1967 where he obtained a B.A (Hons) degree in philosophy. In 1970, he obtained the LL.B. (Hons) degree in law from the same university. He continued to the Ghana School of Law where he obtained his Professional Certificate in Law and was called to the Bar in 1972.

== Working life ==
Justice George Acquah was in private legal practice at Cape Coast from 1972 until 19 September 1989 when he became a High Court Judge, working at Ho in the Volta Region. He worked at the High Court until he rose to become an Appeal Court Judge in June 1994. In 1995, he was appointed as a Supreme Court Judge.

== Other roles ==
- Chairman, Budget Committee of the Judicial Service
- Chairman, Judicial Service Reform and Automation Committee
- Chairman, Board of Trustees of the Institute of Continuing Judicial Education of the Judicial Service of Ghana
- Chairman, Disciplinary Committee of the Judicial Council
- Chairman, Funeral Committee of the Judicial Service
- Chairman, Tender Board of the Judicial Service
- Member of the Judicial Council of Ghana
- Chairman, National Multi-Sectoral Committee on the Protection of the Rights of the Child
- Member, Rules of Court Committee
- Member, Appointments Committee of the Judicial Council
- Member, Africa Regional Council of the International Planned Parenthood Federation.
- Member of the Governing Council of the Ghana Legal Literacy and Resource Foundation
- Patron, Commonwealth Legal Education Association, London
- Honorary Legal Adviser of the International Planned Parenthood Federation;
- Editorial Advisor, Banking and Financial Law Journal of Ghana
- External Examiner (Law of Evidence) Ghana School of Law

== Honours ==
- June 2006 – Order of the Star of Ghana (Member)

== Personal life ==
Justice Acquah was married to Jane Acquah. Together, they had six children.

== Death ==
Justice Acquah died of cancer on 25 March 2007, aged 65, in Accra. He was married with six children.

== See also ==
- Chief Justice of Ghana
- Judiciary of Ghana
- Supreme Court of Ghana
- List of judges of the Supreme Court of Ghana

Legal offices
Preceded by Edward Kwame Wiredu	Chief Justice of Ghana; 2003–2007	Succeeded by Georgina Theodora Wood
