= Philip Bertie Petrides =

British colonial judge (1881–1956)

Sir Philip Bertie Petrides

10th Chief Justice of the Gold Coast
- In office 1936–1943
- Preceded by: Sir George Campbell Deane
- Succeeded by: Sir Walter Harragin

Chief Justice of the Supreme Court of Mauritius
- In office 1930–1935
- Preceded by: Thomas Ernest Roseby

Puisne Judge of the Supreme Court of Nigeria
- In office 1926–1930

Attorney General of Nyasaland
- In office 1924–1926

4th Chief Justice of Seychelles
- In office 1920–1924
- Preceded by: Sir Ewen Reginald Logan
- Succeeded by: Sir Justin Louis Devaux

Personal details
- Born: 27 June 1881 Sydenham, London, England
- Died: 19 April 1956 (aged 74) Tunbridge Wells
- Education: Dulwich College
- Occupation: Judge

Sir Philipos Bertie Petrides (27 June 1881 – 19 April 1956), known as Philip Petrides, was a British colonial judge and administrator.

== Biography ==
Petrides was born in Sydenham, London, the third son of Greek merchant Demetrius Nicetas Petrides (born in Symi, Ottoman Greece) and Ellen Bannerman of Hackney. He was educated in Dulwich and Brussels before being called to the bar at the Middle Temple in 1906.

After a decade practising at the Common Law Bar, Petrides was appointed Crown Prosecutor in the Seychelles, where he acted as Chief Justice in 1916–17 and 1918–19. He was Chief Justice of the Seychelles from 1920 to 1924 and Attorney–General of Nyasaland from 1924 to 1926. He served on the Supreme Court of Nigeria from 1926 to 1930, was Chief Justice of Mauritius from 1930 to 1936, and finally Chief Justice of the Gold Coast Colony from 1936 until 1944, when he retired and returned to England.

He was knighted in the 1936 New Year Honours.

== Personal life ==
In 1916, he married Clare Cosens, daughter of Mr. George Cosens. They had one son, Felix Bannerman Petrides, and one daughter, Pamela Rachel, who married Capt. Ernest Walter Davie Western.
