= P. A. Smith =

P. A. Smith was the Chief Justice of the Gold Coast Colony from 1878 until 1879. He was appointed in place of Sir David Patrick Chalmers and was succeeded by Sir James Marshall in 1880.
