= Edmund Alexander Lanquaye Bannerman =

Ghanaian judge (1915–1983)

Edmund Alexander Lanquaye Bannerman JSC

4th Chief Justice of Ghana
- In office 1970–1972
- Nominated by: Kofi Abrefa Busia
- Preceded by: Edward Akufo-Addo
- Succeeded by: Samuel Azu Crabbe

Personal details
- Born: 22 July 1915
- Died: 27 June 1983 (aged 67) Accra, Ghana

Edmund Alexander Lanquaye Bannerman JSC (22 July 1915 – 27 June 1983) was the Chief Justice of Ghana between 1970 and 1972. He was the fourth person to hold this position since Ghana became an independent nation in 1957. He was removed from office by the National Redemption Council, the military government in power after the coup of 13 January 1972 that ended the Second Republic of Ghana.

== Biography ==
Edmund Lanquaye Bannerman was born in Accra, Gold Coast (now Ghana), on 22 July 1915. His father, Emmanuel Edmund Bannerman, was an organist and choirmaster of the Wesley Methodist Church in Accra. Bannerman attended Mfantsipim School where he was Senior Prefect in 1933. He was educated at Selwyn College, University of Cambridge, England, and was called to the Bar at Lincoln's Inn, London, in 1939, after which he entered private practice in Ghana.

His later legal career encompassed being a senior lecturer at the Ghana School of Law (1960–64), a visiting lecturer at the University of Ghana (1961–63), a High Court judge in Tanzania (1964–67), legal adviser to Ghana Police and Ghana Airways (1967–70). He became a judge of the Supreme Court of Ghana in 1970, and was appointed Chief Justice of Ghana in 1971, after being acting Chief Justice (1970–71).

Bannerman died in Accra on 27 June 1983, at the age of 67.

== See also ==
- List of judges of the Supreme Court of Ghana
- Supreme Court of Ghana

Legal offices
Preceded by Edward Akufo-Addo	Chief Justice of Ghana; 1970–1972	Succeeded by Samuel Azu Crabbe
