= Fast Track High Court =

Superior court in Ghana

- Jurisdiction: Ghana
- Location: Accra, Ghana

The Fast Track High Court is one of the Senior Courts in Ghana

== Unconstitutionality ==
Ghana's Supreme Court declared the Fast Track Court unconstitutional following a suit brought against it by Mr. Tsatsu Tsikata. In a 5–4 decision, the Supreme Court has ruled the Fast Track Court, created by the NPP government, was illegal.

== Constitutionality ==
On 26 June 2002, the Supreme Court (SC) declared the Fast Track High Court constitutional.

== See also ==
- Judiciary of Ghana
- Supreme Court of Ghana
