= Koi Larbi =

Supreme Court Judge

Koi Obuadabang Larbi

Supreme Court Judge
- In office 5 August 1970 – 1972

Personal details
- Born: Koi Obuadabang Larbi; 1914
- Children: 1
- Education: Durham University
- Profession: Judge

Koi Obuadabang Larbi was an activist and Justice of the Supreme Court of Ghana from 1970 to 1972.

== Biography ==
Koi Larbi was born in 1914 in the Gold Coast. He obtained his law degree in 1943 from Durham University working at the West Indian seamen hostel as the warden. While in school, he was a member of the West African Students Union (WASU). He qualified as a barrister at the Middle Temple in January 1944 and begun private practice in London. He became a legal advisor to the Gold Coast Farmers' delegation in the United Kingdom in 1945, and the following year, he became a legal advisor to the West African National Secretariat (WANS). He was also a member African Progress Association and the chairman of the Committee for the Defence of People of African Descent, a committee that was formed to provide legal support to Black people.

Koi Larbi returned to the Gold Coast to resume private legal practice. He was called to the Gold Coast bar in 1946. In 1969 he was appointed member of the Council of State and a year later, he was appointed Justice of the Supreme Court of Ghana on 5 August. He was dismissed in 1972 when the Supreme Court was abolished by the National Redemption Council.

== See also ==
- List of judges of the Supreme Court of Ghana
- Supreme Court of Ghana
