= H. W. Macleod =

British puisne judge

Hector William Macleod was the Chief Justice of the Gold Coast Colony from 1886 until 1889.

Macleod was appointed a puisne judge of the Supreme Court of the Gold Coast Colony in 1880. He succeeded Sir N. Lessingham Bailey as Chief Justice in 1886 and was succeeded by Sir Joseph Turner Hutchinson in 1889.
