= George Campbell Deane =

Chief Justice of Gold Coast Colony

Sir George Campbell Deane was the Chief Justice of the Gold Coast Colony from 1929 until 1935. He took the office from Sir Philip Crampton Smyly in 1929 and was succeeded by Sir Philip Bertie Petrides in 1936.
