= David Patrick Chalmers =

Sir David Patrick Chalmers was a British colonial judge who served as the first Chief Justice of the Gold Coast from 1876 until 1878. He also had judiciary appointments in other British colonies like the Gambia Colony, British Guiana, Colony of Jamaica and Newfoundland colony.

== Early life and career ==
Chalmers was born in 1835. He was a student of the Edinburgh Institution and the University of Edinburgh. In 1860, he was called to the Scottish Bar and sworn in as Magistrate of Gambia in 1867, with full powers as Judge. He was appointed first Chief Justice of the Gold Coast in 1876 and was knighted the same year. He became Chief-Justice of British Guiana (now Guyana) in 1872.

He was the Royal Commissioner mandated to investigate the Sierra Leone revolt in 1898 which was a result of a hut tax repelled by the ruling chiefs because they were bypassed when the country's protectorate status was proclaimed in 1896 by the British. In 1893, He also served on a Judicial Commission of Enquiry in Jamaica. He also preceded over fraud cases in 1897 at Newfoundland.

== Death ==
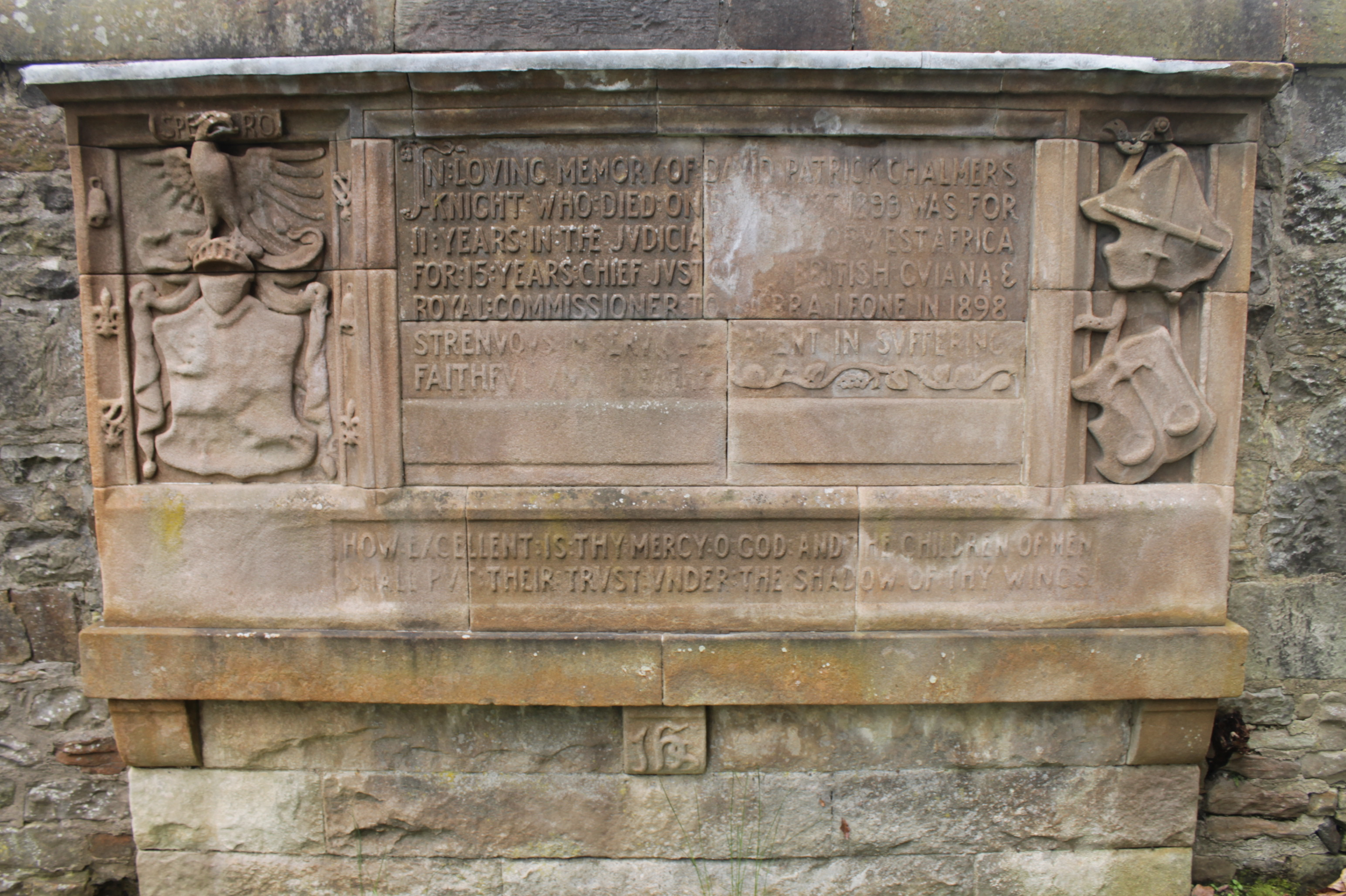
The grave of David Patrick Chalmers, Dean Cemetery

He died in Liberton south of Edinburgh on 5 August 1899. He is buried at the Dean Cemetery in west Edinburgh. The grave lies in the first north extension against the south wall.
