= N. Lessingham Bailey =

Newman Lessingham Bailey was the Chief Justice of the Gold Coast Colony from 1882 until 1886. He took the office after Sir James Marshall in 1882 and was succeeded by H. W. Macleod in 1886.
