= Georgina Theodora Wood =

Ghanaian judge and Chief Justice

Georgina Theodora Wood JSC OSG

12th Chief Justice of Ghana 24th Chief Justice of Gold Coast/Ghana
- In office 15 June 2007 – June 2017
- Appointed by: John Kufuor
- Preceded by: George Kingsley Acquah
- Succeeded by: Sophia Akuffo

Supreme Court Judge
- In office 12 November 2002 – June 2017
- Appointed by: John Kufuor

Member of the Council of State
- Incumbent
- Assumed office 21 June 2017
- Appointed by: Nana Akuffo-Addo

Personal details
- Born: Georgina Theodora Lutterodt; 8 June 1947 (age 79) Ghana
- Spouse: Edwin Wood
- Education: Wesley Girls' High School; University of Ghana; Ghana School of Law

Georgina Theodora Wood JSC OSG (née Lutterodt; born 8 June 1947) is a Ghanaian former judge and a former public prosecutor of the Ghana Police Service. She is the first female to serve in the office as Chief Justice of Ghana. She retired in 2017 after five decades of service to the state. She is a member of the Council of State.

== Early life and education ==
Georgina Lutterodt was born on 8 June 1947 in Ghana. She had her basic education at Bishop's Girls and Methodist Schools, Dodowa. She attended Mmofraturo Girls School, Kumasi between 1958 and 1960. Wood's secondary education was at Wesley Girls' High School, Cape Coast, which she completed in 1966. She proceeded to the University of Ghana, Legon, where she was awarded the LL.B. in 1970. Wood then attended the Ghana School of Law after which she was called to the bar. She also did a Post-Graduate Officers Training Course at the Ghana Police College.

== Career ==
Wood worked with the Ghana Police Service as a deputy superintendent and public prosecutor for three years. She later joined the Judicial Service and was appointed to the Bench as a District Magistrate in 1973. She rose through the Circuit and High Courts to become the presiding judge of the Appeal Court in 1991. She was appointed to the Supreme Court by President John Kufuor on 12 November 2002, accepting an appointment she had earlier declined.

=== Georgina Wood committee ===
The Georgina Wood committee was set up on 4 July 2006 to investigate the disappearance from a shipping vessel MV Benjamin of 77 packets of cocaine on 26 April 2006. It was also to investigate an alleged 200,000 dollars bribe paid to senior police officers by a woman linked to a Venezuelan drug baron, and also the 588 kg of cocaine seized at Mempeasem, East Legon from the Venezuelans.

=== Chief Justice of Ghana ===
She was nominated for the position of Chief Justice of Ghana in May 2007. On 1 June 2007, the Parliament of Ghana approved her nomination as the new Chief Justice of Ghana by consensus. As at June 2007, this made her the first woman in the history of Ghana to head the Judiciary and also made her at the time, the highest ranked female in Ghana's political history; that rank was surpassed by the appointment of Justice Joyce Adeline Bamford-Addo as Speaker of the 5th Parliament of Ghana's 4th Republic in January 2009. Chief Justice Wood assumed office on 15 June 2007. While in office, she swore-in four Presidents: the President John Evans Atta-Mills in January 2009, Vice-president John Dramani Mahama upon the death of Atta-Mills on 24 July 2012, President-Elect John Dramani Mahama, winner of the December 2012 General Elections on 7 January 2013, Nana Akuffo-Addo, winner of the December 2016 elections on 7 January 2017. She retired as Chief Justice in June 2017. She was succeeded by Justice Sophia Akuffo.

== Council of State ==
On 20 June 2017, Wood was sworn in by President Nana Akuffo-Addo as the 25th and final member of the Council of State. She is on the council by virtue of the fact that she is a former Chief Justice. It was the first time in 22 years that the vacancy had been filled as Ghana had had no living retired Chief Justice since 1995.

== Honors ==
On 7 July 2007, Wood was decorated with the Order of the Star of Ghana, the nation's highest honour. She was presented by President John Kufuor. In 2008, Wood was given an LLD (Honoris Causa) from the University of Ghana.

== Other roles ==
Wood is a choir leader at the Ringway Gospel Centre Assemblies of God Church, Accra. She is the Chairperson of the Alternative Dispute Resolution (ADR) in Ghana. She has also served as a member of the Kenya Judges and Magistrates Vetting Board. She serves on the board of the Global Justice Center, an international human rights law organization based in New York City.

== Family ==
Wood is married to Edwin Wood, a retired banker.

== Controversies ==
=== September 2008 NPP Land Allocation ===
On Thursday 7 October 2010, Wood was among 15 people named by the Committee for Joint Action as a beneficiary of allegedly illegal land allocation by the former NPP government. In an official statement, the committee claimed:

[...] the Chief Justice who should know the law, threw away any sense of integrity and decency and went for the land-grab. It is a travesty that this same person, the Chief Justice, is the one who is appointing judges to sit on cases to decide on whether the land-grab is lawful or not.

According to Accra urban redevelopment researcher Tom Gillespie:

According to official policy, plots would be openly advertised and allocated on the basis of competitive bids to ensure value for money for the public. In reality, however, there was a ‘land grab’. The public bidding process was disregarded and valuable plots were allocated to powerful government supporters at below-market prices. Due to fierce electoral competition between political parties in Ghana, governments often use resources to secure short-term political support rather than for long-term development.

== See also ==
- Chief Justice of Ghana
- First women lawyers around the world
- List of judges of the Supreme Court of Ghana
- Supreme Court of Ghana
- Judiciary of Ghana

Legal offices
Preceded by George Kingsley Acquah	Chief Justice of Ghana; 2007 – 2017	Succeeded by Sophia Akuffo
