= Supreme Court of Ghana =

Highest judicial body in Ghana

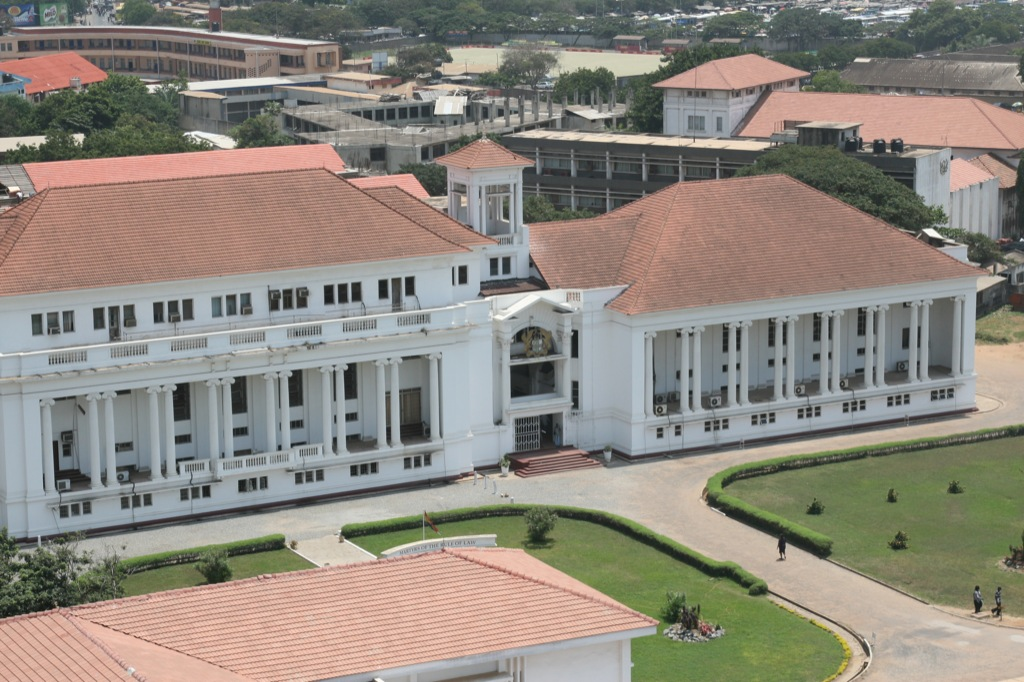
- Aerial view of the Supreme Court Buildings
- Interactive map of Supreme Court of Ghana
- 5°32′43.8072″N 0°12′17.3736″W
- Established: 1876; 150 years ago
- Location: Accra, Ghana
- Coordinates: 5°32′43.8072″N 0°12′17.3736″W
- Composition method: Presidential nomination, in consultation with the Council of State and with Parliamentary confirmation and approval
- Authorised by: Supreme Court Ordinance, 1876 and Constitution of Ghana, 1992
- Judge term length: Mandatory retirement at age 70
- Number of positions: A minimum of 9
- Website: The Judicial Service of Ghana

Chief Justice of Ghana
- Currently: Paul Baffoe-Bonnie
- Since: 17 November 2025

The Supreme Court of Ghana is the highest judicial body in Ghana. Ghana's 1992 constitution guarantees the independence and separation of the Judiciary from the legislative and the executive arms of government.

The Supreme Court of Ghana has the final say on legal matters and can overturn lower court decisions. The Court consists of nine justices and hears cases on a wide range of issues, including criminal law, civil law, and administrative law.

== History ==
The Supreme Court was established by the Supreme Court Ordinance (1876) as the highest tribunal in the Gold Coast (now Ghana) during the colonial era.

Until 1960, there was a right of appeal to the Judicial Committee of the Privy Council in London, England.

On 2 July 2013, the Supreme Court sentenced the editor of the Daily Searchlight newspaper, Ken Kuranchie, to 10 days in prison for calling the 9 Justices hypocritical and selective.

After the parliament of Ghana passed a bill allowing the cultivation of weed in the country in 2022, the Supreme Court in May 2023 struck out the cannabis cultivation bill by a 5-4 majority.

== Role and Jurisdiction ==
The Supreme Court of Ghana plays a critical role in the country's legal framework. Its jurisdiction extends to a wide range of matters, including:

- Constitutional interpretation: The Supreme Court has the authority to interpret the provisions of the Constitution of Ghana. This is a vital function as it ensures that the Constitution remains a living document that adapts to the changing needs of the nation.
- Presidential election petitions: In the event of disputes arising from presidential elections, the Supreme Court is vested with the power to adjudicate such matters and determine the validity of election results. One of the most notable cases was the 2012 presidential election petition, where the court upheld the election of President John Dramani Mahama. This case demonstrated the court's commitment to ensuring the integrity of Ghana's electoral process.
- Appellate jurisdiction: The Supreme Court serves as the highest appellate court in Ghana, hearing appeals from lower courts on a variety of legal issues.

== Current status ==
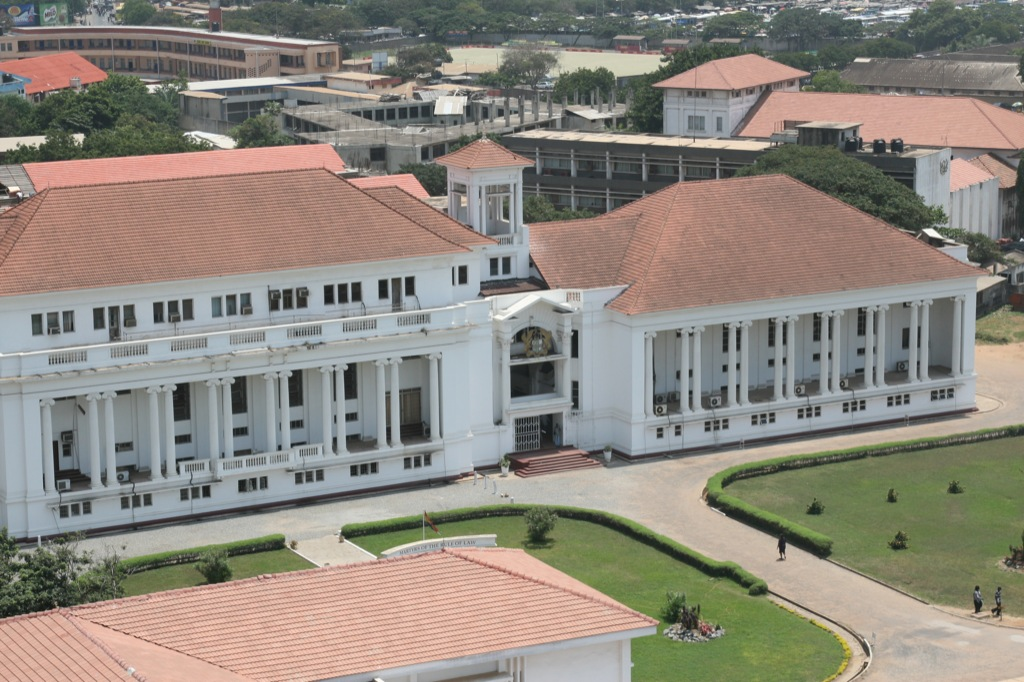
Aerial view of the Supreme Court building.

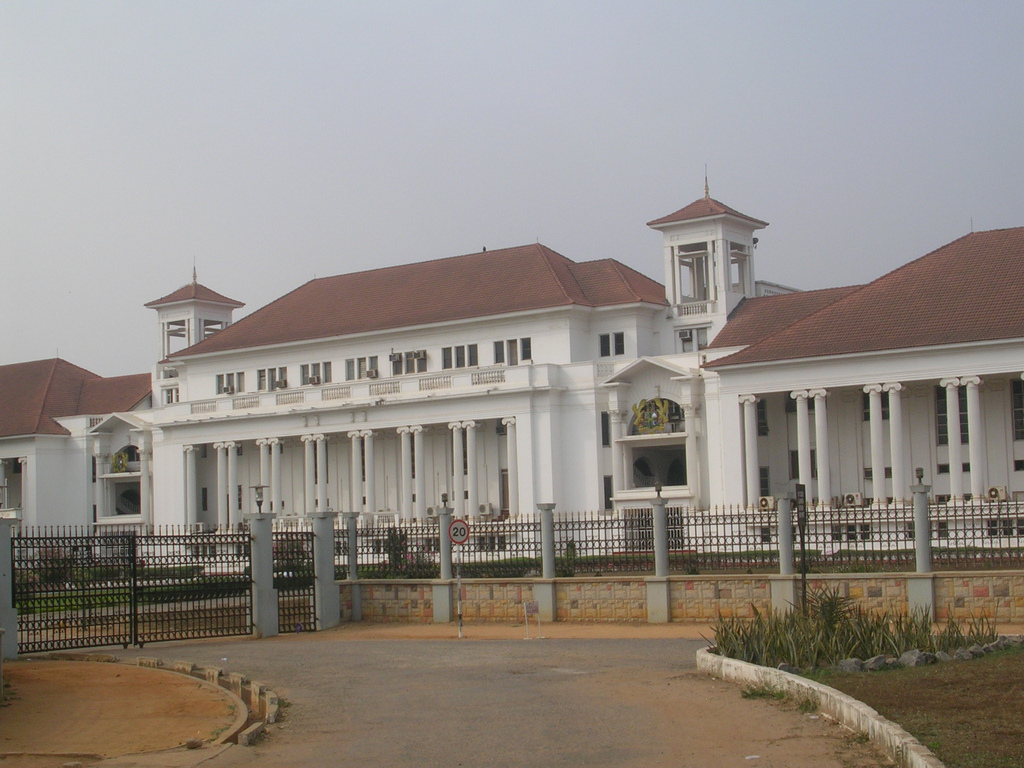
Front view of the Supreme Court building.

The 1992 constitution stipulates that the Supreme Court is made up of the Chief Justice of Ghana and not less than nine other Justices of the Supreme Court. Is the final court of appeal and has jurisdiction over matters relating to the enforcement or the interpretation of constitutional law. The Chief Justice is appointed by the President of Ghana acting in consultation with the Council of State and with the approval of the country's Parliament. The other Supreme Court Justices are appointed by the President acting on the advice of the Judicial Council and in consultation with the Council of State. This must also be with the approval of Parliament. The 1992 Constitution abolished all the public tribunals established under the Provisional National Defence Council and created the Regional Tribunal, whose chairman was equated with the High Court judges.

There is no limit on the number of judges appointed to the Supreme Court. There have been calls for there to be a cap on the number but various judges advised against it due to the demands on the court by the 1992 constitution. The Court of Appeal, which includes the chief justice and not fewer than five other judges, has jurisdiction to hear and to determine appeals from any judgment, decree, or High Court of Justice order. The High Court of Justice, which consists of the chief justice and not fewer than twelve other justices, has jurisdiction in all matters, civil and criminal, other than those involving treason.

The current Chief Justice of the Supreme Court of Ghana is Paul Baffoe-Bonnie, who was appointed following the suspension of Gertrude Torkornoo in April 2025.

== Justices of the Supreme Court ==
In July 2018, President Nana Akufo-Addo appointed four new judges to the Supreme Court: Samuel K. Marful-Sau and Agnes M.A Dordzie, both Justices of the Appeal Court, Nii Ashie Kotey, a former Dean of the Faculty of Law at the University of Ghana, and Nene A. O. Amegatcher, a lawyer in private practice who also a former president of the Ghana Bar Association. One of the longest-serving judges of the Court, William Atuguba, retired in the same month. He had been on the Supreme Court after being nominated by Jerry Rawlings in November 1995.

Sophia Akuffo was appointed Chief Justice by President Akufo-Addo from June 2017 to December 2019.

She was the last Supreme Court Judge appointed by Jerry Rawlings to retire. She retired on 20 December 2019 and was replaced by Kwasi Anin-Yeboah became the Chief Justice on 7 January 2020. He served from 2020 to 2023 and he was succeeded by

Gertrude Tokornoo who served from 2023 to 2025. President Mahama appointed Paul Baffoe Bonnie as Chief Justice from 2025 to date

In December 2019, President Akufo-Addo appointed three new judges to the Supreme Court: Mariama Owusu, Avril Lovelace-Johnson, and Gertrude Tokornoo. They replaced Vida Akoto-Bamfo, Sophia Adinyira, and Sophia Akuffo who had either retired or were due to retire.

On 3 July 2025, President Mahama swore in seven new judges to the Supreme Court in accordance with Article 144 of the 1992 Ghana constitution.

In August 2026, Mahama nominated three justices for the Supreme Court. They were Sophia Rosetta Bernasko-Essah, Appeal Court Judge, Edward Amoako Asante, Appeal Court Judge and former President of the ECOWAS Court of Justice and Anthony Forson, a private legal practitioner and former President of the Ghana Bar Association.

The following is a list of the judges of the Supreme Court.

List of Justices of the Supreme Court of Ghana
| Judge | Date Appointed | Length of service | Appointed by |
|---|---|---|---|
| Paul Baffoe-Bonnie | 11 June 2008 | 18 years, 3 months | John Kufuor |
| Gabriel Pwamang | 29 June 2015 | 11 years, 2 months | John Mahama |
| Avril Lovelace-Johnson | 17 December 2019 | 6 years, 9 months | Nana Akufo-Addo |
| Issifu Omoro Tanko Amadu | 22 May 2020 | 6 years, 4 months | Nana Akufo-Addo |
| Henrietta Mensa-Bonsu | 26 May 2020 | 6 years, 3 months | Nana Akufo-Addo |
| Yonny Kulendi | 26 May 2020 | 6 years, 3 months | Nana Akufo-Addo |
| Samuel Adibu Asiedu | 28 December 2022 | 3 years, 8 months | Nana Akufo-Addo |
| George Kingsley Koomson | 5 April 2023 | 3 years, 5 months | Nana Akufo-Addo |
| Ernest Gaewu | 5 April 2023 | 3 years, 5 months | Nana Akufo-Addo |
| Henry Anthony Kwofie | 3 January 2024 | 2 years, 8 months | Nana Akufo-Addo |
| Yaw Darko Asare | 3 January 2024 | 2 years, 8 months | Nana Akufo-Addo |
| Richard Adjei-Frimpong | 3 January 2024 | 2 years, 8 months | Nana Akufo-Addo |
| Senyo Dzamefe | 3 July 2025 | 1 year, 2 months | John Mahama |
| Dennis Dominic Adjei | 3 July 2025 | 1 year, 2 months | John Mahama |
| Gbiel Simon Suurbaareh | 3 July 2025 | 1 year, 2 months | John Mahama |
| Janapare Bartels-Kodwo | 3 July 2025 | 1 year, 2 months | John Mahama |
| Hafisata Amaleboba | 3 July 2025 | 1 year, 2 months | John Mahama |
| Kweku Tawiah Ackaah-Boafo | 3 July 2025 | 1 year, 2 months | John Mahama |

== List of chief justices of the Supreme Court ==
Since its inception in 1876, the Supreme Court has had 27 chief justices.

List of chief justices of the Gold Coast and Ghana
| Chief Justice | Time frame | Period |
|---|---|---|
| Sir David Patrick Chalmers | 1876–1878 | Gold Coast |
| P. A. Smith | 1878–1879 | Gold Coast |
| Sir James Marshall | 1880–1882 | Gold Coast |
| N. Lessingham Bailey | 1882–1886 | Gold Coast |
| H. W. Macleod | 1886–1889 | Gold Coast |
| Joseph Turner Hutchinson | 1889 - 1894 | Gold Coast |
| Francis Smith (acting) | 1894 - 1895 | Gold Coast |
| Sir William Brandford Griffith | 1895–1911 | Gold Coast |
| Philip Crampton Smyly | 1911–1928 | Gold Coast |
| Sir George Campbell Deane | 1929–1935 | Gold Coast |
| Sir Philip Bertie Petrides | 1936–1943 | Gold Coast |
| Sir Walter Harrangin | 1943–1947 | Gold Coast |
| Sir Mark Wilson | 1948–1956 | Gold Coast |
| Sir Kobina Arku Korsah | 1956–1963 | Gold Coast (1956 – 6 Mar 1957); Dominion of Ghana – 1st Republic (6 Mar 1957 – 1963) |
| J. Sarkodee-Addo | 1964–1966 | 1st Republic |
| Edward Akufo-Addo | 1966–1970 | Military rule (1966–1969); 2nd Republic (1969–1970) |
| Edmund Alexander Lanquaye Bannerman | 1970–1972 | 2nd Republic |
| Samuel Azu Crabbe | 1973–1977 | Military rule |
| Fred Kwasi Apaloo | 1977–1986 | Military rule (1977–1979); 3rd Republic (24 Sep 1979 – 31 Dec 1981); Military rule (31 Dec 1981–1986) |
| E. N. P. Sowah | 1986–1990 | Military rule |
| Nicholas Yaw Boafo Adade (acting) | 1990–1991 | Military rule |
| Philip Edward Archer | 1991–1995 | Military rule (1991–1993); 4th Republic (1993–1995) |
| Isaac Kobina Abban | 1995 – 21 April 2001 | 4th Republic |
| Edward Kwame Wiredu | 2001–2003 | 4th Republic |
| George Kingsley Acquah | 4 July 2003 – 25 March 2007 | 4th Republic |
| Georgina Theodora Wood | 15 June 2007 – 8 June 2017 | 4th Republic |
| Sophia Akuffo | 19 June 2017 – 20 December 2019 | 4th Republic |
| Kwasi Anin-Yeboah | 7 January 2020 – 24 May 2023 | 4th Republic |
| Gertrude Torkornoo | 6 June 2023 – 1 September 2025 | 4th Republic |
| Paul Baffoe-Bonnie | 17 November 2025 – | 4th Republic |

== Murders ==
On 30 June 1982, during the curfew hours, three High Court Judges and a retired Army Officer, Justice Frederick Poku Sarkodee, Justice Cecilia Koranteng-Addow, Justice Kwadwo Agyei Agyepong and Major (Rtd) Sam Acquah, were abducted from their homes and murdered at the Bundase Military Range in the Accra Plains. The victims' bodies were then doused in gasoline and set ablaze. The bodies were saved from total destruction by a light rain that put out the fire. The Ghanaian judicial system honours them each year on Martyrs' Day.

== Selected Landmark Decisions of the Supreme Court of Ghana ==
| Year | Name | Citation | Also known as | Subject Matter |
|---|---|---|---|---|
| 1961 | Re Akoto and 7 Others | [1961] GLR 523 | | Constitutionalism |
| 1963 | The State v. Otchere and Others | [1963] 2 GLR 463 | The Kulungugu Treason trial | |
| 1970 | Sallah v. Attorney-General | [1970] SCGLR 55 | The Sallah Case | Constitutional law, Natural justice |
| 1980 | Tuffour v. Attorney-General | [1980] GLR 637 | | Constitutional law, Standing (law) |
| 1992 | New Patriotic Party v. Attorney-General | [1992] SCGLR 35 | 31 December Case | Constitutional law, Judicial review |
| 1993–1994 | New Patriotic Party v GBC | [1993–94] 2 GLR 354 | | |
| 2013 | Akufo-addo and Others Vrs Mahama and Another | [2013] GHASC 137 | 2012 Election petition | |

== Critical assessment ==
=== Controversies ===
Former President John Dramani Mahama in September 2022 criticized the Registrar of the Supreme Court for not setting a date to hear an application seeking an interlocutory injunction. This application aims to halt the Electoral Commission's limited voter registration until a final decision is made on a lawsuit challenging the choice of venues for the exercise.

==== Halt of Speaker Ruling 2024 ====
On 17 October 2024, the Speaker of the Ghana Parliament, Alban Sumana Kingsford Bagbin, declared four parliamentary seats vacant after the incumbents defected to contest the 2024 parliamentary elections under different political parties. This decision sparked tensions, leading to a rowdy parliamentary session on 22 October, 2024, where some lawmakers walked out of the chamber. Following consultations with parliamentary leadership, Bagbin exercised his discretionary powers to suspend the house indefinitely under Standing Order 59(1), citing the ongoing crisis.

On 18 October 2024, the Supreme Court temporarily halted the enforcement of Bagbin’s ruling, allowing the affected MPs to retain their seats for the time being.

On 12 November 2024, the Supreme Court ruled against the decision of the speaker to declare four seats vacant, on the grounds that it was unconstitutional.

== See also ==
- 1982 Murders of Ghanaian Judges and Retired Army Officer
- Judiciary of Ghana
- List of justices of the Supreme Court of Ghana
- Chief Justice of Ghana
- General Legal Council
- Ghana School of Law
