= 2026 in Ghana =

- Decades: 2000s; 2010s; 2020s
- See also: Other events of 2026; Timeline of Ghanaian history

Events in the year 2026 in Ghana.

== Incumbents ==
- President – John Mahama
- Vice President – Jane Naana Opoku-Agyemang
- Speaker of Parliament – Alban Bagbin
- Chief Justice – Paul Baffoe-Bonnie

== Events ==
=== January ===
- 7 January – Former Finance Minister Ken Ofori-Atta, who is wanted on charges of corruption, is detained by immigration agents in the United States.

=== February ===
- 2 February – Ghana suspends its citizenship application process for people of African descent, citing the need to make the system more accessible and user-friendly.
- 4 February – Ghana and Zambia agree to abolish visa requirements for each other’s citizens.
- 10 February – The government designates Wednesdays as "Fugu Day", as part of efforts to promote indigenous fashion.
- 23 February – Kotoka International Airport is renamed as Accra International Airport.
- 25 February – Seventy-one fishermen are rescued following attacks by maritime gunmen off the coast of Awutu Senya West, Central Region.

=== March ===
- 6 March – The Ghanaian headquarters of a United Nations Interim Force in Lebanon (UNIFIL) in Lebanon is hit by missile attacks, leaving two soldiers critically injured. The Ministry for Foreign Affairs lodges a protest at the United Nations headquarters in New York following the incident.
- 25 March – The United Nations General Assembly adopts a Ghana-led resolution recognising the Atlantic slave trade as the “gravest crime against humanity”; the measure passes with 123 votes in favour.

=== April ===
- 12 April – A bus carrying football players of Berekum Chelsea F.C. is attacked by robbers along the Goaso–Bibiani road, leaving athlete Dominic Frimpong dead.
- 14 April – The Ghana Immigration Service announces the rescue of 305 West African nationals, including 113 minors, following an operation against street begging networks.

=== May ===
- 1 May:
  - China lifts tariffs on imports from Ghana until 2028.
  - Ghana exits a proposed health deal with the United States due to concerns over data privacy.
- 13 May – MP Kwame Ohene Frimpong is detained in the Netherlands amid an investigation into financial crimes by the United States.
- 15 May – Ghana officially leaves the Extended Credit Facility (ECF) programme with the International Monetary Fund.
- 29 May – Parliament approves the Human Sexual Rights and Family Values Bill, 2025, which criminalizes the promotion, funding, and sponsorship of LGBTQ activities, and introduces a duty to report prohibited LGBTQ acts.

=== June ===
- 2 June – A bus and a truck collide in Volta Region, killing 15 people and injuring 25.
- 30 June
  - A coalition of advocacy groups file a complaint against ECOWAS, on behalf of 27 people deported from the United States under the Trump administration's third-country deportation programme.
  - At least 24 people are killed in floods and landslides caused by torrential rain in Accra and Ivory Coast.

=== July ===
- 3 July – The Ghanaian national football team are eliminated from the 2026 FIFA World Cup after losing 1–0 to Colombia in the round of 32 in Kansas City, with Jhon Arias scoring the only goal.
- 7 July – The government postpones the planned August 2026 session of the Ghana–South Africa Bi-National Commission, citing an apparent surge in violence against illegal migrants in South Africa.
- 29 July – A nationwide power outage strikes after a major fault on the national electricity grid forces several power plants to shut down.

=== August ===
- 3 August – A multi-vehicle crash at Birimso Bridge on the Accra–Kumasi Highway kills at least 15 people.
- 13 August – Twelve people are killed and 13 others are injured in a multivehicle collision on the Accra–Kumasi Expressway.

=== September ===
- 2 September – Two minivans collide in the Greater Accra region, killing 13 people and injuring five others.

== Holidays ==
- 1 January – New Year's Day
- 9 January – Constitution Day
- 6 March – Independence Day
- 30 March – Eid al-Fitr
- 18 April – Good Friday
- 21 April – Easter Monday
- 1 May – May Day
- 6 June – Eid al-Adha
- 4 July – Republic Day
- 4 August – Founders' Day
- 21 September – Kwame Nkrumah Memorial Day
- 5 December – Farmers' Day
- 25 December – Christmas Day
- 26 December – Boxing Day

== Deaths ==
- 4 January – Naser Toure Mahama, 60, MP (since 2012).
- 7 February – Ebo Taylor, 90, musician.
- 15 February – Peter Tasiri, 95, revolutionary and politician, member of the Armed Forces Revolutionary Council (1979).
- 12 April – Dominic Frimpong, 20, footballer (Berekum Chelsea).
- 24 May – Beverly Afaglo, 42, actress (The Game, A Northern Affair, Sidechic Gang) and television presenter.
- 12 July – Gariba II, 87, traditional ruler.
- 27 July – Sulemana Abdul Samed, 32, tallest man in Ghana.
- 14 October – Gamal Nkrumah, 68, journalist (Al-Ahram Weekly).
- 8 November – Alberta Ampomah, 32, Olympic weightlifter (2012).
- 14 November – Joshua Tijani, 34, footballer (Wa All Stars, Ashanti Gold, national team).
