= 2027 in Ghana =

- Decades: 2000s; 2010s; 2020s
- See also: Other events of 2027; Timeline of Ghanaian history

Events in the year 2027 in Ghana.

== Incumbents ==
- President – John Mahama
- Vice President – Jane Naana Opoku-Agyemang
- Speaker of Parliament – Alban Bagbin
- Chief Justice – Paul Baffoe-Bonnie

== Events ==
=== Predicted and scheduled ===
- 14 March – 3 April – 2027 U-20 Africa Cup of Nations

== Holidays ==
- 1 January – New Year's Day
- 7 January – Constitution Day
- 6 March – Independence Day
- 9 March – Eid al-Fitr
- 26 March – Good Friday
- 29 March – Easter Monday
- 1 May – May Day
- 16 May – Eid al-Adha
- 4 July – Republic Day
- 21 September
  - Founders' Day
  - Kwame Nkrumah Memorial Day
- 3 December – Farmers' Day
- 25 December – Christmas Day
- 26 December – Boxing Day
