= 2025 in Ghana =

- Decades: 2000s; 2010s; 2020s
- See also: Other events of 2025; Timeline of Ghanaian history

Events in the year 2025 in Ghana.

== Incumbents ==
- President – Nana Akufo-Addo (until 7 January); John Mahama (since 7 January)
- Vice President – Mahamudu Bawumia (until 7 January); Jane Naana Opoku-Agyemang (since 7 January)
- Speaker of Parliament – Alban Bagbin
- Chief Justice – Gertrude Torkornoo (until 1 September); Paul Baffoe-Bonnie (since 1 September)

== Events ==
=== January ===
- 7 January – Former president John Mahama is inaugurated again as president.
- 18 January – At least seven people are shot dead by soldiers in disputed circumstances at the Obuasi Gold Mine in Ashanti Region.

=== February ===
- 16 February – At least 51 people are reported to have died while 6,100 cases are reported following an outbreak of cholera that affects Greater Accra, Central, Western, Eastern and Ashanti Regions.

=== March ===
- 4 March – MPs reintroduce a controversial anti-LGBT bill, with a three-year jail term for identifying as gay and 5-10 years for promoting LGBT rights.
- 27 March – A fishing vessel with a crew that includes three Chinese nationals is briefly hijacked by suspected pirates off the Ghanaian coast.

=== April ===
- 17 April – A bus overturns in Central Gonja District, killing 10 people.
- 22 April –
  - President Mahama orders the suspension of Chief Justice Gertrude Torkornoo, citing possible misconduct.
  - A fuel tanker and a bus collide near Amanase, killing 11 people.

=== May ===
- 26 May – The Embassy of Ghana, Washington, D.C. is closed by the Ghanaian government as part of an investigation into visa fraud and unauthorised payments.

=== July ===
- 8 July – President Mahama establishes the GOLDBOD Task Force as part of efforts to combat illegal gold mining and smuggling.
- 28 July – A vehicle and a fuel tanker collide in Kumasi, killing 15 people.

=== August ===
- 6 August – 2025 Ghanaian Air Force Z-9 helicopter crash: A Harbin Z-9 helicopter of the Ghana Air Force crashes in Ashanti Region, killing all eight people on board including defence minister Edward Omane Boamah and environment minister Ibrahim Murtala Muhammed.
- 19 August – President Mahama issues a mass pardon and commutations to 998 inmates.
- 24 August – Communal clashes break out in Gbiniyiri in Savannah Region due to a land dispute, killing at least 31 people and displacing 50,000 others, with 13,000 fleeing to Ivory Coast.

=== September ===
- 1 September – President Mahama orders the dismissal of suspended Chief Justice Gertrude Torkornoo for misconduct.

=== October ===
- 12 October – Ghana qualifies for the 2026 FIFA World Cup after defeating Comoros 1-0 at the 2026 FIFA World Cup qualification in Accra.
- 14 October – Democracy Hub, the rights group led by Oliver Barker-Vormawor, sues the Ghanaian government over its acceptance of U.S. deportees, calling the agreement unconstitutional and in breach of international law.
- 22 October – Police in Accra rescue 57 trafficked Nigerians and arrest five suspects in a human trafficking and cybercrime raid.

=== November ===
- 12 November – Six people are killed in a crowd crush at a recruitment drive of the Ghana Armed Forces in El Wak Stadium in Accra.

=== December ===
- 10 December – Highlife is recognized as intangible cultural heritage by UNESCO.
- 11 December – The government bans mining in forest reserves in an attempt to restrict environmental degradation and reverse the 2022 regulations that had allowed controlled mining.

== Sports ==
- 2024–25 Ghana Premier League
- 2025 Africa Cup of Nations qualification Group F

== Holidays ==
- 1 January – New Year's Day
- 7 January – Constitution Day
- 6 March – Independence Day
- 30 March – Eid al-Fitr
- 18 April – Good Friday
- 21 April – Easter Monday
- 1 May – May Day
- 6 June – Eid al-Adha
- 4 July – Republic Day
- 4 August – Founders' Day
- 21 September – Kwame Nkrumah Memorial Day
- 5 December – Farmers' Day
- 25 December – Christmas Day
- 26 December – Boxing Day

== Deaths ==
- 7 July – Ernest Kumi, 40, MP (since 2025).
- 26 July – Daddy Lumba, 60, singer-songwriter and musician.
- 6 August – (2025 Ghanaian Air Force Harbin Z-9 crash)
  - Ibrahim Murtala Muhammed, 50, minister for environment, science, technology and innovation (since 2025) and MP (since 2021)
  - Edward Omane Boamah, 51, minister for communications (2013–2017) and defence (since 2025)
  - Samuel Sarpong, 67, Ashanti regional minister
  - Limuna Mohammed Muniru, 57, Northern regional minister
- 22 September – Cecilia Johnson, 79, chair of the Council of State (2013–2017)
- 23 October – Nana Konadu Agyeman Rawlings, 77, first lady (1979, 1981–2001)

== See also ==
- African Continental Free Trade Area
