= Fugu Day (Ghana) =

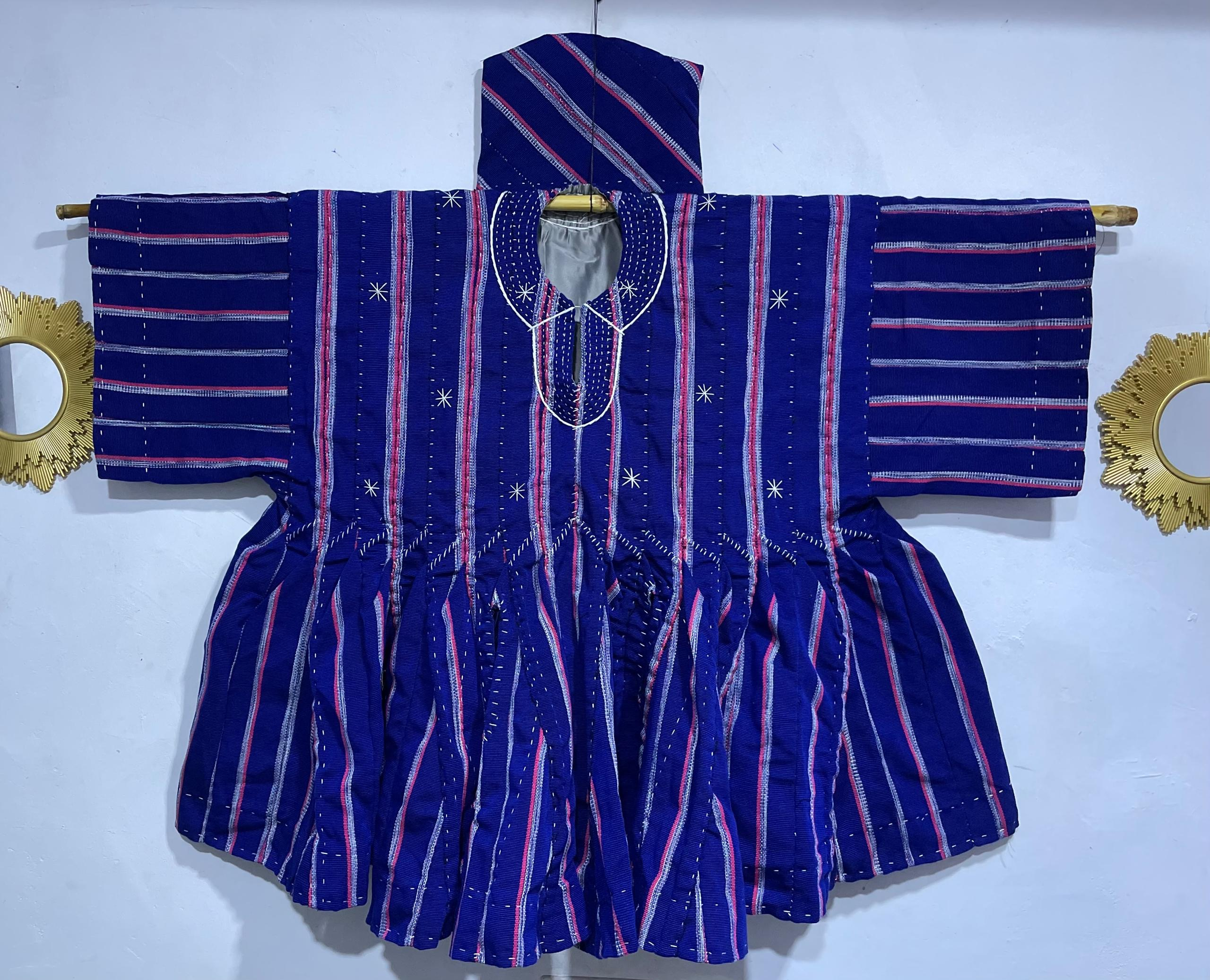
A traditional smock and matching cap

Fugu Day is a weekly cultural observance in Ghana where individuals are encouraged to wear the fugu or batakari, also known as the batakari or Ghanaian smock, a handwoven garment mainly linked to northern Ghana. In February 2026, Ghana's government designated Wednesdays for this practice to safeguard Ghana's cultural heritage and build national pride. It is also hoped that the initiative will boost local textile production and the garment sector.

== Background and origins ==
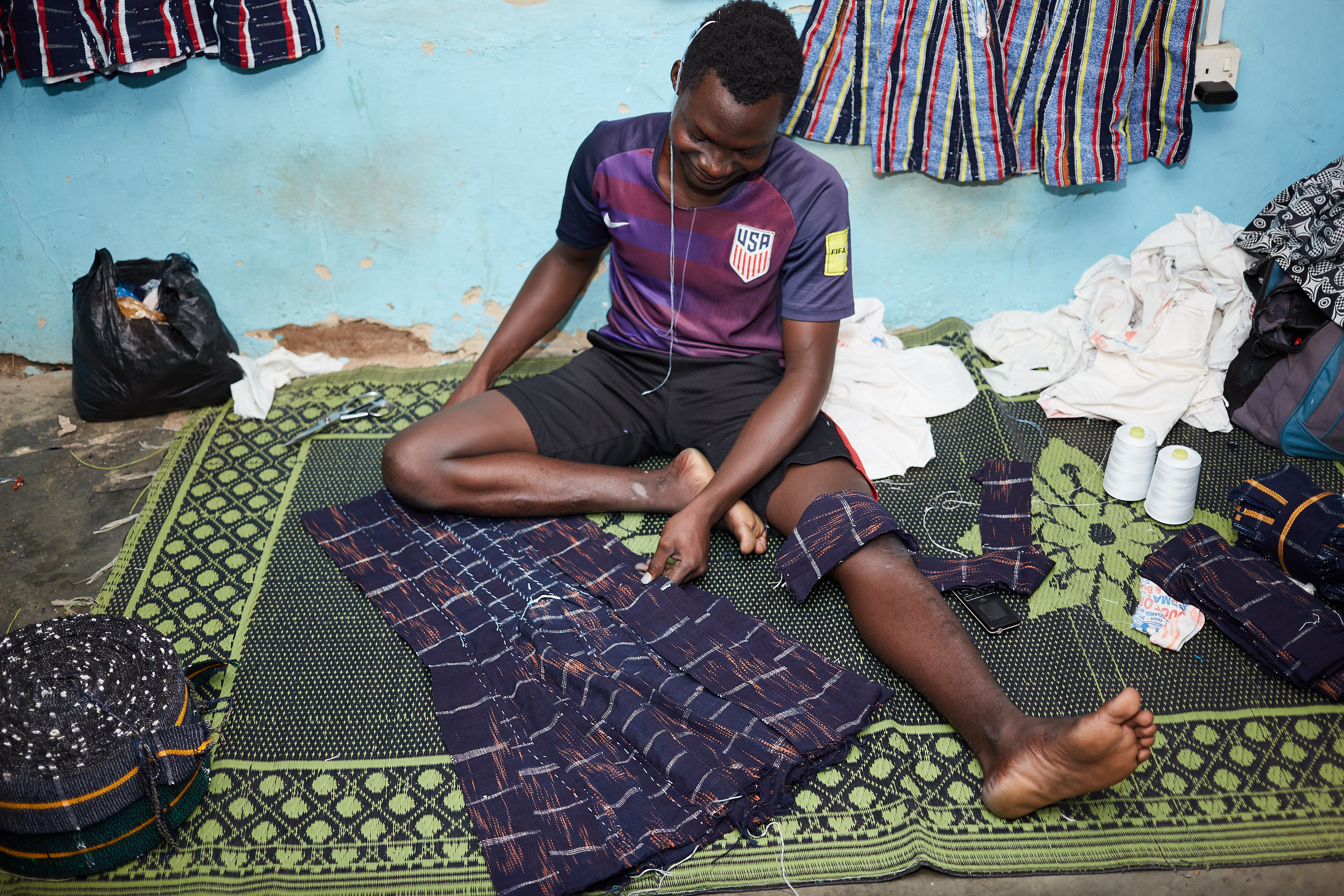
Sewing of strips to form a smock.

In Ghana's northern territories, the smock (locally known as Batakari among the Akan, and Fugu among the Dagomba, Mamprusi, and other northern groups) is handwoven from thick cotton and stitched into a tunic-like form in accordance with long tradition. Northern Ghanians value the garment highly and consider it a statement of dignity and authenticity which represents the soul of northern craftsmanship and Ghanaian heritage. Many regard it as an emblem of identity, resilience, and unity.

The fugu consists of narrow strips of thick cotton fabric, sewn together into a loose-fitting poncho-style garment, often featuring bright colours. According to oral traditions among the Dagomba people of Dagbon, it was introduced in the 1600s during the reign of Yaa Naa Zanjina, predating the modern suit in the region. Ghana's first president, Kwame Nkrumah, wore the garment during independence celebrations on 6 March 1957. In early February 2026, President John Dramani Mahama appeared in fugu during a visit to Zambia. Some Zambians mocked its appearance online, comparing it to a blouse.

Ghana's Tourism Minister Abla Dzifa Gomashie said on Tuesday that wearing the outfit every week would help project the country's identity "with pride on the global stage". She encouraged wearing the outfit "in all its diverse forms, designs, and expressions, complemented by its distinctive and beautiful accessories". Beyond its cultural importance, Gomashie said the outfit's weekly display would "generate far-reaching social and economic benefits" especially for local weavers, designers, artisans and traders. On February 10, 2026 the Ministry of Tourism, Culture and Creative released a press statement to declare every Wednesday as FuguDay. This is a collective commitment to preserve, promote and celebrate Ghana's rich heritage. Ghanaians countered with social media posts under #FuguDay.
