= Public holidays in Ghana =

There are approximately thirteen nationally recognized public holidays in Ghana, a sub-Saharan country in Africa. The primary National holiday is Independence Day, which is on 6 March. It is a National Day and is set to honor the memory of Ghana's independence from the United Kingdom in 1957.

This is a list of public holidays in Ghana.

== National holidays ==
| Date | English name | Description |
|---|---|---|
| 1 January | New Year's Day | |
| 7 January | Constitution Day | Constitution of 1992 and Fourth Republic 1993. |
| 6 March | Independence Day | Dominion of Ghana established within the Commonwealth of Nations in 1957. |
| Friday before Easter | Good Friday | Crucifixion of Jesus |
| Monday after Easter | Easter Monday | |
| 1 May | May Day | Workers' Day |
| 1 Shawwal | Eid al-Fitr | Festival of Breaking the Fast |
| 10 Dhu al-Hijjah | Eid al-Adha | Feast of the Sacrifice |
| 1 July | Republic Day | It commemorates the establishment of the Republic of Ghana in 1960 when the nation transitioned from a constitutional monarchy to a republic. |
| 21 September | Founders' Day | Birthday of Nkrumah, first prime minister (1957-1960) and first president (1960-1966) of Ghana |
| First Friday in December | Farmers' Day | Recognizes farmers and fishermen. |
| 25 December | Christmas Day | Birth of Jesus |
| 26 December | Boxing Day | |

== Notes ==
1. Introduced by the Ministry of Food and Agriculture, National Farmers' Day was organized as a day’s activity for the nation to honor its hard working farmers, with certificates and prizes, who excelled in their contributions to improve the agricultural sector. In 1988, the first Friday of every December was designated by the government as Farmers' Day and is celebrated as a statutory Public Holiday.
2. With the exception of Farmers' Day which is always on a Friday, when these dates fall at the weekend, the following Monday tends to be declared a holiday.
3. Kwame Nkrumah Memorial Day is celebrated in commemoration of the birthday of Dr. Kwame Nkrumah, the first President of Ghana.
4. Constitution Day is a relatively newly designated Public Holiday, which was initially observed on 7 January 2019.

It is not mandatory that all Ghanaian institutions/organizations recognize public holidays. Institutions/organizations that are exempt include The Ghana National Fire Service, food vendors, some category of hotels, health service providers such as hospitals, dealers in pharmaceutical products etc.
