= Quartey =

Quartey is a surname of Ga origin.

Notable people with the surname include:

== Sportspeople ==
- Clement Quartey, Ghanaian former boxer
- Ebenezer Quartey, Ghanaian track athlete
- Ike Quartey, former WBA welterweight champion boxer
- Jonathan Quartey, multiple Ghanaian football players
- Laud Quartey, Ghanaian football player
- Harold Jones-Quartey, Ghanaian-American NFL football player

== Others ==
- Benjamin Quartey-Papafio, a physician and politician in the Gold Coast
- Ekow Quartey, British actor
- Ian Jones-Quartey, American animator and graphic artist of Ghanaian descent
- Yolanda Quartey, best known as Yola (singer), English singer-songwriter
- I. B. Quartey, army general
- Kwei Quartey, novelist
