= Kojo Boakye-Djan =

Ghanaian military officer and politician

Member of the Armed Forces Revolutionary Council
- In office 4 June 1979 – 24 September 1979
- President: Flt. Lt. Jerry Rawlings

Personal details
- Died: 30 August 2023
- Resting place: Military Cemetery, Burma Camp, Accra
- Education: Achimota School
- Profession: Soldier

Military service
- Allegiance: Ghana Armed Forces
- Branch/service: Ghana Army
- Rank: Major
- Unit: Fifth Infantry Battalion

Major Kojo Boakye-Djan (or Kwadwo Boakye Djan) was a Ghanaian military officer and coup plotter. He is known to have planned the coup that brought Flight Lieutenant Jerry John Rawlings to power in Ghana on 4 June 1979 with other junior officers.

== Early life and education ==
Boakye-Djan is the 19th of 56 siblings. He attended Secondary school at Opoku Ware School for his O Levels his sixth form at the Achimota School. He was also the best man at the wedding of Rawlings and Nana Konadu Agyeman Rawlings. He went on to study English Literature, Linguistics and Sociology at the University of Ghana.

== Journalism ==
Boakye-Djan worked with the Ghanaian Times as a journalist.Category:University of Ghana alumni. He later became a lecturer at the Ghana Institute of Journalism. Following this, he worked with the Daily Graphic.

== Military career ==
He was with the Fifth Infantry Battalion prior to the 4 June 1979 coup d'état which replaced the Supreme Military Council government with the Armed Forces Revolutionary Council.

== Politics ==
Boakye-Djan formed the Free Africa Movement with some colleagues in the early 1970s and they were planning to take power in the 1980s as senior officers in the army. Their planning was still at an early stage and the 15 May 1979 abortive coup attempt by Flight Lieutenant Rawlings forced them into initiating theirs as some of them were being arrested on suspicion of plotting against the military government. It appears it was one of his members, Peter Tasiri who actually initiated the coup on the day. There appeared to be a lot of confusion and no clear leadership during the coup events. In 2003 he said that the main purpose was to save Rawlings, who was facing a possible death sentence for planning a coup in the previous month. During an interview in 2017, he stated that he and Rawlings had grown apart and had not spoken to each other since the end of the AFRC rule.

== Post AFRC ==
Boakye-Djan went to the United Kingdom under a UNDP Fellowship for postgraduate studies. This was at a time when the Limann government sent most former members of the AFRC abroad. He was also affiliated with the National Democratic Congress.

== Death and burial ==
Boakye-Djan died on 30 August 2023 and was buried on 27 January 2024 at the Military Cemetery, Burma Camp, Accra.
