= AFCB =

AFCB may refer to:

- AFC Bournemouth, an English football club
- American Fuel Cell Bus, a zero-emission transit bus
- Armed Forces Chaplains Board, a U.S. Department of Defense organization, advises on religion, ethics etc.
- Ghana Armed Forces Central Band, military band
