= Ghanaian smock =

Hand-loomed strips made of a mixture of dyed and undyed cotton loom

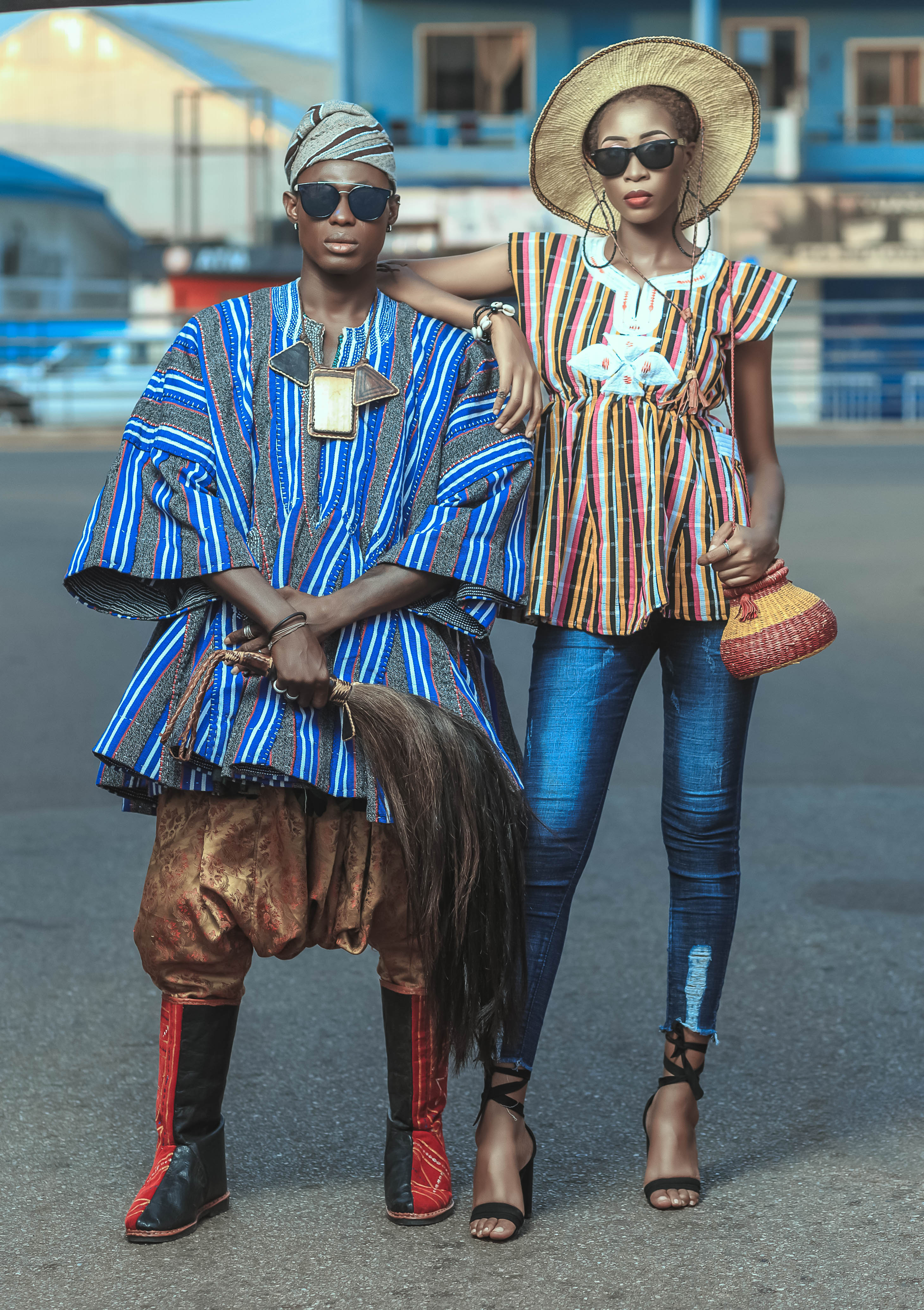
A gentleman and a lady in smock.

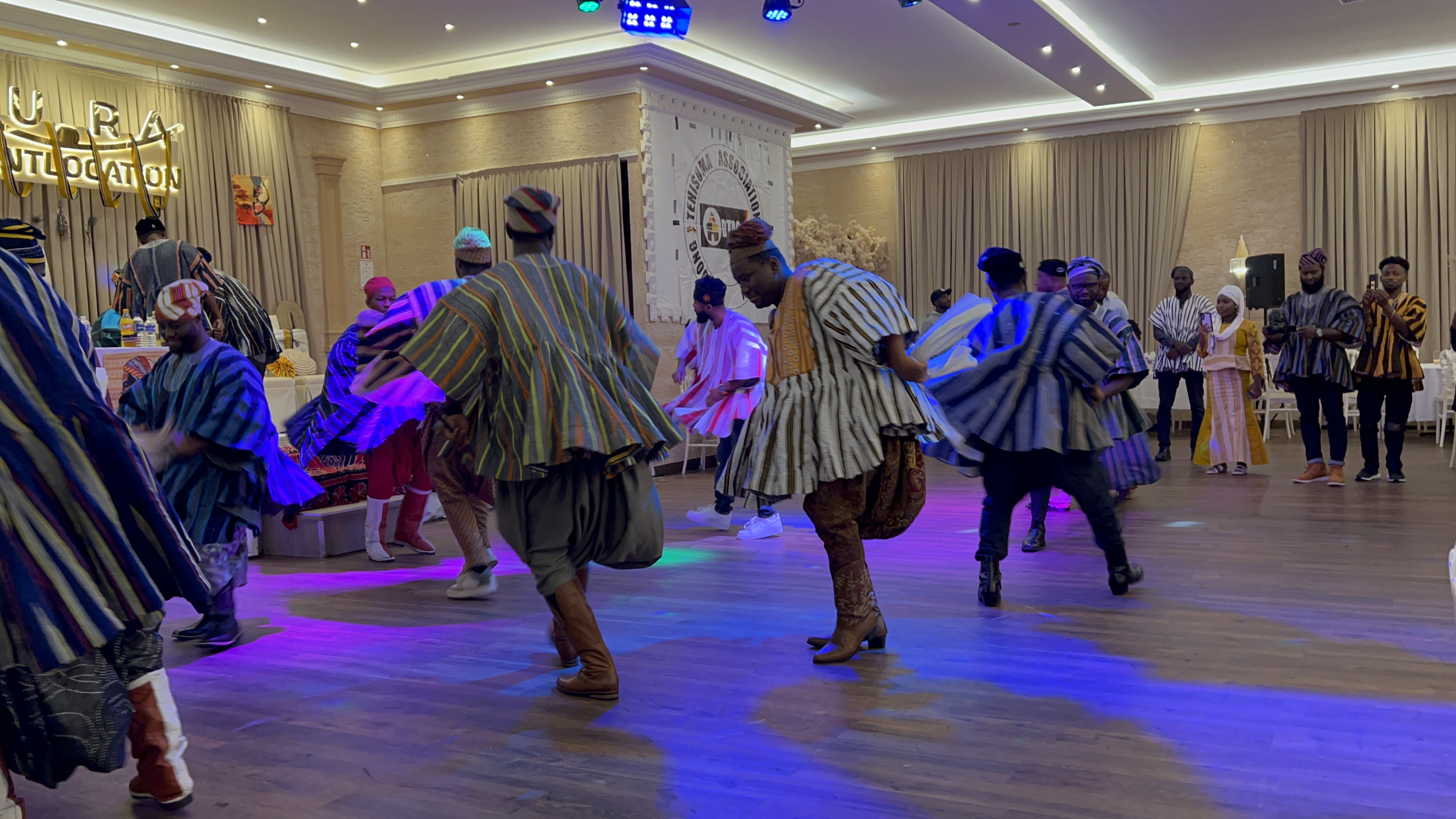
Celebrants in smock during the 2023 World Damba Festival in Germany.

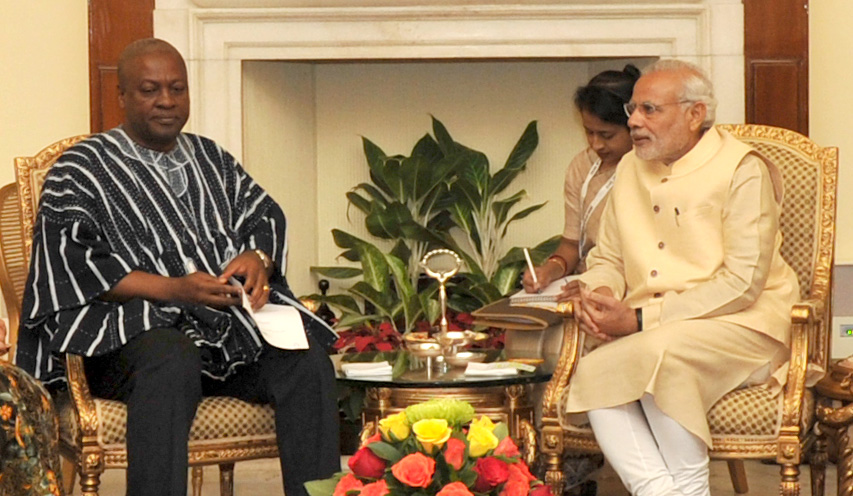
Ghana's president, John Dramani Mahama meeting a foreign leader in a smock.

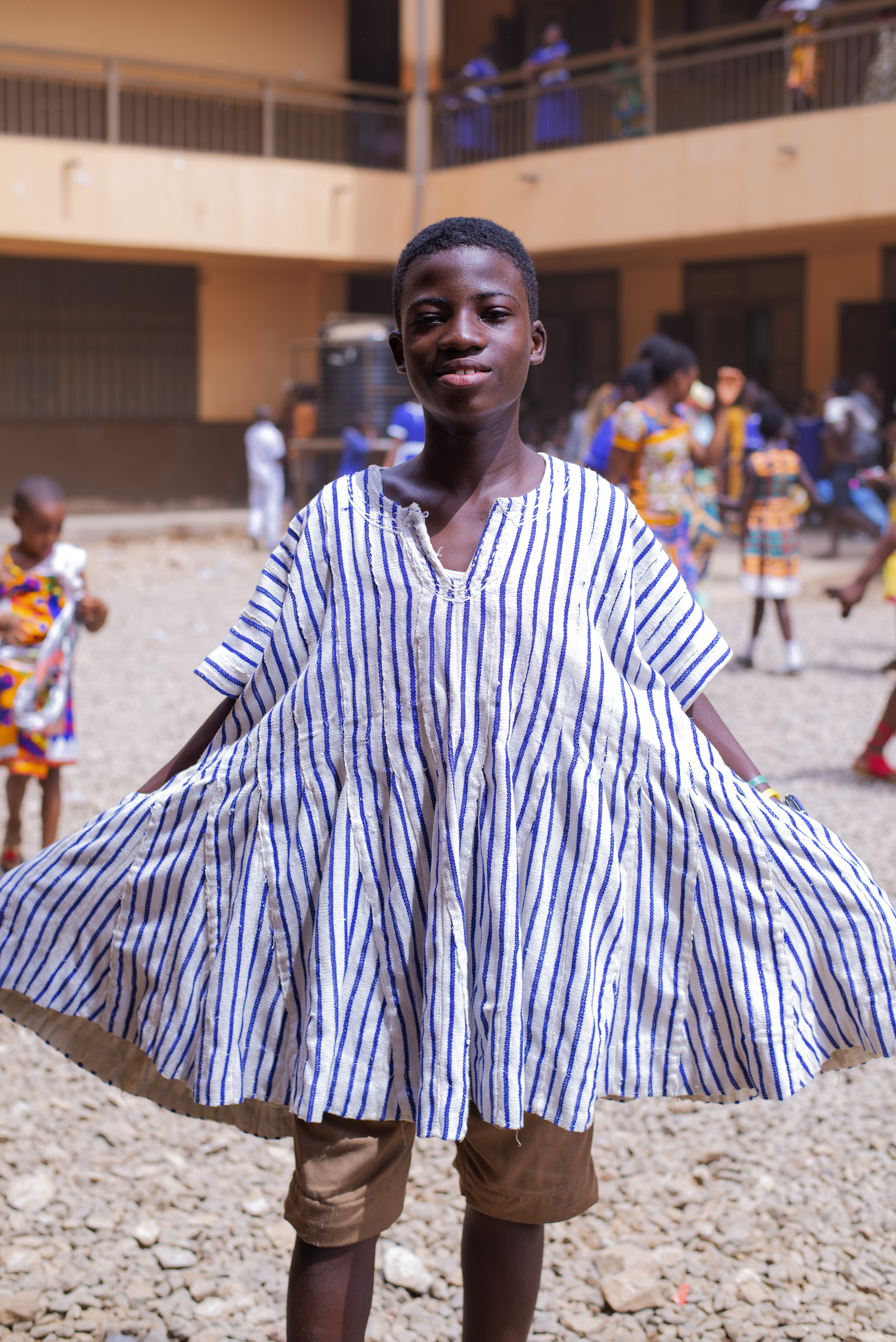
A boy wearing a heavy smock

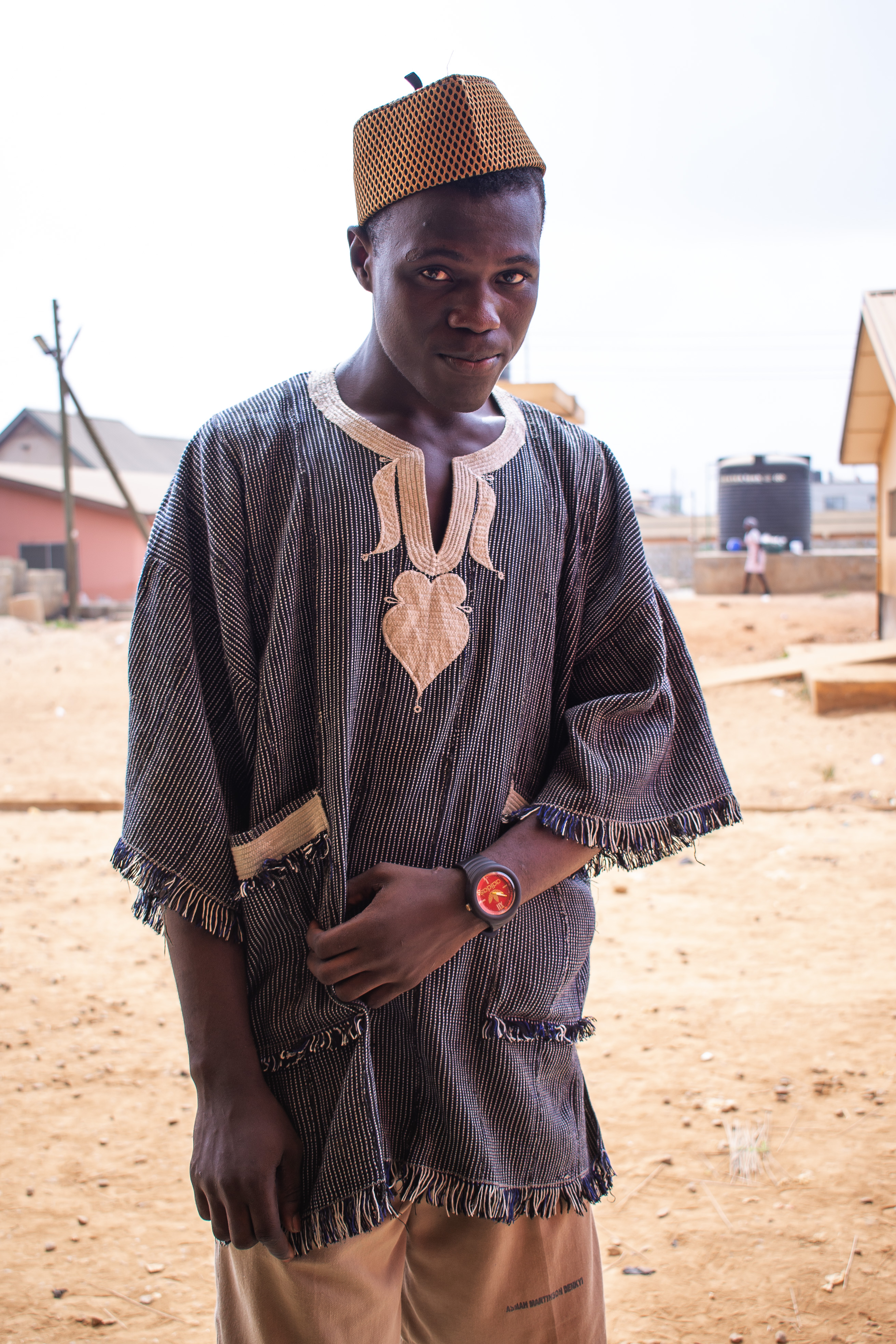
A man wearing a light smock

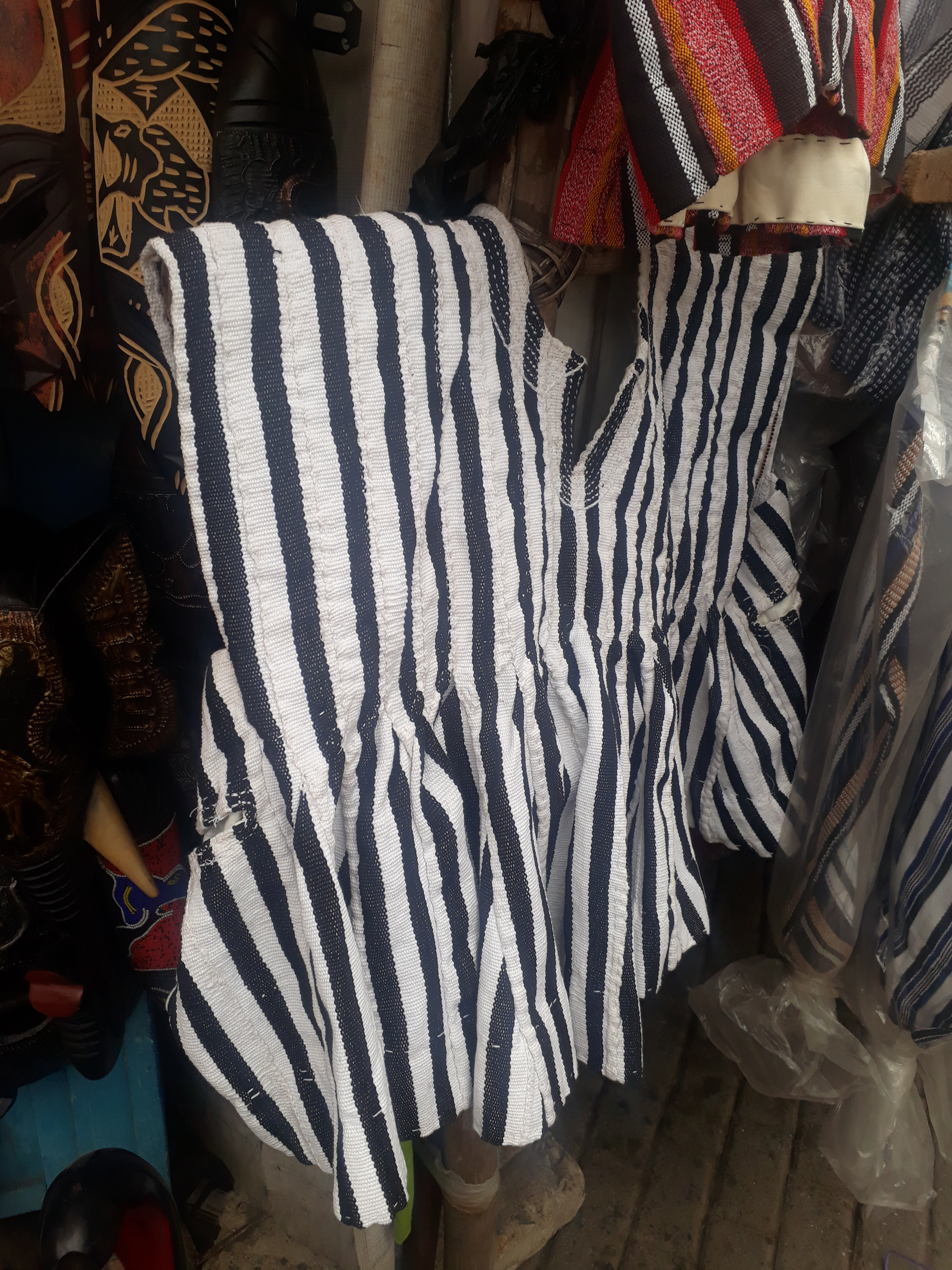
A sleeveless smock in display

The Ghanaian Smock also known as Fugu or Tani is a fabric worn by both women and men in Ghana mostly as a Northern Ghanaian attire. It is the most popular traditional attire in the country. The fabric is called Tani in Dagbani, while the male and female wear are respectively called Bin'gmaa and Bin'mangli. The smock is formally worn with a hat (zipligu)/ scarf (bobga), footwear (muɣri), and a trouser (kurugu).

The smock was famously worn by Ghana's founding fathers when they declared Ghana's independence from the British on March 6, 1957.

== Other names ==
The smock is also called Bun-nwↃ or Bana by Mamprusis, fugu in Mossi, batakari in the Asante dialect, dansika in Frafra, and Banaa in Kusaal both in the upper east region. It is worn by Royals and civilians across Dagbon and other northern regions, but popular across Ghana. The smock originated in the northern region of Ghana, during the reign of Yaa Naa Zanjina, but widely used in West Africa and across the world. It is similar to the national attire of Burkina Faso known as faso dan fadi.

The smock and Kente cloth are beautiful national dresses of Ghana. Kente cloth originated in the Ashanti region of Ghana. It was won traditionally by kings and chiefs especially the Asantehene.

== Production ==
The smock is traditionally made from hand-loomed strips comprising a blend of dyed and undyed cotton yarns. It is intricately sewn together by hand, resulting in a distinctive plaid pattern that characterizes the smock. Some variations showcase additional artistic elements, such as embroidery adorning the neckline.

A significant accessory to the smock is the Zipligu, a hat worn in conjunction with this traditional attire. An interesting aspect of the production process is the division of labour: women are traditionally responsible for making the strips, while men take on the task of making the smock itself.

== Origin ==
The smock was introduced in the 1600s during the reign of Yaa Naa Zanjina. It predates the modern suit. Today, the smock has been adopted widely outside Dagbon.

== The smock in the West ==
Historically, the smock was rarely seen in the West. As recently as the 1990s, immigrants from Ghana were the only individuals seen wearing the smock. All of that changed as the popularity of films produced in Ghana increased among Black Americans and Caribbeans. In recent years people of African descent have started wearing smocks to churches, mosques, African festivals, and Kwanzaa celebrations in major Western cities like New York and Kingston, Jamaica.

== Popular usage ==
In Ghana, smocks have traditionally been worn on Fridays. In 2026, the government designated Wednesdays as an official day to wear smocks. The weekly observance is known as Fugu day, which encourages the wearing and promotion of the traditional smock.

== Popular culture and art ==
=== Purple Hibiscus ===
Purple Hibiscus was a temporary, large-scale public art installation created by Ghanaian artist Ibrahim Mahama. Unveiled in April 2024, it transformed the facade of the Barbican Centre, a brutalist art and conference centre, in London, England. It was part of the Barbican Centre's exhibition "Unravel: The Power & Politics of Textiles in Art." The installation was on display from April 10 to August 18, 2024.

==== Description ====
The centrepiece of Purple Hibiscus was approximately 2,000 square meters of bespoke, hand-woven pink and purple fabric. Hundreds of craftspeople from Tamale, Ghana, created this fabric specifically for the installation. Sewn onto the fabric were roughly 100 "batakari" robes, traditionally worn by Ghanaians in both northern and southern regions. Mahama acquired these robes through barter and exchange within communities across Northern Ghana.

Significance

The title, Purple Hibiscus, referenced Chimamanda Ngozi Adichie's novel of the same name, which explores themes of family, tradition, and change in post-colonial Nigeria. The vibrant colours and textures of the installation contrasted starkly with the Barbican's concrete exterior. Mahama's use of handcrafted textiles highlighted the importance of human labour and traditional craft practices. The batakari robes themselves embodied the concept of intergenerational knowledge and cultural heritage. The artwork sparked discussions about colonialism, trade, and the history embedded within everyday objects.

== See also ==
- Dashiki
- Kente cloth
- Kufi
- National costume
