= I. B. Quartey =

Ghanaian military officer

Ishmael Ben Quartey
- Born: Jamestown, Accra, Ghana
- Allegiance: Ghana
- Branch: Ghana Army
- Service years: 1974–2013
- Rank: Brigadier General
- Commands: Support Services Brigade Group; Ghana Military Academy
- Conflicts: Second Congo War
- Education: University of Ibadan

Brigadier General Ishmael Ben Quartey is a retired Ghana army general whose last army appointment was as the commander of the Support Services Brigade of the Ghana Armed Forces (GAF) from 2010 to 2013. Following his retirement, he was appointed chairman of the Board of the Driver and Vehicle Licensing Authority (DVLA) in 2013 and later additionally appointed as Acting Managing Director of Metro Mass Transit from 2015 to 2017.

During his military career, he held several command and staff appointments, including Commanding Officer of the Armoured Reconnaissance Regiment, Commander of the Ghana Military Academy, and Commander of the Support Services Brigade. In 2008, he was appointed the acting UN force commander in Congo.

== Early life and education ==
Quartey was born in Jamestown, Accra. He attended Accra Royal Basic School and later Accra Academy, where he obtained his General Certificate of Education (GCE) Ordinary and Advanced Level qualifications in 1971 and 1973 respectively.

He trained at the Ghana Military Academy, where he graduated as the best cadet of his intake and was awarded the Sword of Honour. He also attended the Ghana Armed Forces Command and Staff College and the National Defence College, Nigeria. He received Armor training at Fort Knox in Kentucky, United States. He graduated from the University of Ibadan with a Master of Science degree in Strategic Studies.

== Military career ==
Quartey enlisted in the Ghana Armed Forces in 1974 and served for approximately 39 years.

He held several command and staff appointments, including Commanding Officer of the Armoured Reconnaissance Regiment, Commander of the Ghana Military Academy, and Commander of the Support Services Brigade Group.

=== United Nations peacekeeping operations ===
Quartey served with the Ghana Armed Forces contingent in United Nations peacekeeping operations, including a deployment under the United Nations Mission in the Democratic Republic of the Congo (MONUC).

Within MONUC, he served as Western Brigade Commander, where he coordinated brigade-level multinational operations in support of the mission's stabilisation mandate in eastern Democratic Republic of the Congo. His responsibilities included operational planning, troop coordination, and liaison with United Nations military and civilian components in the mission area.

In 2008, he was appointed Acting Force Commander of MONUC by the United Nations Secretary-General, providing interim leadership of the mission's military component during a transitional period.

== Post-military career ==
=== Driver and Vehicle Licensing Authority ===
In November 2013, Quartey was appointed chairman of the Board of the Driver and Vehicle Licensing Authority (DVLA), where he oversaw institutional reforms aimed at improving road safety regulation and service delivery modernization.

The board assumed office in Accra in November 2013 and prioritised automation of services and improved administrative efficiency.

=== Metro Mass Transit ===
In January 2015, Quartey was appointed Acting Managing Director of Metro Mass Transit Limited (MMT) following the dissolution of the company's board and restructuring of its senior management.

He formally assumed office on 19 January 2015 in Accra and was tasked with stabilising operations and improving service delivery within the company.

At the time of his appointment, MMT was undergoing administrative restructuring following governance challenges.

He also stated his intention to improve operational efficiency and restore public confidence in the organisation.

== Other activities ==
Quartey has been involved in sports administration, particularly boxing, serving as a patron of the Ghana Boxing Authority and as a member of the Ghana Boxing Interim Management Committee.

He has also served as vice-president of the Retired Commissioned Officers Association of Ghana.

== Personal life ==
He is married with children and has served on the Board of Governors of Accra Academy.
