= 2023 in Ghana =

- Decades: 2000s; 2010s; 2020s
- See also: Other events of 2023; Timeline of Ghanaian history

Events in the year 2023 in Ghana.

== Incumbents ==
- President – Nana Akufo-Addo
- Vice President – Mahamudu Bawumia
- Speaker of Parliament – Alban Bagbin
- Chief Justice – Kwasi Anin-Yeboah

== Events ==
Ongoing — COVID-19 pandemic in Ghana

- 4 November: 2024 Ghanaian general election: Vice-President Mahamudu Bawumia is nominated by the country's ruling New Patriotic Party as their presidential candidate.

== Sports ==
- 2022–23 Ghana Premier League

== Deaths ==
- February 6: Christian Atsu, 31, footballer (Newcastle United, Hatayspor, national team)
- February 17: Peter Nanfuri, 80, police officer, inspector general of police (1996–2001).
- March 19: Emmanuel Oblitey, 89, Olympic footballer (1964).
- March 20: Anthony Akoto Osei, 69, banker and politician, minister for finance (2007–2009) and MP (since 2005).
- March 23: Letitia Obeng, 98, educational pioneer.
- May 16: Akwaboah Snr, singer-songwriter.
- May 31: Ama Ata Aidoo, 81, author and playwright (The Dilemma of a Ghost, Anowa), minister of education (1982–1983).
- July 22: Sherry Ayittey, 75, Ghanaian politician and women's activist, minister for environment, science and technology (2009–2013), health (2013–2014), fisheries and aquaculture development (2014–2017)

== See also ==
- African Continental Free Trade Area
- COVID-19 pandemic in Africa
