= Peter Tasiri =

Ghanaian soldier and politician (1930/1931–2026)

Peter Tasiri Azongo

Member of the Armed Forces Revolutionary Council
- In office June 1979 – September 1979
- President: Jerry Rawlings
- Vice President: Major Boakye-Djan

Personal details
- Born: 1930 or 1931
- Died: 15 February 2026 (aged 95) Pusiga, Ghana
- Profession: Soldier

Military service
- Allegiance: Ghana Armed Forces
- Branch/service: Ghana Army
- Rank: Sergeant
- Unit: Fifth Infantry Battalion

Peter Tasiri Azongo (1930 or 1931 – 15 February 2026) was a Ghanaian soldier and politician. He was a member of the Armed Forces Revolutionary Council (AFRC) which ruled Ghana for a few months in 1979.

== Career ==
Tasiri was with the Fifth Infantry Battalion at the time of the 4 June 1979 coup and became a member of the government.

== 4 June revolution and AFRC ==
Tasiri was reported to have been one of the key persons who initiated the action of 4 June 1979 which overthrew the Supreme Military Council (SMC) military government led by Lt. General Fred Akuffo. He was a member of the Free Africa Movement which was led by Major Boakye-Djan. They had been under suspicion and Baah Achamfuor whom they had recruited was actually arrested on 3 June 1979.

He disclosed that he was in charge of discipline as a member of the AFRC. He stated that the destruction of the Makola Market during the AFRC rule was to help arrest indiscipline among the market women.

== Post AFRC ==
Tasiri was sent to the United States for studies by the Limann government after they handed over power in September 1979. While testifying before the National Reconciliation Commission in 2003, he reiterated a group apology offered by some of the members of the AFRC for atrocities committed during their rule. He stated that acts of indiscipline were due to the misuse of other ranks by officers. He also called on Jerry Rawlings to testify before the commission.

== Assault ==
Tasiri lived at Mandango in the Pusiga district near Bawku. Following a dispute with his brother Musah Tasiri, he was summoned to the palace of the Pusiga Naba (Chief of Pusiga) Akut Akwaka. He was assaulted when he attended and different reasons were given for the assault.

== Death ==
Tasiri died in Pusiga on 15 February 2026, at the age of 95.

== See also ==
- Armed Forces Revolutionary Council
