= 2021 in Ghana =

- Decades: 2000s; 2010s; 2020s
- See also: Other events of 2021; Timeline of Ghanaian history

Events in the year 2021 in Ghana.

== Incumbents ==
- President: Nana Akufo-Addo
- Vice President: Mahamudu Bawumia

== Events ==
Ongoing — COVID-19 pandemic in Ghana

- 7 January – 2020 Ghanaian general election: The Ghana Army steps in to put down a fight in Parliament. President Nana Akufo-Addo is sworn in for another term.
- 21 January – Police arrest 11 in a ″baby-harvesting″ scheme in Accra and Tema.
- 9 January – Parliament is forced to close for three weeks after 17 Members and 171 staff contract COVID-19.
- 24 February
  - 600,000 doses of the Oxford–AstraZeneca COVID-19 vaccine arrive in Accra. This is the first vaccine shipment under the UN-sponsored COVAX plan. Ghana reports 81,215 cases of infection, 6,614 active cases, and 584 deaths.
  - The offices of ″LGBT+ Rights Ghana″ are closed by security forces.
- 20 May - 2021 Ghana gay arrests
- 11 June – During the 2021 United Nations Security Council Elections, Ghana was elected to serve a two-year term on the UN Security Council as a non-permanent member. Its term, starting in 2022, will mark the fourth time Ghana has sat on the Security Council.

== Sports ==
- 2020–21 Ghana Premier League
- 24 August to 5 September – Ghana at the 2020 Summer Paralympics

== Deaths ==
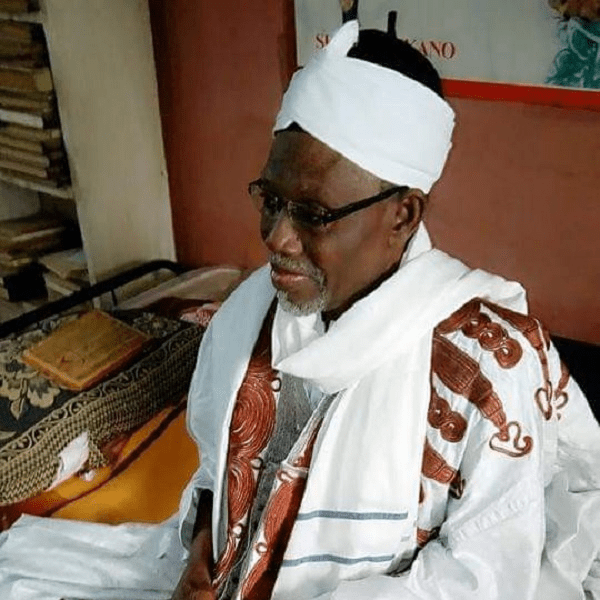
Sakib Bamba

- 2 January – Sakib Bamba, religious leader, chief Imam of Ejura.
- 18 January – Joshua Kyeremeh, politician; kidney complications.
- 23 January – Abukari Gariba, 81, Olympic footballer (1968, 1972).
- 1 February – Joshua Hamidu, 85, military officer and diplomat, Chief of the Defence Staff (1978–1979), High Commissioner to Zambia (1978) and Nigeria (2003–2005).
- 9 February – Emmanuel Kojo Dadson, 68, actor (Love Brewed in the African Pot, Run Baby Run, Elmina).
- 11 February – George Benneh, 86, academic administrator and politician, Minister of Finance (1981) and Vice-Chancellor of the University of Ghana (1992–1996).
- 20 February – Rosamond Asiamah Nkansah, 91, police officer, first woman recruited into the Ghanaian force.
- 25 February – Bob Pixel, photographer; COVID-19.
- 4 March – DJ Adviser, disc jockey (Happy FM).
- 7 April – Emmanuel Evans-Anfom, physician and university administrator.

== See also ==
- African Continental Free Trade Area
- COVID-19 pandemic in Africa
