= Ghana Armed Forces Central Band =

Military parades band Ghana

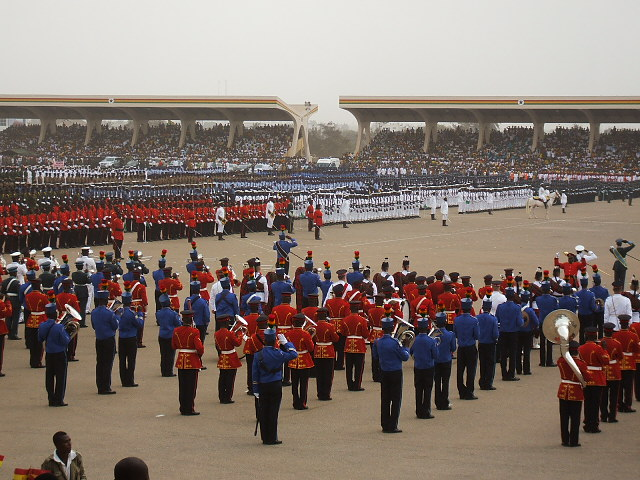
Members of the GAF Central Band (dressed in Orange) performing as part of a massed band at Ghana's 50th anniversary parade in 2007.

The Ghana Armed Forces Central Band (GAF Central Band or AFCB) is the official military band of the Ghana Armed Forces. The AFCB is the oldest military band in the country and the most senior in the military, hence its name. Its command structure runs through the Support Services Brigade (in an arrangement designated in the mid-1980s) while its official branch of service is the Ghana Army. It is currently led by Lieutenant Colonel Johnathan Gerrard Mawah and directed by Colonel George Abosi Oppong. Musicians are recruited from all branches of the armed forces, with soldiers being required to have 2 credits and 4 passes at West African Senior School Certificate Examination (WASSCE), as well as have to be at least 27 years old.

== Ghanaian military band history ==
Drums and blowing through pipes were a common aspect of military bands even before the United Kingdom came to control Ghana. The earliest indication of a military band in the Gold Coast was during the Battle of Nsamankow in 1824. The Royal Military Band of Kumasi, Gold Coast was a British Army band that was dressed in a mix of traditional and British style uniforms, having a mix of European brass instruments as well as western style drums. In the 1970s, Lieutenant Colonel Robert Budu Larbi served as band director.

== The band today ==
State functions that are supported by the GAF Band include the Trooping of the Colour on Independence Day, state visits and the guard mounting ceremony at Accra's Jubilee House. Members of the band perform in army uniforms similar to those of the President's Own Guard Regiment. In November 2001, Defence Minister Kwame Addo-Kufuor personally conducted the band. The band and the 66th Artillery Regiment were present during the inauguration of President Alassane Ouattara of Côte d'Ivoire in Yamoussoukro on 21 May 2011. As a result, President John Evans Atta Mills personally consulted with the band (led by then Lieutenant Colonel Francis Ennin) and the regiment in Osu Castle, apologizing to both for the fact that their Ghanaian plane could not return them home due to technical difficulties in landing and announcing that the country would acquire two special purpose planes from Brazil. In appreciation of the band, Mills said: "Your performance made us very proud. On behalf of the Government and people of Ghana, I say a very big thank you for your exceptional performance". In August 2012, Colonel Sampson Paa-Kwesi Ebonyi (the then director of music of the band) was a guest conductor for the United States Air Force Band. The two bands have also performed together during the former's visit to Ghana in the mid-2010s.

Military bands in Ghana today are divided between three units, the AFCB, the Ghana Navy Band, and the Ghana Air Force Band (representing the Army, Navy and Air Force respectively). The AFCB is supported in training by the Armed Forces Music School.
