= Military ranks of Ghana =

The Military ranks of Ghana are the military insignia used by the Ghana Armed Forces. Being a former colony of the United Kingdom, Ghana shares a rank structure similar to that of the United Kingdom.

== Current ranks ==
=== Commissioned officer ranks ===
The rank insignia of commissioned officers.

Rank group	General / flag officers					Senior officers			Junior officers
Ghana Army
Ghana Army	Field marshal	General	Lieutenant general	Major general	Brigadier	Colonel	Lieutenant colonel	Major	Captain	Lieutenant	Second lieutenant
Ghana Navy
Ghana Navy		Admiral	Vice admiral	Rear admiral	Commodore	Captain	Commander	Lieutenant commander	Lieutenant	Sub lieutenant
Ghana Air Force
Ghana Air Force		Air chief marshal	Air marshal	Air vice-marshal	Air commodore	Group captain	Wing commander	Squadron leader	Flight lieutenant	Flying officer	Pilot officer
Rank group	General / flag officers					Senior officers			Junior officers

=== Other ranks ===
The rank insignia of non-commissioned officers and enlisted personnel.

Rank group	Senior NCOs					Junior NCOs		Enlisted
Ghana Army								No insignia
Ghana Army	Warrant officer class 1	Warrant officer class 2	Staff sergeant	Sergeant		Corporal	Lance corporal	Private (or equivalent)
Ghana Navy								No insignia	No insignia
Ghana Navy			Chief petty officer	Petty officer first class	Petty officer second class	Leading seaman		Able seaman	Ordinary seaman
Ghana Air Force									No insignia
Ghana Air Force	Warrant officer class I	Warrant officer class II	Flight sergeant	Sergeant		Corporal		Leading aircraftsman	Aircraftsman
Rank group	Senior NCOs					Junior NCOs		Enlisted

== Former ranks ==
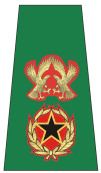
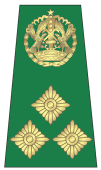
Rank group	General / flag officers					Senior officers			Junior officers
Ghana Army (1959–?)
Ghana Army (1959–?)	Field marshal (Note: Reserved for the President of Ghana.)	General	Lieutenant general	Major general	Brigadier	Colonel	Lieutenant colonel	Major	Captain	Lieutenant	Second lieutenant
