= 2022 in Ghana =

- Decades: 2000s; 2010s; 2020s
- See also: Other events of 2022; Timeline of Ghanaian history

Events in the year 2022 in Ghana.

== Incumbents ==
- President – Nana Akufo-Addo
- Vice President – Mahamudu Bawumia
- Speaker of Parliament – Alban Bagbin
- Chief Justice – Kwasi Anin-Yeboah

== Events ==
Ongoing — COVID-19 pandemic in Ghana

- 20 January – A truck carrying explosives to a gold mine explodes after crashing into a motorcycle in Apiate, Western Region; the explosion destroyed nearby buildings and vehicles, killing 17 people and injuring 59 others.

== Deaths ==
- Kwesi Botchwey, 78, Ghanaian politician, minister for finance and economic planning (1982–1999)

== See also ==
- African Continental Free Trade Area
- COVID-19 pandemic in Africa
