= Accra–Kumasi Expressway =

Proposed expressway in Ghana

Accra–Kumasi Expressway is a proposed 198.7 km expressway starting from Accra to Kumasi that, when completed, will become Ghana's first six-lane access-controlled tolled expressway. The Parliament of Ghana has approved the construction of the road. It is expected that multiple local contractors will be responsible for the construction with a limit of not more than 10 kilometres (6.2 mi) per contractor.

== Description ==
When completed, Accra–Kumasi Expressway will be a 198.7 km expressway connecting Accra to Kumasi, making it Ghana's first six-lane access-controlled tolled expressway. The expressway will include two 20-lane automated toll plazas and go through the Greater Accra, Eastern and Ashanti Regions.

== History ==
Accra–Kumasi Expressway was proposed by the Ghanaian government in the 2026 Budget Statement and Economic Policy on 13 November 2025. $1.7 billion was set aside for the road, and, as part of the Big Push Infrastructure Programme, the Parliament of Ghana approved the construction of the road in the following month. The Minister of Roads and Highways, Kwame Governs Agbodza, said that the Accra–Kumasi Expressway would not replace the current highway In January 2026, Ghanaian president John Mahama announced that construction would begin, It is expected that multiple local contractors will be responsible for the construction with a limit of not more than 10 kilometres (6.2 mi) per contractor in order for Accra–Kumasi Expressway to be completed by January 2029.

=== Birimso Bridge crash ===
On 3 August 2026, a multi-vehicle crash occurred at Birimso Bridge on the Accra–Kumasi Highway, killing at least 15 people and urging the Minority in Parliament to improve the highway's safety, requesting that the government use $300 million of the Accra–Kumasi Expressway's funds to complete unfinished sections of the highway.

=== 13 August 2026 Crash ===
On 13 August 2026, twelve people were killed and 13 others were injured after two trucks, two minibuses, two cars and a tricycle collided.

== See also ==
- Ghana Road Network
