= Sulemana Abdul Samed =

Tallest person in Ghana (1994–2026)

- Born: 1994; Northern Region of Ghana
- Died: 27 July 2026 (aged 32)

Sulemana Abdul Samed (1994 – 27 July 2026), also known as Awuche (meaning 'Let's Go' in the Hausa language), was the tallest man in Ghana.

== Biography ==
Sulemana Abdul Samed was born in the Northern Region of Ghana in 1994. Abdul Samed was diagnosed with the endocrine disorder acromegaly, which is caused by an excess of growth hormone in the body. In 2022, BBC reporter Favour Nunoo heard claims of a man standing at 289.56 centimetres (9 ft 6 in) tall. The hospital was not equipped to take a measurement after Samed had outgrown their scale, so there was some uncertainty in the claim. Nunoo visited Samed and measured him at 223.52 centimetres (7 ft 4 in) using a 488-centimetre (16 ft) tape measure.

He underwent treatment for his condition. Despite his unusual height, he lived a relatively normal life, attending school and being employed as a farmer and a mechanic. He had stated that he hoped to marry and have children.

Abdul Samed received media attention for his height, which he used to raise awareness about acromegaly and the challenges faced by people who have the condition.

Abdul Samed died on 27 July 2026, at the age of 32. His family announced he would be buried in Tamale.
