= 2024 in Ghana =

- Decades: 2000s; 2010s; 2020s
- See also: Other events of 2024; Timeline of Ghanaian history

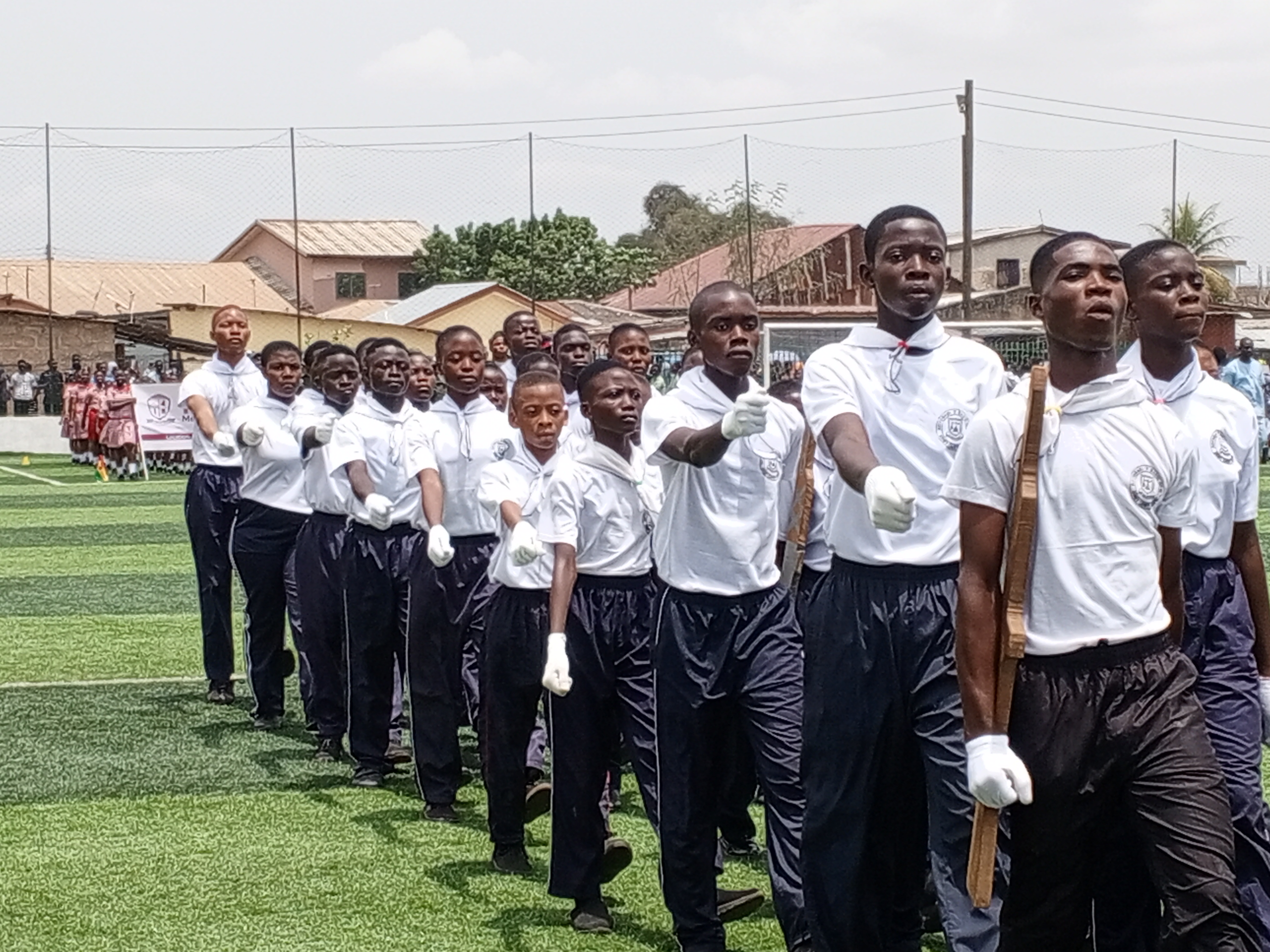
School students marching during Ghana's 67th Independence Anniversary, March 6 2024.

Events in the year 2024 in Ghana.

== Incumbents ==
- President – Nana Akufo-Addo
- Vice President – Mahamudu Bawumia
- Speaker of Parliament – Alban Bagbin
- Chief Justice – Kwasi Anin-Yeboah

== Events ==
Ongoing — COVID-19 pandemic in Ghana

=== February ===
- 28 February – The Parliament of Ghana passes the Ghanaian anti-LGBT bill making the promotion or advocacy of LGBT rights punishable by five years in prison.

=== March ===
- 8–23 March – 2023 African Games

=== September ===
- 21 September – A fuel tanker crashes into a bus in Suhum, killing seven people and injuring 31 others.

=== October ===
- 3 October – Ghana reports its first case of mpox this year.
- 14 October – A bus falls into a ditch in Kwapia, Ashanti Region, killing 13 people.
- 18 October: Parliament speaker Alban Bagbin declares four seats held by MPs who switched parties vacant, effectively giving the opposition National Democratic Congress a majority in the legislature. The decision is overturned by the Supreme Court on 12 November.
- 26 October – Foreign minister Shirley Ayorkor Botchwey is named as Secretary-General of the Commonwealth of Nations.
- 27 October – At least 20 people are killed in clashes over a chieftaincy dispute in Bawku.
- 28 October – Ghana Freedom Party leader and presidential candidate Akua Donkor dies in a hospital in Accra following an illness.

=== November ===
- 20 November – The Bank Square was commissioned as the new headquarters of the Bank of Ghana.

=== December ===
- 7 December – 2024 Ghanaian general election: Former president John Mahama is elected to a second non-consecutive term as president. His running-mate, Jane Naana Opoku-Agyemang, also becomes the first woman to be elected as Vice-President of Ghana.

== Sports ==
- 2023–24 Ghana Premier League
- 2023 African Games

== Deaths ==
- 3 January – Imoro Muniratu, 72, food vendor.
- 4 January – Felicia Abban, 87, photographer.
- 9 January – Agnes Asangalisa Chigabatia, 67, politician, MP (2005–2009).
- 17 January – Mark Woyongo, 77, politician, MP (2013–2017), minister for defence (2013–2014) and the interior (2014–2017).
- 18 January – Vincent McCauley, actor (Things We Do for Love).
- 7 March – John Kumah, deputy minister of finance.

== See also ==
- African Continental Free Trade Area
