= Support Services Brigade =

Ghana Armed Forces military unit

- Active: 30 January 1961
- Country: Ghana
- Branch: Army (1969-1996); Ghana Armed Forces (1996-present)
- Type: Support
- Garrison/HQ: Accra

Commanders
- Current commander: Brigadier General Selassie Gagakuma
- Notable commanders: Brigadier General Musa Whajah

The Support Services Brigade is a unit of the Ghana Armed Forces.

== History ==
The expansion of the Ghana military support unit was completed in 1962 with the establishment of the Ghana Army by an act of the Parliament of Ghana and restructuring of the Ghana Army into two infantry brigades, the 1st and the 2nd.

The Common Services Establishment Committee was formed in January 1969 with the aim of creating a logistics brigade for the Ghana Army using auxiliary units. In October 1969, the services and units were combined to form the Support Services Brigade Group, primarily for administrative efficiency rather than operational purposes. The new Brigade's headquarters consisted mostly of troops from the Army Engineers, who were involved in various civil assistance activities such as the construction of the Akosombo Dam. The initial commander of the headquarters was Colonel Douglas Sanni-Thomas, who was later replaced by Colonel Victor Coker-Appiah.

In May 1985, the Support Service Brigade Group was created, and it was reactivated in June 1987 under the Army Headquarters. The headquarters was relocated to Medo Lines, Burma Camp.

In 1996, the brigade underwent reorganization and was no longer under the command of the Army Headquarters. Instead, it was placed under the General Headquarters, along with all the units under it.

== Units ==
As of 2016, the units under the Support Services Brigade Group are:

- HQ Special Services Brigade
- GHQ (Camp)
- 49th Engineer Regiment
- Headquarters, Ghana Military Police
- Defence Signal Regiment
- Forces Pay Regiment (FPR)
- Mechanical Transport Battalion
- Base Ordnance Depot (BOD)
- Base Ammunition Depot (BAD)
- Base Supply Depot (BSD)
- Armed Forces Printing Press (AFPP)
- Armed Forces Fire Service (AFFS)
- Base Workshop
- Armed Forces Central Band (AFCB)
- Ghana Armed Forces Institute (GAFI)
- Armed Forces Museum
- 5 Forces Movement Unit (5 FMU)
- 1 Forces Movement Unit (5 FMU)
- Forces Records Office (FRO)
- 5 Garrison Education Centre
- Army Signal Training School (ASTS)
- Armed Forces Secondary Technical School (AFSTS)

== See also ==
- Logistical Support of the Russian Armed Forces
