= Jonathan Quartey =

Jonathan Quartey may refer to:

- Jonathan Quartey (footballer, born 1984), Ghanaian-Vietnamese football striker
- Jonathan Quartey (footballer, born 1988), Ghanaian football defender
