= Batakari =

Ghanaian traditional attire

The African fugu (smock) also called batakari in the Asante Twi language, is a traditional garment from West Africa. Though it originates from Northern Ghana, it has gained acceptance throughout the country. The name fugu is a translation from the Moshie word for cloth.The Dagombas call the garment bingmaa.

In the 19th century, the batakari was worn by Ashanti military forces as a war dress. It was made out of cotton and covered with leather pouches and metal cases that contained talismans as it was believed by the Ashanti forces that this variant of the batakari was bulletproof.
