= Founders' Day (Ghana) =

Public Holiday in Ghana

- Official name: Founders' Day
- Observed by: Ghana
- Significance: Honour founding fathers of Ghana
- Date: 21 September
- Next time: 21 September 2026
- Frequency: Annual

Founders' Day is a national public holiday observed to commemorate the contributions of all the people, notably the "Big Six" who led the struggle for Ghana's independence. Founders' Day was formerly called "Founder's Day" (with the letter "S" appearing after an apostrophe) and it was celebrated to commemorate the achievements of Osagyefo Dr. Kwame Nkrumah.

Kwame Nkrumah was the first President of Ghana and a member of the "Big Six". He was born on 21 September, hence Founders' Day being celebrated on 21 September each year in honour of his participation in the Ghanaian movement for independence from British colonial rule. Other members of the "Big Six" were Edward Akufo-Addo, Joseph Boakye Danquah, Emmanuel Obetsebi-Lamptey, William Ofori Atta, and Ebenezer Ako-Adjei.

During Nana Akufo-Addo's presidency, several prominent members of his government suggested that other members of the "Big Six" who were part of the struggle for Ghana's independence should also be honoured in the celebration. Notably, this included strong statements made by the former speaker of parliament, Aaron Mike Oquaye, who said that it was "palpably false" to claim that Nkrumah was the founder of Ghana. As a result, the name was changed from "Founder's Day" to "Founders' Day" – making the word plural to honour the other members of the "Big Six", and include them in the Founders' Day celebrations.

== History ==
The Founders' Day (which was formerly spelt as "Founder's Day") was observed in Ghana on 21 September in year each to mark the birthdate of Ghana's first president, Osagyefo Dr. Kwame Nkrumah, and in remembrance of the struggle for independence by Ghana's brave "Big Six" as the name implies. President Nana Addo Dankwa Akufo-Addo upon assuming office and based on the call to celebrate other members of the "Big Six" proposed a legislation to Parliament to designate 4 August as a new date of the Founders' Day celebration, to widen the scope of the celebration to cover all people who played a key role in the liberation of the country.

4 August was apparently chosen as the substantive date to mark founders' day to purposely mark two important days or events in the history of Ghana. Firstly, on 4 August 1897, Gold Coast Aborigines' Rights Protection Society led by John Mensah Sarbah was formed. Furthermore, the United Gold Coast Convention (UGCC) was formed on 4 August 1947 by J.B. Danquah and George Alfred Paa Grant.

President Nana Addo Dankwa Akufo-Addo again proposed that 21 September however should be instituted as Kwame Nkrumah Memorial Day, to commemorate his birthdate. The decision separated the "Founder's Day" celebration as an honour of the "Big Six" from Dr. Kwame Nkrumah's Memorial Day celebration on his birthdate at the heroic leader of Ghana's independence attainment and a former President of Ghana.

In March 2019, the public holiday amendments bill was passed into law by the Ghanaian government and 4 August was instituted as the "Founders' Day," a day which coincides with the formation of the first political party in the country – the United Gold Coast Convention (UGCC) on 4 August 1947. The Founders' Day is reserved to celebrate and honour the people (The Big Six) who led Ghana to independence whilst Kwame Nkrumah Memorial Day is reserved for Osagyefo Dr. Kwame Nkrumah's birthdate the leader of the movement towards independence.

== Significance of the day ==
The "Founders' Day" is also a day on which the Ghanaians take the opportunity to reflect the sacrifices of their fore-bearers who fought for Ghana's independence. There are a number of celebratory activities during the day including talks, discussions, public lectures, etc. about the country's past, present and future. Activities during the celebration and observance of the "Founders' Day" are meant to encourage the Ghanaians within the country and in the diaspora to accept Ghana as their homeland. Also, these activities as well as the day is to reignite patriotism in Ghanaians.

Besides the celebration of the "Founders' Day" encourage Ghanaians to appreciate the sacrificial roles its leaders had played while they do the same by committing to the country in all endeavours.

== Public lectures ==
- 4 August 2019

The first Founders' Day, which is 4 August 2019 fell on a weekend therefore the Interior Minister, Ambrose Dery, in a statement said in view of the day falling on a Sunday, the President Nana Addo Dankwa Akufo-Addo by Executive Instrument (EI), declared Monday, 5 August, as a public holiday to be observed as such throughout the country, he held a Luncheon in honor of Senior citizens at Accra International Conference Centre.

- 4 August 2020

The public lecture was chaired by the Overlord of Dagbon, Yaa Naa Abubakari Mahama II, with other traditional rulers from Dagbon being present. The Speaker of Parliament, Prof. Aaron Mike Oquaye delivered a public lecture. The spokesperson of Yaa Naa, Zamgbali Naa, Dr Jacob Mahama, in his tribute hailed all persons who contributed to the fight for independence and reiterated the essence of honoring all and sundry without focusing entirely on Kwame Nkrumah.

Key personalities such as the Chief of Staff, Mrs Akosua Frema Opare; the Majority Leader and Minister for Parliamentary Affairs, Mr Osei Kyei-Mensah-Bonsu; the Minister of Food and Agriculture, Dr Owusu Afriyie Akoto; the Minister of Information, Mr Kojo Oppong Nkrumah; the President of the Ghana Journalists Association (GJA), Mr Roland Affail Monney were present at the lecture.

The Open Foundation West Africa launched its Founders Day Ghana writing contest to increase Ghanaian literature of personalities and events on Wikipedia. The contest, which spans from 1 to 31 August 2020 seeks to create awareness and educate the public on the significance of Founders Day and also encourage the curation of content about Ghana's history.

- 4 August 2022

On Thursday 4 August 2022, to commemorate Ghana's Founding Fathers, the Danquah Institute held a lecture on the theme "The Independence Struggle: Our Heroes and the Fight for Democracy".

== Controversies ==
However, there has been some contention by the opposition National Democratic Congress (NDC) and Convention People's Party's (CPP) to cancel it with their premise being that the new holiday is not a true representation of historical facts and is a deliberate attempt by the Akufo-Addo government to rewrite the country's history.

According to the NDC, Akufo-Addo seeks to give prominence to his uncle JB Danquah who was a leader in the United Gold Coast Convention (UGCC), the political party from which Kwame Nkrumah broke away to form the CPP which won him the election that saw him become Leader of Government Business and Prime Minister and eventually the first president of Ghana.

Dr. Samuel Adu-Gyamfi, a senior lecturer in the history and political studies program at Kwame Nkrumah University of Science and Technology (KNUST), claims that the president appears to be pursuing an agenda to overexpand the United Gold Coast Convention (UGCC), which was founded in 1947 by J.B. Danquah and George Alfred "Paa" Grant. "The president's move will simply polarize Ghanaians because the proposed celebration lacks a foundation in Ghana's past and won't foster national cohesion," he claimed.

== See also ==
- Public holidays in Ghana
- Founders' Day (Ghana): Importance and Controversy
