= Farmers' Day =

Worldwide annual observance

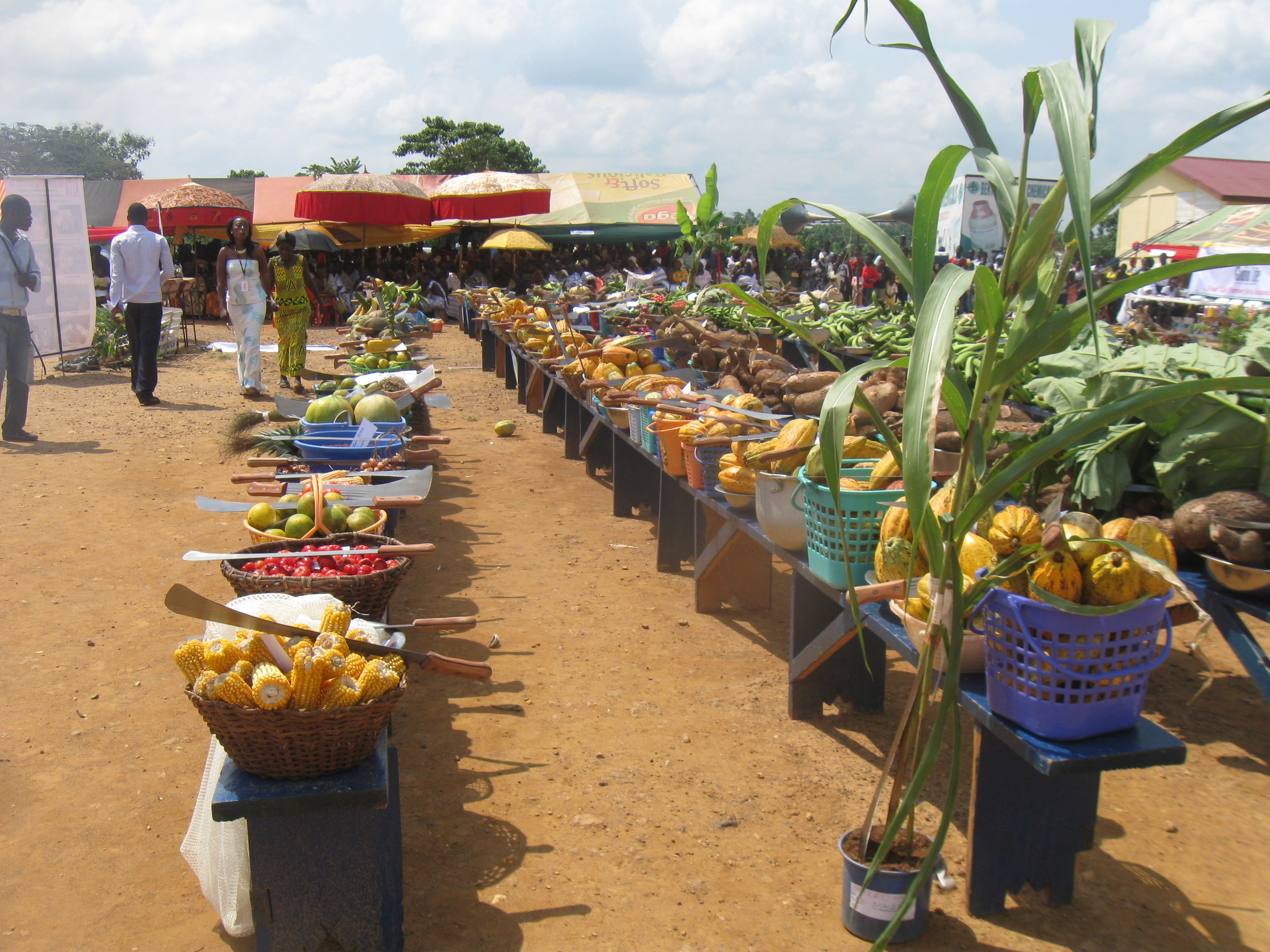
- The 26th National Farmers Day celebration in the Ashanti region, Ghana
- Official name: Farmers' Day
- Also called: Farmers
- Observed by: Various countries
- Date: Varies by country
- Frequency: Annual

Farmers' Day is an annual observance in various countries to celebrate the national contributions of farmers and agricultures. It is observed on different dates around the world.

== List by country ==
=== Afghanistan ===
In Afghanistan, it is observed on March 22 every year as part of the Afghan New Year (Nowruz).

=== Bolivia ===
In Bolivia, Agrarian Revolution Day is celebrated on August 2 to commemorate several events in Bolivian history:

- creation in 1937 of the Ayllu School (now Warisata Teachers High School), the first educational institution for farmers and indigenous people
- establishment also in 1937 of Day of the Indian to recognize the indigenous population of Bolivia
- passing of the Agrarian Reform Law in 1953, which allocated more land to farmers

The holiday was originally known as "Day of the Indian" but was changed in 2007 to its current name of "Agrarian Revolution Day".

=== Chile ===
In Chile, Farmers' Day (Día de las Campesinas y los Campesinos) is celebrated on July 28 to commemorate the passing in 1967 of laws promoting agrarian reform and unionization of farmers. From 1976, the holiday was known as "National Agricultural Worker Day" (Día Nacional del Trabajador Agrícola), changing in 1980 to "National Farmer Day" (Día Nacional del Campesino), finally changing once more in 2015 to its current name of Farmers' Day (Día de las Campesinas y los Campesinos).

=== Ghana ===
The National Farmers' Day in Ghana is an annual celebration of farmers and fishermen, observed on the first Friday of December. On Farmers' Day, the Ministry of Food and Agriculture (Ghana) honors with special awards to deserving farmers and fishermen based on their practices and output.

=== India ===
The National Farmers Day in India is also known as Kisan Divas in Hindi. Farmer's Day is celebrated every year on 23 December, on the birthday of the 5th Prime Minister of India, Choudhary Charan Singh, also a farmer's leader, who introduced many policies to improve the lives of the Indian farmers. It is celebrated by organizing various programs, debates, seminars, quiz competitions, discussions, workshops, exhibitions, essays writing competitions and functions.

=== Pakistan ===
The National Farmers' Day in Pakistan, also known as Kissan Day, was celebrated for the first time in the country's history on 18 December 2019 in Islamabad as was also acknowledged by the Prime Minister Imran Khan. The idea was proposed by Pakistan's leading Fertilizer manufacturing company Fatima Group in favor of promoting farmer welfare and prosperity while celebrating Pakistan's first farmers' day on 18 December 2019 during a special event in Islamabad which was acknowledged and endorsed by the Country's premier.

=== Peru ===
Farmer Day, or Dia del Campesino, is celebrated in Peru on June 24 every year as a tribute to the hardworking local farmers that provide food to the table of every Peruvian. Observers celebrate this day by holding agriculture fairs, cultural displays, and of course, the sharing of food. In the Amazonian region, Farmer Day is also celebrated in tandem with the Feast of San Juan Bautista — or St. John the Baptist Day — as a nod to the Catholic tradition that was instilled by Spanish

=== South Korea ===
In South Korea, the observance is on 11 November. It competes with the Pepero Day on the same day.

=== United States ===
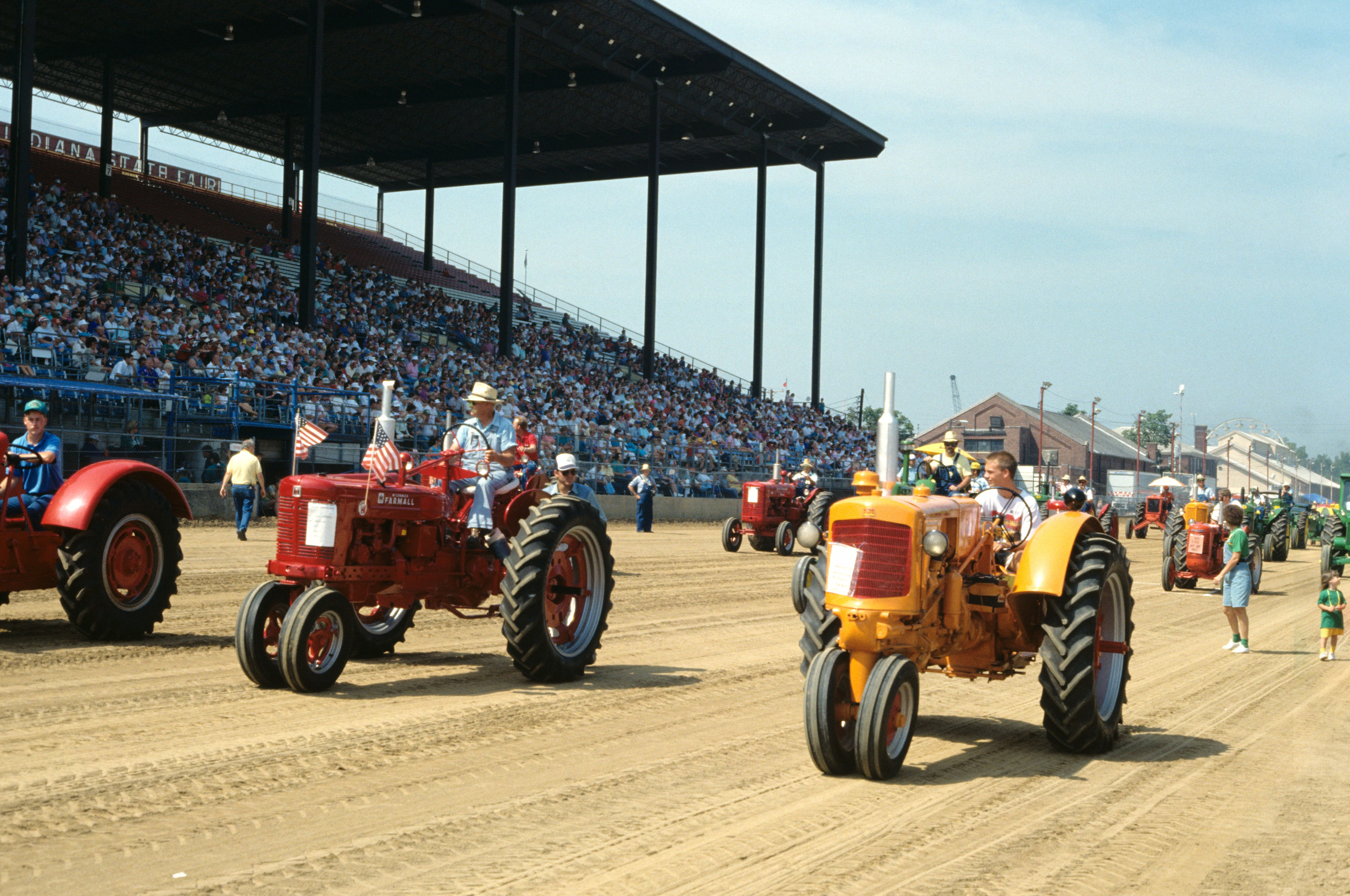
Farmers Day in Indianapolis, Indiana

In America, it is observed on 12 October every year. It is celebrated to pay tribute to all farmers throughout American history.

=== Vietnam ===
In Vietnam, it is observed on 14 October every year as the anniversary of the foundation of Vietnamese Peasants' Society. It was formerly observed on 26 March (the same date as the Youth Day in North (hence, reunified) Vietnam) in South Vietnam from 1971 until 1975 to commemorate Nguyễn Văn Thiệu's passing on Land Reforms Act of 1970.

=== Zambia ===
The National Farmers' Day in Zambia is observed on the first Monday of August.

== See also ==
- World Food Day
