= Constitution Day (Ghana) =

Public holiday in Ghana

- Official name: Constitution Day
- Observed by: Ghana
- Type: National
- Celebrations: Parades, Fireworks, Rallies
- Date: 7 January
- Next time: 7 January 2026
- Frequency: annual

Constitution Day is to commemorate the establishment of a new constitution for the fourth republic of Ghana in January 1993, popularly known as the 1992 Constitution of Ghana. Constitution Day in Ghana is observed on January 7 after the presidential and parliamentary elections. It marks the first day of a new parliament after every election year when the old parliament of Ghana is dissolved at midnight on January 6 after elections.

== History ==
After the first three constitutions were made meaningless by military coups, the fourth constitution was adopted after a referendum held on April 28, 1992, and established on 7 January 1993. This day is thus celebrated each year to celebrate the effort to maintain and sustain the fourth republic over the years and the birthing of the 1992 constitution of Ghana.

== Statutory Holiday ==
Constitution Day is observed in Ghana as a statutory holiday. It also became a holiday after the enactment of the Public Holidays Act of 2001, Section 2 (Act 601) and was first observed as such on 7 January 2019.
