= Independence Day (Ghana) =

National holiday in Ghana

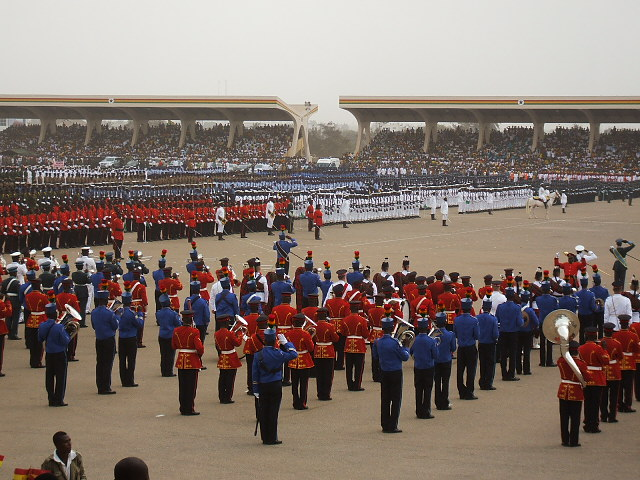
- Ghana's 50th anniversary parade in 2007.
- Also called: National Day
- Observed by: Ghana, Ghanaian diaspora
- Type: National.
- Significance: Independence from British colonial rule in 1957.
- Date: March 6
- Frequency: Annual

The Independence Day of Ghana is a national holiday celebrated yearly. This day is an official state holiday for the citizens of Ghana both within and in the diaspora to honour and celebrate the heroes of Ghana who led the country to attain its independence. Independence Day is celebrated on 6 March every year. Independence Day is also remembrance of the day that marks the declaration of Ghanaian independence from the British colonial rule. The first Prime Minister of Ghana, Kwame Nkrumah, became the Head of Government from 1957 to 1960. On Wednesday, 6 March 1957, Kwame Nkrumah declared to the people of Ghana about their freedom, he added that, "the African People are capable of managing their own affairs and Ghana our beloved country is free forever." Ghana was the first country in sub-Saharan Africa to achieve its independence from European colonial rule. Many Ghanaians who have had the opportunity to serve as president have remembered the occasion and made Ghana Independence Day a public holiday to celebrate. Granting the day as a national holiday recognized that if 6 March of a year fell on a weekend of the Independence Day celebration, the working day that follows, which is a Monday, will be observed as a holiday by the whole nation. Many presidents from other African countries and Europe have been invited to Ghana to join in the celebration either as guest speakers or invited guests, since the reign of former President Kwame Nkrumah till now.

== Background ==
Ghana, formerly known as the Gold Coast, had many natural resources categorized into two as minerals and forest resources. The mineral resources are gold and ivory, bauxite, diamond, and manganese, which meant the Europeans desired the area. There are also food and cash crops. Many controversies arose among European countries as to who should take charge of the Gold Coast due to its rich natural resources. In 1874, the British took control over parts of Gold Coast although the Portuguese were the first to settle at Elmina in the Gold Coast in 1482. After the British took control, the Gold Coast was named the British Gold Coast. After World War II, the British reduced its control over its colonies in Africa, including the Gold Coast. The United Gold Coast convention pioneered the call for independence within the shortest possible time after the Gold Coast legislative election in 1947. Osagyefo in 1952, Dr. Kwame Nkrumah won the election to lead the Gold Coast administration after he won the Gold Coast legislative election in 1951. Led by Kwame Nkrumah and the Convention People's Party (CPP), the Gold Coast declared its independence from the British on Wednesday, 6 March 1957. The Gold Coast was named Ghana.

== Celebration history ==
Year	Theme	Venue
2013	Investing in The Youth For Ghana's Transformation	Independence Square (Accra)
2014	Building a Better and Prosperous Ghana through patriotism and National Unity	Independence Square (Accra)
2015	Achieving Transformation Through National Unity	Independence Square (Accra)
2016	Investing in the Youth for Ghana's Transformation	Independence Square (Accra)
2017	Mobilizing for Ghana's Future	Independence Square (Accra)
2018	Ghana Beyond Aid	Independence Square (Accra)
2019	Celebrating Peace and Unity	Aliu Mahama Stadium (Tamale)
2020	Consolidating our Gain	Baba Yara Sports Stadium (Kumasi)
2021	Working Together, Bouncing Back Together	Jubilee House

Independence Day was celebrated for the first time outside Accra in Tamale and Kumasi. In 1957, the independence celebrations were attended by Martin Luther King Jr., president of the Southern Christian Leadership Conference. The Bagad Lann Bihoue of the French Navy took part in the 60th-anniversary celebrations.

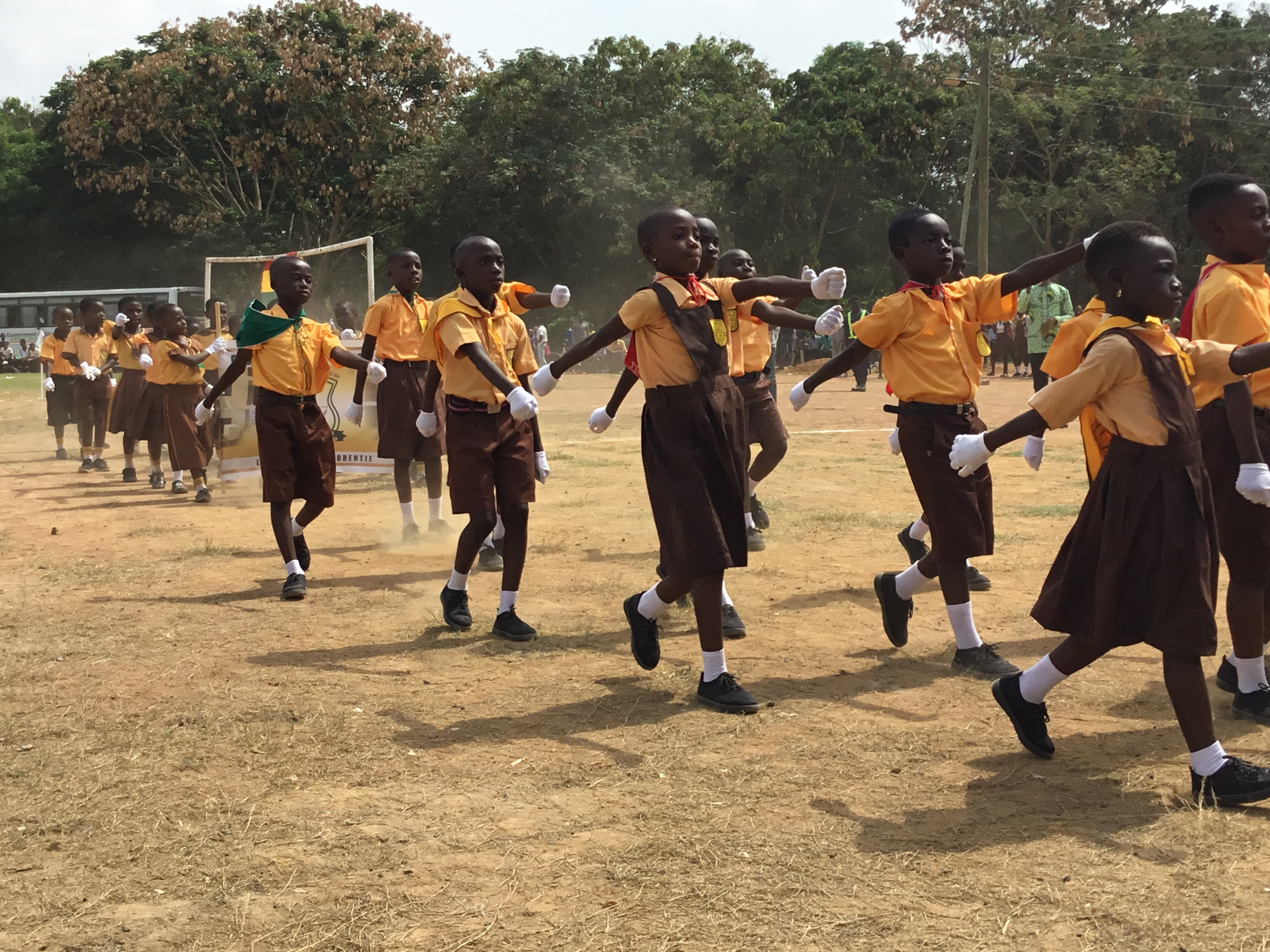
Independence Day marchpast By Pupils

== Parade ==
Black Star Square is a site for Ghana's Independence Day parade, particularly the Trooping of the Colour aspect derived from the British era. A notable parade was the Golden Jubilee (celebrated the 50th anniversary of independence), which was led by President John Kufuor. In 1961, Queen Elizabeth II, who until the year before was the Queen of Ghana, attended the parade as the British sovereign and took part in the inspection tour with President Nkrumah.

== See also ==
- Public holidays in Ghana
- List of national independence days
- Ghana independence history
