= 1995 in Ghana =

- Decades: 1970s; 1980s; 1990s; 2000s; 2010s
- See also: Other events of 1995; Timeline of Ghanaian history

1995 in Ghana details events of note that happened in Ghana in the year 1995.

== Incumbents ==
- President: Jerry John Rawlings
- Vice President: Kow Nkensen Arkaah
- Chief Justice: Philip Edward Archer then Isaac Kobina Abban

== Events ==
=== February ===
22nd - Isaac Kobina Abban was appointed Chief Justice by the President Jerry Rawlings

=== March ===
- 6th - 38th independence anniversary held.

=== July ===
- 1st - Republic day celebrations held across the country.
- 14th - Jerry John Rawlings and the first lady, Nana Konadu Agyeman Rawlings attend CBI conference in London.

=== December ===
- Annual Farmers' Day celebrations held in all regions of the country.
- 7th - Presidential and parliamentary elections held.
- 15th - President Rawlings starts an 11-day visit U.S. to promote investment and trade.

== Births ==
- January 23: Dominic Oduro, footballer
- March 16: Benjamin Fadi, footballer
- August 15: Isaac Donkor, footballer
- September 16: Paul Quaye, Spanish-born footballer

== Deaths ==
- Ephraim Amu, Ghanaian composer, musicologist and teacher (b. 1899)

== National holidays ==
- January 1: New Year's Day
- March 6: Independence Day
- May 1: Labor Day
- December 25: Christmas
- December 26: Boxing Day

In addition, several other places observe local holidays, such as the foundation of their town. These are also "special days."
