= Sallah v. Attorney-General =

1970 court case in Ghana

Attorney-General v. Sallah
- Court: Supreme Court of Ghana
- Full case name: Attorney-General v. Sallah
- Decided: 20 April 1970
- Plaintiff: E. K. Sallah
- Citation: [1970] GLR 55

Court membership
- Judges sitting: Fred Kwasi Apaloo; Johnson Yaw Kusi Bodum Boateng Siriboe; E. N. P. Sowah; Patrick Dankwa Anin; Philip Edward Archer

Case opinions
- Decision by: Archer
- Concurrence: Apaloo; Sowah
- Dissent: Siriboe; Anin

The case of Sallah v Attorney-General popularly known as the Sallah Case is a landmark decision of the Supreme Court of Ghana. The case revolves around the termination of 568 public servants, including Mr. E.K. Sallah, under the new 1969 Constitution, and the subsequent legal challenge that questioned the legality of these dismissals. Similar to the Kulungugu Treason trial, this case was seen as an interference by the Executive branch in the matters of the Judiciary.

In the preliminary case, the core principle established was that allegations of judicial bias cannot be made without substantial evidence. The standard of proof required is grounded in evaluating the balance of evidence, akin to the standards applied in civil cases. Simply knowing a judge does not constitute proof of bias. Clear and convincing evidence must be presented to demonstrate a genuine likelihood of bias.

In the principal case, attention was directed toward the legal implications of a coup d'état. Specifically, the Appeals Court of Ghana, which was serving as the Supreme Court at the time, was tasked with assessing the legal status of appointments and positions following the suspension of the 1960 constitution during the 1966 coup. The ruling underscored the fundamental principles of the rule of law and the independence of the judiciary in protecting the rights and interests of citizens.

== Background ==
On 21 February 1970, a report in the Daily Graphic stated that all public servants in Ghana would remain in their positions unless otherwise notified. This announcement did not apply to those who had already been informed that their services were no longer needed. Among the 568 public servants dismissed was Mr. E. K. Sallah, a manager at the Ghana National Trading Corporation (GNTC). Termination letters signed by Nathan Quao, who was the Secretary to the Presidential Commission at the time, were promptly issued, with the Ghana Air Force assisting in delivering the letters to locations outside Accra.

The government referenced the 1969 Constitution to justify these dismissals, noting that all public service appointments were set to conclude on 21 February 1970, six months after the constitution's enactment. The government highlighted factors such as efficiency, honesty, dedication, and forward-thinking in performance as the basis for not reappointing the 568 officers, who were employees from key institutions like the Bank of Ghana, the Ministry of Trade, the Ghana Commercial Bank, and the GNTC.

Mr. Sallah maintained that his termination was not legally justified. He contended that the law referenced for his dismissal did not pertain to his role at GNTC, as the corporation was not established under the authority of the National Liberation Council. As a result, he sought a court declaration stating that the government was not authorised to terminate his appointment under Section 9(1) of the Constitution's first schedule.

== Conflict ==
The case drew public attention, which was amplified by prime minister Kofi Abrefa Busia's public defence of the dismissals. In a 2 March 1970 interview with the Daily Graphic, Busia acknowledged the dismissed workers' situation but justified the decision as essential for national progress, stating that retaining inefficient workers could impede the country's development.

Sallas' writ of summons and statement of claim requested a declaration that, based on a proper interpretation of section 9(1) of the Constitution, the Government of Ghana was not entitled to terminate his appointment as a manager with the GNTC.

In response, the government argued that section 9(1) effectively terminated the employment of all public servants or provided notice that their services would no longer be required after six months from 22 August 1969. Sallah's legal team contended that such an interpretation would conflict with Article 138 of the Constitution, which safeguards public servants from dismissal or removal without just cause. They further argued that section 9(1) explicitly states "save as otherwise provided in this Constitution" and "as far as is consistent with the provisions of this Constitution", implying that its provisions should align with constitutional protections.

The government's defence in Sallah's case hinged on the argument that the Constitution itself had terminated his appointment. The case was notable not only for the public attention it drew but also for the high-profile legal figures involved, including Joe Reindorf (who would later become Attorney-General) and Nicholas Yaw Boafo Adade, the Attorney-General at the time (who would later become a Justice and acting Chief Justice of the Supreme Court of Ghana).

Fearing the potential consequences of a ruling in Sallah's favour, the government sought to disqualify two judges; Justices Fred Kwasi Apaloo and E. N. P Sowah from the panel, alleging potential bias. The Attorney-General argued that Justice Apaloo was a close friend of Mr. Sallah and that Justice Sowah had a personal interest in the matter as his half-sister's husband was amongst those who had been dismissed by the government. However, the evidence presented was largely dismissed as unreliable, with witnesses being described by the court as dishonest.

Despite these allegations, the majority of the judges empaneled for the preliminary case; Justices Austin Amissah (who read the majority decision), Annie Jiagge, Patrick Dankwa Anin, and Philip Edward Archer—decided that the two judges could continue to hear the case. Justice Johnson Boateng Siriboe, however, dissented, believing that their involvement could create a perception of bias.

== Verdict/Decision ==
The court delivered a judgment on 20 April 1970. In the final judgment, the court ruled in favour of Mr. Sallah, declaring that his termination was unlawful since his position did not fall under Section 9(1) of the transitional provisions of the Constitution. Sallah's claim was upheld by Apaloo, Sowah and Archer, while Anin dissented. Justice Archer, representing the majority opinion, observed that it seemed unreasonable for the Constitution, which was enacted as a result of the revolution led by the army and police, to subsequently dismiss all members of those forces. Such an interpretation would imply that not only the military and police but also doctors, nurses, locomotive drivers, firefighters, teachers, sanitary workers, and all other public service employees were dismissed, which is an implausible conclusion. The government was ordered to pay costs of NC300. Justice Siriboe, who had earlier dissented from the majority's decision to allow Justices Apaloo and Sowah to continue, withdrew from the panel before the final judgement was delivered.

== Aftermath ==
Prime Minister Busia responded to the ruling with a televised speech, stating that:

"No court can enforce any decision that seeks to compel the government to employ or re-employ anyone. That will be a futile exercise and I wish to make that perfectly clear."

The Attorney-General, Mr. Adade later dismissed the judgment as "valueless" due to the absence of a fifth judge on the panel. The then Acting Chief Justice Samuel Azu Crabbe, however, maintained that the panel was properly constituted.

The case ultimately marked a significant victory for Mr. Sallah and his legal team. However, it was believed that the ruling had exposed and deepened the rift between Ghana's judiciary and executive branches. Despite calls for reconciliation, the acting Chief Justice, Justice Azu Crabbe, firmly stated that the judiciary had no quarrel with the executive.

While some considered the Prime Minister's comments as an apparent disregard for the 1969 Constitution, others demonstrated in support of the Government. During the demonstration, Busia addressed his supporters and publicly criticized the judiciary. In response, the acting Chief Justice granted an exclusive interview to the Daily Graphic to clarify the judiciary's stance on the issue. In reaction to Busia's remarks, Dr. K. K. Agama, the Leader of the Opposition, reminded the Prime Minister that he lacked the authority to dismiss judges and condemned the government's deliberate effort to erode public confidence in the judiciary by questioning its integrity. The Ghana Bar Association reaffirmed its trust in the judiciary and urged the government to avoid actions that would further hinder the judiciary's work.

After the overthrow of the Busia government in 1972, the new regime cited the Executive branch's interference in judicial matters, particularly following the Sallah case, as one of the key grievances justifying the coup d'état.

== See also ==
- Landmark Decisions of the Supreme Court of Ghana
- History of Ghana (1966–1979)
