= 2019 in Ghana =

- Decades: 1990s; 2000s; 2010s; 2020s
- See also: Other events of 2019; Timeline of Ghanaian history

Events of 2019 in Ghana.

== Incumbents ==
- President: Nana Akufo-Addo
- Vice President: Mahamudu Bawumia
- Chief Justice: Sophia Akuffo (until December 20)

== Events ==
- 7 April – Ghanaian pro wrestler Kofi Kingston wins the WWE Championship at WrestleMania 35.

== Deaths ==
- 19 June – Etika, Ghanaian-American YouTuber and son of Owuraku Amofah
