= 2020 in Ghana =

- Decades: 2000s; 2010s; 2020s
- See also: Other events of 2020; Timeline of Ghanaian history

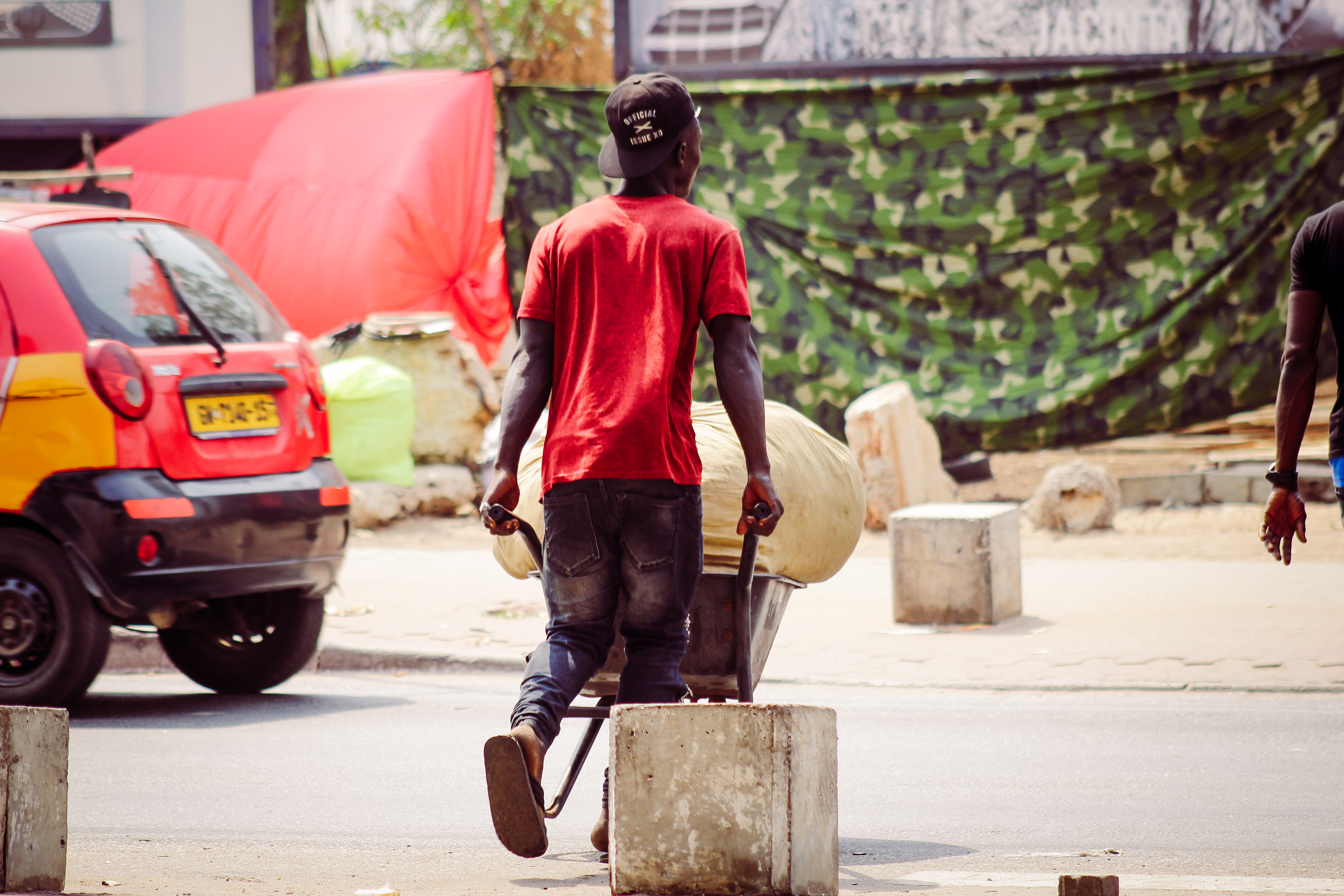

Events of 2020 in Ghana.

== Incumbents ==
- President: Nana Akufo-Addo
- Vice President: Mahamudu Bawumia

== Events ==
- March 4 – Creation of OmniBSIC Bank Ghana Limited.
- December 7 – 2020 Ghanaian general election: won by Nana Akufo-Addo with 51.59% of the vote.
- December 29 – The National Democratic Congress (NDC) says it will contest the December 7 election result.

== Deaths ==
- April 10 – Jacob Plange-Rhule, 62, Rector of the Ghana College of Physicians and Surgeons (since 2015); COVID-19
- October 1 – Ray Styles, 31, pencil artist; liver cancer.
- October 1 – Yakubu Moro, football executive, founder of Berekum Arsenal; stroke.
- October 24 – Stephen Owusu, 37, footballer (Heart of Lions, Aduana Stars, national team).
- November 12 – Jerry Rawlings, 73, politician, President of Ghana (1979, 1981–2001); COVID-19.
- November 23 – Imoro Andani, royal, Northern Regional minister.

== See also ==
- 2020 in West Africa
- COVID-19 pandemic in Ghana
- COVID-19 pandemic in Africa
