= 2018 in Ghana =

- Decades: 1990s; 2000s; 2010s; 2020s
- See also: Other events of 2018; Timeline of Ghanaian history

Events in the year 2018 in Ghana.

== Incumbents ==
- President Nana Akufo-Addo
- Vice President: Mahamudu Bawumia
- Chief Justice: Sophia Akuffo

== Events ==
=== Undated ===
- Gladys Amoah is appointed the Managing Director of Unilever Ghana.

== Deaths ==
- 18 August - Kofi Annan, seventh Secretary-General of the United Nations
