= 2001 in Ghana =

- Decades: 1980s; 1990s; 2000s; 2010s; 2020s
- See also: Other events of 2001; Timeline of Ghanaian history

2001 in Ghana details events of note that happened in Ghana in the year 2001.

== Incumbents ==
- President: John Kufuor
- Vice President: John Atta Mills (until 7 January) Aliu Mahama
- Chief Justice: Isaac Kobina Abban (until 21 April) Edward Kwame Wiredu

== Events ==
=== January ===
- 7th - John Kufuor inaugurated as President of Ghana. Kufuor had won the 2000 Presidential elections.

=== March ===
- 6 March - 44th independence anniversary is held

=== May ===
- 9th - 126 football supporters die at the Accra Sports Stadium.

=== June ===
- President Kufour abolishes the celebration of the June 4th revolution anniversary.

=== July ===
- 1st - Republic day celebrations held.

=== December ===
- Annual Farmers' Day celebrations held across the country.

== National holidays ==
Holidays in italics are "special days", while those in regular type are "regular holidays".

- January 1: New Year's Day
- March 6: Independence Day
- May 1: Labor Day
- December 25: Christmas
- December 26: Boxing Day

In addition, several other places observe local holidays, such as the foundation of their town. These are also "special days."
