= 2017 in Ghana =

- Decades: 1990s; 2000s; 2010s; 2020s
- See also: Other events of 2017; Timeline of Ghanaian history

Events in the year 2017 in Ghana.

== Incumbents ==
- President: John Dramani Mahama (until 7 January); Nana Akufo-Addo (from 7 January)
- Vice President: Kwesi Amissah-Arthur (until 7 January); Mahamudu Bawumia (from 7 January)
- Chief Justice: Georgina Wood (until 8 June), Sophia Akuffo (starting 19 June)

== Events ==
- 7 January – Nana Akufo-Addo took over as president.
- May - Kwesi Nyantakyi appointed Confederation of African Football Vice President

== Deaths ==
- 12 February – Sam Arday, footballer (b. 1945).
