= 1993 in Ghana =

- Decades: 1970s; 1980s; 1990s; 2000s; 2010s
- See also: Other events of 1993; Timeline of Ghanaian history

1993 in Ghana details events of note that happened in Ghana in the year 1993.

== Incumbents ==
- President: Jerry John Rawlings
- Vice President: Kow Nkensen Arkaah
- Chief Justice: Philip Edward Archer

== Events ==
=== January ===
- 7th - Jerry Rawlings sworn in as President of Ghana.
- 7th - Inauguration of Ghana's Fourth Republic.

=== February ===
- 15th - some members of the opposition New Patriotic Party (NPP) are arrested for demonstrating against the national budget.

=== March ===
- 6th - 37th independence anniversary held.
- 22nd - first nonpartisan district level elections held in 13 districts.
- 22nd - 35 cabinet ministers sworn into office.

=== April ===
- 29th - State opening of Parliament.

=== June ===
- 4 - 4 June Revolution anniversary commemorated.

=== July ===
- 1st - Republic day celebrations held across the country.
- 17th - 12 men executed for armed robbery.
- 22nd - the New Patriotic Party (NPP) wins 3 major cases at the Supreme Court.

=== September ===
- - Voter registration starts across the country.

=== December ===
- Annual Farmers' Day celebrations held in all regions of the country.

== Deaths ==
Dasrameti Dblack Gh.

== National holidays ==
- 1 January: New Year's Day
- 6 March: Independence Day
- 1 May: Labor Day
- 25 December: Christmas
- 26 December: Boxing Day

In addition, several other places observe local holidays, such as the foundation of their town. These are also "special days."
