= 2006 in Ghana =

- Decades: 1980s; 1990s; 2000s; 2010s; 2020s
- See also: Other events of 2006; Timeline of Ghanaian history

2006 in Ghana details events of note that happened in Ghana in the year 2006.

== Incumbents ==
- President: John Kufuor
- Vice President: Aliu Mahama
- Chief Justice: George Kingsley Acquah

== Events ==
=== January ===
- 23rd - Archbishop Peter Derry is appointed Cardinal by The Vatican at age 88

=== March ===
- 6 March - 49th independence anniversary
- 25th - Otumfuo Osei-Tutu II inducted Chancellor of Kwame Nkrumah University of Science and Technology (KNUST).
- 29th - Ghana experiences solar eclipse

=== June ===
- June - The national football team the Black Stars play in the 2006 FIFA World Cup

=== December ===
- 21st - NDC holds delegates' congress, John Atta Mills emerges presidential candidate for the third time

=== Date unknown ===
- Emmanuel Arthur, a Ghanaian journalist is awarded the Ghana Journalists Association Television News Reporter of the year.

== National holidays ==
Holidays in italics are "special days", while those in regular type are "regular holidays".

- January 1: New Year's Day
- March 6: Independence Day
- May 1: Labor Day
- December 25: Christmas
- December 26: Boxing Day

In addition, several other places observe local holidays, such as the foundation of their town. These are also "special days."
