= 1998 in Ghana =

- Decades: 1970s; 1980s; 1990s; 2000s; 2010s
- See also: Other events of 1998; Timeline of Ghanaian history

1998 in Ghana details events of note that happened in Ghana in 1998.

== Incumbents ==
- President: Jerry John Rawlings
- Vice President: John Atta Mills
- Chief Justice: Isaac Kobina Abban

== Events ==
=== March ===
- 6 - 41st independence anniversary
- 23 - President Bill Clinton visits Ghana

=== July ===
- 1 - Republic day celebrations held across the country.

=== December ===
- Annual Farmers' Day celebrations held in all regions of the country.

== Deaths ==
- 23 January - Former president Hilla Limann dies after an illness.

== National holidays ==
- January 1: New Year's Day
- March 6: Independence Day
- May 1: Labor Day
- December 25: Christmas
- December 26: Boxing Day

In addition, several other places observe local holidays, such as the foundation of their town. These are also special days.
