= 1994 in Ghana =

- Decades: 1970s; 1980s; 1990s; 2000s; 2010s
- See also: Other events of 1994; Timeline of Ghanaian history

1994 in Ghana details events of note that happened in Ghana in the year 1994.

== Incumbents ==
- President: Jerry John Rawlings
- Vice President: Kow Nkensen Arkaah
- Chief Justice: Philip Edward Archer

== Events ==
=== February ===
- 3rd - ethnic violence erupts between Konkomba and Nanumba tribal groups. The two groups are in the Northern region.

=== March ===
- 6th - 38th independence anniversary held.

=== July ===
- 1st - Republic day celebrations held across the country.
- Emmanuel Aboki Essien of the Grand Orange Lodge of Ghana becomes the first African and French-speaking Imperial Grand President of the Orange Order.

=== August ===
- - President Jerry Rawlings, becomes chairman of the Economic Community of West African States (ECOWAS).

=== December ===
- Annual Farmers' Day celebrations held in all regions of the country.

== National holidays ==
- January 1: New Year's Day
- March 6: Independence Day
- May 1: Labor Day
- December 25: Christmas
- December 26: Boxing Day

In addition, several other places observe local holidays, such as the foundation of their town. These are also "special days."
