= 1997 in Ghana =

- Decades: 1970s; 1980s; 1990s; 2000s; 2010s
- See also: Other events of 1997; Timeline of Ghanaian history

1997 in Ghana details events of note that happened in Ghana in the year 1997.

== Incumbents ==
- President: Jerry John Rawlings
- Vice President: Kow Nkensen Arkaah (until 7 January) John Atta Mills
- Chief Justice: Isaac Kobina Abban

== Events ==
=== January ===
- 7 January - John Atta Mills is sworn in as Vice President of Ghana.

=== March ===
- 6 March - 40th independence anniversary held.

=== July ===
- 1 July - Republic day celebrations held across the country.

=== October ===
- 3 October - Ghana Bar Association (GBA) re-elects Mr. Sam Okudzeto as its national president at a conference in Ho in the Volta region.
- 8 October - Ghana marks World Disaster Day.

=== December ===
- Annual Farmers' Day celebrations held in all regions of the country.

== Deaths ==
- 17 January - Susanna Al-Hassan, politician and writer, Ghana's first female parliamentary minister (born 1927)
- 30 November - Shamo Quaye, footballer (born 1971)

== National holidays ==
- January 1: New Year's Day
- March 6: Independence Day
- May 1: Labor Day
- December 25: Christmas
- December 26: Boxing Day

In addition, several other places observe local holidays, such as the foundation of their town. These are also "special days."
