= 2000 in Ghana =

- Decades: 1980s; 1990s; 2000s; 2010s; 2020s
- See also: Other events of 2000; Timeline of Ghanaian history

The following lists events that happened during 2000 in Ghana.

== Incumbents ==
- President: Jerry John Rawlings
- Vice President: John Atta Mills
- Chief Justice: Isaac Kobina Abban

== Events ==
=== March ===
- 6 March - 43rd independence anniversary.

=== July ===
- 1 July - Republic day celebrations held across the country.

=== December ===
- Annual farmers' day celebrations held.
- 7 December - Presidential elections held in Ghana.

== National holidays ==
Holidays in italics are "special days", while those in regular type are "regular holidays".

- January 1: New Year's Day
- March 6: Independence Day
- May 1: Labor Day
- December 25: Christmas
- December 26: Boxing Day

In addition, several other places observe local holidays, such as the foundation of their town. These are also "special days."
