= 2011 in Ghana =

- Decades: 1990s; 2000s; 2010s; 2020s
- See also: Other events of 2011; Timeline of Ghanaian history

2011 in Ghana details events of note that happened in Ghana in the year 2011.

== Incumbents ==
- President: John Atta Mills
- Vice President: John Dramani Mahama
- Chief Justice: Georgina Theodora Wood
- Speaker of Parliament: Joyce Bamford-Addo

== Events ==
=== January ===
- Ghana sells first oil to Exxon.

=== February ===
- 28 February: Nominations NPP parliamentary primaries open.

=== March ===
- 6 March: Nominations for NPP parliamentary primaries closed.

=== April ===
- 30 April: NPP parliamentary primaries are held in 220 constituency across the country.

=== May ===
- 2 May: Nana Konadu Agyeman Rawlings former first lady of Ghana, becomes first person to pick up a form to seek the presidential nomination of the ruling party (NDC).
- 5 May: John Atta Mills president of Ghana picked up his nomination form to seek for re-election as leader of the NDC.
- 10 May: Dr Ekwow Spio-Garbrah, CEO of the Commonwealth Telecommunications Organisation (CTO), picks up nomination forms to contest for the leadership of the NDC.
- 31 May: President John Atta Mills submits form to NDC executives, to contest the 2011 National Democratic Congress presidential primaries

=== June ===
- 1 June: Nana Konadu Agyeman Rawlings former first lady of Ghana, submits her forms to the NDC executives becoming the second candidate to contest the 2011 National Democratic Congress presidential primaries
- 3 June: The Ghana national football team, the Black Stars, beat their Congolese counterparts by 3 goals to 1. Goals scored by Isaac Vorsah, Prince Tagoe and Agyeman Badu.
- 4 June: June 4 revolution commemorated in Accra.

=== July ===
- 8 July: President John Atta Mills is elected by the NDC as it flagbearer for the 2012 presidential elections.

== National holidays ==
Holidays in italics are "special days", while those in regular type are "regular holidays".

- January 1: New Year's Day
- March 6: Independence Day
- April 22 Good Friday
- May 1: Labor Day
- December 25: Christmas
- December 26: Boxing Day

In addition, several other places observe local holidays, such as the foundation of their town. These are also "special days."

== Deaths ==
- 23 July: Larry Bimi - Chairman of the NCCE
