= 1999 in Ghana =

- Decades: 1970s; 1980s; 1990s; 2000s; 2010s
- See also: Other events of 1999; Timeline of Ghanaian history

1999 in Ghana details events of note that happened in Ghana in the year 1999.

== Incumbents ==
- President: Jerry John Rawlings
- Vice President: John Atta Mills
- Chief Justice: Isaac Kobina Abban

== Events ==
=== March ===
- 6 March - 42nd independence anniversary
- 15 March - President Rawlings attends a state dinner held in his honour by U.S. President Bill Clinton.

=== July ===
- 1st - Republic day celebrations held across the country.

=== August ===
- 14th - President Jerry Rawlings attends the burial service for the late Okyenhene, Osagyefo Kuntunkununku II at Kibi.

== Deaths ==
- 22 April - Former vice-president Joseph W.S. de Graft-Johnson dies in London after a short illness.

== National holidays ==
- January 1: New Year's Day
- March 6: Independence Day
- May 1: Labor Day
- December 25: Christmas
- December 26: Boxing Day

In addition, several other places observe local holidays, such as the foundation of their town. These are also "special days."
