= Henry K. Prempeh =

Ghanaian judge (1912-1997)

Henry Kwasi Prempeh

Justice of the Supreme Court of Ghana
- In office 1971–1972
- Appointed by: Kofi Abrefa Busia

High Court Judge
- In office 1960–1964
- Appointed by: Kwame Nkrumah
- Preceded by: Position established

Personal details
- Born: Henry Kwasi Prempeh; 27 March 1912 Gold Coast
- Died: Ghana
- Parent: Prempeh I-- may be used (optionally with mother parameter) in place of parents parameter (displays "Parent(s)" as label) --> (father)
- Education: Adisadel College; King's College London
- Profession: Judge

Henry Kwasi Prempeh (born 27 March 1912, date of death 1997) was a Ghanaian judge. He was a justice of the Supreme Court of Ghana from 1971 to 1972.

== Early life and education ==
Prempeh was born on 27 March 1912 to King Prempeh I, the 13th Asantehene or king of the Ashanti (Ruler of the Asante) in the Colony of the Seychelles. He began his early education at King's College, Seychelles before moving to St. Cyprians School, Kumasi after his father was repatriated. Prempeh was 14 years old when his father, Prempeh I, was allowed to return to his homeland of Asante (Ashanti) after 28 years of exile in the Seychelles Island. He had his secondary education at Adisadel College and his tertiary education at King's College London.

== Career ==
Prempeh was a registrar of the Asantehene court prior to entering King's College London in 1946 to study law. He was awarded his Bachelor of Laws (LLB) degree in 1949. He entered private legal practice in Kumasi, and served as the president of the Ashanti Bar Association in 1957. In 1960, he was appointed a judge of the High Court of Ghana. He served on the High Court bench until 1964 when his appointment was revoked by the then president, Kwame Nkrumah with no reason given. He then returned to private practice after the revocation of his appointment. In 1971, he was appointed to the Supreme Court bench together with Samuel Azu Crabbe and Fred Kwasi Apaloo. He served in this capacity until 1972 when the Supreme Court was temporarily abolished by the then ruling military government, the National Redemption Council (NRC).

== Personal life ==
His hobbies included walking, playing golf and gardening.

== See also ==
- List of judges of the Supreme Court of Ghana
- Supreme Court of Ghana
