= 1990 in Ghana =

- Decades: 1970s; 1980s; 1990s; 2000s; 2010s
- See also: Other events of 1990; Timeline of Ghanaian history

1990 in Ghana details events of note that happened in Ghana in the year 1990.

== Incumbents ==
- President: Jerry John Rawlings
- Chief Justice: E. N. P. Sowah

== Events ==
1990: Jerry Rawlings forms the National Commission for Democracy.

- Organizations call for the military government to hand over governance to a civilian government and multiparty politics.
- 6 March - 33rd independence anniversary held.
- 1 July - Republic day celebrations held across the country.
- August - Movement for Freedom and Justice is formed to press the military government to hand over to civilian rule.
- National Commission for Democracy (NCD) is tasked with building up more effective programme for the realization of civilian rule.
- National Commission for Democracy, is asked by the PNDC to organise forums in all the 10 regions to seek Ghanaians views on what they want from government. The views obtained showed that Ghanaians wanted multi-party system of government.

== National holidays ==
- January 1: New Year's Day
- March 6: Independence Day
- May 1: Labor Day
- December 25: Christmas
- December 26: Boxing Day

In addition, several other places observe local holidays, such as the foundation of their town. These are also "special days."
