= 1991 in Ghana =

- Decades: 1970s; 1980s; 1990s; 2000s; 2010s
- See also: Other events of 1991; Timeline of Ghanaian history

1991 in Ghana details events of note that happened in Ghana in the year 1991.

== Incumbents ==
- President: Jerry John Rawlings
- Chief Justice: Philip Edward Archer

== Events ==
=== March ===
- 6th - 34th independence anniversary held.

=== May ===
- - Provisional National Defence Council (PNDC) announces its acceptance of multi-party system in Ghana.

=== July ===
- 1st - Republic day celebrations held across the country.

=== December ===
- Annual Farmers' Day celebrations held in all regions of the country.

== National holidays ==
- January 1: New Year's Day
- March 6: Independence Day
- May 1: Labor Day
- December 25: Christmas
- December 26: Boxing Day

In addition, several other places observe local holidays, such as the foundation of their town. These are also "special days."
