= 2007 in Ghana =

- Decades: 1980s; 1990s; 2000s; 2010s; 2020s
- See also: Other events of 2007; Timeline of Ghanaian history

2007 in Ghana details events of note that happened in Ghana in that year.

== Incumbents ==
- President: John Kufuor
- Vice President: Aliu Mahama
- Chief Justice: George Kingsley Acquah (until 25 March), Georgina Theodora Wood (starting 25 March)

== Events ==
=== January ===
- 29th - President John Kufuor becomes chairman of the African Union.

=== March ===
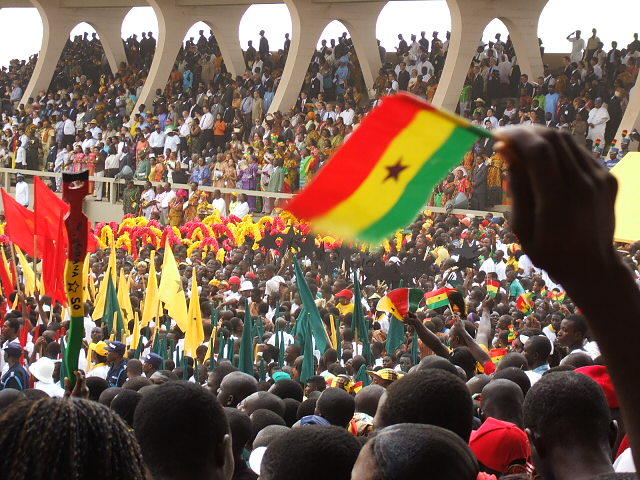

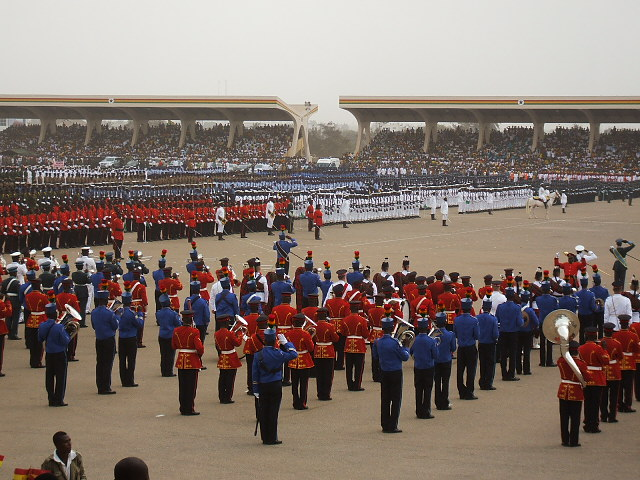

- 6 March - Celebrations mark 50 years of Ghana's independence from the United Kingdom. A military parade took place on Black Star Square in Accara.

=== June ===
- 6 June - Ghana discovers oil in commercial quantities.

=== July ===
1 July - The Bank of Ghana starts circulating the new currency the Ghana cedi.

=== December ===
- 22 December - President Kufuor declares Ghana's oil reserves total 3 billion barrels (480,000,000 m^{3}).

== National holidays ==
Holidays in italics are "special days", while those in regular type are "regular holidays".

- January 1: New Year's Day
- March 6: Independence Day
- May 1: Labor Day
- December 25: Christmas
- December 26: Boxing Day

In addition, several other places observe local holidays, such as the foundation of their town. These are also "special days."
