= 2002 in Ghana =

- Decades: 1980s; 1990s; 2000s; 2010s; 2020s
- See also: Other events of 2002; Timeline of Ghanaian history

2002 in Ghana details events of note that happened in Ghana in the year 2002.

== Incumbents ==
- President: John Kufuor
- Vice President: Aliu Mahama
- Chief Justice: Edward Kwame Wiredu

== Events ==
=== January ===
- Annual New Year school held in University of Ghana, Legon, Accra.

=== March ===
- 6 March - 45th independence anniversary

March - District Assembly elections held.

=== May ===
- 1st - Workers' Day celebrations held.

=== July ===
- 1st - Republic Day

=== October ===
- 31st - President John Kufuor makes an eight-day official visit to China.

=== December ===
- National Best Farmer Celebrations held

== National holidays ==
Holidays in italics are "special days", while those in regular type are "regular holidays".

- January 1: New Year's Day
- March 6: Independence Day
- May 1: Labor Day
- December 25: Christmas
- December 26: Boxing Day

In addition, several other places observe local holidays, such as the foundation of their town. These are also "special days."
