= 2005 in Ghana =

- Decades: 1980s; 1990s; 2000s; 2010s; 2020s
- See also: Other events of 2005; Timeline of Ghanaian history

2005 in Ghana details events of note that happened in Ghana in the year 2005.

== Incumbents ==
- President: John Kufuor
- Vice President: Aliu Mahama
- Chief Justice: George Kingsley Acquah

== Events ==
=== January ===
- 7th - President Kufuor as president of Ghana, for the second time after the 2004 elections.
- 9th- Hearts of oak defeats their arch rivals kotoko in Kumasi to win the maiden confederation cup. The defeat led to enormous pain in the kotoko fraternity.

=== March ===
- 6 March - 48th independence anniversary

== National holidays ==
Holidays in italics are "special days", while those in regular type are "regular holidays".

- January 1: New Year's Day
- March 6: Independence Day
- May 1: Labor Day
- December 25: Christmas
- December 26: Boxing Day

In addition, several other places observe local holidays, such as the foundation of their town. These are also "special days."
