= 2013 in Ghana =

- Decades: 1990s; 2000s; 2010s; 2020s
- See also: Other events of 2013; Timeline of Ghanaian history

2013 in Ghana details events of note that has been predicted to happen in the Ghana in the year 2013.

== Incumbents ==
- President: John Dramani Mahama
- Vice President: Kwesi Amissah-Arthur
- Chief Justice: Georgina Wood
- Speaker of Parliament: Joyce Bamford-Addo (until January 6); Edward Doe Adjaho (after January 6)

== Events ==
=== January ===
- January 24 - The first Data Innovation Day, a day designed to raise awareness on how increased use of information can benefit individuals from the public and private sector, takes place.
- January 29 - President Mahama orders an investigation of a seizure of $80 million in gold at a Turkish airport. The gold was meant to be transported to Iran.

=== February ===
- February 4 - President Mahama defends his Minister of State, saying that he is still able to perform his duties despite his visual impairment.
- February 12 - Law lecturer Moses Foh-Amoaning promises that he will reform gay advocate Andrew Solomon, through Christian prayers and cogent arguments.

=== March ===
- March 4, Rlg Communications cut sword for the construction of Hope City.
- March 6, 56th Interdependence Day Anniversary

=== August ===
- August 29, Election petition verdict.

=== September ===
- September 21:Founder's Day (Ghana)

== National holidays ==
Holidays in italics are "special days", while those in regular type are "regular holidays".

- January 1: New Year's Day
- March 6: Independence Day
- April 22 Good Friday
- May 1: Labor Day
- September 21:Founder's Day
- December 25: Christmas
- December 26: Boxing Day

In addition, several other places observe local holidays, such as the foundation of their town. These are also "special days."
