= 1992 in Ghana =

- Decades: 1970s; 1980s; 1990s; 2000s; 2010s
- See also: Other events of 1992; Timeline of Ghanaian history

1992 in Ghana details events of note that happened in Ghana in the year 1992.

== Incumbents ==
- President: Jerry John Rawlings
- Chief Justice: Philip Edward Archer

== Events ==
=== March ===
- 6th - 35th independence anniversary held.

=== April ===
- 28th - final draft constitution of Ghana is unanimously approved in a referendum.

=== May ===
- 8th - Jerry Rawlings Chairman of the Provisional National Defence Council (PNDC) accepts oaths to be sworn by government officials.
- 18th - Ban on political party activities lifted.

=== July ===
- 1st - Republic day celebrations held across the country.

=== November ===
- 3rd - Presidential elections held across the country.

=== December ===
- Annual Farmers' Day celebrations held in all regions of the country.
- 29th - parliamentary elections held.

== Births ==
- 1 January: Daniel Kofi Agyei, footballer
- 5 January: Afriyie Acquah, footballer
- 10 January: Christian Atsu, footballer
- 11 July: Joseph Baffo, footballer
- 1 December: Masahudu Alhassan, footballer
- 19 December: Bright Addae, footballer

== National holidays ==
- 1 January: New Year's Day
- 6 March: Independence Day
- 1 May: Labor Day
- 25 December: Christmas
- 26 December: Boxing Day

In addition, several other places observe local holidays, such as the foundation of their town. These are also "special days."
