= 2014 in Ghana =

- Decades: 1990s; 2000s; 2010s; 2020s
- See also: Other events of 2014; Timeline of Ghanaian history

2014 in Ghana details events of note that has been predicted to happen in the Ghana in the year 2014.

== Incumbents ==
- President: John Dramani Mahama
- Vice President: Kwesi Amissah-Arthur
- Chief Justice: Georgina Wood
- Speaker of Parliament: Edward Adjaho

== Events ==
=== February ===
- February 1, National Petroleum Authority increase fuel prices. Petrol is increased by 3 percent, kerosene is increased by 1.24and diesel by 3.31 percent.
- February 4, First Capital Plus Bank is named headline sponsor of the Ghana Premier League.

=== March ===
- March 6, Independence Day.

=== July ===
Castro (Ghanaian Musician) dies 6 July 2014

== National holidays ==
Holidays in italics are "special days", while those in regular type are "regular holidays".

- January 1: New Year's Day
- March 6: Independence Day
- April 22 Good Friday
- May 1: Labor Day
- May 25: Africa Day
- July 1: Republic Day
- September 22: Founder's Day (Ghana)
- December 5: Farmers Day
- December 25: Christmas
- December 26: Boxing Day

In addition, several other places observe local holidays, such as the foundation of their town. These are also "special days."
