= 2003 in Ghana =

- Decades: 1980s; 1990s; 2000s; 2010s; 2020s
- See also: Other events of 2003; Timeline of Ghanaian history

2003 in Ghana details events of note that happened in Ghana in the year 2003.

== Incumbents ==
- President: John Kufuor
- Vice President: Aliu Mahama
- Chief Justice: Edward Kwame Wiredu (until 4 July), George Kingsley Acquah

== Events ==
=== March ===
- 6 March - 46th independence anniversary

=== December ===
- 5th - National Farmers' Day celebration held in Takoradi, the capital of the Western region.
- 19th - President John Kufuor re-elected Chairman of the Economic Community of West African States (ECOWAS).

== National holidays ==
Holidays in italics are "special days", while those in regular type are "regular holidays".

- January 1: New Year's Day
- March 6: Independence Day
- May 1: Labor Day
- December 25: Christmas
- December 26: Boxing Day

In addition, several other places observe local holidays, such as the foundation of their town.
