= 2015 in Ghana =

- Decades: 1990s; 2000s; 2010s; 2020s
- See also: Other events of 2015; Timeline of Ghanaian history

2015 in Ghana lists events of note that happened in the Ghana in the year 2015.

== Incumbents ==
- President: John Dramani Mahama
- Vice President: Kwesi Amissah-Arthur
- Chief Justice: Georgina Wood

== Events ==
=== June ===
- June 3–11 people are killed in a fire at a filling station in Accra.
- June 4 - An explosion happens in Accra, killing 78 people.

=== July ===
- July 7 - Talensi by-election - Following Robert Nachinab Doameng (NPP) becoming the Paramount Chief of Tongo, a by-election was held resulting in Benson Tongo Baba of the NDC being elected MP for Talensi with a margin of 3521.

== Deaths ==
- 19 April - Theodosia Okoh, 92, flag designer and sports administrator
- 12 May - Cecil Jones Attuquayefio, 70, football player and coach
- 2 September - Charles Gyamfi, 85, football player (Fortuna Düsseldorf) and coach (national team)

== National holidays ==
Holidays in italics are "special days", while those in regular type are "regular holidays".

- January 1: New Year's Day
- March 6: Independence Day
- April 22 Good Friday
- May 1: Labor Day
- December 4: Farmers day
- December 25: Christmas
- December 26: Boxing Day

In addition, several other places observe local holidays, such as the foundation of their town. These are also "special days."
