= 2010 in Ghana =

- Decades: 1990s; 2000s; 2010s; 2020s
- See also: Other events of 2010; Timeline of Ghanaian history

Events in the year 2010 in Ghana.

== Incumbents ==
- President: John Atta Mills
- Vice President: John Dramani Mahama
- Chief Justice: Georgina Theodora Wood
- Speaker of Parliament: Joyce Bamford-Addo

== Events ==
=== December ===
15 December - John Atta Mills, President of Ghana commissions production of the country's oil and gas for export.

== National holidays ==
Holidays in italics are "special days", while those in regular type are "regular holidays".

- January 1: New Year's Day
- March 6: Independence Day
- May 1: Labor Day
- December 25: Christmas
- December 26: Boxing Day

In addition, several other places observe local holidays, such as the foundation of their town. These are also "special days."
