= 2004 in Ghana =

- Decades: 1980s; 1990s; 2000s; 2010s; 2020s
- See also: Other events of 2004; Timeline of Ghanaian history

2004 in Ghana details events of note that happened in Ghana in the year 2004.

== Incumbents ==
- President: John Kufuor
- Vice President: Aliu Mahama
- Chief Justice: George Kingsley Acquah

== Events ==
=== March ===
- 6 March - 47th independence anniversary
- 18 March - President John Kufuor launches National Health Insurance Scheme.

=== September ===
September 2 - Women's Manifesto for Ghana issued in Accra

=== December ===
- 3rd - West African Gas Pipeline Project commissioned by President John Kufour.
- 7th - Presidential and Parliamentary Elections held.
- 9th - John Kufour declared winner of the Presidential elections.

== National holidays ==
Holidays in italics are "special days", while those in regular type are "regular holidays".

- January 1: New Year's Day
- March 6: Independence Day
- May 1: Labor Day
- December 25: Christmas
- December 26: Boxing Day

In addition, several other places observe local holidays, such as the foundation of their town. These are also "special days."
