= 2012 in Ghana =

- Decades: 1990s; 2000s; 2010s; 2020s
- See also: Other events of 2012; Timeline of Ghanaian history

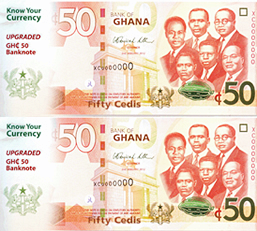
50-Cedi banknotes, the pictured edition of which were issued in 2012

2012 in Ghana details events of note that has been predicted to happen in the Ghana in the year 2012.

== Incumbents ==
- President - John Atta Mills (until July 24) John Dramani Mahama
- Vice President: Kwesi Amissah-Arthur
- Chief Justice: Georgina Wood
- Speaker of Parliament: Joyce Bamford-Addo

== Events ==
=== June ===
- June 2 — Nigerian cargo plane crashes at the Accra International Airport, killing ten people.

=== July ===
- July 24 - John Atta Mills, President of Ghana, dies suddenly at the Military Hospital in Accra.
- July 24 - John Dramani Mahama was sworn in as Ghana's new president

=== August ===
- August 6 - Kwesi Amissah-Arthur sworn in as Vice President of Ghana.

=== December ===
- 7 & 8 December - Presidential and parliamentary election to be held.

== National holidays ==
Holidays in italics are "special days", while those in regular type are "regular holidays".

- January 1: New Year's Day
- March 6: Independence Day
- April 22 Good Friday
- May 1: Labor Day
- December 25: Christmas
- December 26: Boxing Day

In addition, several other places observe local holidays, such as the foundation of their town. These are also "special days."
