= 2008 in Ghana =

- Decades: 1980s; 1990s; 2000s; 2010s; 2020s
- See also: Other events of 2008; Timeline of Ghanaian history

2008 in Ghana details events of note that happened in the Ghana in the year 2008.

== Incumbents ==
- President: John Kufuor
- Vice President: Aliu Mahama
- Chief Justice: Georgina Theodora Wood

== Events ==
=== February ===
- 20th - U.S. President George Bush arrives in Ghana for an official visit.

=== December ===
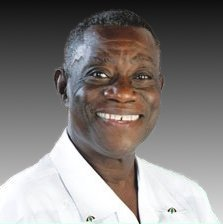
H.E. John Evan Atta Mills, President of Ghana

- 7 December - Presidential and parliamentary election held.
- 28 December - John Atta Mills wins presidential run off.

== National holidays ==
Holidays in italics are "special days", while those in regular type are "regular holidays".

- January 1: New Year's Day
- March 6: Independence Day
- April 22 Good Friday
- May 1: Labor Day
- December 25: Christmas
- December 26: Boxing Day

In addition, several other places observe local holidays, such as the foundation of their town. These are also "special days."
