= 2016 in Ghana =

- Decades: 1990s; 2000s; 2010s; 2020s
- See also: Other events of 2016; Timeline of Ghanaian history

== Incumbents ==
- President: John Dramani Mahama
- Vice President: Kwesi Amissah-Arthur
- Chief Justice: Georgina Wood

== Predicted and Scheduled Events ==
=== August ===
- August 5–21 - 1 Athletes from Ghana competed at the 2016 Summer Olympics in Rio de Janeiro, Brazil.

== See also ==
- Ghana at the 2016 Summer Olympics
