= 2009 in Ghana =

- Decades: 1980s; 1990s; 2000s; 2010s; 2020s
- See also: Other events of 2009; Timeline of Ghanaian history

Events from the year 2009 in Ghana.

== Incumbents ==
- President: John Kufuor (until 7 January), John Atta Mills
- Vice President: Aliu Mahama (until 7 January), John Dramani Mahama
- Chief Justice: Georgina Theodora Wood

== Events ==
- January 7 - John Atta Mills took office as president, the second time power in the country had been transferred from one legitimately elected leader to another democratically.

But John Atta Mills died a few days from his birthday after feeling sick and rushed to the hospital.
