= Ziobeieton Yeo =

Ivorian Business Executive

- Born: Ziobeieton Yeo; 10 November 1975 (age 50); Ivory Coast
- Education: ESCA Business School; University of Brighton
- Occupation: Business executive
- Employer(s): Unilever (2002–2018); Danone (2019– Present)
- Notable work: Unilever (MD); Danone (GM)
- Title: General Manager at Danone

Ziobeieton Yeo (born 10 November 1975), is an Ivorian business executive. Yeo serves as the General Manager of Fan Milk West Africa, a subsidiary to a French multinational food corporation, Danone, based in Accra, Ghana. Addition to this, he is the managing director of Fan Milk Ghana since January 2019. Prior to joining Fan Milk, between 2002 and 2019, Yeo served continuously for 17 years in different positions at Unilever, a British multinational FMCG company in several African countries including Ghana, South Africa, Kenya, Senegal and Ivory Coast. Where from January 2017 to December 2018, he was serving as country managing director for Unilever Ghana, the biggest Unilever business in Africa.

== Early life and education ==
Yeo was born on 10 November 1975. In 1995, he enrolled for bachelor's degree at École Supérieure de Commerce d' Abidjan or ESCA Business School in Ivory Coast, where he graduated in marketing, Communications and General Management. Subsequently, he continued his enrollment at the same university for post graduate degree, where he graduated in 2000. He also holds Business English certificate from University of Brighton, England since 2000.

== Career ==
In 1999, after he graduated from ESCA Business School in Ivory Coast, he started working as account manager at Ogilvy & Mather Ivory Coast, a subsidiary of Ogilvy & Mather International Inc in Ivory Coast, a New York-based British international advertising agency, until March 2002. Subsequently, Yeo joined the part of Africa of Unilever, a British multinational fast-moving consumer goods company. He worked as Brand Manager at the company responsible for Francophone market in the West Africa, based in Abidjan, Ivory Coast. In October 2004, Yeo was appointed as Senior Manager responsible for the brand activation in foods division at the Unilever Senegal, based in Dakar. He served this position for one year long. In October 2005, Yeo was promoted and became regional marketing manager at Unilever Africa. He was responsible for Unilever brand development in Western, Eastern and Southern Africa regions, based in Durban, South Africa. Yeo served this position for four years, until July 2009 when he was appointed Senior Marketing Director for Africa for Foods and Oral Care divisions at Unilever Kenya, based in Nairobi, Kenya.

In March 2012, Yeo returned to Durban, South Africa where he served as director at the Unilever responsible for market in the Western, Eastern and Southern Africa regions. He held this position until December 2015. Subsequently, Yeo was promoted and became managing director of Unilever Francophone West Africa, based in Abidjan, Ivory Coast, the hub of the cluster comprises 16 countries, responsible for the overall business Unit. He served this position until January 2017 when he appointed managing director of Unilever Ghana, the biggest Unilever business in Africa based in Accra, Ghana. Yeo took over from Ms. Maidie Arkutu and he resigned from the position in November 2018, he was succeeded by Gladys Amoah. In January 2019, Yeo joined Danone and he was appointed with duo roles, as the General Manager at Fan Milk West Africa and as the managing director of Fan Milk Ghana Limited. In his tenure, Yeo was recognized in 2021 Marketing World Awards (MWA) in Ghana as the ‘captain of industry’ with the most outstanding contribution to marketing.

== Other considerations ==
Yeo was a speaker at Africa CEO Forum 2023, took place in Abidjan, Ivory Coast. He mentioned that African food supplying companies needs more standardization of regulatory requirements to serve markets across the continent. He spoke at the 6th Ghana Industrial Summit and Exhibition (GISE) organized by the Association of Ghana Industries (AGI), on the theme, “Industrialization Through Sustainable and Efficient Supply Chain” held between 18 and 20 September 2023. Yeo also dedicates his time in contributing to rural communities' development.

== See also ==
- Gladys Amoah
- Unilever
