= Joseph Kingsley-Nyinah =

Ghanaian judge and Electoral Commissioner

Electoral Commissioner of Ghana
- In office 1978–1981
- President: Lt. General Fred Akuffo; J. J. Rawlings; Hilla Limann
- Preceded by: Isaac Kobina Abban
- Succeeded by: Military rule

Appeal Court Judge
- In office 1971–1980

Personal details
- Born: 21 August 1922 Akokuaso, Gold Coast
- Died: 18 February 2019 (aged 96) Accra
- Education: Achimota College
- Alma mater: Middle Temple
- Profession: Judge
- Awards: Order of the Volta

Joseph Kwame Kingsley-Nyinah was a Ghanaian judge who served as a justice of the Court of Appeal and also as the Electoral Commissioner for Ghana.

== Early life and education ==
Kingsley-Nyinah was born on 21 August 1922 at Akokuaso which is near Akim Oda in the Eastern Region of Ghana (then Gold Coast). He was the first child of Joseph Kingsley-Nyinah and Felicia Marfo. His father was a police officer and was transferred to various stations. This led to his education being in different places. He started his basic education at Akuse before continuing at the Government Boys' School at Cape Coast. He completed his basic education at the Achimota Primary School and went on to the Achimota College which he completed in 1942.

He worked as a teacher and then a law clerk before he proceeded to the United Kingdom in 1947 to study law at the Middle Temple, London. He was called to the Bar in June 1953.

== Career ==
Kingsley-Nyinah returned to the Gold Coast where he was called to the Bar. He went on to set up his own law firm, Obuadum Chambers in 1954. He was appointed as a magistrate at Kumasi, capital of the Ashanti Region by Kobina Arku Korsah who was then the Chief Justice of the Gold Coast as well as the acting Governor General. This made him the first magistrate in Kumasi. He served as a Juvenile Court Magistrate between 1955 and 1958. He became a High Court Judge in 1963 and an Appeals Court Judge in 1971. He served on the Ghana bench until his retirement in 1980. Kingsley-Nyinah is known to have been critical of interference with the judiciary by Kwame Nkrumah, first prime minister and president of Ghana.

== Elections and democracy ==
He was appointed the Electoral Commissioner in 1978 by the Supreme Military Council (SMC) led by Lt. General Fred Akuffo. This followed the departure of Isaac Kobina Abban, the previous commissioner. He had been appointed by the previous leader of the SMC, then General I. K. Acheampong but vacated the position due to being opposed to the attempts to rig the UNIGOV referendum by the military SMC government. He stayed on as Electoral Commissioner following the overthrow of the SMC by the Armed Forces Revolutionary Council under Flight Lieutenant Jerry Rawlings in June 1979 and went on to oversee the 1979 Ghanaian general election. His tenure ended when the government of Hilla Limann was overthrown by the Provisional National Defence Council (PNDC) military government led by Jerry Rawlings as the constitution of Ghana was suspended. He also contributed to the founding of the Coalition of Domestic Election Observers prior to the 2000 general election which saw the first change of government in Ghana by the ballot box.

== Other activities ==
Kingsley-Nyinah served on various boards and committees. In 1978, he was on the Disciplinary Committee of the General Legal Council and he was on the Council of Law Reporting between 1978 and 1980. He served on the management board of the Korle-Bu Teaching Hospital between 1970 and 1973. He was the Chairman of the Disciplinary Committee of the Ghana Football Association between 1970 and 1974. He was also a Managing Trustee of Valco Trust Fund from 1988 to 2002. He was also the Primus National Chairman of the Ghana Association of Methodist Church Choirs (GHAMECC). In 1985, he served as the chairman for the Committee of Inquiry into Payment of Compensation from Volta River Authority by Lands Department to the People of Kete-Krachi.

== Awards ==
In 2008, Kingsley-Nyinah was awarded the Order of the Volta in recognition of his contribution towards the development of the Judicial Service and the entrenchment of democracy in Ghana by President Kufuor.

== Family ==
He was survived by his wife, Georgina Kingsley-Nyinah and Joseph, Michael, David and Patrick Kingsley-Nyinah, Patricia Kyerematen, Georgina Bondzi-Simpson and Beatrice Archer. A state funeral was held in Accra prior to his interment. Alan John Kyerematen, Ministry of Trade and Industry of Ghana at the time of his death in 2019 is married to his daughter Patricia.

Preceded by Isaac Kobina Abban	Electoral Commissioner of Ghana; 1978 – 1981	Succeeded by Military rule
