= Emmanuel Arthur =

Ghanaian journalist

Emmanuel J.K. Arthur is a Ghanaian journalist who was awarded the Ghana Journalists Association Television News Reporter of the year in 2006.

== Educational background ==
Arthur holds a master's degree in Media Management, a bachelor's degree in Fine Arts, and a Diploma in Journalism and Certificate in Investigative Journalism from the World Bank Institute in Washington DC.

== Journalism career ==
Arthur worked with the TV3 television network in Ghana as the head of the Political and Governance Department as well as a news editor with the Multimedia Group. He led the establishment of OBE TV in Ghana and became its News Editor for the Ghana Bureau for months. While working at TV3, he was attached to the Presidency and the Parliament at different times and therefore covered major events including UN General Assembly Sessions, 2008 U.S. presidential debate between Obama and McCain, visit to the Canadian Parliament, ECOWAS Summits, among others.

== Management career ==
In 2009, he was appointed the Senior Communications Officer for World Vision International Ghana, an international non-governmental organization. He later moved to help establish the Consumer Affairs & Public Relations Department of the Postal and Courier Services Regulatory Commission of Ghana. He served as the commission's first Consumer Affairs and Public Relations Manager. In 2012, he was appointed as the Corporate Affairs Manager of rlg Communication Ltd. He is currently the Corporate Affairs Manager for the National Food Buffer Stock Company (NAFCO).

== Awards ==
- Ziam Yaan Tol Media Award for Reproductive Health and Advocacy from the United Nations Population Fund (UNFPA)
- 2006 Best Television News Reporter Award from the Ghana Journalists Association (GJA).
