= 2011 National Democratic Congress presidential primaries =

The National Democratic Congress (NDC) of Ghana is the ruling party of the country. The party was formed out of the Provisional National Defense Council (PNDC) before the 1992 Ghanaian presidential elections. The party opened nominations for election for the flag bearer of the party from 3 to 10 May 2011. The party also scheduled 8 July 2011 as the date for the election. The purpose of the election will allow the party to select a flag bearer to represent the party in the 2012 Ghanaian presidential election.

== Electoral time table ==
The NEC has also, agreed on the following time table as part of arrangements for the congress;

Date	Activity
May 3, 2011	Opening of Nomination
May 10, 2011	Closing of Nomination
June 1, 2011	Submission of Nomination
June 7 – June 8, 2011	Vetting of Candidates
June 10, 2011	Release of Delegates Lists

== Aspirants ==
On 2 May 2011, Nana Konadu Agyeman Rawlings former first lady of Ghana, was the first person to pick up a form to seek the presidential nomination of the ruling party. She is wife of Jerry John Rawlings. The sitting president of the country, John Atta Mills picked up his nomination form on 5 May 2011. On Tuesday, 10 May 2011, A (NDC), Dr Ekwow Spio-Garbrah (a vice-chairman of the NDC) became the third and last person to pick up nomination forms to contest for the leadership of the party. Dr Spio-Garbrah, is the CEO of the Commonwealth Telecommunications Organisation (CTO) which is based in London. If he contests the July 8 elections, it would be Dr Spio-Garbrah's second attempt at becoming the leader of the NDC, he had contested and lost the 2006 presidential primaries and lost to President Mills.

== Contestants ==
An aspirant becomes a contestants of the Presidential primaries upon the submission of the nomination form to the national secretariat of the party. On 30 May 2011, President John Mills submitted his nomination form making him the first candidate to contest the elections to be held on July 8, 2011.

== Results ==
On July 9, President John Mills won his party's nomination as presidential candidate for the 2010 Ghanaian presidential elections. He won 2,771 (96.9%) of the total votes cast. His challenger, Nana Konadu Agyeman Rawlings, wife of Jerry Rawlings, a former president of Ghana, polled just 90 (3.1%) of the votes.
