= Sakasaka =

Populated place in Northern Region, Ghana

Coordinates: 9.413°N 0.836°W

Sakasaka is a community in Tamale Metropolitan District in the Northern Region of Ghana. It is the home ground of the Sakasaka Football Club.

== See also ==
- Jisonaayili
