= Postal and Courier Services Regulatory Commission =

Ghana governmental body

The Postal and Courier Services Regulatory Commission is a Government of Ghana established commission with the purpose of serving the official body for the licensing and regulation of the operations of postal and courier services in Ghana.
