= Yakubu Moro =

Ghanaian sports executive (died 2020)

Alhaji Yakubu Moro
- Born: Yakubu Moro; Ghana
- Died: 15 October 2020; Accra
- Occupations: Administrator, Bankroller, Owner

Yakubu Moro (died 15 October 2020) was the owner, founder and bankroller of Berekum Arsenal F.C. He was also the club's executive. He was also a football administrator.

== Death ==
He was moved to Accra when he was sick for a while in Berekum when he was still receiving treatments. He died on Thursday evening of 15 October 2020 at the Ridge Regional Hospital in Accra after an illness. He was in his 60s when he passed. It was claimed he died after suffering stroke. He was buried on Friday, 16 October 2020 according to the Islamic practice.

== Legacy ==
It was under his tenure that Berekum Arsenal F.C. got promoted to the Ghana Premier League in 2000. The club moved on to stay in the top division for 13 years.

Also, it was under his tenure the club qualified for the CAF Confederation Cup in 2006.

He was claimed to be one of the football voices in the Ghanaian football circles whose opinions were taken into consideration. His club was said to have produced players such as John Paintsil, a former Ghanaian defender and also Agyeman Badu, a former Black Stars' player who played for some European clubs.
