= Owuraku Amofah =

Ghanaian politician (born 1956)

Member of Parliament for Abuakwa Central
- In office 7 January 1993 – 6 January 1997
- Succeeded by: Nana Akufo-Addo

Personal details
- Born: Emmanuel Owuraku Amofah; 8 February 1956 (age 70) Kibi, Gold Coast
- Party: NDC (2002–2008, since 2014)
- Other political affiliations: EGLE (until 2000); NPP (2008–2014)
- Children: Several, including Desmond
- Profession: Lawyer

Emmanuel Owuraku Amofah (born 8 February 1956; sometimes written as Amofa) is a Ghanaian politician and lawyer from Kibi who served as a member of the Parliament of Ghana for Abuakwa Central constituency from 1992 to 1996. He is a former deputy communication minister and deputy tourism minister. In 1992, he founded the Every Ghanaian Living Everywhere (EGLE) party. As a lawyer, he has worked in New York City as the CEO of Parking Ticket Busters, a ticket-broker business, as an attorney at Amofah Law Firm and as a one-time administrative law judge at the city's Parking Violations Bureau.

== Early life and education ==
Emmanuel Owuraku Amofah was born on 8 February 1956 in Kibi, Gold Coast. He attended the University of Ghana, where he obtained his Bachelor of Laws degree, before proceeding to the Ghana School of Law to become a barrister. He then relocated abroad and attended Brooklyn Law School, subsequently practicing law in the country.

== Career ==
Amofah studied law in America and was involved in Ghana's politics, serving as a Deputy of Tourism under President Jerry Rawlings. In 2000, he had an argument with Rawlings over failing to choose Obed Asamoah as a running mate. Asamoah was rumored to have taken money from the National Democratic Congress (NDC) so that Amofah could have a position in the government. During the confrontation, Amofah allegedly slammed the door on Rawlings' fingers, injuring him. As a result, Amofah went into a self-imposed exile in the US, where he became a Magistrate Judge in Staten Island, New York. His membership in EGLE lapsed, while he was out of the country shortly after. Amofah would later join the NDC in 2002 before leaving the party in 2008.

In 2013, he returned to Ghana as a member of the New Patriotic Party, where he supported his uncle Nana Akufo-Addo for a position in the government. However, when Akufo-Addo was running for president, he later changed his stance and claimed that Akufo-Addo would "be the worst President for Ghana." Amofah rejoined the NDC in 2014, and was supporting John Mahama's bid for presidency in the 2016 Ghanaian general election.

== Children ==
Amofah is the father of multiple children, including sons Randy and Desmond Amofah. Randy died on 31 October 2010 from an asthma attack. Desmond was an American YouTube personality and online streamer who was better known by his online alias "Etika". Desmond was reported missing on 20 June 2019, and his body was recovered on 25 June; his death was declared a suicide by drowning.
