= Etika =

American YouTuber and live streamer (1990–2019)

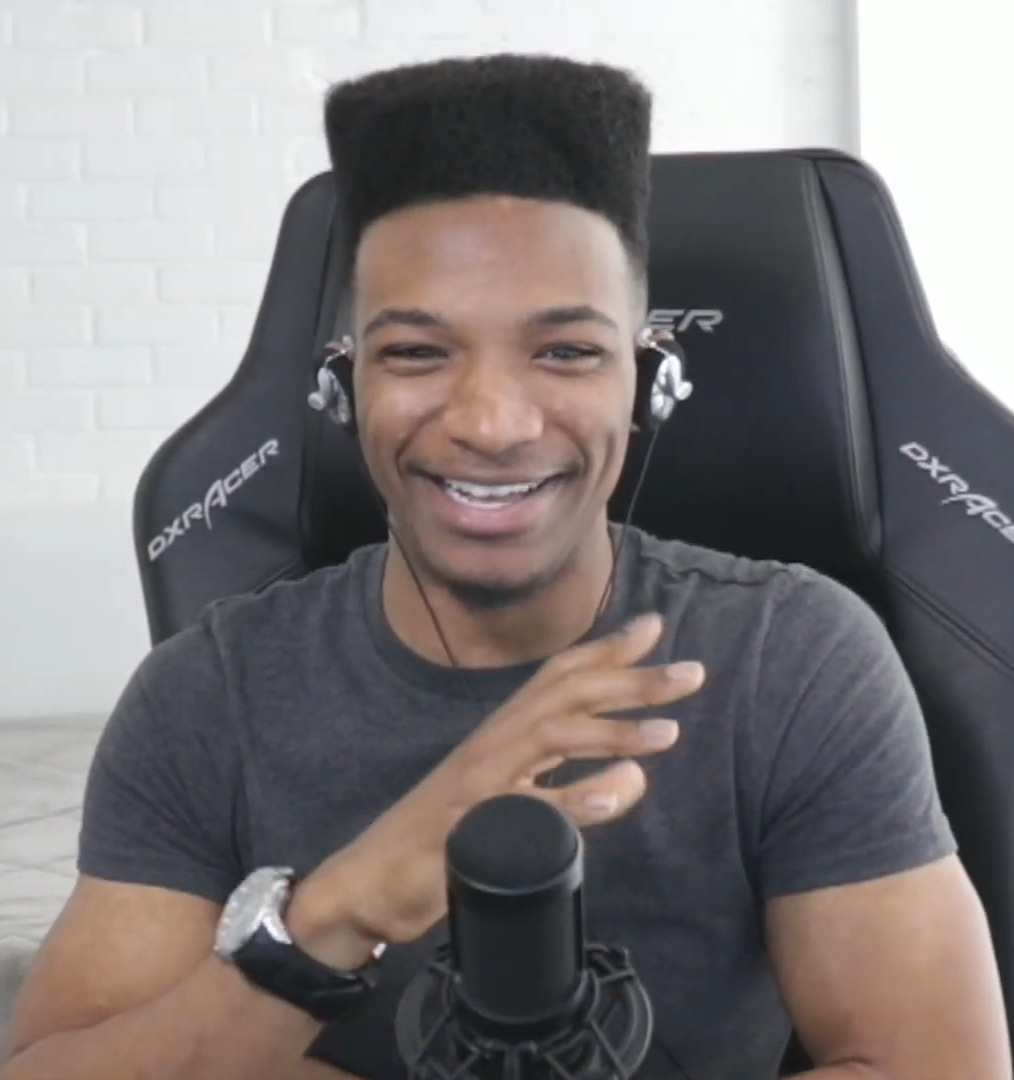
- Amofah in May 2019
- Born: Desmond Daniel Amofah; May 12, 1990; Brooklyn, New York City, U.S.
- Died: c. June 19, 2019 (aged 29) (Note: The exact date of Amofah's death is unknown. He was last heard from on June 19, 2019, and was subsequently reported missing. His body was recovered from the East River on June 24; authorities did not publicly specify a precise date of death during the intervening period.); East River, New York City, U.S.
- Other names: Iceman; Young Ramsay; Guile-kun
- Occupations: YouTuber; streamer
- Partner: Christine Cardona (2011–2017)
- Parents: Owuraku Amofah (father); Sabrina Amofah (mother)
- Relatives: Nana Akufo-Addo (granduncle)

YouTube information
- Channels: EWNetwork (terminated); EtikaFRFX (terminated); TR1Iceman; E Live
- Years active: 2006 (Note: Etika's activity dates back to 2006; however, his online career is typically dated from 2007, when he began producing content consistently.)–2019
- Genres: Let's Play; gaming; vlog; variety
- Subscribers: 1.3 million (combined) (Note: See: "EWNetwork's YouTube Stats". Social Blade. Archived from the original on August 24, 2019.; "EtikaFRFX's YouTube Stats". Social Blade. Archived from the original on July 22, 2019.; "TR1Iceman's YouTube Stats". Social Blade. Archived from the original on July 13, 2019.)
- Views: 146 million (combined)
- Website: etikaworldnetwork.com

Desmond Daniel Amofah (Note: Pronounced /əˈmoʊ.fɑː/ uh-MOH-fah.) (May 12, 1990 – c. June 19, 2019), better known as Etika, was an American YouTuber and live streamer. Amofah became known online for his dramatic reactions to Super Smash Bros. character trailers, Nintendo Direct presentations, and for playing and reacting to various games. He resided in the Brooklyn borough of New York City; his father is the Ghanaian politician Owuraku Amofah and his granduncle is the former Ghanaian president Nana Akufo-Addo. Starting his online career in 2007, Amofah created his main YouTube channel, "EWNetwork" (Etika World Network), in 2012. His fanbase was dubbed the "JOYCONBOYZ" in reference to the Nintendo Switch controller, the Joy-Con. He garnered popularity following the release of Super Smash Bros. 4, primarily stemming from his reaction videos of news surrounding the game. His content consisted of playthroughs of various video games, reaction videos, and pre-recorded material. Across his multiple YouTube channels, he amassed over 1 million subscribers and 146 million views.

Between October 2018 and May 2019, Amofah demonstrated signs of mental distress, threatening to commit suicide on multiple occasions, and was hospitalized several times. During this period, Amofah uploaded pornography to the EWNetwork channel, resulting in its termination; he then posted statements on social media alluding to suicide. After apologizing, Amofah created another channel, "EtikaFRFX", which was terminated for identical reasons. He proceeded to display erratic behavior publicly, including posting cryptic messages online and streaming himself being detained by the police.

Amofah was reported missing on June 20, 2019, after an apologetic video was uploaded to his "TR1Iceman" channel. (Note: Amofah was officially reported missing by the New York Police Department on June 20, 2019, but his last known communication was around 8 p.m. EDT the day before.) After recovering his body from the East River near the Manhattan Bridge, officials confirmed Amofah's death on June 25, finding it to be a suicide by drowning. Amofah's death was met with expressions of shock and grief by fans and fellow YouTubers, with some observers commenting that the signs of Amofah's mental deterioration were either dismissed or ignored. Commemorations were held to honor Amofah's career as a gaming personality, including fan-made memorials and murals.

== Early life ==
Desmond Daniel Amofah was born on May 12, 1990, in the Brooklyn borough of New York, to Owuraku Amofah, a Ghanaian politician and lawyer from Kibi, and Sabrina Amofah. His mother is of Haitian descent and his father was based in Ghana in the 1990s as a member of the Parliament of Ghana from 1992 to 1996. After allegedly assaulting the Ghanaian president Jerry Rawlings by slamming a door on his fingers, he moved to the United States to become a Magistrate Judge before returning to Ghana in 2013. Amofah rarely mentioned his relationship with his father. His granduncle Nana Akufo-Addo served as the president of Ghana from 2017 to 2025. He had an older brother, Randy Amofah, who died in 2010 from an asthma attack after a sandstorm in Accra, Ghana. He also had a half-brother, Cardinal Valery, who ventured into online video creation following his death. Cardinal has faced controversy from Amofah's fanbase, including being accused of exploiting Amofah's death for personal monetary gain.

Based in New York, Amofah primarily resided in Brooklyn. Prior to his career as a gaming YouTuber, Amofah was active in modeling and rapping, having uploaded rap videos from 2007 to 2009 under the name "Iceman". He also released an independently-produced mixtape titled Written in Ice in 2007. Amofah started modeling in his early twenties and continued until 2015. He owned an account on the modeling and social media website Model Mayhem, where he stated he was "quite tall" and that his last measurement of height was 6 ft 6 in (1.98 m). Amofah also dealt with homelessness, temporarily living in a shelter after quitting his job at Uniqlo to become a full-time YouTuber.

Amofah stated in a tweet that the pseudonym "Etika" came from the 2003 video game Sonic Battle. In the game, players could input a cheat code titled "EkiTa"; he decided to switch the T and the K to create his username as he "liked that result better". He was inspired to grow a hi-top fade from Grand Theft Auto: San Andreas, which featured the hairstyle in the game.

== YouTube career ==
=== Origins and popularity (2012–2018) ===
Having previously used the YouTube account "TR1Iceman", Amofah created a new YouTube account under the username "EWNetwork" (Etika World Network) in 2012 to broadcast his gaming and reaction streams. Prior to the termination of the channel in 2018, he amassed more than 800,000 subscribers, reaching 100,000 subscribers in 2015. Within months of creating a replacement YouTube channel, "EtikaFRFX", he had gained 300,000 subscribers, and reached over 130,000 subscribers on his "TR1Iceman" channel. In total, Amofah accumulated over one million subscribers and 146 million views across his multiple YouTube channels.

Amofah's content was mainly Nintendo-focused. Initially centered around gaming news, his video output evolved to a focus on Let's Play videos of Nintendo games alongside reaction videos of gaming announcements, such as Nintendo Direct presentations. Amofah's reaction videos were noted for their characteristic exaggerated and energetic style; they typically featured moments such as him falling out of his chair in elated shock and tossing objects around his room. Amofah's channel garnered popularity in 2014 due to his reaction videos covering new information about the then-unreleased fighting game Super Smash Bros. 4. One of his most notable reactions to the game was to the announcement of Pokémon character Mewtwo's inclusion as a DLC fighter; during the reaction, Amofah excitedly screams "Mewtwo!" with several profanities, in particular "Holy shit" and "My dick!" The video became Amofah's most viewed video on EWNetwork and was retweeted by the creator of the game, Masahiro Sakurai. A similar video where Amofah reacted to the announcement of Super Smash Bros. Ultimate also went viral in 2018. Amofah's channel continued to grow in popularity as he made more videos centered around his reactions to gaming news and YouTube drama; according to him, he was earning over $300,000 a year through his internet career. Despite his earnings, Amofah revealed in a June 2017 video that he had dealt with multiple "chargebacks", or "fake donations" of large amounts of money sent to his PayPal account, which resulted in Amofah being charged hundreds of dollars in processing fees.

Amofah dubbed his fans the "JOYCONBOYZ", after the Nintendo Switch controllers known as the Joy-Con. The origin of the name came from a viral livestream in November 2016 where Amofah purported to have a Nintendo Switch console before its 2017 release. After the stream came under scrutiny by viewers, it was revealed that the model Amofah displayed was 3D-printed by fellow YouTuber "Sandqvist" at his request, following a pre-recorded video Amofah uploaded titled "Life with Nintendo Switch" featuring the fake console. Amofah would frequently end his videos with his signature catchphrase "Take care of yourselves, and of course, as usual, please have yourself a damn good one". In Japan, Amofah was commonly referred to as "Guile-kun" in reference to his hairstyle, which resembled the character Guile from the fighting game Street Fighter. Though he primarily focused on Nintendo-related content, Amofah uploaded playthroughs of video games from multiple publishers, such as Call of Duty, Overwatch, Undertale, and Doki Doki Literature Club!, and was also a fan of games such as Final Fantasy VII and Minecraft. Amofah enjoyed anime and Japanese culture, frequently streaming himself watching series such as Attack on Titan while providing commentary.

=== Channel terminations (2018–2019) ===
"Let my story be one that advises caution on too much of the social media shit, man. It can fuck you up. It can give you an image of what you want your life to be, and it can get blown completely out of proportion, dawg. Unfortunately, it consumed me. It made me forget about consequences to my actions. It made me forget that we have to pay for the things that we say. It made me forget that there are – there is weight behind words. I was so consumed with this great image that I had that I thought I was invulnerable to everything. I thought, 'oh, I'm destined for this, nothing can stop me'".

— Amofah in his final video.

During the last months of his life, Amofah publicly demonstrated erratic behavior and signs of mental distress, which drew media attention while concerning both his fans and the YouTube community. On October 23, 2018, Amofah was temporarily suspended from Twitter for using the word nigga in a tweet. He responded to the suspension by uploading a video of himself frequently saying the word and defending himself for using it. During the video, Amofah asserted that the word had been embraced among black people and should no longer be considered a racial slur. Amofah also mentioned rappers Travis Scott and Drake, who use the word in their songs. Two days later, Amofah uploaded pornography to EWNetwork, which violated YouTube's policies and consequently led to the channel's termination. Following the termination, Amofah posted cryptic messages to social media, including the statement "it's my turn to die", coupled with a screenshot of his terminated account. Several followers felt that the messages and posts were suicidal, which quickly generated panic among his fanbase. Inactive for three days after the incident, Amofah checked into a mental hospital where he claimed he was examined by doctors and given anxiety medication. He later apologized on his subreddit r/EtikaRedditNetwork. Amofah also cited issues with YouTube's rules as one of the main factors for shutting down his channel, claiming on Twitter that he purposefully deleted the account "as a form of protesting against edgy content demonetization and PC policy". Soon after the incident, Amofah was banned from Twitch for using the word faggot during a stream; he had read a conversation between him and a streamer which contained the word.

After the termination of his first YouTube account, Amofah created a new channel in October 2018 called "EtikaFRFX", which he explained would comprise more sincere content where "he would be more himself". Although Amofah's new channel initially grew in popularity, the channel was terminated in April 2019 after Amofah again posted pornographic material. Following said termination, Amofah posted several tweets related to suicide, the first one stating "Savonarola! I'm going to kill myself! You lot certainly have already. Shame on you all, silly humans". He then tweeted he would kill himself by shooting himself in the head. This tweet led to his detainment and hospitalization. Christine "Alice Pika" Cardona, who had dated Amofah from 2011 to 2017, confirmed that she was with him when he was taken to the hospital. Days later, Amofah posted a photoshopped picture of himself holding a gun, which Cardona later confirmed was fake. After his detainment, Amofah tweeted an apology on April 25, explaining his behavior as dark shock humor.

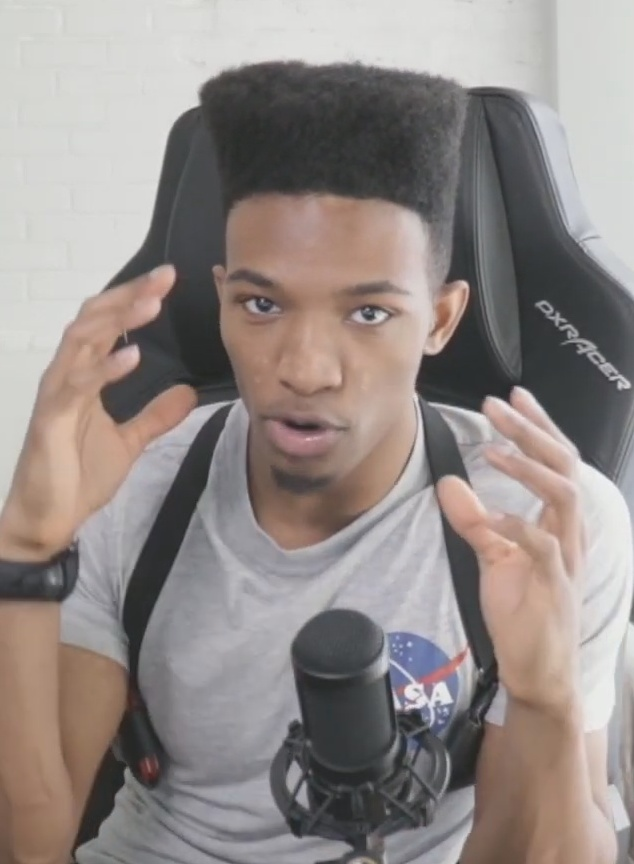
Amofah on June 4, 2019, 15 days before his disappearance

Amofah's erratic behavior continued throughout the rest of April. On April 29, after tweeting a vast quantity of cryptic messages, including homophobic and anti-semitic slurs which he later deleted, he blocked close friends and other YouTubers. Later that day, he livestreamed himself being detained by police from his apartment to over 19,000 viewers on Instagram Live, after a concerned fan notified police about his tweets. Before his detainment, Amofah alternated between recording his reaction to the officers and the street outside which was surrounded by police vehicles, while refusing to allow officers to enter his apartment. Throughout the stream, he expressed his fear over the situation. Amofah also shouted phrases and quotes from his apartment window, including "The Revolution Will Not Be Televised". Lasting for 45 minutes and resulting in Amofah trending on Twitter, the stream culminated in the police escorting Amofah out of his apartment, after which he was carried on a stretcher and taken to a Brooklyn hospital in an ambulance. Amofah was soon released from the hospital, posting a picture of himself holding a release form which revealed his diagnosis of agitation.

A day after the stream, Amofah was interviewed by the host of Internet news show DramaAlert, Daniel "Keemstar" Keem. In the interview, Amofah made various statements primarily referencing death and his views on the world, at one point mentioning that he was the "antichrist" and wanted to "purge all life". Keem questioned whether Amofah's actions leading up to the interview were publicity stunts, and if Amofah had a genuine mental breakdown. Denying that his actions were a publicity stunt, Amofah later claimed that life was a "video game" and that "death means nothing". Keem then asked Amofah if life is a simulation, "then why live?... Just jump off a cliff? If it's just a simulation, who cares?" The interview climaxed with Amofah and Keem arguing for several minutes before Amofah abruptly left; Keem stated that Amofah blocked him on Twitter shortly after their call. The same day, Amofah posted a livestream of himself consuming raw eggs while making monkey noises, and then playing Super Smash Bros. Ultimate.

Following the interview, Amofah was detained again on May 1 for assaulting a police officer. Recorded on video, the altercation showed Amofah approaching the officer and raising his middle fingers before pushing the officer, who retaliated by attempting to hit Amofah. He was not arrested for the incident but instead taken to a hospital, as confirmed by a tweet from Cardona. Detained for two weeks, Amofah was released on May 14 and continued making reaction videos on his TR1Iceman channel; he also claimed that the officer had attacked him in response to his gesture, and that he had hit the police officer in self-defense. His last videos included reactions to the Sonic the Hedgehog film and Black Mirror along with his reaction to the Nintendo Direct presentation for E3 2019.

Amofah's erratic behavior around this time was perceived by a significant portion of the online world as humorous in nature, rather than indicative of genuine mental ailment. The video in which Amofah assaulted a police officer was posted online with the caption "LMFAOOOOOOOO", with the clip featuring witnesses to the event laughing. On social media, many viewers mocked his behavior by spamming clown emojis. Among his fanbase, rumors circulated that Amofah's various controversies formed part of an alternate reality game, with such rumors emerging from a stream Amofah posted in September 2017 and becoming more prominent following his first channel termination.

== Disappearance and death ==
Amofah's last video, "I'm sorry", uploaded at midnight on June 20, 2019, EDT

At midnight on June 20, 2019, a pre-recorded video titled "I'm sorry" was automatically uploaded to Amofah's TR1Iceman channel. In the video, Amofah walks through the streets of New York City talking about his mental health and suicidal thoughts along with the negative aspects of social media. He apologizes for pushing people away from him while also advising caution towards the overuse of social media. The video's description contained an apologetic note written by Amofah that expressed a similar sentiment. YouTube soon removed the video for violating its Community Guidelines, although the video was later reposted to other outlets. After leaving some of his belongings on the pedestrian walkway, Amofah jumped from the Manhattan Bridge and drowned.

Amofah was reported missing to the New York City Police Department (NYPD) the day after the "I'm sorry" video was uploaded. Shortly after his disappearance, fellow Internet personalities and his fans tried reaching out to him to offer help and show their appreciation for his work over the years. A tweet Amofah had posted on June 2 where he asked when his next mental breakdown should occur received notice amid his disappearance. Amofah's belongings were soon discovered on the pedestrian walkway of the Manhattan Bridge. (Note: Sources differ on the date that Amofah's belongings were found; The Daily Dot claimed that the police found his belongings on June 19, while The Verge, Kotaku and Digital Trends claim his belongings were found on June 22.) They included a backpack, wallet, laptop bag, cell phone, a change of clothes, and a Nintendo Switch.

On the evening of June 24, a body was observed near Pier 16 at the South Street Seaport, approximately half a mile (0.8 km) down the East River from where Amofah's belongings were recovered, and reported to the NYPD. By the morning of June 25, the NYPD and emergency medical services had recovered the body, confirmed it was Amofah, and stated that he was dead at the point of discovery. The following day, the Office of Chief Medical Examiner confirmed the cause of death was suicide by drowning. He was 29 years old.

=== Reactions and analysis ===
Following the announcement of his death, Amofah became the top trending topic on Twitter worldwide as many of his fans posted tributes for him. Several YouTubers offered their condolences to Amofah on social media. Felix Kjellberg, known as PewDiePie, was one of the first YouTubers to post a tribute to Amofah, stating in a tweet, "Hard to grasp that he's actually gone, left us way too soon. You will continue to live on in our hearts. Rest in peace Etika". Beauty YouTuber James Charles expressed on Twitter: "My heart is so so heavy hearing this news. I hope that the community FINALLY realizes that creators are human beings with real, valid feelings". The official "YouTube Creators" Twitter account posted a tribute to Amofah: "We mourn the loss of Etika, a beloved member of our gaming creator community". Rapper Lil Nas X also shared his condolences, stating that he "didn't know Amofah very well" but did know that he "inspired many and made a lot of people very happy". Other personalities who offered condolences included Keem, DanTDM, and SonicFox.

The circumstances surrounding Amofah's death prompted discussions on social media about dealing with mental health as a content creator. In an article from The Verge, internet personalities such as Asmongold and CoryxKenshin lamented how the negativity targeted towards content creators can be detrimental to their well-being, and that people who leave negative remarks on social media do so with the perception that online content creators are immune to such criticism, due to their ability to make money online. Doctor of internal medicine Alan Bunney echoed similar sentiments, also claiming that struggles with mental health have been "increasingly common" in content creation. Fiona Nova, content creator and friend of Amofah, also condemned his fans on Twitter for disregarding his mental health struggles as jokes, while Cardona stated that Amofah was often attracted to the vitriol he received. Amofah's death also highlighted social media platforms' handling of posts by users who appear at risk of mental illness or who are contemplating suicide. YouTube, in removing Amofah's final video, stated that removal of such videos is standard practice to "reduce the potential for copycat acts of self-harm, videos that express suicidal ideation" and that as part of this, it sends information to users relating to national suicide hotlines to provide help. The website also offered resources regarding mental health concerns among creators, such as courses and videos. However, Amofah's situation was noted as emblematic of YouTube's passive approach to aiding creators in coping with the pressures of content creation.

Journalists and mental health researchers found several videos Amofah had posted that showed evidence of his troubled state but were construed as jokes by some of his viewers. As a result, some perceived Amofah's final video as another joke and disregarded any concern over his well-being. Keem initially thought Amofah's final video was a premeditated publicity stunt, stating after Amofah's death, "I was never fully convinced that he was mentally ill or in trouble because of our private convos". Such researchers suggested that Amofah's situation reflected the need for more research on the effects of social media on content creators' mental health. Researchers Kaylee Kruzan and Victor Schwartz acknowledged the discrepancies in the number of studies between social media's effects among adolescents and adults and among content creators and influencers. In a Rolling Stone article on Amofah's death, psychologist April Foreman, PhD, discussed general information surrounding the awareness of mental health issues and suicide concerns among online gaming communities. Analyzing his final video, Margi Murphy of The Daily Telegraph viewed Amofah's demeanor as an example of a claim from psychiatrist Richard Graham about the shifting perceptions between the real and online world due to the prevalence of livestreaming. Writing about his struggles with mental health, Patricia Hernandez of Polygon reflected on how Amofah was not taken seriously enough by both his fans and mental health facilities. Hernandez opined of Amofah's situation that "it's the gnawing, uneasy realization that everything was unfolding in front of our eyes, clearly and openly, and it didn't make any difference. It's the sinking feeling that maybe, just maybe, we – viewers, social media, platforms like YouTube – let this happen".

Following Amofah's death, Keem became a target of some of Amofah's fans, who blamed him for Amofah's suicide due to the DramaAlert interview and statements made in tweets before and following the interview. Keem later posted screenshots of a series of texts allegedly sent to him by Amofah's mother Sabrina, which stated that "Etika loved Keemstar's show" and had only wanted to make a memorable appearance on it; Cardona also confirmed the veracity of the texts. He also shared that Amofah's mother encouraged fans to donate to mental health organizations instead of the family for funeral costs. Despite Sabrina's alleged defense of Keem, he was later accused of influencing Amofah's death in a May 2020 video by internet personality Ethan Klein. Klein also referred to the allegation on the Frenemies podcast while discussing Amofah. In response, Keem stated: "His mother came out with a statement saying that I am in no way responsible for the tragic loss of Etika, and he's still doing it. He just made this big rant and said stuff that I have never said". Keem also claimed that Amofah's friends and family had told Klein to stop using Amofah's suicide to attack him. Along with his other controversies, the video resulted in Keem ending his sponsorship with the energy drink company G Fuel.

== Legacy ==
Amofah's death led to numerous tributes across social media honoring his career. In December 2019, The New York Times Magazine published an article acknowledging Amofah's impact as a YouTuber, with writer Jamie Lauren Keiles noting that his content's appeal "had always been figuring out which parts were real", and that he "was himself until the end". The same month, Kotaku included Amofah in their list of the top gamers of the year, remarking that his death prompted many of his fans and other internet personalities to discuss the impact of social media on mental health. BBC News listed Amofah's death as one of the biggest technology stories of 2019, noting the various commemorations of him throughout the year; writer Leo Kelion stated that "Etika's claim in his final video that 'this world's gonna forget me' shows no sign of coming true any time soon". In an article from NBC News, esports journalist Rod Breslau avowed that Amofah "will go down as one of [the] greatest entertainers in video game history".

In the aftermath of Amofah's suicide, both fans and YouTubers on social media asked for YouTube to re-upload Amofah's final video to help memorialize him. A Change.org petition, which also asked for Amofah's original channel to be restored to preserve his legacy, was started and garnered 370,000 signatures. Another Change.org petition which reached over two million signatures called for Amofah to be buried at YouTube headquarters, which he stated was his wish during an earlier livestream; however, this was considered unlikely to occur due to private land regulations. YouTube also attracted criticism for not including a tribute to Amofah in the 2019 installment of YouTube Rewind. Kjellberg later uploaded his own version of the video titled "YouTube Rewind 2019, but it's actually good", which featured a homage to Amofah among other deceased content creators in 2019.

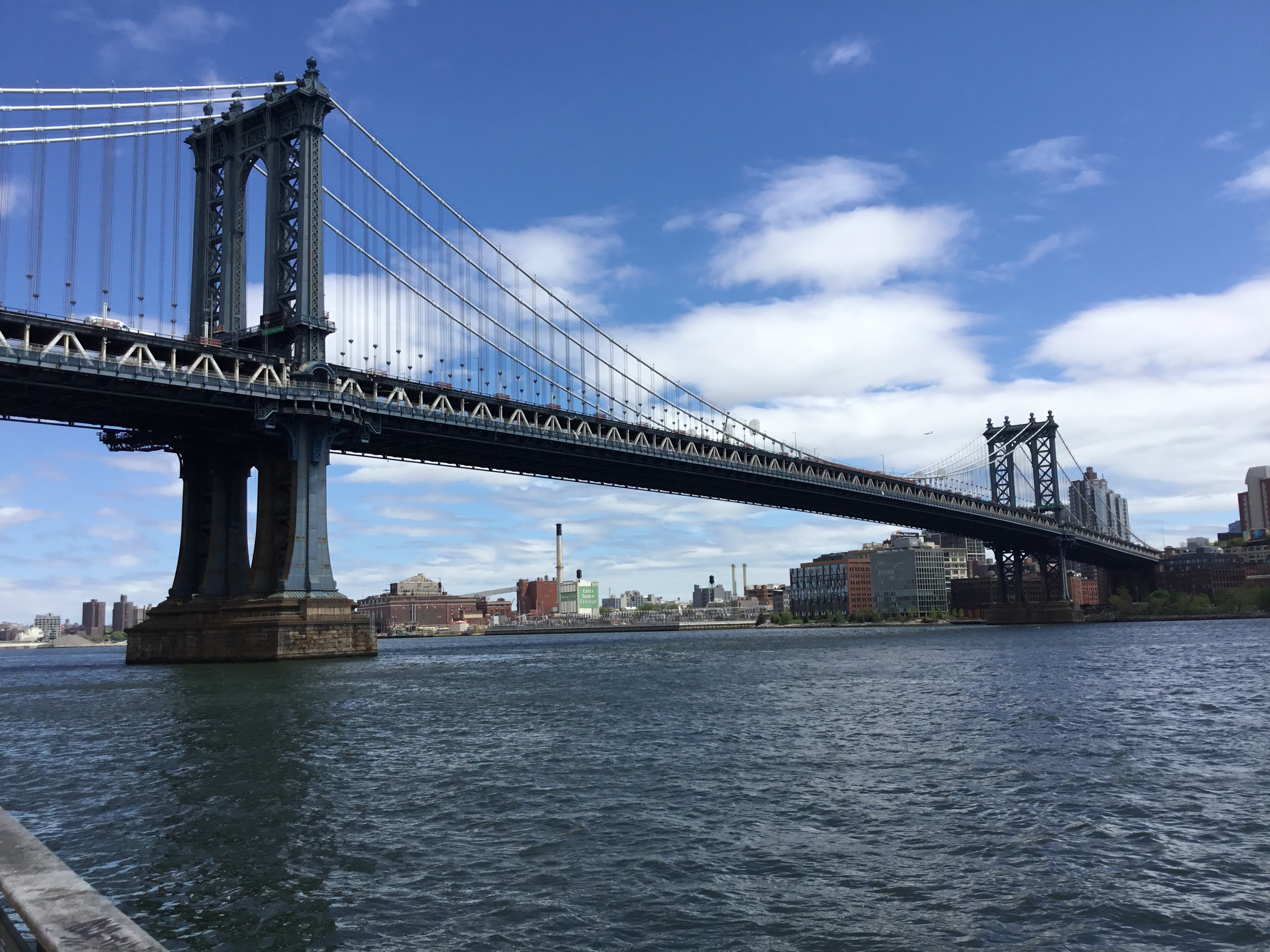
The Manhattan Bridge, where a memorial was erected by Amofah's fans following his suicide in June 2019

Several days after his death, fans erected a memorial on Amofah's behalf on the pedestrian walkway of the Manhattan Bridge, leaving letters, fan art, Twizzlers (a candy Amofah enjoyed), Nintendo-related products, and other memorabilia. Various fans changed their social media profile pictures to resemble Amofah's channel logo, alongside posting pictures of themselves with tattoos of his logo. A Twitter account, "Memories of Etika", was also established in dedication of Amofah.

In the Super Smash Bros. community, an online tournament was held as a tribute to Amofah featuring the antagonist Ridley from the video game series Metroid, a character Amofah often played. Posthumously, he was awarded the "Best Reaction" award at the 3rd Annual Smashies Awards which took place at Super Smash Con 2019. Fans of Amofah later pointed out on social media that the second DLC Fighter Pass for Super Smash Bros. Ultimate contains several characters Amofah had expressed a strong liking towards – including Pyra and Mythra from Xenoblade Chronicles 2 and Min Min from Arms – following the February 2021 Nintendo Direct, leading Amofah to trend on Twitter.

In addition to tributes, various fundraisers for mental health charities came to fruition following Amofah's death. YouTuber and web designer Abe Hunter, along with YouTuber Double-A, converted Amofah's website into a fundraiser site where 100% of the profits were to be donated to National Alliance on Mental Illness (NAMI) in Amofah's name. They raised $11,315.25 in total, which Hunter donated to the NAMI on July 15, 2019. Several days later on July 21, 2019, Kjellberg along with American actor Jack Black started a fundraiser on the crowdfunding website GoFundMe for the NAMI. Kjellberg and Black streamed themselves playing Minecraft together to raise money for their fundraiser, with the former donating $10,000 and the stream raising over $30,000. The YouTube group "im salt", a channel that posted highlight clips from Amofah's livestreams, also organized a charity stream which raised over $3,000.

After raising money for charity, Abe Hunter and Double-A worked with mural artist BK Foxx and graffiti artists Kestaadm and JMZWalls to create a 40-feet-long mural dedicated to Amofah in Bushwick, Brooklyn. Completed on November 6, 2019, the mural was created to celebrate Amofah's life and to help bring awareness to mental health issues. Dutch YouTuber Reversal, who was friends with Amofah, organized a campaign with his 350,000 fans for the company Niantic to add the mural's location as a virtual "PokéStop" in the augmented reality game Pokémon Go in memory of Amofah. The mural was added to the game in February 2020. Abe Hunter, Double A and BK Foxx would organize another mural in dedication of Amofah in October 2022.

== See also ==
- Digital media use and mental health
- List of solved missing person cases (post-2000)
- List of YouTubers
