= Paul Quaye =

Ghanaian footballer (born 1995)

Personal information
- Full name: Paul Quaye
- Date of birth: 16 September 1995 (age 31)
- Place of birth: Accra, Ghana
- Height: 1.78 m (5 ft 10 in)
- Position: Defensive midfielder

Youth career
- Aspire Academy
- 2009–2012: Espanyol

Senior career*
Years	Team	Apps	(Gls)
2011–2014	Espanyol B	50	(1)
2012	Espanyol	1	(0)
2014–2015	Málaga B	26	(1)
2015–2016	Elche B	29	(2)
2016–2017	Senica	12	(0)
2017	Jumilla	11	(0)
2017–2019	Talavera	29	(0)
2020	Moralo	4	(0)

International career
2013	Ghana U20		
- * Club domestic league appearances and goals as of 10 June 2020

Paul Quaye (born 16 September 1995) is a Ghanaian footballer who plays as a defensive midfielder.

== Football career ==
Born in Accra, Quaye joined Espanyol's youth setup in 2009, aged 13. He made his senior debuts with the reserves in the 2011–12 campaign, in Segunda División B.

On 11 March 2012, Quaye made his first-team - and La Liga - debut, playing three minutes in a 5–1 home routing against Rayo Vallecano, and being the youngest foreign player to play in the top level. He spent the vast majority of his spell with the B-side, however.

On 13 July 2014 Quaye rescinded with the Pericos and moved to another reserve team, Atlético Malagueño in Tercera División. On 1 September of the following year he joined Elche CF, being assigned to its B-team also in the fourth tier.
