= Gladys Amoah =

Managing Director of Unilever Ghana

Gladys Amoah was the Managing Director of Unilever Ghana. Her appointment was effective from the 1st of November 2018 to 20 December 2019. Gladys was also previously the Customer Development Director of Unilever Ghana and later acquired the position of managing director in the same organisation when Mr. Ziobeieton Yeo resigned in 2018.

== Career ==
During her time as the Customer Marketing Director, she had over 20 years experience in Fast Moving Consumer Goods under her belt. She also held positions in Marketing over the years out of Home, Personal Care and Home Care foods. Mrs Amoah joined the company in 2012 and was Customer Marketing Director for Hygiene in South Africa for Personal Care.
