= E. N. P. Sowah =

Ghanaian judge

E. N. P. Sowah JSC

7th Chief Justice of Ghana
- In office 1986–1990
- Appointed by: Jerry Rawlings
- Preceded by: Fred Kwasi Apaloo
- Succeeded by: Philip Edward Archer

Personal details
- Born: 23 September 1921 Accra

Justice Ernest Nee Pobee Sowah JSC (born 23 September 1921, date of death unknown) was the Chief Justice of Ghana from 1986 to 1990.

== Early life ==
He was born on September 23, 1921, to James Durnford Sowah to the Royal Stool House of Kpobi We, Kowe, La and Margaret Mansah Quao of Adedinkpo, Accra. He entered Achimota School in 1936.

== Career ==
He presided over the case brought by Amaoako Tuffuor, a Ghanaian citizen, when the People's National Party government of Hilla Limann attempted to replace Justice Fred Kwasi Apaloo as the Chief Justice of Ghana by vetting him. He ruled that Apaloo was the Chief Justice on the coming into force of the 1979 Ghanaian constitution and was thus the incumbent Chief Justice.

He went on to succeed Apaloo in 1986. This was during the era of the military Provisional National Defence Council (PNDC) government. He was retained as Chief Justice beyond the compulsory retirement age by the PNDC, a move which was controversial at the time.

== Personal life ==
The 2002 book "Who Killed the Judges?" by police officer Jacob Yidana notes that Justice Sowah is deceased, but doesn't state when he died.

== Publications ==
- 1981 - Non-Aligned Nations, 13 Case W. Res. J. Int'l L. 439 (1981)

== See also ==
- Chief Justice of Ghana
- List of judges of the Supreme Court of Ghana
- Supreme Court of Ghana

Legal offices
Preceded by Fred Kwasi Apaloo	Chief Justice of Ghana; 1986–1990	Succeeded by Philip Edward Archer
