= Samuel Azu Crabbe =

Ghanaian barrister (1918–2005)

His Lordship Samuel Azu Crabbe JSC
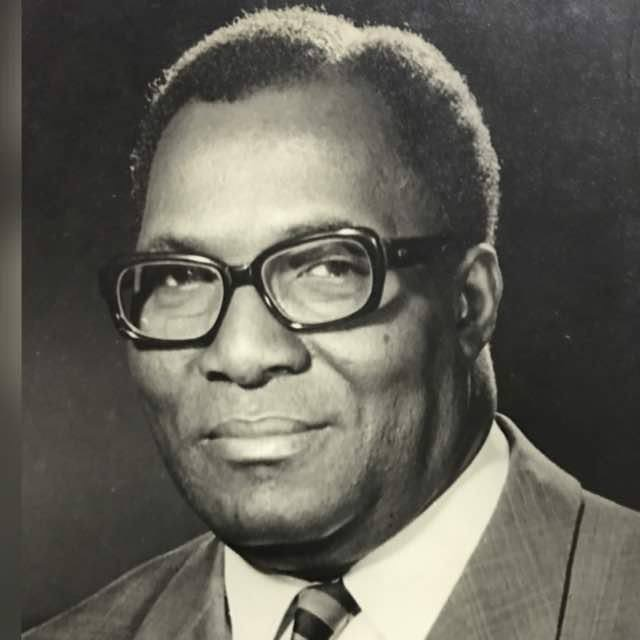

5th Chief Justice of Ghana
- In office 1973 – 15 June 1977
- Appointed by: I.K. Acheampong / NRC
- Preceded by: Edmund A.L. Bannerman
- Succeeded by: Fred Kwasi Apaloo

Supreme Court Judge
- In office 1971 – 13 January 1972
- Appointed by: Kofi Abrefa Busia
- In office 1961 – 24 February 1966
- Appointed by: Kwame Nkrumah

Personal details
- Born: 18 November 1918 Accra, Ghana
- Died: 15 September 2005 (aged 86) Aburi, Ghana
- Children: 5
- Education: Accra Academy
- Alma mater: University College London

Samuel Azu Crabbe (18 November 1918 – 15 September 2005) was a Ghanaian barrister, solicitor and jurist. He was the fifth Chief Justice of Ghana since it became an independent nation.

== Early life and education ==
Samuel Azu Crabbe was born at James Town, a suburb of Accra, the capital of Ghana. He received his secondary education at Accra Academy where he was head boy in 1939, and thereafter studied at Achimota College. He then proceeded to University College London, where he graduated with a law degree in 1946. He was called to the English Bar in 1948 at Middle Temple. While a student, he was quite active in sports and was the captain of a variety of junior and university football, hockey and cricket teams.

== Sports ==
Azu Crabbe continued to be active in sports beyond his educational days. He was the President of the Ghana National Olympic Committee from 1968 to 1969. He was re-elected to the same position in 1979.

== Career ==
Samuel Azu Crabbe returned to Ghana after his training in the UK, where he practised as a barrister and solicitor from 1950 onwards. He became a High Court judge in 1959 and was appointed a judge of the Supreme Court of Ghana in 1961. Azu Crabbe performed other roles in addition to his judicial responsibilities. He was once the head of the National Finance Board during the rule of the National Liberation Council, which had overthrown the Nkrumah government. In 1967, he was appointed the head of a commission of enquiry (the Azu Crabbe commission) to probe the assets of Kwame Nkrumah, the former president of Ghana. He was appointed Chief Justice by the National Redemption Council (NRC) in 1973. The NRC was the military government that had overthrown the Busia government on 13 January 1972. In 1977, he was awarded a gold medal by the International Association of Trial Lawyers in recognition of his achievements. The NRC had been reorganized into the Supreme Military Council (SMC) in 1975 with General Acheampong still as the Head of state of Ghana. The Ghana Bar Association (GBA) later passed a vote of no confidence in his administration. Under pressure from the GBA, the SMC published a new decree, the Judicial Service (Amendment) Decree, 1977 (SMCD 101), retiring him from the office of Chief Justice. This decree, which named him specifically, had been added to the statute books just for his dismissal.^{[a]}

== Special Investigation Board ==
During the era of the Provisional National Defence Council (PNDC) of Jerry Rawlings, three judges and a retired army officer were abducted from their homes on 30 June 1982. Their bodies were found on 3 July 1982 at the Bundase Military Range, 50 kilometers from Accra. They had been murdered. All four had adjudicated on cases in which they had ordered the release of persons who had been sentenced to long terms of imprisonment, during the rule of the Armed Forces Revolutionary Council (AFRC) which had also been led by Jerry Rawlings in 1979. Following intense pressure on the PNDC government, a Special Investigation Board (SIB) was formed to investigate the murders. Samuel Azu Crabbe was appointed the Chairman of the SIB. Their work led to the recommendation that 10 persons be prosecuted. Two of them, Joachim Amartey Quaye and Alolga Akata-Pore were members of the PNDC. A third, a retired army captain, Kojo Tsikata, was a PNDC Special Advisor and Head of National Security. Throughout the investigation, the Ghanaian Times, a state-owned newspaper, ran a persistent campaign to discredit the process as well as the SIB members. Azu Crabbe and his family were subject to intimidation tactics, including having his electricity being cut off and calls being made to his daughter, who was in London (England) at the time, telling her that her father would soon be dead. Steadfast in his conviction and duty to nation, he refused to buckle to political pressure. Soon after the presentation of the Final Report, Azu Crabbe and Captain Tsikata engaged in exchanges in the public media over allegations of his (Crabbes's) supposed connection with the American CIA.

== Honours ==
In 1977, he was awarded Companion of the Order of the Volta for his service to Ghana.

== Death ==
Samuel Azu Crabbe died on 15 September 2005 at Aburi in the Eastern Region of Ghana. He left behind a wife, five children and nine grandchildren.

== Publications ==
- Crabbe, Samuel Azu (1998). Law of Wills in Ghana. Vieso Universial. ISBN 978-9988-0-1008-9.

== Notes ==
1. Judicial Service (Amendment) Decree, 1977 (SMCD 101)
  "1. Notwithstanding any enactment to the contrary, Mr. Justice S. Azu Crabbe, Chief Justice of Ghana is hereby retired as Chief Justice and shall cease to be a member of the Judicial Service of Ghana with effect from 15th day of June, 1977." "2. The said Mr. Justice S. Azu Crabbe shall notwithstanding that he has ceased to be a member of the Judicial Service, after the said date be allowed to enjoy all leave he had earned prior to that date, with full emoluments and benefits and he shall be eligible to all retiring benefits for which he would have been eligible as if he had retired voluntarily from the Judicial Service as Chief Justice on the said date."

== See also ==
- Chief Justice of Ghana
- List of judges of the Supreme Court of Ghana
- Supreme Court of Ghana

Legal offices
Preceded by Edmund A.L. Bannerman	Chief Justice of Ghana; 1973–1977	Succeeded by Fred Kwasi Apaloo
