= Fred Kwasi Apaloo =

6th Chief Justice of the Republic of Ghana & 8th Chief Justice of the Republic of Kenya

Frederick Kwasi Apaloo CV FGA JSC

Chief Justice of Kenya
- In office March 1993 – 1995
- Appointed by: Daniel arap Moi
- Preceded by: Alan Hancox
- Succeeded by: Abdul Majid Cockar

6th Chief Justice of Ghana (19th including Gold Coast)
- In office 1977–1986
- Appointed by: General Acheampong
- Preceded by: Samuel Azu Crabbe
- Succeeded by: E. N. P. Sowah

Supreme Court Judge
- In office 2 March 1964 – 24 February 1966
- Appointed by: Kwame Nkrumah
- In office 1971 – 13 January 1972
- Appointed by: Kofi Abrefa Busia
- In office 1980–1986
- Appointed by: Hilla Limann

Personal details
- Born: 9 January 1921 Woe, Gold Coast
- Died: 2 April 2000 (aged 79)
- Spouse: Georgina Kumasenu
- Education: Accra Academy
- Alma mater: University of Hull

Frederick Kwasi Apaloo CV FGA JSC (9 January 1921 – 2 April 2000) was a Ghanaian judge who served as Chief Justice of Kenya from 1993 to 1995 and Chief Justice of Ghana from 1977 to 1986. He is the only judge to have served on the Supreme Court of Ghana under three Ghanaian republics.

== Early life ==
Apaloo was born at Woe, a village near Keta in the Volta Region of Ghana, then the Gold Coast. He lost his father when he was 7 years old so an uncle who was a Kadjebi merchant cared for him through school. His secondary education was at Accra Academy which he graduated from in 1942. He subsequently read law at the University College, Hull Apaloo was called to the English bar in 1950 at Middle Temple.

== Career ==
Apaloo returned to practise law in Ghana after his studies in England. He defended those involved in the Anloga riots following widespread protests against the imposition of taxes by the British colonial administration. After Ghana attained its independence from British colonial rule, he was appointed a High Court Judge in 1960. In 1964, he presided over the treason trials of five persons including three close associates of President Kwame Nkrumah. They were Tawia Adamafio, information minister, Ebenezer Ako-Adjei, foreign minister and Hugh Horatio Cofie Crabbe, secretary of the ruling Convention People's Party. One of the other judges was Edward Akufo-Addo who also later became Chief Justice in 1966 and ceremonial President of Ghana in 1970. The acquittal led to the then president, Nkrumah trying to purge the judiciary. He was appointed to the Court of Appeal in 1966 and to the Supreme Court of Ghana in 1971.

== Chief Justice of Ghana ==
He was appointed Ghana's Chief Justice in 1977. He was the sixth person to hold this position since Ghana became an independent nation. This was during the era of the military Supreme Military Council of Ghana. On resumption of democratic rule under Hilla Limann in September 1979, the People's National Party government attempted to replace him as incumbent Chief Justice by insisting he be vetted for the office he already occupied. A Ghanaian citizen, Amoako Tuffuor, took the issue to the Supreme Court and the presiding judge, Justice E. N. P. Sowah, who succeeded him on his (Apaloo's) retirement, ruled that Apaloo became Chief Justice in the Third Republic as soon as the 1979 Ghanaian constitution came into force. He served through the third republic of Ghana and continued after the overthrow of the Limann government on 31 December 1981. Due to his independence, the new military government, the Provisional National Defence Council led by Jerry Rawlings also tried to remove him as Nkrumah had tried before but failed in 1983. He retired at the age of 65 years in 1986.

== Chief Justice of Kenya ==
Kenya had a vacancy for Chief Justice in 1993 with no obvious candidate to fill it so he was appointed as the Chief Justice of Kenya in March 1993. He was noted to be against the death penalty while he was in Kenya. He remained Chief Justice until 1995 when he was succeeded by Abdul Majid Cockar.

== Other positions ==
He also served on the World Bank Administrative Tribunal from 1990 until 1995.

== Personal life ==
Apaloo married Georgina Kumasenu in 1953. They had two sons and three daughters.

== Honours ==
- 1979 – Companion of the Order of the Volta (Ghana)
- 1986 -Elected a fellow of the Ghana Academy of Arts and Sciences
- 1993 – Elder of the Golden Heart (Kenya).

== Hobbies ==
Apaloo's hobbies included dancing, boating and golf and tennis.

== See also ==
- Chief Justice of Ghana
- List of judges of the Supreme Court of Ghana
- Supreme Court of Ghana

== Notes ==
Legal offices
Preceded by Samuel Azu Crabbe	Chief Justice of Ghana; 1977–1986	Succeeded by E. N. P. Sowah
Preceded by Alan Hancox	Chief Justice of Kenya; 1993–1995	Succeeded by Abdul Majid Cockar
