= Mahamudu Bawumia =

Vice-President of Ghana from 2017 to 2025

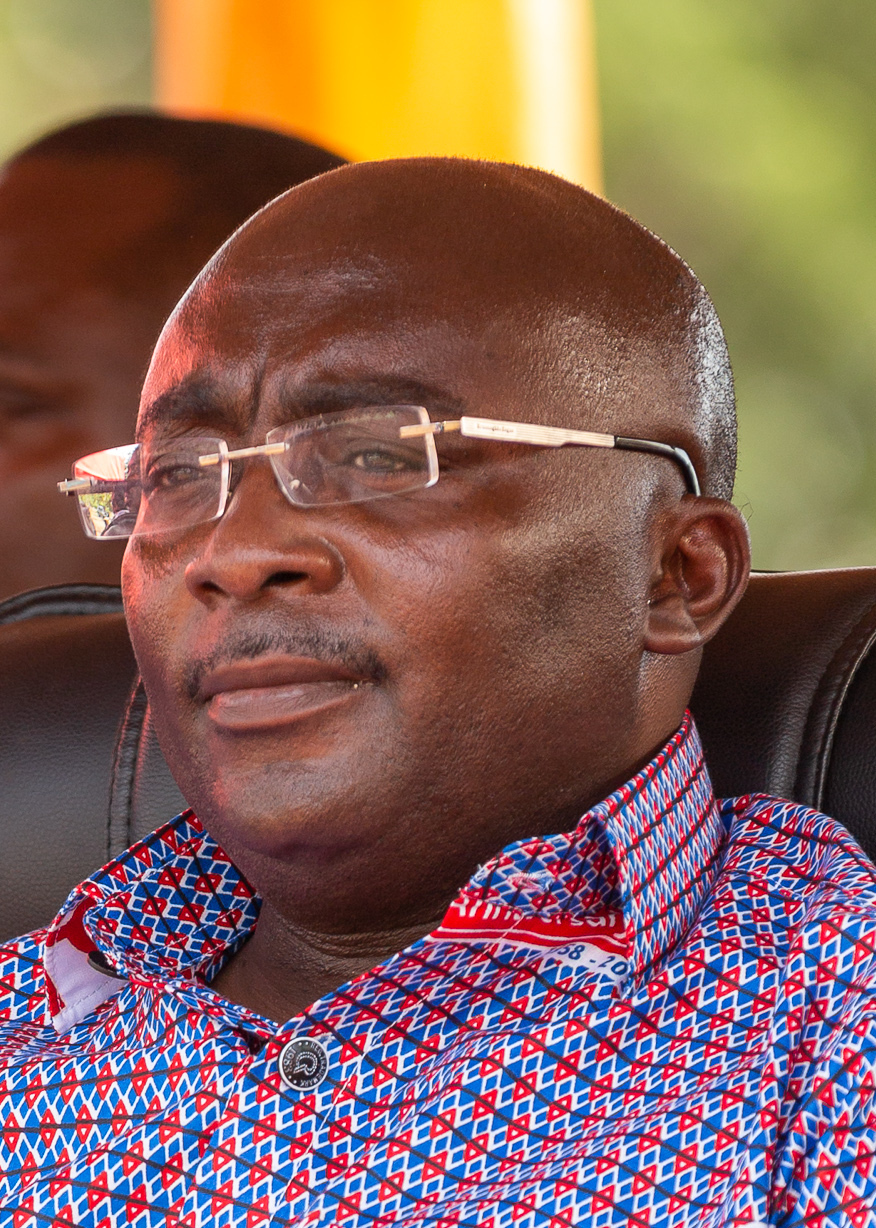
- Bawumia in 2017

7th Vice President of Ghana
- In office 7 January 2017 – 7 January 2025
- President: Nana Akufo-Addo
- Preceded by: Kwesi Amissah-Arthur
- Succeeded by: Jane Naana Opoku-Agyemang

Personal details
- Born: 7 October 1963 (age 62) Tamale, Northern Region, Ghana
- Party: New Patriotic
- Spouse: Samira Ramadan
- Relations: Mumuni Bawumia (father); Mariama Bawumia (mother)
- Children: 4
- Education: Buckingham University; Lincoln College, Oxford; Simon Fraser University
- Occupation: Economist, Politician

Mahamudu Bawumia (born 7 October 1963) is a Ghanaian politician and former central banker who served as the seventh vice president of Ghana from 7 January 2017 to 7 January 2025 under President Nana Akufo-Addo. He was the New Patriotic Party (NPP) nominee for president in the 2024 general election.

He also ran as the NPP vice-presidential candidate in the 2012 general elections and was the lead witness for the petitioners in the 2012/2013 Presidential Election Petition, which challenged the declaration of John Mahama as winner of the election. He holds a PhD in Economics from Simon Fraser University.

== Early life and education ==
A member of Mamprusi people, Bawumia was born in Tamale Ghana, to Alhaji Mumuni Bawumia and Hajia Mariama Bawumia. He is the twelfth of his father's 18 children and the second of his mother's five children.

Mahamudu Bawumia attended the Sakasaka primary school in Tamale and gained admission to Tamale Secondary School in 1975. After graduating from Tamale Secondary School, he went to the United Kingdom, where he studied banking and obtained the Chartered Institute of Bankers Diploma (ACIB). He was the president of the Ghana United Nations Students' Association (GUNSA) in 1981. He took a First Class Honours Degree in Economics at Buckingham University in 1987.

He then obtained a master's degree in economics at Lincoln College, Oxford, and obtained a PhD in economics at the Simon Fraser University, Vancouver, British Columbia, Canada in 1995. His areas of specialization include macroeconomics, international economics, development economics and monetary policy. He has numerous publications.

== Career ==
From 1988 to 1990, Bawumia worked as a lecturer in monetary economics and international finance at the Emile Woolf College of Accountancy in London; England. He also served as an intern at the Research Department of the International Monetary Fund in Washington, D.C. Bawumia also served as resident representative of the African Development Bank in Zimbabwe.

Between 1996 and 2000, Bawumia served as an assistant professor of economics in the Hankamer School of Business at Baylor University in Waco, Texas, and USA, where he received a Young Researcher Award in 1998. He was listed in "Who Is Who Among America's Teachers” in 1999. He also published two books on monetary policy and economic development.

Bawumia returned to Ghana in 2000 to work as an economist at the Bank of Ghana. He rose from Senior Economist to Head of Department and subsequently served as Special Assistant to the governor of the bank. President John Kufuor appointed Bawumia as deputy governor of the Bank of Ghana in June 2006.

At the Bank of Ghana, Mahamudu Bawumia

- Served as head of the Monetary Policy and Financial Stability Department, he was part of the team that designed and implemented the inflation-targeting framework that continues to guide monetary policy and the workings of the Monetary Policy Committee at the Bank of Ghana. The inflation-targeting framework established reduced inflation from over 40% in 2000 to 10.2% by 2007 (i.e., before the oil price shock of 2007/2008) while maintaining relative exchange rate stability.
- Was part of the team that was instrumental in designing and implementing policy initiatives, such as the abolition of the secondary reserve requirements and the opening up of the banking sector to competition. This resulted in a major increase in the availability of credit to the private sector from 12.5% of GDP in 2001 to 28.5% of GDP by 2008.
- Led the Bank of Ghana's technical negotiation team and was on the government team that negotiated with the World Bank and International Monetary Fund since 2001 through HIPC and PRGF. Partly as a result of these negotiations, Ghana by 2007 successfully ended its dependence on IMF assistance.
- Served as a member of the government technical negotiating team on HIPC Paris Club and Completion Point Negotiations. Ghana completed the HIPC process successfully with significant debt relief of close to $4 billion.
- Was a member of the Government Team to Negotiate the Millennium Challenge Account Compact with the US government. The MCA resulted in many significant projects, such as the George Bush Highway.
- Was a member of the Government Technical Team on the Deregulation of Ghana's Petroleum Sector.
- As chairman of the Capital Markets Committee, was responsible for the strategy for accessing the international capital markets with a debut US$750 million, which was four times oversubscribed.
- Was part of the team that designed and implemented the successful redenomination of the cedi. Through this process, the cedi was considerably strengthened. Significant savings were also made by the Bank of Ghana in currency printing costs.
- Was involved in the design and implementation of the e-zwich common platform for all banks, savings and loans companies and rural banks, offering interoperability across different financial institutions.
- As the deputy governor in charge of financial stability, oversaw the soundness of the banking sector.
- As deputy governor, Bawumia served on the Boards of the Bank of Ghana, Ghana International Bank (UK), Ghana Telecom, Revenue Agencies Governing Board, Social Security and National Insurance Trust.

Shortly before the 2008 election, Bawumia resigned as deputy governor at the Bank of Ghana.

=== 2008 elections ===
Mahamudu Bawumia was running mate to the New Patriotic Party candidate in the 2008 elections, Nana Akufo-Addo. The NPP increased its share of the vote compared to 2004 in all the three Northern Regions, in both the first and second round.

=== 2008–2011 ===
Bawumia served as a consultant to the Economic Commission of Africa between February and March 2009. Between April and October 2009, he was a visiting scholar at the University of British Columbia Liu Centre for Global Studies and UBC Fisheries Centre.

In October 2009, he was appointed as a Fellow of the International Growth Centre (IGC), a research institute based jointly at the London School of Economics and Political Science and Oxford University that provides advice on economic growth to governments of developing countries, specifically serving as an IGC Team Member for Sierra Leone. He also served as an advisor to the Central Bank of Sierra Leone on the redesigning of the organizational structure of the bank and its monetary policy framework.

Between October 2009 and October 2010, he was a senior research associate at the Centre for the Study of African Economies at the Department of Economics, University of Oxford. In January 2011, Bawumia was appointed resident representative of the African Development Bank for Zimbabwe by the African Development Bank. He served in this position until reappointed as the vice-presidential candidate to Nana Akufo-Addo on the ticket of the New Patriotic Party for Ghana's 2012 presidential election.

=== 2012 elections ===
Bawumia was re-nominated as the Vice-Presidential Candidate to Nana Akufo-Addo for the 2012 General Elections in March 2012.

The party won 10 seats in the Northern Region including Yendi, Walewale, Yagaba – Kubore, Bunkpurugu, Bimbilla, Chereponi, Kpandai, Tatale – Sanguli, Tolon and Zabzugu. It also won the Nabdam and Talensi Constituencies in the Upper East Region. Overall, Nana Akufo-Addo and Bawumia lost the presidential elections to John Dramani Mahama.

=== 2016 elections ===
Nana Akuffo-Addo appointed Bawumia as his running mate in the 2016 presidential election.

=== 2024 elections ===
On Friday, 16 June 2023, Bawumia filed his nomination to contest in the NPP Presidential primaries. As part of the presidential primaries, Bawumia picked the tenth position after balloting for the selection of five contest for the final selection of the presidential candidate for the NPP in the 2024 election. Bawumia, on 26 August 2023, won the super delegates congress election by the New Patriotic Party with 68%, beating nine other candidates in the build up to the party’s national delegates congress to elect their flagbearer.

Bawumia has been elected to lead the New Patriotic Party (NPP) for Election 2024 as flagbearer. Bawumia won NPP presidential primary with 61.43% of total valid votes cast which happened on 4 November 2023 at 276 constituencies across the country and the Party Headquarters, Asylum Down, Accra.

On Tuesday, 9 July 2024, Bawumia unveiled Dr. Matthew Opoku Prempeh as his running mate for the 2024 general elections. The unveiling took place at Jubilee Park in Kumasi.

On 8 December 2024, Bawumia conceded defeat to former President John Mahama in an address to the media at his residence.

== Personal life ==
Bawumia is married to Samira Bawumia and they have four children. He is a member of the Mabia (Mossi-Dagbon) ethnicity, shares same heritage with influential figures as Thomas Sankara, Alhassane Ouattara, Haruna Iddrisu, among others. He is a Muslim. Bawumia was named after Yaa Naa Mahamadu Bila, a king of Dagbon who ruled from 1948 to 1953. The name Bawumia means "They have heard" in Dagbanli and Gmampruli languages. An avid sports fan, he is a supporter of English club Tottenham Hotspur.

== Philanthropy ==
The Vice President is known for several philanthropic works. In October 2020, he formally commissioned an ultramodern mosque built and fully funded by him for use by the people of Prang in the Bono East area. Dr. Bawumia had earlier in June same year settle over nearly 6 decades land lease arrears for the Kumasi Central Mosque.

In September 2021, Bawumia pledged GHS 1,500 monthly stipend to Psalm Adjeteyfio to take care of his rent and upkeep. In May 2022, Dr. Bawumia donated an amount of GHs 20,000.00 to a taxi driver who returned missing GHs 8,400.00 to the owner. In October 2021, Dr. Bawumia celebrated his 58th birthday with inmates of the Weija Leprosarium. In October 2022, he celebrated his birthday with cured lepers from the Weija Leprosarium and in October 2023, he celebrated his 60th birthday with the orphans at the Kumasi Children's Home.

== Other activities ==
- Global Partnership for Sustainable Development Data, Member of the Board of Directors (since 2017)

== Selected works ==
- "Monetary Policy And Financial Sector Reform In Africa: Ghana's Experience by Mahamudu Bawumia (31 August 2010).
- "The Determination of Bank Interest Spreads in Ghana: An Empirical Analysis of Panel Data" with Martin Ofori and Franklin Belnye, September 2005.
- "Developing a Composite Indicator of Economic Activity in Ghana", with Benjamin Amoah, Bank of Ghana Working Paper, February 2004.
- "A Simple Vector Error Correction Forecasting Model for Ghana", with Joseph Atta-Mensah, Bank of Ghana Working Paper, August 2003.
- "Monetary Growth, Inflation and Exchange Rate Policy in Ghana" Research Department, Bank of Ghana, Journal of the West African Monetary Institute, 2003.
- "The Transmission Mechanism for Monetary Policy in Ghana", with Philip Abradu-Otoo, Bank of Ghana Policy Paper, August 2003.
- "The Determinants of Exchange Rates in Ghana", with Zakari Mumuni. Bank of Ghana Working Paper. March 2003.
- "The Feasibility of Monetary Union in West Africa". Mimeo. Economic Commission for Africa, November 2002.
- "Comparative Institutional Features of Different Common Central Banks", West African Monetary Institute. Mimeo. February 2002.
- "Designing an Exchange Rate Mechanism for the West African Monetary Zone", West African Monetary Institute. Mimeo. February 2002.
- "Explaining African Economic Growth Performance: The Case of Ghana", with Ernest Aryeetey and A. Fosu. Paper prepared for the African Economic Research Consortium. April 2001.
- "Assessing the effectiveness of Intervention on the Foreign Exchange Market in Ghana". Research Department, Bank of Ghana, February 2000.
- "A Review of the Literature of the Impact of Financial Sector Liberalisation on the Poor", with Dr E.K.Y. Addison and Maxwell Opoku Afari, Research Department, Bank of Ghana, August 2000.
- "Financial Markets in Africa. Issues and Challenges for Research," with Professor Ernest Aryeetey, ISSER. October 2000 AERC .
- "Currency Substitution and Money Demand in Ghana: A Cointegration Analysis". Research Department, Bank of Ghana, November 2000.
- "Why the Apparent Rush to Market Reform?" Journal of Economics, 1999.
- "The Sequencing of Fiscal Reform during Structural Adjustment. Lessons from Ghana, Uganda, and Zimbabwe", Comparative Economic Studies, Vol. XXXVIII No.2/3 Summer-Fall 1996.
- "A Closer Look at The Distributional Impact of Ghana’s Structural Adjustment Program (1983–1992). Journal of Modern African Studies. Vol.36 No.1, March 1998.
- "Estimating the Aggregate Values of Human Capital in Sub- Saharan Africa", co-authored with Samuel A.Laryea. Review of Human Factor Studies. Vol. III No.1. June 1997.
- "Africa, the Challenge of Development". Book Chapter in Stephen. Gardner's Comparative Economic Systems, Dryden 1999.

== Initiatives ==
The Digital Ghana Agenda, led by the Vice President, Mahamudu Bawumia has brought enormous transformation to the country, which include;

- Mobile Money Interoperability
- National Identification System (Ghana Card)
- National Health Insurance App
- Digitisation of the National Lotteries Authority
- Digitsed Procurement Platform for the Public Procurement Authority
- Digitized motor insurance database
- Ghana.Gov (Platform to allow MMDAs to offer digitized services to citizens from a single portal)
- E-Pharmacy and Telehealth Services App
- Electrical Buses official launch

== Scholarships and awards ==
- 2007 — Fellow of the Chartered Institute of Bankers (FCIB).
- 2000 — Who Is Who Among America's Teachers? – Baylor University.
- 1999 — Young Researcher Award: Baylor University, Texas, USA.
- 1995–1999 — President's Research Fellowship: Ph.D. Simon Fraser University.
- 1991–1995 — 4 Graduate Fellowships: Ph.D. Simon Fraser University, Canada.
- 1986 Sir Alan Peacock Prize. Best Economics Student, Department of Economics, University of Buckingham, United Kingdom.
- June 2019, Dr. Bawumia was adjudged Digital Leader of the Year at the 9th Ghana Information Technology and Telecom Awards (GITTA)

Political offices
Preceded by Kwesi Amissah-Arthur	Vice President of Ghana; 2017—2025	Succeeded by Jane Naana Opoku-Agyemang
