= Philip Edward Archer =

Ghanaian judge

Philip Edward Archer MSG JSC

8th Chief Justice of Ghana
- In office 1991–1995
- Appointed by: Jerry Rawlings
- Preceded by: E. N. P. Sowah
- Succeeded by: Isaac Kobina Abban

Personal details
- Born: 25 February 1925 Accra
- Died: 10 May 2002 (aged 77)

Philip Edward Archer MSG JSC (22 February 1925 – 10 May 2002) was the Chief Justice of Ghana between 1991 and 1995. He was the eighth person to hold this position since Ghana became an independent nation. He died on 10 May 2002.

== Life ==
Philip Edward Archer was born 22 February 1925, Abontiakrom, Tarkwa. He was educated at St Peter's School in Sekondi, Adisadel College, Cape Coast and the University of Nottingham in England. Admitted a solicitor of the Supreme Court of Judicature of England and Wales in 1957, he returned to Ghana and joined the office of the Registrar-General. Appointed registrar-general in 1959 and judicial secretary in 1961, he became a High Court judge in 1964 and a Supreme Court judge in 1980. He was pro-chancellor and chairman of the University of Cape Coast Council from 1979 to 1983. Retiring as a judge in 1983, he was appointed full-time chairman of the Law Reform Commission. Chief Justice from 1991 until 1995, he was made a member of the Council of State in 1995. In 2000 he was honoured with the Order of the Star of Ghana. He died at the Korle Bu Teaching Hospital on 10 May 2002.

== See also ==
- Chief Justice of Ghana
- List of judges of the Supreme Court of Ghana
- Supreme Court of Ghana

Preceded by E. N. P. Sowah	Chief Justice of Ghana; 1991–1995	Succeeded by Isaac Kobina Abban
