= Isaac Kobina Abban =

Ghanaian judge (1933–2001)

Isaac Kobina Donkor Abban JSC

9th Chief Justice of Ghana (21st including Gold Coast)
- In office 22 February 1995 – 21 April 2001
- Appointed by: Jerry Rawlings
- Preceded by: Philip Edward Archer
- Succeeded by: Edward Kwame Wiredu

Chief Justice of Seychelles
- In office 1990–1993
- Appointed by: France-Albert René
- Preceded by: Earle Edward Seaton
- Succeeded by: Durai Karunakaran

Electoral Commissioner of Ghana
- In office 1978–1978
- President: General I. K. Acheampong
- Preceded by: Military rule
- Succeeded by: Joseph Kingsley-Nyinah

Personal details
- Born: 14 May 1933 Agona Nkum, Central Region, Gold Coast
- Died: 21 April 2001 (aged 67) Accra, Ghana
- Education: Mfantsipim School; University of Nottingham

Isaac Kobina Donkor Abban JSC (14 May 1933 – 21 April 2001) was the Chief Justice of Ghana between 1995 and 2001. He was the ninth person to hold this position since Ghana became an independent nation.

== Early life and education ==
Abban was born in 1933 at Agona Nkum in the Central Region. He had his secondary education at Mfantsipim School from 1948 to 1951. He left for the United Kingdom to study law at the University of Nottingham.

== Career ==
Abban was called to the English bar on 24 June 1958. He returned to Ghana in 1959 and entered private practice until he was called to the bench of the High Court in May 1970.

== Electoral Commissioner ==
Justice Abban was called to the Ghanaian bar on 18 April 1959. While a High Court Judge, he was appointed the electoral commissioner and supervised the controversial 'Union Government (UNIGOV)' referendum on 30 March 1978 during the Supreme Military Council (SMC) era. At a point during the referendum, he went into hiding in fear of his life from the military authorities. This was because he opposed the attempts to rig the UNIGOV referendum by the military SMC government. His successor Justice Kinsgley Nyinah supervised the 1979 election that saw Dr Limann win to become president of Ghana.

== Chief Justice ==
Abban left for Seychelles where he served as the Chief Justice from 1990 to 1993. On his return to Ghana, he rejoined the Judicial Service of Ghana and was appointed to the Supreme Court of Ghana. On 22 February 1995, he was appointed Chief Justice by the President, Jerry Rawlings.

== Death ==
Justice Abban was due to retire on 1 May 2001, for health reasons. He died a few days before that on 21 April 2001 in Accra, Ghana at the age of 67.

== See also ==
- Chief Justice of Ghana
- List of judges of the Supreme Court of Ghana
- Supreme Court of Ghana
- Judiciary of Ghana
- Electoral Commission of Ghana

New title	Electoral Commissioner of Ghana; 1978	Succeeded by Joseph Kingsley-Nyinah
