= Vice President of Ghana =

Political role in Ghana

Vice President of the Republic of Ghana
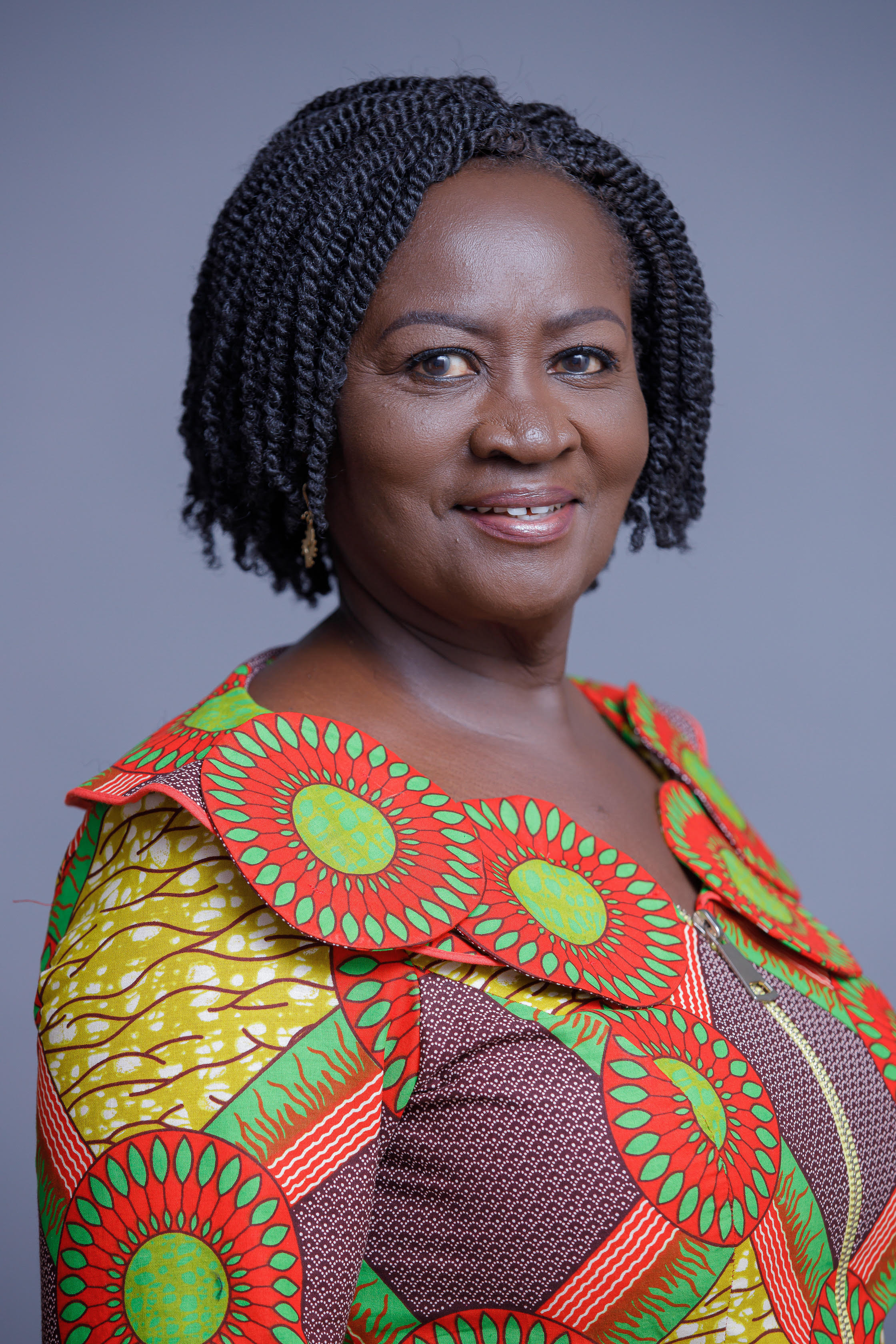
- Incumbent; Jane Naana Opoku-Agyemang since 7 January 2025
- Style: His/Her Excellency
- Residence: Golden Jubilee House
- Term length: Four years, renewable once
- Inaugural holder: Joseph W.S. deGraft-Johnson; Republic established Kow Nkensen Arkaah; Current Constitution
- Formation: Republic Day; 1 July 1960; 1992 Constitution; 15 May 1992
- Salary: unknown
- Website: (in English) Presidency.gov.gh (in English) Ghana.gov.gh

The vice president of Ghana is the second-highest officer in the Government of Ghana. The vice president, together with the president of Ghana, is directly elected by the people through popular vote to serve a four-year term in office. The vice-president is the first person in the presidential line of succession, and would ascend to the presidency upon the death, resignation, or removal of the president. The current vice-president is Jane Naana Opoku-Agyemang, who took office on 7 January 2025, under President John Mahama. She is the first female vice president in Ghana's history.

== Eligibility ==
The provisions of article 62 of the 1992 Constitution apply to a candidate for election as vice-president. The candidate must be:

- (a) a citizen of Ghana by birth
- (b) attained the age of thirty-five years or above
- (c) be otherwise qualified to be elected a Member of Parliament, except that the disqualifications set out in paragraphs (c), (d), and (e) of clause (2) of article 94 of this Constitution shall not be removed, in respect of any such person, by a presidential pardon or by the lapse of time as provided for in clause (5) of that article.

The president and vice president are elected on a single ticket; all presidential candidates must lodge the name of their running mate when filing for election.

If the president dies, resigns, or is permanently incapacitated, the vice-president automatically ascends as president for the balance of the term. A vice-president who ascends to the presidency before half of the presidential term expires is only allowed to run for a single full term. If more than half of the term has expired, he can run for two terms, whether successive or separated.

This provision has been used once, when John Mahama ascended to the presidency after the death of the president, John Atta Mills, in July 2012. He was elected president in his own right that December, and was allowed to run for reelection in 2016 since he had ascended with only six months remaining in Mills' term.

== Oath of office ==
The vice-president of Ghana must be sworn in by the chief justice before the citizens of Ghana at Independence Square in Accra. The vice-president-elect must repeat the following:

"I,(name) having been elected to the office of Vice-President of the Republic of Ghana, do (in the name of the Almighty God swear) (solemnly affirm) that I will be faithful and true to the Republic of Ghana; that I will at all times preserve, protect and defend the Constitution of the Republic of Ghana; and I dedicate myself to the service and well-being of the people of the Republic of Ghana and to do right to all manner of persons.

I further (solemnly swear) (solemnly affirm) that should I at any time break this oath of office, I shall submit myself to the laws of the Republic of Ghana and suffer the penalty for it. (So help me God)."

== Duties ==
The duties of the vice-president of Ghana are:

- presiding over various meetings in the absence of the president
- acting president when the president is out of the country

The vice-president is also a member of

- The National Security Council
- The Armed Forces Council
- The Police Service Council
- The Prisons Service Council

== List of vice-presidents of Ghana (1979–present) ==
No.	Portrait	Name (Birth–Death)	Term of office			Political party	President
No.	Portrait	Name (Birth–Death)	Took office	Left office	Time in office	Political party	President
1		Joseph W.S. de Graft-Johnson (1933–1999)	24 September 1979	31 December 1981 (Deposed)	2 years, 98 days	People's National Party	Hilla Limann
2		Kow Nkensen Arkaah (1927–2001)	7 January 1993	7 January 1997	4 years	National Convention Party	Jerry Rawlings
3		John Atta Mills (1944–2012)	7 January 1997	7 January 2001	4 years	National Democratic Congress	Jerry Rawlings
4		Aliu Mahama (1946–2012)	7 January 2001	7 January 2009	8 years	New Patriotic Party	John Kufuor
5		John Mahama (born 1958)	7 January 2009	24 July 2012	3 years, 199 days	National Democratic Congress	John Atta Mills
6		Kwesi Amissah-Arthur (1951–2018)	6 August 2012	7 January 2017	4 years, 154 days	National Democratic Congress	John Mahama
7		Mahamudu Bawumia (born 1963)	7 January 2017	7 January 2025	8 years	New Patriotic Party	Nana Akufo-Addo
8		Jane Naana Opoku-Agyemang (born 1951)	7 January 2025	Incumbent	1 year, 270 days	National Democratic Congress	John Mahama

== Vice presidents by time in office ==
Rank	Vice president	Political party	Total time in office	Cause of end of term
1	Aliu Mahama	New Patriotic Party	8 years	Natural expiration
1	Mahamudu Bawumia	New Patriotic Party	8 years	Natural expiration
3	Kwesi Amissah-Arthur	National Democratic Congress	4 years, 154 days	Natural expiration
4	Kow Nkensen Arkaah	National Convention Party	4 years	Natural expiration
4	John Atta Mills	National Democratic Congress	4 years	Natural expiration
6	John Mahama	National Democratic Congress	3 years, 199 days	Death of John Atta Mills
7	Joseph de Graft-Johnson	People's National Party	2 years, 98 days	Deposed
8	Jane Naana Opoku-Agyemang	National Democratic Congress	1 year, 270 days	In office

=== Demographics ===
Vice-President	Ethnicity	Religious affiliatiom
Joseph W. S.Johnson	Fante (Akan)	Methodist
Kow Nkensen Arkaah	Senya Beraku (Guan)	Methodist
John Atta Mills	Fante (Akan)	Methodist
Aliu Mahama	Dagomba	Muslim
John Dramani Mahama	Gonja	Assemblies of God (raised Presbyterian)
Kwesi Amissah-Arthur	Fante (Akan)	Methodist
Mahamudu Bawumia	Mamprusi	Muslim
Jane Naana Opoku-Agyemang	Fante (Akan)	Methodist

Order of precedence
Preceded by John Mahama; President of Ghana	Jane Naana Opoku-Agyemang; Vice President of Ghana	Succeeded by Alban Bagbin; Speaker of Parliament of Ghana
