= Sisan River =

Urban river in Kumasi, Ghana

Sisan River Sisa River; Susan River

Location
- Country: Ghana
- Region: Ashanti Region
- City: Kumasi

Physical characteristics
- Source
  - location: Kenyase, Ejisu-Juaben area, Ashanti Region, Ghana
- Mouth: Ofin River
  - location: South of the Eastern By-Pass, Kumasi, Ashanti Region, Ghana

Basin features
- River system: Kumasi urban drainage system
- Cities: Kumasi
- Tributaries
  - right: Aboabo River, Wiwi River

The Sisan River, also referred to in some sources as the Sisa River or Susan River, is an urban river in Kumasi, the capital of the Ashanti Region of Ghana. It forms part of the drainage network of the Kumasi Metropolitan Area and passes through densely developed residential, commercial and industrial areas. A disaster-risk profile prepared for UNDP Ghana describes the river as taking its source from Kenyase in the Ejisu-Juaben area before entering Kumasi from Duase and Sepe Timpon, then flowing southwards through the industrial areas of Asokwa, Ahensan and Kaase.

The river is one of the four main drainage basins of Kumasi, together with the Subin, Aboabo and Wiwi basins. It is significant in the urban hydrology of Kumasi because it receives tributary flows from other urban streams, supports parts of the city's drainage system and has been associated with flooding, water pollution, industrial activity, urban agriculture and public-health risk.

== Course and drainage ==
The Sisan River takes its source from Kenyase in the Ejisu-Juaben area of the Ashanti Region. It enters Kumasi from Duase and Sepe Timpon and then follows a southward course through Asokwa, Ahensan and Kaase. The UNDP Ghana risk profile also reports that the river drains into the Ofin River just south of the Eastern By-Pass.

The river receives flows from other urban watercourses in Kumasi. The Aboabo River joins the Sisan River at Asokwa, while the Wiwi River joins it at Ahensan after flowing through the Kwame Nkrumah University of Science and Technology campus. These tributary connections make the Sisan an important receiving channel within the south-eastern and central drainage network of Kumasi.

The Sisan basin is part of Kumasi's wider drainage system. The city's four main drainage basins drain northern and central portions of the metropolis and are affected by rapid urban development and inadequate drainage facilities. As an urban river, the Sisan functions both as a natural watercourse and as a stormwater channel receiving runoff from residential, commercial and industrial areas.

== Urban setting ==
The Sisan River passes through several highly urbanised parts of Kumasi. Its course is linked to neighbourhoods and urban areas such as Duase, Sepe Timpon, Asokwa, Ahensan, Kaase, Amakom and Atonsu. The river's passage through industrial and densely settled areas exposes it to stormwater runoff, solid waste, sewage, informal settlement pressure and industrial discharges.

Kumasi's urban expansion has increased pressure on its rivers and floodplains. Built-up surfaces reduce infiltration and increase stormwater runoff, while construction close to channels may restrict river flow. The UNDP Ghana risk profile identified urbanization of catchments, blocking of main river channels by construction, garbage, silt and vegetation, and settlement close to rivers as major factors behind high flood hazard in the Kumasi pilot district.

The Sisan River is therefore closely tied to Kumasi's urban-planning and drainage challenges. Its condition reflects the combined effects of land-use change, drainage maintenance, waste management, floodplain settlement and water-quality protection in a fast-growing secondary city.

== Water quality and pollution ==
The Sisan River has been studied for water-quality deterioration and potential health risk. A study in 2021 investigated the suitability of the Sisa River in the Kumasi Metropolis and assessed physicochemical parameters, microbial indicators, heavy metals, water-quality index values and human health risks for children and adults.

The study reported that some samples from the river showed alkaline conditions, and that turbidity, alkalinity, colour, microbial counts, iron and chromium exceeded World Health Organization permissible limits in some cases. Water samples also contained Escherichia coli, total coliforms and faecal coliforms, indicating microbial contamination.

The same study found that water quality index values ranged from 97.95 to 137.22 percent, with about 75 percent of the samples classified as poor quality. Principal component analysis identified geogenic and anthropogenic sources as factors influencing the river's physicochemical and microbiological conditions. The authors recommended proper water-management strategies and policies to protect the river and related water resources.

== Sources of contamination ==
Pollution in the Sisan River is linked to both local and catchment-wide urban activities. In the Sisa River study, both geogenic and anthropogenic sources were identified as contributors to the observed water-quality patterns.

Sampling sites used in the chemical analysis of Kumasi freshwater bodies included locations along the Sisa River where surrounding activities included liquid waste from gutters, car washing, deposition of solid waste, refuse dumping, human and animal excreta, and small-scale food processing activities. These activities create pathways through which nutrients, microorganisms, sediments and metals can enter the river.

The river's location within a developed urban area also makes it vulnerable to stormwater pollution. During rainfall, runoff from roads, settlements, markets, workshops and industrial zones can wash refuse, oils, sediments, faecal matter and other pollutants into the river channel.

== Flooding ==
The Sisan River is associated with recurrent flooding in Kumasi. The UNDP Ghana risk profile identified Amakom as a hotspot community located along the Sisan River, also described locally as Sisan Akyi. Local accounts recorded in the report indicated that flooding occurs three to four times a year when the river breaks its banks and inundates the community.

The same report stated that the river was blocked by debris and silt downstream and that floodwaters could rise up to about one metre above floor level in affected houses. The report identified reduced discharge capacity of the river channel as one of the reasons for high flood hazard along the Sisan River, noting that waste deposits, silt, vegetation and inadequate maintenance reduce the ability of the channel to carry floodwater.

Flooding along the river has also been reported by Ghanaian news media. In July 2009, the Ghana News Agency reported that about 200 residents at Bomso in the Kumasi Metropolis were displaced after a downpour affected people living along the Susan River. The report stated that refuse dumping in the river impeded the watercourse and contributed to flooding.

In May 2019, the Daily Graphic reported that the Susan River in the Asokwa Municipality overflowed its bank and flooded homes, with Atonsu S-Line described as one of the worst affected areas. In October 2021, flood reports from Kumasi also referred to the Sisan or Susan stream at Asabi Junction and to residents of Sawaba New Site calling for the river to be dredged.

== Flooding and flood mapping ==
The Sisan River has been used as a case study in flood modelling and inundation mapping under the name Susan River. Research conducted in 2012 studied river inundation and hazard mapping for the Susan River in Kumasi using geographic information systems, spatial technology and the HEC-RAS hydraulic model.

The study modelled the river's watershed to support flood assessment and mapping. It used a digital elevation model, land-cover classification and hydraulic modelling to estimate inundation patterns and generate flood-hazard maps. The work is relevant to urban planning because low-lying areas along the river are exposed to flooding when the channel capacity is exceeded or when waste, silt and vegetation restrict flow.

== Management and mitigation ==
Management of the Sisan River requires action on drainage maintenance, waste control, sanitation, land-use planning, water-quality monitoring and flood-risk reduction. The UNDP Ghana risk profile identified waste deposition, siltation, vegetation growth and inadequate maintenance as factors reducing the discharge capacity of river channels in Kumasi.

Flood mitigation measures relevant to the river include desilting, clearing of blocked channels, control of dumping into drains, removal of obstructions, protection of river reserves and relocation or protection of settlements in high-risk flood areas. News reports on flooding along the Susan River have also referred to residents calling for dredging and improved river maintenance after repeated flooding.

Water-quality management measures include preventing untreated wastewater and refuse from entering the channel, controlling industrial effluent, improving sanitation facilities, monitoring heavy metals and microbial contamination, and enforcing environmental standards. The health-risk assessment of the Sisa River recommended proper water-management strategies and policies to protect the river and reduce risks to people using or exposed to the water.

== See also ==
- Kumasi
- Aboabo River
- Subin River
- Wiwi River
- Ofin River
- Urban stream
- Urban flooding
- Water pollution
- Stormwater
- Floods in Ghana
