= Tetteh =

Tetteh is both a surname and a given name. Notable people with the name include:

Surname:

- Abdul Aziz Tetteh (born 1990), Ghanaian footballer
- Alfred Tetteh (born 1975), Ghanaian boxer
- Andrews Tetteh (born 2001), Greek footballer
- Benjamin Tetteh (born 1997), Ghanaian footballer
- David Tetteh (born 1985), Ghanaian-Kyrgyz footballer
- David Tetteh (boxer) (born 1971), Ghanaian boxer
- Emmanuel Tetteh (born 1974), Ghanaian footballer
- Ezekiel Tetteh (born 1992), Ghanaian footballer
- Hanna Tetteh (born 1967), Ghanaian barrister and politician
- Joe Tetteh (1941–2002), Ghanaian boxer
- Michael Tetteh (born 1989), Ghanaian footballer
- Osah Bernardinho Tetteh (born 1996), Ghanaian footballer
- Sellas Tetteh (born 1956), Ghanaian footballer and manager
- Sly Tetteh (died 2011), Ghanaian footballer and manager
- Stephen Tetteh (born 1982), Ghanaian footballer
- Sulemanu Tetteh (born 1992), Ghanaian boxer

Given name:

- Tetteh Adzedu (born 1949), Ghanaian fashion designer
- Tetteh Nortey (born 1990), Ghanaian footballer
- Tetteh Quarshie (1842–1892), Ghanaian agriculturalist
