= Prempeh College =

All-males senior high school in Kumasi, Ghana

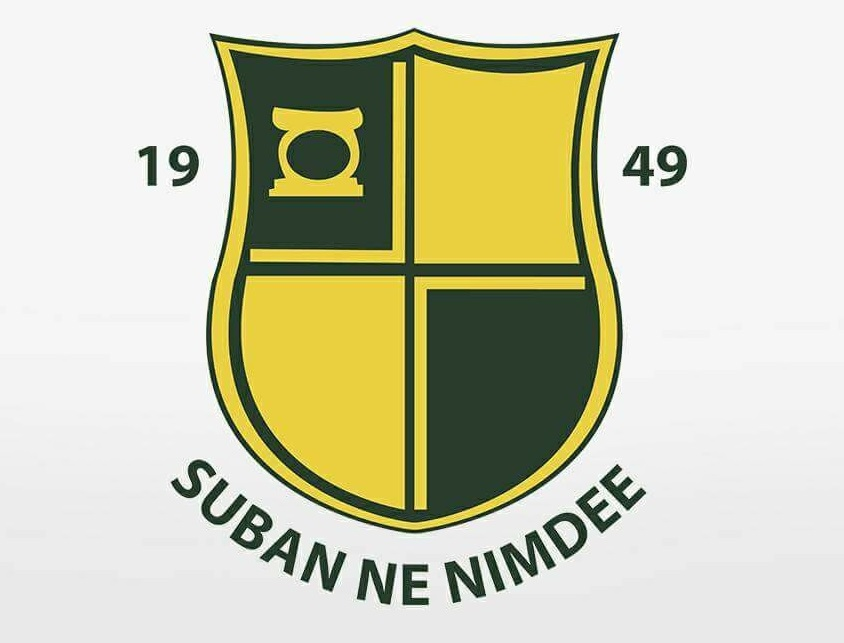

Location
- Ashanti Region; Ghana; 6°42′13″N 1°38′50″W

Information
- Type: All-boys' public boarding school
- Motto: Akan: Suban ne Nimdeε (Character and Integrity)
- Religious affiliations: Presbyterian Church of Ghana; Methodist Church Ghana
- Established: 1949; 77 years ago
- Board chairman: Benjamin Acolatse
- Headmaster: Rev Lewis Asare
- Gender: Boys
- Age: 13 to 19
- Enrolment: 4520
- Houses: 11
- Colours: Green and Gold
- Song: Arise and shine
- Nickname: Amanfoɔ
- Publication: The Stool
- Alumni: Amanfour
- Website: www.prempeh.com

Prempeh College is a public secondary boarding school for boys located in Kumasi, the capital city of the Ashanti Region, Ghana. The school was founded in 1949 by the Asanteman traditional authority, the British Colonial Government, the Methodist Church Ghana and the Presbyterian Church of Ghana. The school is named after the King of Ashanti (Asantehene), Sir Osei Tutu Agyeman Prempeh II, who donated the land on which the school was built, and was modeled on Eton College in England.

The school topped matriculation at the Kwame Nkrumah University of Science and Technology in 2004, with 441 students admitted, and in 2012, with 296 students from the college admitted.This remains the highest number of matriculants from the same senior high school. The school has won the National Robotics Championships a record five times between 2013 and 2021. In 2016, Prempeh College won the Toyota Innovation Award at the International Robofest World Championships held in Michigan, USA.

== History ==
In the early 1940s, the British Colonial Government invited the Presbyterian and Methodist Churches, which had already established schools in the Southern zone based on their experience, to help set up a school in the middle belt of Ghana to serve the northern sector of the country. Although there were some delays due to the Second World War, Prempeh College was designed in 1948 by British modernist architects Maxwell Fry and Jane Drew.

Compared to other works by Jane Drew in the Ashanti region, Prempeh College campus was designed to incorporate modernist refinements, as described by Lain Jackson and Jessica Holland in their book titled The Architecture of Edwin Maxwell Fry and Jane Drew: Twentieth Century Pioneer Modernism and the tropics.

According to the Ashanti Pioneer newspaper, the opening ceremony of Prempeh College was held on 5 February 1949, when Major C. O. Butler, the chief commissioner of Ashanti, said in an address:

"There is a great and growing need for training men to take up posts of responsibility not just as clerks in offices but in Agricultural Education, Mining, Forestry, Architecture, Engineering and Building in the many other technical posts on the fulling of which by Africans the future development of Ashanti and the Gold Coast as a whole largely depends … We British from overseas are here to help you ultimately to administer the country yourselves … until you yourselves can provide the agriculturalists, engineers, the technicians and the tradesmen who can develop the natural resources of your country."

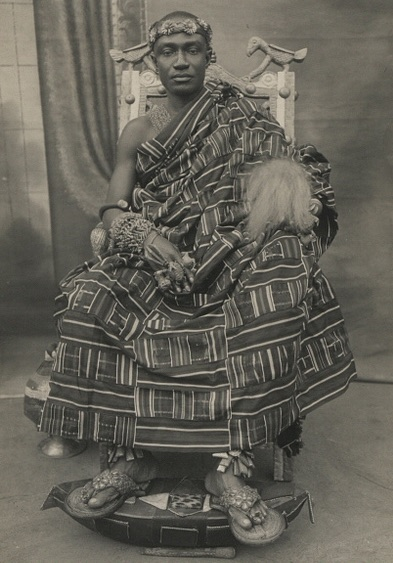
Asantehene Prempeh II, benefactor of the college

As of 2012, the headmaster was E. K. Yeboah, a member of CHASS.

== Uniform ==
The school uniform includes a green shirt with the college crest along with a brown short(Awura abena). Students wear this to class on a daily basis. For ceremonial purposes, students wear a green jacket with embroidery of the college crest. The college blazer (suit) was in use from the beginning in 1949, was dropped in the 1980s, and was revived in 2003. Students wear the college suit for ceremonial purposes, such as speech days and graduation ceremonies.

== School magazine ==
The magazine of Prempeh College has long been called The Stool. It is a 100-page document that gives annual reports for the school. With a patron, an editorial board, and the SRC, they deliver the magazine to the student body. What is featured, for example, are perceptions about the school from outside, short messages from students of the college to other schools, interviews with alumni, and other features.

Pronunciation

== Achievements ==
National Debate champions 2004 with President John Kuffour (an alumnus).

Prempeh College was the first school to win the National Science and Maths Quiz in 1994 and 1996. The College also won the 2015, 2017 and 2021 editions of the Ghana National Science and Maths Quiz that makes them one of the most successful schools in the National Science and Maths Quiz competitions, and the most successful in the Ashanti Region. Prempeh College has also won the Ghana National Debate Championship competition a record two times, in 1997 and 2004. The school won the 4th edition of the Luv Fm High School Debate Competition in 2023 and have been to the finals three consecutive times in 2021, 2022 and 2023 making them the best debating school in Ashanti Region. Prempeh College is the first secondary institution in Ghana and Africa to win the World Robofest 2016, or World Robotics Competition, beating giants from China, Japan and other industrialized countries. They won the Toyota Innovation Award that year and are the only school from Africa to have done so. Prempeh College Robotics Club has also won a number of other robotics awards over the years. Some of their achievements include: 2016 Ashanti Regional Robotics Champions, Robofest Toyota Innovation Award Champions 2016, Robofest National Champions 2016, National Robotics 2015, National Robotics Champions 2014, Regional Robotics Champions 2013, winners of the Regional Robotics Competition 2012, Achievement in Best Programming at the Robotics Inspired Science Education Competition 2011, The 2016 National Robofest Qualifiers, Presec-Legon, Ghana Champions. The school represented Ghana at the World robotics olympiad in New Delhi India. The school also represented Ghana at the World Robotics Online Competition, where the school amassed a total of 22 trophies. A total of three teams were presented by the school, with the teams 1st, 3rd, and 5th spots in the competition. The school became the first ever to win the competition for a second consecutive time, having won the prior competition in Michigan. However, the 2020 edition was held online due to the impact of COVID-19 on travelling.

=== Notable alumni ===
- Mohammed Abdul-Saaka, deputy minister in the second republic
- Baffour Adjei-Bawuah, diplomat
- Sam Adjei, physician
- Samuel Yaw Adusei, former deputy Ashanti Regional Minister
- Jot Agyeman, author, actor, playwright and media executive
- Kwesi Ahwoi, former Minister for the Interior of Ghana.
- Francis Amanfoh, diplomat
- Abednego Feehi Okoe Amartey, Vice-Chancellor of the University of Professional Studies
- Joseph Amoah, sprinter representing Ghana at the 2019 World Athletics Championships and national record holder in the men's 200 metres
- Osei Bonsu Amoah, MP for Akwapim South Constituency
- Richard Twum Aninakwah, Justice of the Supreme Court of Ghana (2004–2008)
- Julius Ansah, Ghanaian judge who served as a Justice of the Supreme Court of Ghana from 2004 to 2020
- Yaw Appau, active Justice of the Supreme Court of Ghana (2015–2021)
- Nana Bediatuo Asante, Ghanaian Lawyer
- Kwame Baah, Ghanaian soldier and politician; formerly Minister for Lands and Mineral Resources, Minister for Foreign Affairs, and Minister for Economic Planning during the Acheampong regime.
- Hon Kwadwo Baah-Wiredu, Ghanaian politician Former Minister of Education
- Fritz Baffour, television producer and media consultant is the managing director of Tropical Visionstorm Limited
- Kofi Boahene, physician
- Edward Boateng, Ghana Ambassador to China
- Nana Osei Bonsu II, the traditional ruler of Ashanti Mampong
- Yussif Chibsah, footballer
- Dr. Kwabena Duffuor, former Governor Bank of Ghana, Finance Minister, founder UniBank Ghana
- Maxwell Kofi Jumah, former mayor of Kumasi
- Sadat Karim, footballer
- John Kufuor, former president of the Republic of Ghana
- Osagyefo Kuntunkununku II- Okyenhene
- Joakim Lartey, percussionist
- Kwame Saarah-Mensah, former diplomat and politician
- Kwadwo Mpiani, former Chief of Staff and Minister for Presidential Affairs
- Martin Osei Nyarko, footballer
- Michael K. Obeng, Ghanaian American, plastic surgeon
- Dominic Oduro, footballer
- Kwaku Ohene-Frempong Ghanaian - American paediatric haematologist-oncologist and an expert in sickle cell disease (SCD)..
- Prof. Kwadwo Asenso Okyere, former Vice Chancellor, University of Ghana, Legon, former head of Food and Agriculture, UNO
- Edmund Owusu-Ansah, footballer
- Dr. Matthew Opoku Prempeh, MP for Manhyia South and Minister for Energy, Ghana
- Kwadwo Afoakwa Sarpong, former Ghanaian diplomat
- Kwabena Sarpong-Anane, acting Director General of the Ghana Broadcasting Corporation (2010–2011)
- Tonyi Senayah, Chief Executive Officer of Horseman Shoes
- Kwaku Sintim-Misa Ghanaian actor, director, satirist, talk show host, and author.

== See also ==
- List of boarding schools
- List of senior high schools in the Ashanti Region
