= Aboabo River (Kumasi) =

Urban river in Kumasi, Ghana

Location
- Country: Ghana
- Region: Ashanti Region
- City: Kumasi

Physical characteristics
- Source
  - location: Tafo-Pankrono, Kumasi, Ashanti Region, Ghana
- Mouth: Sisan River
  - location: Asokwa, Kumasi, Ashanti Region, Ghana
- Length: 6.05 km (3.76 mi)

Basin features
- River system: Kumasi urban drainage system
- Tributaries
  - right: Owusu Ansa stream, Dichemso stream

The Aboabo River is an urban river in Kumasi, the capital of the Ashanti Region of Ghana. It forms part of the drainage network of the Kumasi Metropolitan Area and flows through densely settled parts of the city. The river rises around Tafo-Pankrono in northern Kumasi and flows southwards to meet the Sisan River at Asokwa.

The river is one of Kumasi's important urban watercourses because of its role in stormwater drainage and its location within a heavily built-up catchment. Academic and disaster-risk studies have examined the river in relation to water pollution, land-use pressure and annual flooding in the Kumasi metropolis.

== Course and basin ==
The Aboabo River originates from the Tafo-Pankrono area in the northern part of Kumasi and flows southwards through the city. A disaster-risk profile prepared for UNDP Ghana described the river as joining the Sisan River at Asokwa. The same report identified the Owusu Ansa and Dichemso streams as major tributaries of the Aboabo River.

The river has a reported length of about 6.05 km. The UNDP Ghana risk profile reported that the channel is about 2.5 metres wide upstream and about 30.5 metres wide downstream, with an average flow speed of 0.87 m/s. Settlements identified within the river basin include Pankrono, Moshie Zongo, Buokrom, New Tafo, Dichemso, Aboabo, Anloga, Amakom, Manhyia, Asokwa and Atonsu.

The Aboabo basin is one of the main drainage basins of Kumasi. A disaster-risk report on Kumasi identified four main drainage basins in the city: the Subin, Aboabo, Sisan and Wiwi basins. These basins drain northern and central parts of Kumasi and are affected by the city's rapid infrastructure development and drainage constraints.

== Urban setting and land use ==
Urbanization in the catchment affects runoff, drainage capacity and the river's exposure to pollution. The UNDP Ghana risk profile noted that urbanization of Kumasi's catchments reduces infiltration and increases runoff, while blocked channels, construction, garbage, silt and vegetation contribute to flood hazards in the city. These pressures make the Aboabo River both a natural watercourse and part of Kumasi's urban stormwater system.

== Flooding ==
The Aboabo River basin is associated with recurrent flooding in Kumasi. Oppong's 2011 thesis on environmental hazards in Ghanaian cities examined annual floods along the Aboabo River in the Kumasi Metropolitan Area. The study focused on communities including Anloga, Dichemso, Aboabo and Amakom, and found that flooding in the basin affected life and property.

Oppong identified both natural and human factors behind flooding in the basin. The thesis linked flooding to increases in average temperature, annual rainfall and seasonal rainfall over the preceding thirty years, while also identifying poor land use, unplanned settlement development and indiscriminate disposal of refuse into and along the banks of the river as human causes. The study reported socioeconomic effects including loss of life and property, financial problems and health problems among inhabitants of the basin.

Flood events in the Aboabo area have also been reported in Ghanaian news media. In July 2015, the Daily Graphic reported that President John Dramani Mahama had announced plans to desilt the Aboabo River following heavy rains in Kumasi. The report stated that the river had burst its banks in the Aboabo suburb, spilling floodwaters into homes. The same report stated that an old bridge over the river was to be replaced to allow freer water flow.

A 2018 conference paper on urban wetlands and floods in Ghana referred to the Aboabo River overflowing its banks in Kumasi on 27 June 2015 and causing deaths. Flooding around Aboabo is part of a wider pattern of urban flood risk in Kumasi, where drainage channels, wetlands and built-up settlements interact during heavy rainfall.

== Management and mitigation ==
Studies and reports on the Aboabo River have proposed several responses to reduce pollution and flood risk. Pollution-focused recommendations include enforcement of environmental by-laws, improvement of sanitation facilities, public education and stronger local leadership in environmental management. Flood-focused recommendations include proper waste disposal, enforcement of planning regulations, protection of river reserves, resettlement away from high-risk locations, desilting and construction or improvement of drainage channels.

The 2015 desilting announcement followed flooding in Kumasi and was presented as a short-term measure to improve channel capacity and reduce flood risk. Long-term management of the river basin depends on maintaining drainage channels, preventing waste disposal into the river, controlling construction along the channel and improving sanitation and solid-waste systems in settlements within the catchment.

== See also ==
- Kumasi
- Aboabo
- Sisan River
- Subin River
- Wiwi River
- Urban flooding
- Water pollution
- Drainage basin
