= Subin River =

Urban river in Kumasi, Ghana

Location
- Country: Ghana
- Region: Ashanti Region
- City: Kumasi

Physical characteristics
- Source
  - location: North of Kumasi, Ashanti Region, Ghana
- Mouth: Daban stream
  - location: Sokoban, Kumasi, Ashanti Region, Ghana
- Basin size: 230 km^{2} (89 sq mi)
- Discharge
  - average: 0.243 m^{3}/s (8.6 cu ft/s)

Basin features
- River system: Kumasi urban drainage system
- Cities: Kumasi

The Subin River is an urban river in Kumasi, the capital of the Ashanti Region of Ghana. It forms part of the drainage network of the Kumasi Metropolitan Area and flows through the commercial centre of the city. A disaster-risk profile prepared for UNDP Ghana describes the river as rising from a spring north of Kumasi, flowing southwards through central Kumasi and suburbs such as Asafo, passing towards the Kaase industrial area, and joining the Daban stream at Sokoban.

The river is one of the main drainage systems of Kumasi. The UNDP Ghana risk profile identifies four main drainage basins in the city: the Subin, Aboabo, Sisan and Wiwi basins. The Subin basin covers about 230 km^{2} (89 sq mi), and the river has a reported mean flow rate of 0.243 m^{3}/s (8.6 cu ft/s).

The Subin River has been studied because of its exposure to urbanisation, industrial activity, commercial development, sewage, solid waste, heavy metals and microbial pollution. Research on the river has examined land-use pressure along its buffer, health-related microbiology, sediment contamination and physicochemical water quality.

== Course and basin ==
The Subin River rises from a spring north of Kumasi and flows southwards through the commercial centre of the city. Its course passes through or near important urban and commercial areas, including Asafo, before continuing towards the Kaase industrial area and joining the Daban stream at Sokoban.

The river is located within one of Kumasi's four main urban drainage basins. These drainage basins drain northern and central portions of the city and are affected by rapid infrastructure development, increased runoff and inadequate drainage facilities. Because the Subin passes through dense urban and commercial areas, it functions both as a natural watercourse and as part of Kumasi's stormwater drainage system.

== Urban setting and land use ==
The Subin River flows through a highly urbanized part of Kumasi. Its catchment includes commercial activities, transport corridors, industrial areas, settlements and informal land uses. Research on land-use activities along the Subin and Aboabo rivers found that activities close to the rivers were influenced by proximity to markets, access to cheaper land, availability of water and closeness to places of work.

A study in 2012 reported encroachment along river buffer zones and identified land-use conflict as a major issue affecting the Subin and Aboabo rivers. The study linked urban land-use pressure to the loss of green buffer zones and exposure of the riverbanks to human activities.

A later study in 2022 on ecologically sensitive areas in Kumasi selected the Subin River as an urban water body because of its location within central Kumasi and the distinctive land uses around it. The study found weak enforcement of regulations protecting water bodies and noted that commercial activities and squatter settlements along the Subin River did not comply with the standard setback distance of 100 feet stated in Ghana's zoning and planning standards.

== Pollution ==
The Subin River is affected by pollution from urban and human activities. Earlier microbiological research described the river as receiving the effects of urban waste, sewage and other human-centred activities as it flows through Kumasi. The river receives pollution from residential, commercial and industrial areas, including solid waste, untreated wastewater and runoff from built-up surfaces.

A 2022 study by Darko and colleagues examined the water and sediment quality of three major rivers that drain Kumasi: the Wiwi, Subin and Suntre rivers. The study linked physicochemical parameters, heavy metals, polycyclic aromatic hydrocarbons, pesticide residues and microbial loads in the rivers to human activities at the riverbanks.

The study found that sediments in the three rivers were polluted with petrogenic and pyrogenic polycyclic aromatic hydrocarbons, and it identified the Subin as the most polluted of the three rivers studied. River Subin recorded benzo[e]pyrene concentrations of up to 47,169 µg/kg in sediment samples. The study also found that the rivers were highly contaminated with metals such as cadmium, chromium, mercury and arsenic, and concluded that the three water bodies were not suitable for recreational and irrigation purposes.

== Microbiological water quality ==
The microbiological quality of the Subin River has been a subject of public-health research. A study conducted monitored three sites on the river over one year: Racecourse, Asafo amongst others. The study assessed total coliforms, faecal coliforms, enterococci and biochemical oxygen demand.

The researchers found that bacterial loading increased consistently as the river flowed from its source at Racecourse through Kumasi. Bacterial numbers were significantly higher during the rainy season than during the dry season. Biochemical oxygen demand ranged from 8 mg/L at the source of the river to 419 mg/L at Asago, and none of the sampled sites met internationally accepted standards for water quality.

The findings are important because communities downstream of Kumasi have been reported to use the river for direct drinking water and other domestic purposes. The study linked the river's microbiological condition to urban waste, sewage and human activities along its course.

== Heavy metals and sediment contamination ==
Heavy metals in the Subin River and its surrounding environment have been examined in several studies. Apau and colleagues assessed heavy metals in sediments, physicochemical parameters and microbial load in the river. Sampling locations included Racecourse upstream and downstream, Asafo, Abinkyi upstream and downstream, Kaase, Asokwa and Wood Village.

The study reported that the river was highly polluted by Escherichia coli, faecal enterococci, total coliforms and faecal coliforms, with microbial pollution generally increasing downstream as more domestic and industrial effluents entered the river. Its sediment analysis suggested high contamination by silver and cadmium, moderate pollution by lead and cobalt, and high levels of several metals, including silver, cadmium, chromium, copper, iron, mercury, cobalt and zinc.

Soil studies along the Subin River have also recorded heavy-metal concerns. Kodom, Wiafe-Akenten and Boamah used X-ray fluorescence analysis to assess surface soils along the river in Kumasi. Such findings point to the river's role as a receiving environment for pollutants from industrial, commercial and urban sources.

== Flooding and drainage ==
The Subin River is linked to flood risk in Kumasi. UNDP Ghana's disaster-risk profile identified Anwomeso as a hotspot community located along the Subin River. The report stated that the area suffers from regular flooding and that local accounts described flooding three to four times per year when the river breaks its banks.

The same report noted that the river was blocked by silt and vegetation in the Anwomaso area. These blockages reduce drainage capacity and can worsen flooding in nearby communities. The flood problem is also connected to dense settlement close to riverbanks, inadequate drainage infrastructure and increased runoff from built-up surfaces.

The Subin's flood role reflects a wider urban drainage issue in Kumasi. The city's rivers and streams drain highly developed areas, and flood hazards increase where channels are narrowed, blocked or encroached upon by buildings and informal activities.

== Management and conservation ==
Management of the Subin River requires coordinated action on drainage maintenance, waste control, pollution regulation, land-use planning, river-buffer protection and water-quality monitoring. Studies on the river point to several related concerns: the discharge of untreated waste, encroachment into buffer zones, industrial and commercial pressure, microbial contamination, heavy metals and flood risk.

Land-use studies recommend stronger enforcement of buffer-zone regulations around urban water bodies in Kumasi. Pollution studies suggest that the river requires urgent management measures to reduce further deterioration of its water quality. Flood-risk studies point to desilting, vegetation removal where it blocks channels, protection of river reserves and better drainage planning as important mitigation measures.

Because the river passes through the commercial and industrial heart of Kumasi, its restoration would require collaboration between the Kumasi Metropolitan Assembly, environmental regulators, industries, market authorities, traditional authorities, residents and downstream communities. Long-term management would also require public education, enforcement against dumping, wastewater treatment, stormwater management and regular monitoring of sediments and water quality.

== See also ==
- Kumasi
- Subin, Kumasi
- Aboabo River
- Wiwi River
- Sisan River
- Daban River
- Urban stream
- Water pollution
- Urban flooding
- Stormwater
