= Wiwi River =

Urban river in Kumasi, Ghana

Wiwi River Wewe River

Location
- Country: Ghana
- Region: Ashanti Region
- City: Kumasi

Physical characteristics
- Source
  - location: Kumasi, Ashanti Region, Ghana
- Mouth: Sisan River
  - location: Ahensan, Kumasi, Ashanti Region, Ghana
  - coordinates: 6°39′40″N 1°35′38″W

Basin features
- River system: Kumasi urban drainage system
- Landmarks: Kwame Nkrumah University of Science and Technology

The Wiwi River, also referred to in some sources as the Wewe River, is an urban river in Kumasi in the Ashanti Region of Ghana. It forms part of the drainage system of the Kumasi Metropolitan Area and is one of the watercourses associated with the Kwame Nkrumah University of Science and Technology (KNUST) campus. The river is significant because of its role in urban drainage, campus ecology, irrigation, wastewater reception, public health studies and biodiversity research.

The Wiwi River is located in the south-eastern part of Kumasi. A disaster-risk profile prepared for UNDP Ghana describes the river as flowing in a south-westerly direction through the KNUST campus before joining the Sisan River at Ahensan. The same report identifies Wiwi as one of the four main drainage basins of Kumasi, together with the Subin, Aboabo and Sisan basins.

The river has received academic attention because of its links to urbanisation, pollution, agriculture, wetland use and public health. Studies have examined its microbiological water quality, its association with schistosomiasis infection among schoolchildren, the impact of wastewater and land use, and the response of aquatic and riparian invertebrate communities to disturbance.

== Course and location ==
The Wiwi River drains part of south-eastern Kumasi and passes through the KNUST campus. UNDP Ghana's disaster-risk profile states that the river flows south-westwards through KNUST and joins the Sisan River at Ahensan. The river is part of Kumasi's urban drainage system, which contains several rivers and streams that drain northern and central parts of the city.

Other studies and project reports describe the river as passing through or near communities such as Kotei, Ayeduase, Ayigya and Ahensan, as well as the KNUST campus. A conservation project report on the Wewe River noted that the river provides household and irrigation water for nearby communities and supports a riparian zone within the university environment.

The river's location inside and around an urban university environment gives it a distinctive character. It functions both as a natural watercourse and as part of a heavily modified urban hydrological system shaped by campus development, nearby settlements, farms, drains and wastewater flows.

== Drainage and urban setting ==
Kumasi has an extensive network of rivers and streams. The Wiwi basin is one of the city's main drainage basins, alongside the Subin, Aboabo and Sisan basins. These basins drain northern and central portions of the city and are affected by rapid urban development, inadequate drainage capacity and increased runoff from built-up surfaces.

Urbanisation around the Wiwi River has increased pressure on the river corridor. Built-up land, agriculture, wastewater discharge, stormwater runoff and encroachment into ecologically sensitive areas affect the river and its associated wetlands. Research on land-use activities around surface water bodies in Kumasi has identified weak enforcement of buffer regulations and growing development pressure along urban rivers, including the Wiwi and Subin rivers.

The river's urban setting is central to its environmental condition. Where natural vegetation is removed or drainage channels carry greywater and refuse, the river becomes more exposed to sediment, nutrients, pathogens and other pollutants. The condition of the Wiwi River reflects the wider challenge of managing water bodies in fast-growing African cities where settlement expansion, land scarcity and weak enforcement of planning standards place pressure on river buffers and wetlands.

== Water use and irrigation ==
The Wiwi River and its riparian area support several local uses. Reports and studies describe the river as a source of water for household use, irrigation and nearby farming activities. The SAVE THE FROGS! Ghana project report noted that the river provides household and irrigation water for communities around KNUST and nearby settlements.

The use of polluted urban water for vegetable farming is a common challenge in cities where farmers rely on nearby drains, streams or rivers to maintain production during dry periods. In the case of the Wiwi River, this issue is especially relevant because research has identified microbiological contamination levels that make the water unsuitable for domestic use and for irrigation of vegetables consumed raw.

== Water quality and pollution ==
The microbiological quality of the Wiwi River has been examined in detail. A study in 2014 assessed water quality along the river's longitudinal gradient by sampling five locations bi-weekly from November 2012 to February 2013. The study tested for total coliforms, faecal coliforms, Escherichia coli, Salmonella species and faecal enterococci.

The study found that microbial contamination varied across the river and generally increased downstream. The most upstream sampling site recorded the lowest coliform counts, while downstream areas showed higher microbial loads. The authors concluded that microbial counts in the river exceeded the WHO guideline used in the study, making the water unsuitable for domestic use and for irrigation of vegetables intended for direct consumption.

The pollution of the Wiwi River is not only a local environmental problem. It has implications for food safety, urban agriculture, public health, aquatic biodiversity and the management of university and community landscapes. The river shows how urban water bodies can become receiving systems for waste when wastewater infrastructure, drainage maintenance and land-use control are weak.

== Ecology and biodiversity ==
The Wiwi River supports riparian and aquatic habitats within the KNUST landscape. A conservation project report by SAVE THE FROGS! Ghana described the Wewe River as providing critical habitat for at least 12 amphibian species on the KNUST campus. The report noted that amphibian populations along the river had declined because of farming, fuelwood extraction and illegal sewage disposal.

The same project report identified the KNUST Botanical Garden, the Faculty of Renewable Natural Resources demonstration farm and the Wewe riparian zone as important habitat areas. Surveys recorded amphibians in the riparian zone, arboretum and farm areas, while restoration work involved the removal of invasive weeds and planting of native tree species within the KNUST riparian wetland.

The river has been studied through aquatic macroinvertebrates. A study in 2021 examined benthic invertebrate assemblages in the Wewe River under different habitat conditions and seasons. The study divided the river into intact, moderately disturbed and severely disturbed zones, and sampled during wet and dry seasons.

The benthic invertebrate study is significant because aquatic macroinvertebrates are widely used as indicators of freshwater ecosystem health. The researchers found that habitat condition and season influenced invertebrate assemblages in the river. Their work shows that the ecological condition of the Wiwi River varies along the river continuum and reflects the effects of disturbance, urban development and land-use change.

== Riparian zone and wetland functions ==
The riparian zone of the Wiwi River provides ecological and hydrological functions. Vegetation along the river can help stabilise banks, reduce erosion, filter runoff, provide habitat for amphibians and invertebrates, and support small-scale farming. The SAVE THE FROGS! Ghana project report described the Wewe riparian zone as a habitat with vegetation structure that supports wildlife within the KNUST landscape.

Urban wetland research in Kumasi shows that many wetlands in the city face encroachment, weak institutional support and competing land uses. A study in 2021 found that urban wetlands in Kumasi provide ecosystem services but are affected by residential, civic and recreational encroachment, weak institutional coordination and pressures from the urban land market.

These findings are relevant to the Wiwi River because its riparian and wetland areas are located within a rapidly urbanising environment. Protecting the river corridor requires water-quality management, control of land uses within the buffer zone, restoration of vegetation and cooperation between traditional authorities, public agencies, the university and nearby communities.

== Research and educational significance ==
The Wiwi River is important as a research and teaching site because of its location within the KNUST campus and its exposure to several urban environmental pressures. Studies on the river have contributed to knowledge on microbiological water quality, wastewater impacts, schistosomiasis, amphibian conservation, benthic invertebrate ecology and land-use pressures in Kumasi.

The river provides a practical case for understanding urban ecology in a secondary African city. It links campus planning, community water use, wastewater management, river health, public health and biodiversity conservation. For students and researchers, the Wiwi River offers a living laboratory for studies in environmental science, public health, aquatic ecology, urban planning, sanitation and water-resource management.

The river's research value strengthens its importance for public education. Conservation activities along the Wewe River have included amphibian surveys, restoration work and awareness campaigns involving students and nearby communities. Such work shows how urban rivers can be used for research, environmental learning and local conservation action.

== Management and conservation ==
Management of the Wiwi River requires coordinated action on wastewater treatment, solid-waste control, riparian restoration, land-use regulation, water-quality monitoring and public education. Studies on the river point to the need for better sanitation infrastructure and stronger control of activities that degrade water quality and riverbank habitats.

One priority is the improvement of wastewater treatment and the prevention of untreated wastewater from entering the river. This includes maintaining treatment plants, managing greywater, preventing illegal discharge and monitoring the quality of effluent entering wetlands and river channels.

A second priority is the protection of the riparian zone. Farming, tree cutting, construction and dumping along the riverbank can reduce habitat quality, increase erosion and expose the river to pollutants. Restoration activities such as invasive-weed removal, native tree planting and vegetation corridor protection can improve ecological conditions and support amphibians, invertebrates and other wildlife.

A third priority is regular water-quality and biodiversity monitoring. The river has already been studied through microbiological indicators, benthic invertebrates and amphibian surveys. Continued monitoring can help assess whether management interventions are improving river health and reducing public-health risks.

== Flood ==
Heavy rainfall resulted in heavy flooding in several areas of the Kwame University of Science and technology (KNUST) making movement difficult and posing safety risk to students and staff.

== See also ==
- Kumasi
- Kwame Nkrumah University of Science and Technology
- Bibini River
- Sisan River
- Subin River
- Aboabo River
- Urban stream
- Water pollution
- Schistosomiasis
- Stormwater
- Wastewater treatment
