= Richard Twum Aninakwah =

Supreme Court Judge

Supreme Court Judge
- In office 15 October 2004 – 28 January 2008
- Appointed by: John Kufuor

Personal details
- Born: Richard Twum Aninakwah; 28 January 1938 (age 88)
- Died: Kumasi
- Resting place: Ejisu Besease
- Parent: John Aninakwah later known as Nana Ofori Komahene II
- Education: Prempeh College
- Profession: Judge

Richard Twum Aninakwah is a retired Ghanaian Supreme Court Judge. He served on the Supreme Court bench from 2004 to 2008.

== Biography ==
Aninakwah was born on 28 January 1938. He had his secondary education at Prempeh College and at school was a contemporary of John Agyekum Kufuor, former President of Ghana.

He was nominated in 2004 and was vetted on 15 September 2004. He was sworn into office together with Justice Felix Michael Lartey and Justice Julius Ansah on 15 October 2004. He retired on 28 January 2008 at the mandatory retirement age of 70 years.

== See also ==
- List of judges of the Supreme Court of Ghana
- Supreme Court of Ghana
