= Kaaseman F.C. =

- Full name: Kaaseman Stars Football Club
- Ground: in Sefwi-Kaase, Ghana
- Chairman: (Ghana) Kwame Twumasi-Ankrah
- League: GAFCOA

Kaaseman F.C. is a Ghanaian football club based in Sefwi-Kaase, Ghana. The club are competing in the GAFCOA. The club is run by Prempeh College's Mr. Asare Lartey, and the Owarean sports master in Orlando, Florida, United States, which also operates Kaaseman F.C. in Kumasi, Ghana.

== Notable players ==
- Kwadwo Asamoah
- Patrick Nyarko
- Martin Osei Nyarko
