= Kwadwo Asamoah =

Ghanaian footballer (born 1988)

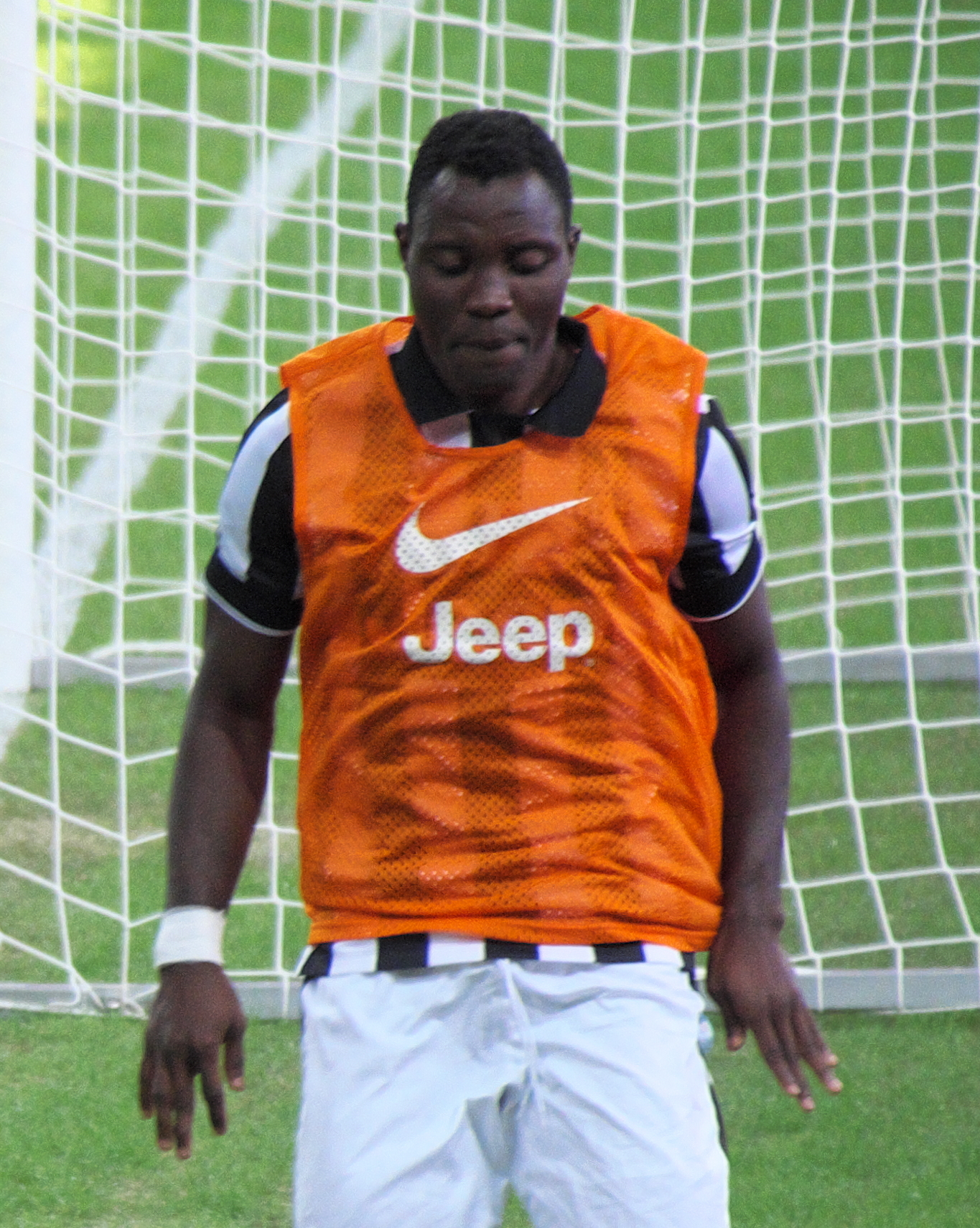
- Asamoah warming up for Juventus in 2014

Personal information
- Full name: Kwadwo Asamoah
- Date of birth: 9 December 1988 (age 37)
- Place of birth: Kumasi, Ghana
- Height: 1.73 m (5 ft 8 in)
- Positions: Left midfielder; left-back; central midfielder

Youth career
- 2005–2006: Kaaseman
- 2006–2007: Liberty Professionals
- 2008: Bellinzona
- 2008: → Torino

Senior career*
Years	Team	Apps	(Gls)
2008–2012	Udinese	114	(8)
2012–2018	Juventus	116	(4)
2018–2020	Inter Milan	40	(0)
2021	Cagliari	9	(0)
Total		279	(12)

International career
2009–2019	Ghana	74	(4)
Medal record
Representing Ghana
Men's football
Africa Cup of Nations
Runner-up	2010 Angola
- * Club domestic league appearances and goals

Kwadwo Asamoah (/kwəˈdʒoʊ æsəˈmoʊ.ɑː/, kwə-JOH ass-ə-MOH-ah; born 9 December 1988) is a Ghanaian former professional footballer. Mainly a left midfielder or left-back, he was also occasionally deployed as a central midfielder.

Asamoah began his professional career with Italian club Udinese in 2008. His consistent performances earned him a transfer to Juventus in 2012, where, with his energy, versatility, and technical skills, he played a key role in helping the club to six consecutive Serie A titles between 2013 and 2018, among other titles, although his appearances at the club were limited by injuries during his later seasons. He joined Inter Milan in 2018, and Cagliari in 2021. At international level, Asamoah represented Ghana in four Africa Cup of Nations tournaments, and two FIFA World Cups.

Asamoah was awarded CAF Most Promising African Player in 2010 and named Ghana Player of the Year twice consecutively for 2012 and 2013. In 2013, Asamoah was ranked as the 27th best footballer in the world by Bloomberg.

== Club career ==
=== Early career ===
Asamoah was born in Accra, Ghana. He was scouted playing for a local based club, and was recommended to Alhaji Sly Tetteh, former CEO of Liberty Professionals. He joined Swiss club Bellinzona and was loaned to Italian side Torino in the winter of 2007–08.

=== Udinese ===
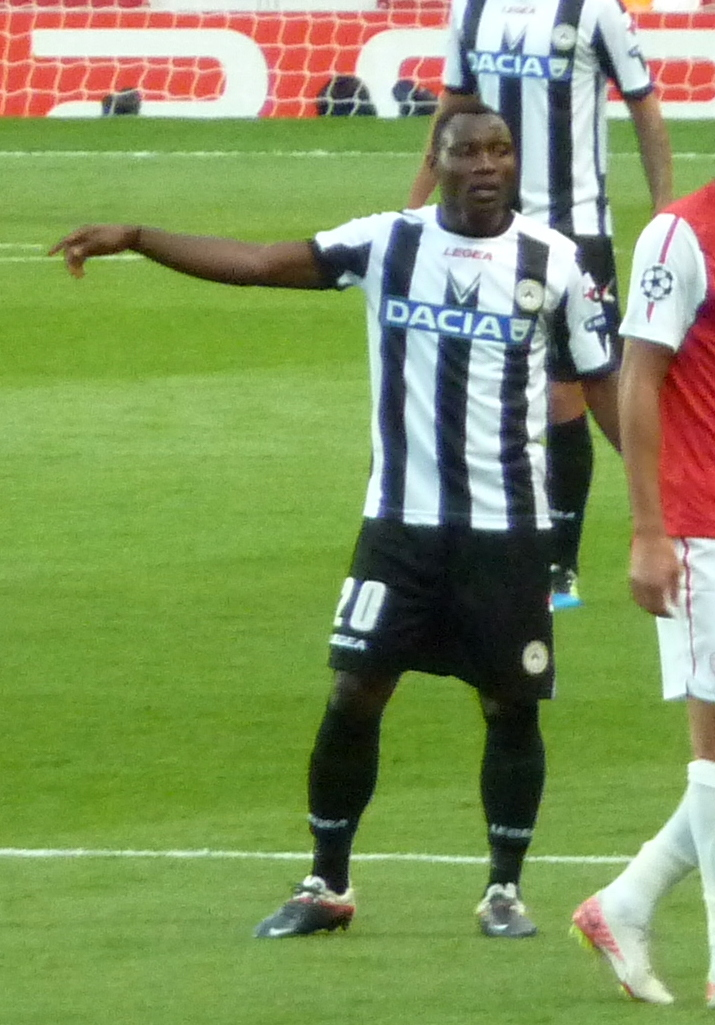
Asamoah playing for Udinese in the 2011–12 UEFA Champions League play-off versus Arsenal F.C.

In June 2008, Asamoah was signed by Serie A club Udinese where he established himself and became a linch pin for both club and country. After some good performances at the 2010 World Cup and Africa Cup of Nations, he became a target of top clubs in Europe.

=== Juventus ===
Asamoah and Udinese teammate Mauricio Isla both joined Juventus in July 2012 on co-ownership agreements, with Juventus paying €9 million for 50% of Asamoah's contract. He made his debut on 11 August 2012 against Napoli in the 2012 Supercoppa Italiana, scoring a goal as Juventus went on to win 4–2 after extra time. Due to his impressive performance against Napoli, Antonio Conte, who was Juventus's coach at the time, decided to start him in the opening league match of the 2012–13 season, against Parma, on 25 August: he made an immediate impact, by setting up Stephan Lichtsteiner's goal in a 2–0 home win. On 16 September, he scored his first goal with his new club in a 3–1 away league win over Genoa. Juventus went on to win the Serie A title that season. Asamoah was bought outright by Juventus in June 2013, signing a four-year deal with the club.

On 9 March 2014, Asamoah scored a notable goal in a 1–0 home victory over Fiorentina, as Juventus went on to defend the Serie A title and the Supercoppa Italiana that season.

During the 2014–15 season, Asamoah suffered a severe knee injury in the 10th league match of the season, on 1 November 2014, against Empoli, ruling him out for most of the season. He was only first able to return to the team and resume training towards the end of the season, as Juventus won the Serie A title; he was therefore not able to appear in Juventus's Coppa Italia victory over Lazio in the final. He returned to the pitch on 23 May 2015, in a 3–1 home win over Napoli.

On 23 July 2016, Asamoah started for Juventus as captain on pitch in the opening game of 2016 International Champions Cup Australian version, as the club were drawn 1–1 with Melbourne Victory (Melbourne Victory won 4–3 on penalties), at Melbourne's Melbourne Cricket Ground. On 25 September 2016, it was confirmed that Asamoah would be sidelined for six weeks after limping off the pitch a day before away to Palermo with a sprained right knee; tests at the J-Medical centre revealed he suffered the complete tear of the medial meniscus ligament.

In January 2018, it was reported that Asamoah chose not to renew his contract with Juventus, which was set to expire in June later that year. He made his 150th appearance for Juventus in a 0–0 away draw against S.P.A.L. in Serie A, on 17 March.

=== Inter Milan ===
In July 2018, Lega Serie A's registration confirmed that Asamoah had agreed to become an Inter player in May 2018; the signing was confirmed officially on 2 July. He made his Inter debut on 19 August, in a 1–0 away defeat to Sassuolo, the first match of the 2018–19 Serie A season.

=== Cagliari ===
On 3 February 2021, Asamoah signed a contract with Cagliari until 30 June 2021. He made his debut in Sardinia on 28 February 2021, in the 2–0 victory in home against Crotone. He became the most-capped African player in the Italian Serie A history, after making his 271st appearance in that match, surpassing his fellow Ghanaian compatriot Sulley Muntari who he was tied on 270 matches before the game.

On 5 October 2022, free agent Asamoah officially announced his retirement from professional football.

== International career ==
On the international level, Asamoah was given his debut for the Ghana national team, Black Stars, in 2009, under French manager Claude Le Roy. He represented Ghana in the 2008 and 2010 editions of the Africa Cup of Nations, winning a bronze and a silver medal in the respective tournaments, and later also appeared in the 2012 and 2013 editions. He also played for Ghana at the FIFA World Cup in 2010 and 2014, helping them reach the quarter-finals of the former tournament.

On 5 October 2022, Kwadwo announced his retirement from professional football.

== Style of play ==
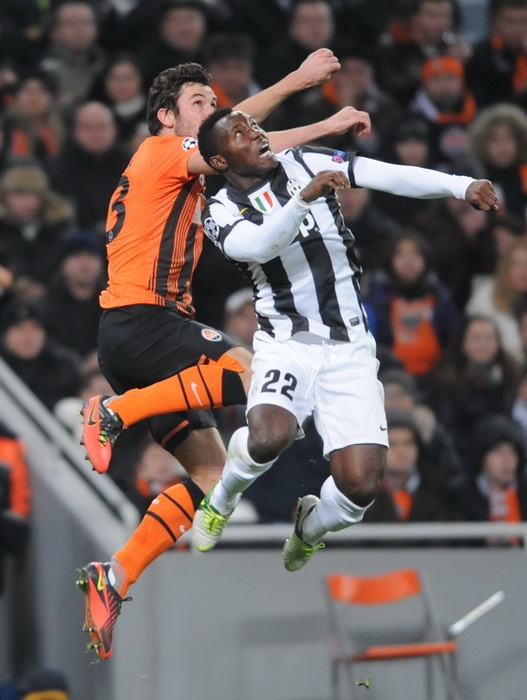
Asamoah (no. 22) versus a Shakhtar Donetsk player in the 2012–13 UEFA Champions League group stage

A dynamic, hardworking, energetic, versatile and tactically intelligent player, Asamoah was primarily known for his pace, strength, stamina, and his outstanding technical characteristics, as well as his ability to read the game; although he primarily served as a ball-winner, these attributes allowed him to be effective both offensively and defensively, and enabled him to play in several positions along the pitch in defence or midfield. A predominantly left-footed player, with Juventus, Asamoah was usually deployed as a full back, wing-back, or wide-midfielder on the left flank, although he had previously also been used in the centre as a defensive, central, box-to-box, or offensive midfielder prior to joining the club, and even in the "mezzala" role. In addition to his physical and athletic attributes, he was a very agile footballer, with good vision and an ability to make attacking runs and get into good offensive positions from which he could create chances for teammates with throughballs or deliveries into the area from the wing; he was also a neat passer, a powerful striker of the ball from distance, and a skilful dribbler. Despite his ability, Asamoah was often sidelined through injury.

== Personal life ==
Asamoah is married to Abena, who holds an Executive MBA from the University of Ghana. They have a son named Jason and a daughter named Jada. In 2020, he presented a cheque for $20,000 to the Komfo Anokye Teaching Hospital in Kumasi to support the fight against COVID-19.

== Career statistics ==
=== Club ===
Appearances and goals by club, season and competition
Club	Season	League			Coppa Italia		Europe		Other		Total	
Club	Season	Division	Apps	Goals	Apps	Goals	Apps	Goals	Apps	Goals	Apps	Goals
Udinese	2008–09	Serie A	20	2	2	0	6 (Note: Appearances in UEFA Cup)	0	—		28	2
Udinese	2009–10	Serie A	25	1	2	0	—		—		27	1
Udinese	2010–11	Serie A	38	2	1	0	—		—		39	2
Udinese	2011–12	Serie A	31	3	0	0	9 (Note: Two appearances in UEFA Champions League, seven appearances in UEFA Europa League)	0	—		40	3
Udinese	Total		114	8	5	0	15	0	—		134	8
Juventus	2012–13	Serie A	27	2	1	0	7 (Note: Appearances in UEFA Champions League)	0	1 (Note: Appearance in Supercoppa Italiana)	1	36	3
Juventus	2013–14	Serie A	34	2	1	0	11 (Note: Five appearances in UEFA Champions League, six appearances in UEFA Europa League)	0	1	0	47	2
Juventus	2014–15	Serie A	7	0	0	0	3	0	0	0	10	0
Juventus	2015–16	Serie A	11	0	2	0	0	0	0	0	13	0
Juventus	2016–17	Serie A	18	0	3	0	3	0	0	0	24	0
Juventus	2017–18	Serie A	19	0	4	0	3	0	0	0	26	0
Juventus	Total		116	4	11	0	27	0	2	1	156	5
Inter Milan	2018–19	Serie A	32	0	1	0	9 (Note: Six appearances in UEFA Champions League, three appearances in UEFA Europa League)	0	—		42	0
Inter Milan	2019–20	Serie A	8	0	0	0	3	0	—		11	0
Inter Milan	Total		40	0	1	0	12	0	—		53	0
Cagliari	2020–21	Serie A	9	0	—		—		—		9	0
Career total			279	12	17	0	54	0	2	1	352	13

=== International ===
Appearances and goals by national team and year
National team	Year	Apps	Goals
Ghana	2009	6	1
Ghana	2010	18	0
Ghana	2011	10	0
Ghana	2012	11	0
Ghana	2013	14	3
Ghana	2014	10	0
Ghana	2018	1	0
Ghana	2019	4	0
Total		74	4

Scores and results list Ghana's goal tally first.

List of international goals scored by Kwadwo Asamoah
No.	Date	Venue	Opponent	Score	Result	Competition
1.	7 June 2009	Stade du 26 Mars, Bamako, Mali	Mali	1–0	2–0	2010 FIFA World Cup qualification
2.	20 January 2013	Nelson Mandela Bay Stadium, Port Elizabeth, South Africa	DR Congo	2–0	2–2	2013 Africa Cup of Nations
3.	9 February 2013	Nelson Mandela Bay Stadium, Port Elizabeth, South Africa	Mali	1–2	1–3	2013 Africa Cup of Nations
4.	6 September 2013	Baba Yara Stadium, Kumasi, Ghana	Zambia	2–0	2–1	2014 FIFA World Cup qualification

== Honours ==
Juventus

- Serie A: 2012–13, 2013–14, 2014–15, 2015–16, 2016–17, 2017–18
- Coppa Italia: 2014–15, 2015–16, 2016–17, 2017–18
- Supercoppa Italiana: 2012, 2013, 2015
- UEFA Champions League runner-up: 2014–15, 2016–17

Inter Milan

- UEFA Europa League runner-up: 2019–20

Ghana

- Africa Cup of Nations runner-up: 2010; third place: 2008

Individual

- CAF Most Promising African Player: 2010
- SWAG Sports Personality of the Year: 2012
- Ghana Player of the Year: 2012
- CAF Team of the Year: 2014
- Serie A Team of the Year: 2013–14
- Africa Cup of Nations Team of the Tournament: 2010, 2012
