= Theodosius Okan Sowa =

Ghanaian diplomat (1918–2003)

Ghana Ambassador to Mali
- In office 1977–1983
- President: Ignatius Kutu Acheampong
- Preceded by: Kwame Addae
- Succeeded by: Kwadwo Afoakwa Sarpong

Personal details
- Born: Theodosius Okan Sowa; 1918 Gold Coast
- Died: 2003 (aged 84–85)
- Education: Accra Academy
- Alma mater: Oxford University
- Occupation: Diplomat

Theodosius Okan Sowa (1918–2003) was a Ghanaian diplomat. He was Ghana's first Consul-General to the United Nations and Ghana's ambassador to Mali from 1977 to 1983.

== Early life and education ==
Sowa was born in 1918 in the Gold Coast. He had his early education at the Salem School in Teshie and continued at the Accra Academy from 1936 to 1941. He later entered Oxford University in 1950 on scholarship where he studied Local Government Administration.

== Career ==
After his studies in the United Kingdom, Sowah returned to the Gold Coast. Upon his return, he was tasked with the opening of several Local Government offices in the colony. He later joined the Ghanaian Foreign Service as a career diplomat. In 1959, he worked as the 1st Secretary to Ghana's ambassador to the United States of America, William Marmon Quao Halm. On 8 July 1963, he became Ghana's first Consul General to the United Nations. He later served as a Supervising Director of the Ministry of Foreign Affairs prior to his appointment as Ghana's ambassador to Mali. He replaced Kwame Addae who was then moved to Kampala to serve as Ghana's High Commissioner to Uganda. Sowa held this appointment until April 1983 when the embassy was closed for economic reasons.

== Personal life ==
Sowa married Mrs. Mercy Sowa in 1947. He died in 2003.

== See also ==
- Embassy of Ghana in Bamako
