= Tonyi Senayah =

- Education: Prempeh College, University of Ghana
- Occupation: Businessman

Tonyi Senayah is a Ghanaian businessman and the Chief Executive Officer of Horseman Shoes. Senayah began studying shoe making in 2009 under a local shoe maker at Lapaz. The brand has been featured in local and international media, notably CNN and DW networks.

== Early life and education ==
Senayah went to Prempeh college in Kumasi and is a sociology graduate of the University of Ghana, Legon where he was also a student leader.

In 2010, he opened Horseman Shoes, a Ghanaian-based footwear manufacturing company that produces men’s dress shoes, unisex sandals and slippers, school sandals, and safety boots.

In 2015, Senayah ranked 9th as the Most Influential Young Ghanaian out of a list of 50 personalities and 16th in 2016.
