= Martin Osei Nyarko =

Ghanaian footballer

Apio
Personal information
- Full name: Martin Osei Nyarko
- Date of birth: March 13, 1985 (age 41)
- Place of birth: Amanfoo, Ghana

Team information
- Current team: King Faisal Babes
- Number: 19

Youth career
- 2005–2006: Prempeh College

Senior career*
| Years | Team | Apps | (Gls) |
| 2006–2007 | Bofoakwa Tano | | |
| 2007–2008 | Kaaseman F.C. | | |
| 2008–present | King Faisal Babes | | |
- * Club domestic league appearances and goals ‡ National team caps and goals as of 07 August 2008

Martin Osei Nyarko (born March 13, 1985, in Amanfoo) is a Ghanaian footballer who played as a striker for King Faisal Babes.

== Career ==
Nyarko began his career at Prempeh College (Class of '2005, Aggrey House) where he was named team captain. He won the Ashanti Regional Milo Championship and the National Milo Championship. In 2005, he was named as Sportsman of the Year On 21 February 2006 he joined Bofoakwa Tano, and had been considered by Berekum Arsenal and King Faisal Babes. Apio left after one year Bofoakwa Tano and signed with Kaaseman F.C. in Winter 2006/2007. On 11 June 2008 left Kaaseman F.C. and signed with Ghana Premier League club King Faisal Babes.

== Titles ==
- 2005: Ashanti Regional Milo Championship
- 2005: Sportsman of the Year
- 2005: National Milo Championship
