= Joakim Lartey =

American drummer (born 1953)

Joakim Lartey is a percussionist, born October 27, 1953, in Ghana. He has played with Singer Natalie Merchant, John Hall, and renowned jazz drummer Jack DeJohnette.

Joakim studied at Prempeh College in Kumasi, Ghana and then at Vassar College, Poughkeepsie, New York, as well as The Creative Music Studio, Woodstock, New York.

He also attended Hoquiam High School in Hoquiam, Washington, as an exchange student during the 1971-1972 school year.
