= Francis Amanfoh =

Ghanaian military officer and diplomat

Gen. Francis Adu-Amanfoh is a Ghanaian army personnel and diplomat. He has the rank of major general in the Ghana Army. He was appointed by John Agyekum Kufour as Ghana's ambassador to Liberia from February 2006 until March 2009.

== Education and working life ==
Francis Adu-Amanfoh had his secondary school education at Prempeh College where he obtained his GCE Advanced level certificate. In May 2005 he was appointed Head of Defence Intelligence in the Ghana Armed Forces. and was posted as Ambassador to Liberia on 27 January 2006. In 2008 he sued the Ghana Palaver, seeking two billion cedis for defamation after the paper had printed four stories which attempted to create the impression that he was a liar. His term of office as Ambassador to Liberia ended in March 2009.

== Ambassadorial appointment ==
In July 2017, President Nana Akufo-Addo named Francis Amanfoh as Ghana's ambassador to Mali. He was among twenty two other distinguished Ghanaians who were named to head various diplomatic Ghanaian mission in the world.

== See also ==
- Embassy of Ghana in Bamako
