= George Abu Wemah =

Ghana Ambassador to Mali
- In office 1969–1974
- President: Edward Akufo-Addo
- Preceded by: K. Sam-Ghartey
- Succeeded by: Kwame Addae

Ghana ambassador to United Arab Republic (UAR)
- In office 1966–1969
- President: Joseph Arthur Ankrah
- Preceded by: Jonathan Lawrence Appah-Sampong
- Succeeded by: Richard Abusua-Yedom Quarshie

Ghana Ambassador to Bulgaria
- In office 1964–1966
- President: Dr. Kwame Nkrumah
- Preceded by: Jonathan Lawrence Appah-Sampong

Ghana Ambassador to Upper Volta
- In office 1961–1964
- President: Dr. Kwame Nkrumah
- Preceded by: New
- Succeeded by: Mallam Bukari

Personal details
- Born: George Abu Wemah; 21 May 1917 Tamale, Gold Coast
- Education: Achimota College
- Occupation: Diplomat

George Abu Wemah (born 21 May 1917) was a Ghanaian diplomat. He served as Ghana's ambassador to Upper Volta (Burkina Faso) from 1961 to 1964, Ghana's ambassador to Bulgaria from 1964 to 1966, Ghana's high Commissioner to the United Arab Republic (UAR) from 1966 to 1969, and Ghana's ambassador to Mali from 1969 to 1974.

== Early life and education ==
Wemah was born on 21 May 1917 at Tamale in the Northern Region. He had his early education at Tamale Government Boarding School from 1927 to 1934 and continued at Achimota College from 1934 to 1940 where he received his Teachers' Certificate "A". While at Achimota College, he was the Games prefect. He won full colours in football, cricket and hockey in his first and second years.

== Career and ambassadorial appointments ==
In January 1941 Wemah entered the Gold Coast Civil Service and served in that capacity for about three (3) years. He later taught at the Tamale Government Teacher Training College as a pioneer staff from 1944 to 1953. From 1953 to 1957, he was an Assistant Education Officer. In 1957, he worked at the Local Government Administration of the Tamale Urban Council. A year later, he returned to the Ghana Civil Service (then Gold Coast Civil Service) working as an Administrative Officer of Regional Organisation in Tamale until 1960. He was first stationed at Bole District, West Gonja in December 1958 and later posted to the Regional Office in Tamale in September 1959.

In 1961 Wemah was appointed Ghana's ambassador to Upper Volta (Burkina Faso), he served in this capacity until 1964 when he was appointed Ghana's ambassador to Bulgaria. In July 1966, he was appointed Ghana's ambassador to the United Arab Republic (UAR) and served in that capacity until 1969. In April 1967 as an ambassador he was the leader of the Ghana delegation to the conference of Ministers of Social Welfare held in Cairo. In 1969 he was appointed Commissioner for Secretariats and Special Departments and State Protocol. Later that year, he was made Ghana Ambassador to Mali. His tenure as Ghana's ambassador to Mali ended in 1974.

== Personal life ==
Wemah was chairman of the Tamale branch of the Red Cross from 1957 to 1958. He had two wives and eight children. His hobbies included recreations, cycling, gardening and photography.

== See also ==
- Embassy of Ghana in Bamako
