= Julius Ansah =

Ghanaian judge (1950–2024)

Justice of the Supreme Court Ghana Julius Ansah

October 2004 – 2020
- Appointed by: John Kuffour

Personal details
- Born: 1950
- Died: September 2024 (aged 74)
- Education: Ofori Panin Senior High School, Prempeh College

Julius Ansah (1950 – September 2024) was a Ghanaian judge who served as a Justice of the Supreme Court of Ghana from 2004 to 2020.

Ansah was nominated to the Supreme Court of Ghana by John Kufuor, who was then the President of Ghana. He was sworn in by John Kufuor in October 2004 along with two other new Supreme Court judges, Felix Michael Lartey and Richard Twum Aninakwah. As the most senior judge at the time, he acted as the Chief Justice of Ghana between 20 December 2019 and 7 January 2020 following the retirement of Sophia Akuffo as the Chief Justice. Kwasi Anin-Yeboah succeeded Akuffo as the next Chief Justice. During 2018 when he also served as the acting Chief Justice, he wrote a letter of apology to nine judges whose homes were to be affected by the National Cathedral Project envisaged by the Government of Ghana. Two of the affected judges, Mariama Owusu and Avril Lovelace-Johnson later joined him in the Supreme Court in December 2019.

Ansah died in September 2024, at the age of 74.

== See also ==
- List of judges of the Supreme Court of Ghana
- Supreme Court of Ghana
