= Salifu Yakubu =

Ghanaian politician

Ghana Ambassador to Mali
- In office 1961–1968
- Nominated by: Dr Kwame Nkrumah
- Preceded by: New
- Succeeded by: K. Sam-Ghartey

Member of the Ghana Parliament for Savelugu
- In office 1956 – February 1966
- Preceded by: Bukhari Sumani
- Succeeded by: Abdulai Yakubu

Personal details
- Born: 15 November 1919 Accra, Gold Coast
- Party: Northern People's Party; Convention People's Party
- Education: Achimota College

Salifu Yakubu was a Ghanaian politician and diplomat. He was the member of parliament for the Savelugu constituency from 1956 to 1966. While in parliament, he doubled as Ghana's ambassador to Mali from 1961 until 1968.

== Early life and career ==
Yakubu had his early education at Tamale Government School from 1929 to 1938. He continued at Achimota College where he pursued a course in Arts and Crafts, graduating in 1940.

== Career ==
Yakubu joined the teaching staff of Tamale Middle School in 1940 and taught there for a year before joining the Police Force of the Gold Coast. He served as a police officer rising to the rank of a sergeant until his retirement on 12 July 1956.

== Politics and ambassadorial appointment ==
Following his retirement from the Police Force, Yakubu ventured politics. He stood for the Savelugu parliamentary seat on the ticket of the Northern People's Party and won in 1956. He remained a member of the Northern People's Party until 1958 when he crossed carpets in parliament to join the Convention People's Party.

In 1961, Yakubu was appointed Ghana's ambassador to Mali. He served in that capacity until his wrongful imprisonment on 30 December 1968 on two counts of embezzlement. While serving as Ghana's ambassador, Yakubu remained a member of parliament for Savelugu until February 1966 when the Nkrumah government was overthrown.

He died at the Tamale Teaching Hospital due to an illness.

== See also ==
- Embassy of Ghana in Bamako
- List of MLAs elected in the 1956 Gold Coast legislative election
- List of MPs elected in the 1965 Ghanaian parliamentary election
