= Kwadwo Afoakwa Sarpong =

Ghanaian diplomat

Ghana Ambassador to South Korea
- In office 2006–2008
- President: John Kufour
- Preceded by: Edward Obeng Kufuor
- Succeeded by: Elizabeth Nicol

Ghana Ambassador to Mali
- In office 2002–2006
- President: John Kufour
- Preceded by: Theodosius Okan Sowa
- Succeeded by: Clayton Naa Boanubah Yaache

Personal details
- Born: Kwadwo Afoakwa Sarpong; 1943 Gold Coast
- Died: January 9, 2008 (aged 64–65) Seoul, South Korea
- Education: Prempeh College
- Occupation: Diplomat

Kwadwo Afoakwa Sarpong was a Ghanaian diplomat. He served as Ghana's ambassador to Mali from 2002 to 2006, and Ghana's ambassador to South Korea from 2006 until his death in 2008.

== Early life and education ==
Sarpong hailed from Essieniepong, a farming community near Ejisu in the Ashanti Region of Ghana. He was born in the Gold Coast in 1943. He had his secondary education at Prempeh College, and studied marketing at the Modern Training in Management and Salesmanship Ltd. at Surpass House, Harrison Street London from 1969 to 1970.

== Career ==
Sarpong began as a teacher at St. Joseph Middle School in 1962. He later worked as a banker with the Kumasi and Konongo branches of Barclays Bank until 1969. After his studies abroad, he returned to Ghana in 1971 to establish his own private import and export company. He also served as an executive of Bontum Investment Ltd. in Kumasi, a private company that deals with general merchandise and industrial elements from 1971 until his ambassadorial appointment in 2002.

On 19 October 2002, he was appointed Ghana's ambassador to Mali. He became Ghana's first ambassador to Mali following the re-opening of the diplomatic mission in 2002. The mission had been closed since April 1983. He presented his credentials on 25 October 2002 and served in this capacity until 29 January 2006. After his service in Bamako, he was appointed Ghana's ambassador to South Korea in that same year. He held this appointment until his death in 2008.

== Personal life and death ==
Sarpong died in Seoul in the early hours of Wednesday 9 January 2008 after falling into a coma for about two months. He was survived by his wife, Constance Sarpong, and five children.

== See also ==
- Embassy of Ghana in Bamako
