= Embassy of Ghana, Bamako =

Coordinates: 12.632381°N 8.027106°W

- Location: Bamako
- Ambassador: Francis Amanfoh
- Website: https://www.embassypages.com/missions/embassy23672/

The Embassy of Ghana in Bamako is the diplomatic mission of the Republic of Ghana to Mali. It also serves as the official residence of the Ghana ambassador to Mali.

Ghana's diplomatic relations with Mali could be traced from the Ghana-Guinea-Mali Union. The union disbanded in May 1963 however Ghana and Mali continued to appoint ambassadors to represent their countries in the capital of their former ally. They were called; Resident Minister. The Embassy previously operated intermittently and was closed in April 1983 for economic reasons. The last opening was in October 2002.

Ghana's current ambassador to Mali is Francis Amanfoh.

== List of Ambassadors ==
Term of office	Ambassador	President of Ghana	President of Mali
1961 to 1966	Salifu Yakubu	Kwame Nkrumah	Modibo Keïta
1967 to 1969	K. Sam-Ghartey	Joseph Arthur Ankrah	Modibo Keïta
1969 to 1974	George Abu Wemah	Edward Akufo-Addo	Moussa Traoré
August 27, 1975 to 1977	Kwame Addae	Ignatius Kutu Acheampong	Moussa Traoré
1977 to 1983	Theodosius Okan Sowa	Ignatius Kutu Acheampong	Moussa Traoré
October 19, 2002 to January 29, 2006	Kwadwo Afoakwa Sarpong	John Agyekum Kufuor	Ahmed Mohamed Ag Hamani
February 17, 2006	Clayton Naa Boanubah Yaache	John Agyekum Kufuor	Ousmane Issoufi Maïga
May 23, 2015	Mahmoud Khalid	John Dramani Mahama	Ibrahim Boubacar Keïta
July 10, 2017	Francis Amanfoh	Nana Akuffo Addo	Ibrahim Boubacar Keïta
