= Bibini River =

River in Ashanti Region, Ghana

Location
- Country: Ghana

Bibini River is a river within KNUST located in Kumasi in the Ashanti Region of Ghana. It is a tributary of Wiwi/Wewe River. It serves as a source of irrigation for vegetables such as lettuce.
