= Kofi Boahene =

Ghanaian-born American plastic surgeon

Kofi Owusu Boahene
- Born: Ghana
- Scientific career
- Fields: Ethnic skin and cosmetic surgery
- Workplaces: Johns Hopkins Hospital
- Website: drboahene.com

Kofi Owusu Boahene is a Ghanaian-born American physician, writer, researcher, and academic.

He is a professor of facial plastic and reconstructive surgery at the Johns Hopkins University School of Medicine and a facial plastic surgeon in Otolaryngology–Head and Neck Surgery at the Johns Hopkins Hospital in Baltimore, Maryland. As a facial plastic surgeon, Boahene specializes solely in plastic surgery of the face, head and neck.

== Early years ==
Boahene, who is the firstborn of eight children grew up on Binton Street, a less-affluent neighborhood in North Kaneshie, Accra. His parents, Pastor and Mrs. James Owusu, operated a pharmacy store before becoming full-time missionaries in the early 1980s. He attended primary school at Bubuashie, Datus Preparatory School and his secondary school education at Prempeh College in Kumasi.

== Education ==
In 1991, after his A-Level exams and National Service with the Ghana Meteorological Agency, he traveled to Russia to pursue training in veterinary medicine. He became fluent in the Russian language at a time where the former Soviet Union was opening its doors to the outside world. Due to political reasons in the Soviet Union, and other factors, Boahene moved to the United States.

Boahene received his medical degree in 1999 from Meharry Medical College in Nashville, Tennessee, graduating with the highest honors in his class. He completed his residency in Otolaryngology–Head and Neck Surgery in 2004 at the Mayo Clinic in Rochester, Minnesota.

Boahene completed specialized fellowship training in facial plastic and reconstructive surgery at the University of Minnesota Hospital & Clinics in 2005, under the mentorship of facial plastic surgeon Dr. Peter Hilger. His training included cosmetic surgery of the face, use on minimally invasive techniques for facial rejuvenation, microvascular surgery, craniofacial surgery, and skull-base surgery in both children and adults. Because of his particular interest in craniofacial surgery, Boahene spent some time in the Australia Craniofacial Center, in Adelaide, directed by Professor David.

== Career ==
Boahene is an assistant professor of facial plastic and reconstructive surgery at the Johns Hopkins University School of Medicine, Department of Otolaryngology, Head, and Neck Surgery in Baltimore, Maryland. He trains both surgical residents and Fellows the art and craft of facial plastic and reconstructive surgery. He is an oral board examiner for the American Board of Facial Plastic Surgery that certifies surgeons who specialize in facial plastic surgery. He also writes questions for the American Board of Otolaryngology Head and Neck Surgery.

For his expertise, Boahene has been an invited speaker at both national and international conferences in Panama, Peru, Germany, Ghana, United States, Canada and the Caribbean Islands.

He has authored in several peer-reviewed journals, major text books in facial plastic surgery and is a regular reviewer for the archives of facial plastic surgery journal. He is an expert in rhinoplasty, and has particular interest in cosmetic and reconstructive nose surgery in various ethnic groups.

=== Honors and achievements ===
In 1993, he received the Alpha Omega Alpha Medical Honors Award. In 1998 and 1999, he was selected as an ethnic scholar in cancer research by the American Academy of Cancer Researchers (AACR). At Mayo, he received a Best Teacher Recognition Award and the Distinguished Mayo Brothers Fellowship Award. The Distinguished Mayo Brother's Fellowship Award is an award given to only two surgeons in any given year throughout the Mayo Foundation. Recently, Boahene was awarded the Jack R. Anderson Prize for Scholastic Excellence for attaining the highest score in the nation on written and oral examinations administered by the American Board of Facial Plastic and Reconstructive Surgery (ABFPRS).

=== Advances in the field ===
Boahene is actively involved in tissue-engineering research that is exploring ways to improve wound healing, enhance injectable tissue fillers, and generate new cartilage or bone for facial reconstruction.

In 2003, he received an international medicine travel grant and was able to participate in his first medical mission to Mexico. Since then, Boahene has been on several medical mission trips to Peru and his native country, Ghana.
