= K. Sam-Ghartey =

Ghana's ambassador to Mali from 1967 to 1969

K. Ghartey-Sam

Ghana Ambassador to Mali
- In office 1967–1969
- President: Joseph Arthur Ankrah
- Preceded by: Salifu Yakubu
- Succeeded by: George Abu Wemah

Personal details
- Born: K. Sam-Ghartey
- Occupation: Diplomat

K. Sam-Ghartey was a Ghanaian diplomat. He served as Ghana's ambassador to Mali from 1967 to 1969. Due to dr. Kwame Nkrumah's relationship with the then president of Mali, Modibo Keïta, Ghana's relationship with Mali waned following the overthrow of Kwame Nkrumah. Ghana's representative in Mali, Ghartey-Sam consequently served as head of Chancery.

== See also ==
- Embassy of Ghana in Bamako
