= Kwame Addae =

Ghanaian diplomat

Ghana Ambassador to Mali
- In office 1974–1977
- President: Ignatius Kutu Acheampong
- Preceded by: George Abu Wemah
- Succeeded by: Theodosius Okan Sowa

Ghana High Commissioner to Pakistan
- In office 1966–1968
- President: Joseph Arthur Ankrah
- Preceded by: A. B. B. Kofi
- Succeeded by: G. C. N. Cudjoe

Personal details
- Born: Kwame Addae Gold Coast
- Occupation: Diplomat

Kwame Addae was a Ghanaian diplomat. He served as Ghana's High Commissioner to Pakistan from 1966 to 1968 and Ghana's Ambassador to Mali from 1974 to 1977. Prior to representing Ghana in Pakistan, he was the head of chancery for the Ghana High Commission to the United Kingdom.

== See also ==
- Embassy of Ghana in Bamako
