= Sam Adjei =

Ghanaian public health figure (1948–2016)

- Born: 16 June 1948; Accra, Gold Coast
- Died: 7 February 2016 (aged 67); Korle Bu Teaching Hospital, Accra, Ghana
- Known for: The development of Ghanaian public health

Sam Adjei (16 June 1948 – 7 February 2016) was a leading public health figure in Ghana.

== Biography ==
Adjei was born in Accra, which was then part of what was called the Gold Coast Colony. As a child Adjei suffered from polio, which caused him to walk with a limp. He received his early schooling from Prempeh College in Kumasi. He received his degree in medicine from the University of Ghana in 1976. In 1979 he became one of the ten district health officials of Ghana. He later went to the United Kingdom to study for an MSc degree in epidemiology and disease control at the London School of Hygiene and Tropical Medicine.

In 1983 Adjei was given the new government position of Senior Medical Officer for Public Health. In this position, he developed programmes to combat sexually transmitted diseases as well as leprosy, schistosomiasis, and malaria. In 1990 he undertook to create a system for health research in Ghana. In 2000, he was made Deputy Director General of the Ghana Health Service. After retiring from the government in 2007, he founded the Centre for Health and Social Services.

Adjei died at Korle Bu Teaching Hospital from cancer in 2016, aged 67.
