= Yussif Chibsah =

Ghanaian footballer

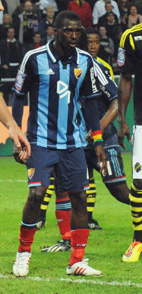
- Chibsah playing for Djurgårdens IF in 2013

Personal information
- Full name: Yussif Alhassan Chibsah
- Date of birth: 30 December 1983 (age 42)
- Place of birth: Accra, Ghana
- Height: 1.75 m (5 ft 9 in)
- Position: Midfielder

Youth career
- 1996–1999: Prempeh College

Senior career*
Years	Team	Apps	(Gls)
1999–2003	King Faisal Babes	45	(32)
2003–2006	Asante Kotoko	37	(21)
2006	IFK Mariehamn	10	(3)
2008–2011	Gefle IF	104	(5)
2012–2014	Djurgårdens IF	57	(1)
2014–2015	Alanyaspor	1	(0)
2015	GAIS	14	(1)
2016	Ljungskile SK	24	(0)

International career^{‡}
2004–	Ghana	13	(1)
- * Club domestic league appearances and goals as of 9 January 2017 ‡ National team caps and goals as of 27 November 2004

Yussif Chibsah (born 30 December 1983) is a Ghanaian former football midfielder, who last played for Ljungskile SK in Sweden.

== Early life ==
Born in Accra, Chibsah was a member of the Prempeh College (Class of '96 Gberg House) and is considered a highly educated footballer, majoring in Accounting but he also studied management and economics.

== Career ==
Chibsah started his career at Kumasi based King Faisal in his home country, and in 2003 moved to Asante Kotoko where all his years had a key midfielder role. With Kotoko met up with great moments as he played at the first CAF Confederation Cup in 2004 winning the silver medal as the runners up to Hearts of Oak and also in the CAF Champions League in 2006.

After the 2006 World Cup, he was invited by French Ligue 1 club Rennes for a trial but could not meet the deadline for the summer registration. He had trials also with Hamburger SV and Djurgårdens IF in January 2006 following preseason in South Africa. In his first attempt to move outside Ghana he signed a pre-contract with Finnish IFK Mariehamn, but with Kotoko asking for more money was never eligible to play for them. In the 2006/07 season he played for Asanta Kotoko FC in Ghana and later on came close to sign for Danish side Randers FC but eventually signed in October 2007 a two-year contract with Swedish Allsvenskan club Gefle IF under manager Per Olsson. When his contract ended and despite interest from 2nd division Bundesliga club he renew for 2 more year with Gefle IF. Prior to the 2012 season he returned to Djurgårdens IF and signed a contract with the club. On 21 January 2014 it was announced that Chibsah switch shirtnumber from 4 to 17.

== International ==
He was captain of the Ghana olympic team, who exited in the first round of the 2004 Summer Olympics in Athens, having finished in third place in Group B and was also the captain of the Ghana Meteors in the 2003 All Africa Games in Abuja that won the bronze medal. His international efforts was recognized as he was a member of the Ghanaian standby players in 2006 World Cup in Germany after playing most of the matches of the qualifying round. Chibsah has over 50 caps with all levels of International Ghana football from U-17 to senior team.

== Personal ==
Chibsah's younger brother Abdul Faisal Alhassan-Chibsah played soccer at Carson Newman College in Tennessee, his first year and transferred to university of Delaware to complete his sophomore, junior, and senior year. He is now taking his coaching courses in USA.
