= Sly Tetteh =

Ghanaian footballer

Personal information
- Full name: Alhaji Ibrahim Sly Tetteh
- Place of birth: Accra, Ghana
- Date of death: 3 September 2011
- Place of death: Cape Coast, Ghana

Senior career*
Years	Team	Apps	(Gls)
1980–1992	Sekondi Hasaacas		
1992–1995	Liberty University		

Managerial career
- 1995–2011: Liberty Professionals F.C. (Chairman & Technical Director)
- 2005–2011: Liberty Soccer Academy Togo (Technical Director)
- * Club domestic league appearances and goals

Alhaji Ibrahim Sly Tetteh (died 3 September 2011) was a Ghanaian football player and administrator who was the President of Liberty Professionals.

== Playing career ==
Tetteh won the West African Club Championship with Sekondi Hasaacas in 1982.

== Coaching career ==
He also ran academies in Ghana, Togo and Kenya and has been credited with discovering the talents of Michael Essien, Sulley Muntari, Asamoah Gyan, Derek Boateng, Kwadwo Asamoah, and John Paintsil.

== Personal life ==
Tetteh was born in Accra and grew up in Sekondi. He attended the Liberty University of Lynchburg, Virginia in the United States from 1992 to 1995.
