= Samuel Yaw Adusei =

Ghanaian politician

Hon. Samuel Yaw Adusei
- President: John Dramani Mahama

Personal details
- Born: Ghana
- Party: NDC
- Education: Prempeh College, Kwame Nkrumah University of Science and Technology, University of London and BPP University (UK)
- Occupation: Entrepreneur and Politician

Samuel Yaw Adusei is a Ghanaian politician and Entrepreneur. He is a member of the National Democratic Congress (NDC) party. He is the former Deputy Ashanti Regional Minister of Ghana. and former Deputy Minister of Works, Housing and Water Resources of Ghana.
