= Ezekiel Tetteh =

Ghanaian footballer (born 1992)

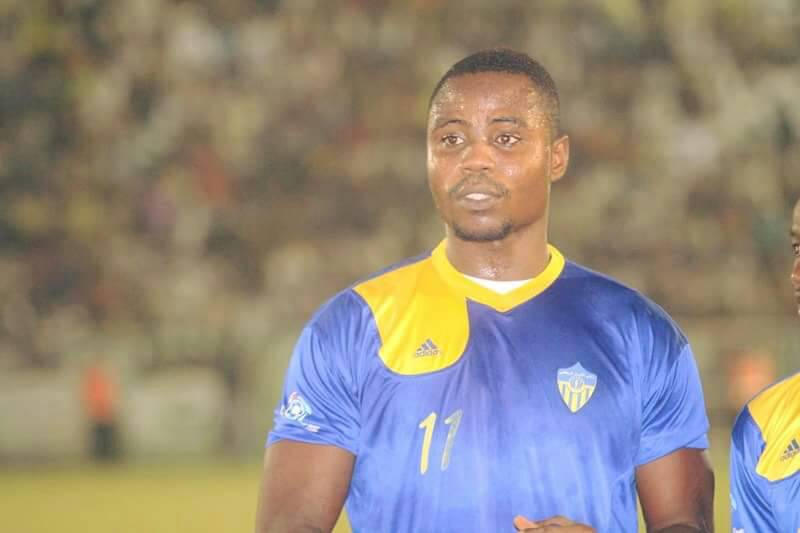

Personal information
- Date of birth: 30 April 1992 (age 34)
- Place of birth: Accra, Ghana
- Height: 1.88 m (6 ft 2 in)
- Position: Forward

Team information
- Current team: Al falah sc

Youth career
- 2008: WAECO Academy
- 2010: Heart of Lions

Senior career*
Years	Team	Apps	(Gls)
2013–2014	Okwawu United	13	(7)
2014–2015	Hearts of Oak	3	(0)
2015–2016	Kirkuk	13	(6)
2015–2016	Alamal Atbara	20	(16)
2016–2018	Al-Ahly Shendi	16	(5)
2018–2019	Dire Dawa		
2019–	Great Olympics		
- * Club domestic league appearances and goals as of 3 March 2019

Ezekiel Tetteh (born 30 April 1992) is a Ghanaian professional footballer who plays as a forward for Great Olympics.

== Career ==
=== Hearts of Oak ===
Ezekiel on 9 January 2014 signed his first professional contract for Ghanaian premier league outfit Accra Hearts of Oak. Tetteh scored six goals in seven Division One League matches and two in three Middle League matches for Okwahu United in the 2013 division one competition. Injury was the main cause for his short stint at the club making only three appearances for the Phobians.

=== Kerkuk FC ===
Ezekiel had a stint with Kirkuk SC in Iraq from (2014–2015).

=== Alamal SC Atbara ===
With just a short belt at Kerkuk FC, he then signed with Sudanese Premier League outfit Alamal SC Atbara in the 2015-2016 transfer windows.

=== Al Ahly Shendi ===
After a successful debut season with Alamal SC Atbara, Al Ahly Shendi quickly send in transfer request with strive competition from Al Khartoum FC. He finally landed a three-year contract with Shendi state club Al-Ahly Shendi in 2016 replacing Nigerian Kelechi Osunwa who banged in a record 38 goals the previous season and joined Al Merreikh.

Tetteh moved to Dire Dawa City S.C. August 2018.

== Honours ==
- Goal King Award, Ghana Division One League
