= Atonsu (Ashanti Region) =

Community in Ashanti Region, Ghana

- Location in Ghana
- Coordinates: 6°38′49″N 1°36′32″W
- Country: Ghana
- Region: Ashanti Region
- District: Asokwa Municipal District; Sekyere Central District

Atonsu is a suburb of Kumasi in the Asokwa Municipal District and Asokwa Constituency in the Ashanti Region of Ghana which have Hon. Patricia Appiagyei as its member of parliament. The landfill site is situated nearby to the suburb Agogo, as well as near Ahinsan.

Atonsu is also a community in the Sekyere Central District in the Ashanti Region of Ghana.

== Institutions ==
- Adansi Rural Bank Limited
- Atonsu Municipal Assembly Cluster of Schools
- Atonsu Municipal Assembly Primary and JHS
- Atonsu Health Centre
