= Kaase, Kumasi =

Kaase
- Suburb
- Location in Ghana
- Coordinates: 6°39′0″N 1°37′58″W
- Country: Ghana
- Region: Ashanti Region
- District: Kumasi Metropolitan District

Kaase is suburb of Kumasi. Kumasi is the regional capital of the Ashanti Region of Ghana. It is both a residential and industrial area in the Kumasi Metropolitan Assembly. It is about 10 kilometres westwards from centre of the regional capital.

== Notable place ==
There are several wood processing companies in the town. The Kumasi Abattoir is also located in the town. It also has breweries and bottling companies located there. It is therefore an important industrial region in Ghana.

== Sports ==
The town also has a local based association football team, Kaaseman FC. The team plays in the GAFCOA in Ghana.

Gihoc Football Club.

Young Chelsea Football Club.
