= Felix M. Lartey =

Ghanaian lawyer

Supreme Court Justice
- In office 2004–2005

Chief Justice of the Gambia
- In office 1999–2001

Personal details
- Born: Ghana

Felix Michael Lartey is a Ghanaian barrister who served as a Supreme Court Justice in Ghana in 2004 and 2005 and the Chief Justice of the Gambia from 1999 to 2001.

== See also ==
- List of judges of the Supreme Court of Ghana
- Supreme Court of Ghana
