= Urban stream =

Formerly natural waterway flowing through heavily populated area

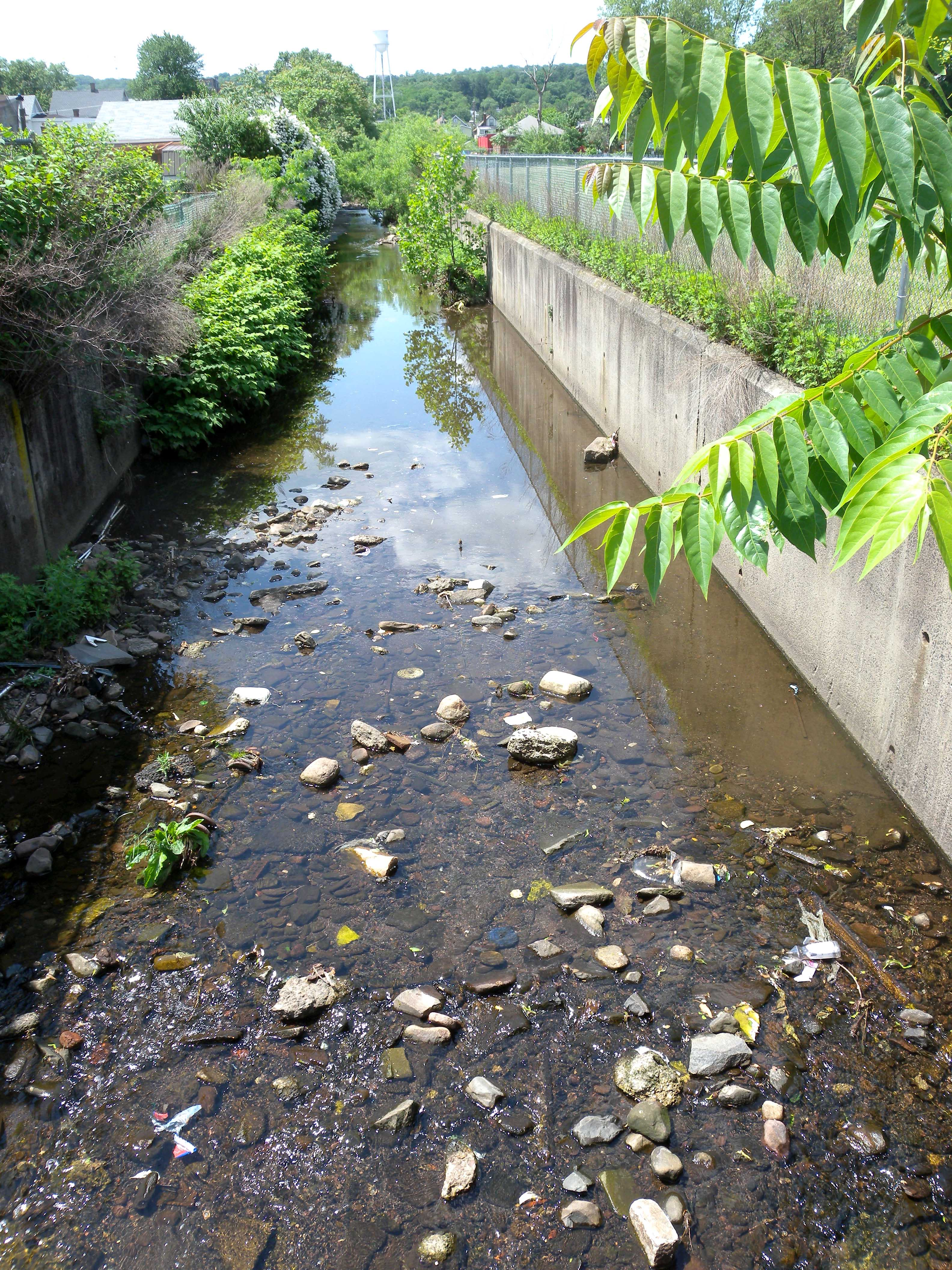
Second River, an urban stream in Orange, New Jersey

An urban stream is a waterway that flows through a densely populated, heavily developed urban area. Urbanized landscapes alter water flows into and within streams compared with pre-urbanized landscapes. Urban streams are often impaired in characteristic ways. The combination of impairments is referred to as "urban stream syndrome," and it includes pollution from urban stormwater runoff and combined sewer overflows. Urban streams tend to be "flashier" meaning they have more frequent and larger high flow and flooding events. These alterations to the stream typically lead to changes in the communities of organisms, favoring organisms with high tolerances of the degraded conditions.

== Catchment urbanization ==
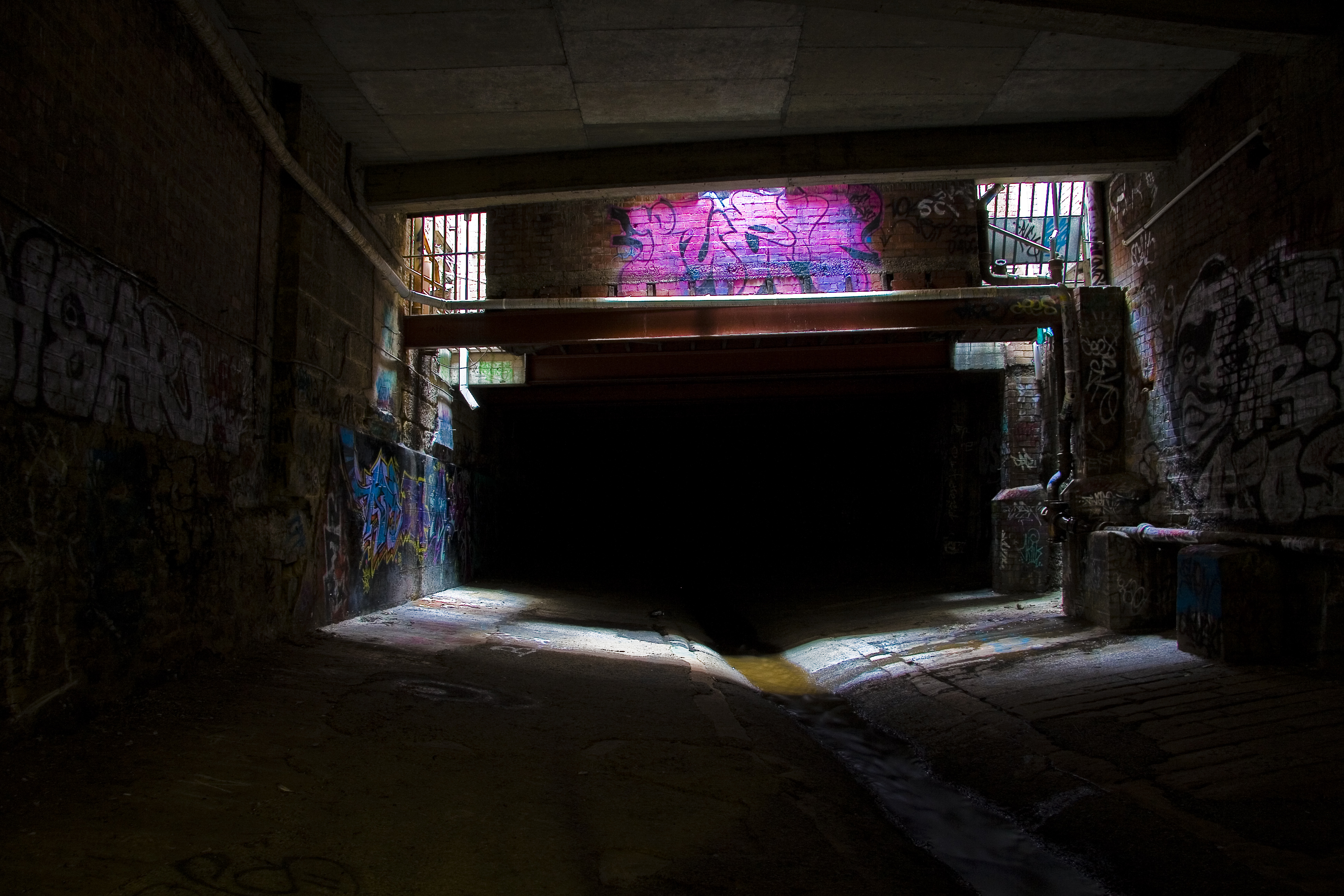
Some urban streams, such as the Hobart Rivulet in Tasmania, run underground for substantial distances

The catchment area, or drainage basin, of a stream collects water flowing over and through the underlying land. As a catchment area urbanizes, more and more of the land draining to that stream is covered in impervious surfaces like concrete, asphalt, and rooftops. These impervious surfaces do not allow rain and snow to be absorbed into the soil, so the water runs across the surfaces instead. Governments build infrastructure deliberately designed to alter the flow or course of this water in and on the urban landscape. The goal of these alterations is to prevent localized flooding by moving water through and out of the city as fast as possible after storms. These changes include the installation of storm drains and storm sewers, as well as direct alterations called river engineering, which include: lining stream beds with concrete or other hardscape materials, or diverting streams into culverts and storm sewers. Some urban streams, such as the subterranean rivers of London, run completely underground.

== Urban Stream Syndrome ==
Urban stream syndrome (USS) describes a consistent pattern of observed ecological degradation of streams caused by urbanization. While the exact impact of urbanization on any given stream will differ substantially across regions depending on local geography and climate, there are some basic commonalities. Urban stream syndrome typically includes increased pollutant inputs, more sediment entering the water, alterations in the stream banks, changes to the biological community of the stream, and changes to the flow rate and discharge amount compared with non-urbanized streams.

=== Pollution ===
Keep in mind the status of water quality is difficult to assess in urban areas because of the complexity of the pollutions sources. This could be from mining and deforestation, but the main cause can be attributed to urban and suburban development. This is because such land use has a domino effect that can be felt tens of kilometers away. Consistent decrease to ecological health of streams can be from many things, but most can be directly or indirectly attributed to human infrastructure and action.

Urban streams also suffer from chemical alterations due to pollutants and waste being uncleanly dumped back into rivers and lakes. An example of this is Onondaga Lake. Historically one of the most polluted freshwater lakes in the world, its salinity and toxic constituents like mercury rose to unsafe levels as large corporations begun to set up shop around the lake. High levels of salinity would be disastrous for any native freshwater marine life and pollutants like mercury are dangerous to most organisms.

Higher levels of urbanization typically mean a greater presence of urban stream syndrome.

=== Hydrology ===
Alterations in hydrology are a consistent feature of urban stream syndrome. As urbanization of a catchment area progresses, the decrease in the pervious surfaces leads to an increase in the surface runoff and rapid flows through storm sewers into streams. These rapid flows into the urban stream lead to flashy hydrographs, where stream levels rise rapidly in response to precipitation events. Other common shifts in hydrology driven by urbanization include lower baseflows. This can cause problems during flood discharges. For example, flood discharges in urban catchments were at least 250% higher in urban catchments than in forested catchments in New York and Texas during similar storms.

== Stressors ==
These modifications have often reduced habitat for fish and other species, caused downstream flooding due to alterations of flood plains, and worsened water quality. Water scarcity makes flow management in the rehabilitation of urban streams problematic.Toxicants, ionic concentrations, available nutrients, temperature (and light), and dissolved oxygen are key stressors to urban streams.

== Restoration efforts ==
Some communities have begun stream restoration projects in an attempt to correct the problems caused by alteration, using techniques such as daylighting and fixing stream bank erosion caused by heavy stormwater runoff. Streamflow augmentation to restore habitat and aesthetics is also an option, and recycled water can be used for this purpose.

=== Treatment ===
Many water managers treat USS by directly addressing the symptoms, most commonly through channel reconfiguration that includes reshaping rock to address altered hydrology and sediment regimes. In spite of having ecological objectives, this approach has been criticized for addressing physical failures in the system without improving ecological conditions.

== See also ==
- Nationwide Urban Runoff Program (NURP) – US research program
- Nonpoint source pollution
- Subterranean river

== Bibliography ==
- Riley, Ann L.; Leopold, Luna B. (1998). Restoring Streams in Cities: A Guide for Planners, Policymakers, and Citizens. Washington, DC: Island Press. ISBN 978-1-55963-042-9.
