= Ministry of Justice and Attorney-General's Office =

Government ministry of Ghana

- Coat of arms of Ghana

Ministry overview
- Formed: 1951; 75 years ago
- Attorney-General’s Department (est. 1877)
- Jurisdiction: Government of Ghana
- Headquarters: Attorney-General & Ministry of Justice Building, Accra, Ghana
- Minister responsible: Dominic Akuritinga Ayine, Attorney General and Minister for Justice
- Website: www.mojagd.gov.gh

The Ministry of Justice and Attorney-General's Office of Ghana is the government ministry responsible for the legal affairs of the Republic of Ghana. It drafts legislation, advises the executive, oversees state prosecutions, and represents the Government of Ghana in civil cases. The office of the Attorney General, established in 1877, serves as the principal legal adviser to the government. The modern Ministry of Justice was created in 1951 following recommendations of the Lidbury Commission.

== History ==
The Ministry of Justice was created in 1951 after the Lidbury Commission reviewed the administration of the Gold Coast Civil Service and recommended a structure modelled on the British Home Office. The first head of the ministry was P. F. Branigan, an English expatriate.

In 1954, the Ministry of Justice was merged with the Ministry of Interior in the first all-African government. It re-emerged in 1956 as the Ministry of Interior and Justice under Ebenezer Ako-Adjei. Following Ghana’s independence in 1957, the ministry was again split, creating a separate Ministry of Justice and an independent Ministry for the Attorney General, led by Geoffrey Bing.

Between 1958 and 1961, the ministry was merged with Local Government under Kofi Asante Ofori-Atta. It became a standalone ministry again in September 1961 and was reunited with the Attorney-General’s Ministry in 1965, forming the combined portfolio of Minister of Justice and Attorney General under Bashiru Kwaw-Swanzy.

In 2004, Mrs Regina Ayerko Apotsi became the first woman to serve as Judicial Secretary, the 13th person to hold the post.

== List of ministers ==
Number	Minister	Portfolio	Took office	Left office	Government	Party
1	Ebenezer Ako-Adjei	Minister for Interior and Justice	1956	August 1957	Nkrumah government	Convention People's Party
1	Ebenezer Ako-Adjei	Minister for Justice	August 1957	1958	Nkrumah government	Convention People's Party
2	Kofi Asante Ofori-Atta	Minister for Justice and Local Government	1958	September 1961	Nkrumah government	Convention People's Party
2	Kofi Asante Ofori-Atta	Minister for Justice	September 1961	1965	Nkrumah government	Convention People's Party
3	Bashiru Kwaw-Swanzy	Minister for Justice and Attorney General	1965	February 1966	Nkrumah government	Convention People's Party
4	Victor Owusu	Minister for Justice and Attorney General	1966	April 1969	National Liberation Council	Military government
5	Nicholas Yaw Boafo Adade	Minister for Justice and Attorney General	April 1969	September 1969	National Liberation Council	Military government
5	Nicholas Yaw Boafo Adade	Minister for Justice and Attorney General	14 September 1969	January 1971	Busia government	Progress Party
6	Victor Owusu	Minister for Justice and Attorney General	January 1971	12 January 1972	Busia government	Progress Party
7	Edward Nathaniel Moore	Minister for Justice and Attorney General	13 January 1972	8 October 1975	National Redemption Council	Military government
8	Gustav Koranteng-Addow	Minister for Justice and Attorney General	9 October 1975	January 1979	Supreme Military Council	Military government
9	Austin N. E. Amissah	Minister for Justice and Attorney General	1 January 1979	23 September 1979	Armed Forces Revolutionary Council	Military government
10	Joe Reindorf	Minister for Justice and Attorney General	24 September 1979	August 1981	Limann government	People's National Party
11	A. L. Djabatey	Minister for Justice and Attorney General	1 October 1981	31 December 1981	Limann government	People's National Party
12	G. E. K. Aikins	Minister for Justice and Attorney General	25 June 1982	1988	Provisional National Defence Council	Military government
13	E. G. Tanoh	Minister for Justice and Attorney General	14 December 1988	1 April 1993	Provisional National Defence Council	Military government
14	Anthony Forson	Minister for Justice and Attorney General	1 March 1993	30 October 1993	Rawlings government	National Democratic Congress
—	Obed Asamoah (Acting AG)	Minister for Justice and Attorney General	November 1993	May 1997	Rawlings government	National Democratic Congress
15	Obed Asamoah	Minister for Justice and Attorney General	May 1997	6 January 2001	Rawlings government	National Democratic Congress
16	Nana Akufo-Addo	Minister for Justice and Attorney General	1 February 2001	24 April 2003	Kufuor government	New Patriotic Party
17	Papa Owusu-Ankomah	Minister for Justice and Attorney General	1 April 2003	2005	Kufuor government	New Patriotic Party
18	J. Ayikoi Otoo	Minister for Justice and Attorney General	1 February 2005	2006	Kufuor government	New Patriotic Party
19	Joe Ghartey	Minister for Justice and Attorney General	16 June 2006	7 January 2009	Kufuor government	New Patriotic Party
20	Betty Mould-Iddrisu [1st female]	Minister for Justice and Attorney General	2009	2011	Mills government	National Democratic Congress
21	Martin Amidu	Minister for Justice and Attorney General	4 January 2011	2012	Mills government	National Democratic Congress
22	Benjamin Kunbuor	Minister for Justice and Attorney General	25 January 2012	24 October 2012	Mills government	National Democratic Congress
22	Benjamin Kunbuor	Minister for Justice and Attorney General	24 October 2012	7 January 2013	Mahama government	National Democratic Congress
23	Marietta Brew Appiah-Oppong	Minister for Justice and Attorney General	February 2013	7 January 2017	Mahama government	National Democratic Congress
24	Gloria Akuffo	Minister for Justice and Attorney General	February 2017	January 2021	Akuffo Addo government	New Patriotic Party
25	Godfred Yeboah Dame	Minister for Justice and Attorney General	January 2021	6 January 2025	Akuffo Addo government	New Patriotic Party
26	Dominic Akuritinga Ayine	22 January 2025	Incumbent		Mahama government	National Democratic Congress

== See also ==
- Attorney General of Ghana
- Justice ministry
- Politics of Ghana
