= Susanna Nyakotey =

Ghanaian district magistrate

District Magistrate, Madina District Court II

District Magistrate
- Appointed by: Judicial Service of Ghana

Secretary, International Association of Women Judges (IAWJ) Ghana Chapter

Legal Officer
- In office 2018–2022

Recorder, Judicial Council and General Legal Council
- In office 2018–2022

Personal details
- Born: Ghana
- Education: University of London (LLB); Ghana School of Law (QCL)
- Alma mater: University of London; Ghana School of Law
- Occupation: Magistrate
- Known for: Secretary, IAWJ Ghana Chapter

Her Worship Susanna Nyakotey is a Ghanaian District Magistrate and the current Secretary of the International Association of Women Judges (IAWJ) Ghana Chapter. She currently presides over the Madina District Court II in Accra.

== Education ==
Nyakotey Susanna holds a Bachelor of laws (LLB) degree from the University of London. She subsequently obtained her Qualifying Certificate in Law from the Ghana School of Law, qualifying her to be admitted to the Ghana Bar.

== Career ==
Nyakotey's career in the Judiciary started in 2008, when she worked in the Circuit Court as an interpreter, a position she held until 2015. This experience foundationally provided her with practical exposure to court proceedings and judicial administration.

She gained additional experience through an internship with the Office of the Attorney General and Ministry of Justice. She also completed her pupillage with Torpey and Associates, a private legal firm.

From 2018-2022, Nyakotey served as a Legal Officer in the Legal Department of the Judicial Service of Ghana. In this period, she also held the positions of Recorder for the Judicial Council and Recorder for the General Legal Council, contributing to the administrative and regulatory functions of Ghana's legal profession.

== See also ==
- Judiciary of Ghana
- High Court of Ghana
