= Tuffour v. Attorney-General =

1980 court case in Ghana

Tuffour v Attorney General
- Court: Supreme Court of Ghana
- Full case name: Tuffour v Attorney-General
- Decided: 23 September 1980
- Citation: [1980] GLR 637

Court membership
- Judges sitting: E. N. P. Sowah; V. C. R. A. C. Crabbe; G. S. Lassey; G. R. M. Francois; K. A. Agyapong

Case opinions
- Decision by: Sowah
- Concurrence: Crabbe; Lassey; Francois; Agyapong

The case of Tuffour v Attorney General is a landmark decision of the Supreme Court of Ghana. The case centers on the controversial dismissal of then, Chief Justice Fred Apaloo by the Parliament of the Third Republic and the subsequent legal challenge that sought to contest this dismissal.

At the core of the dispute is the principle that any act contravening the Constitution is void, a standard the court applied in ruling that the vetting and rejection of Justice Apaloo as Chief Justice violated Article 127(8) of the 1979 Constitution, rendering the parliamentary action null and void.

However, the court also upheld the autonomy of Parliament by affirming that, under Article 96, its proceedings cannot be questioned by the judiciary. Additionally, the case highlights the right of every Ghanaian citizen to protect the constitutional order, affirming their ability to bring an action before the Supreme Court to prevent any subversion of this order.

== Background ==
Fred Kwasi Apaloo was appointed Chief Justice of Ghana by the Supreme Military Council in 1977. In 1979 Ghana returned to civilian rule with the issuing of the 1979 Constitution. After the new Constitution came into force, the President, Hilla Limann in consultation with the Judicial Council nominated Apaloo for the position of Chief Justice, which required parliamentary approval. However, Parliament ultimately rejected his nomination by a 71 to 0 vote.

Before Justice Apaloo's rejection by the Parliament of the Third Republic, no Chief Justice had completed their full term in office until retirement. With the exceptions of Justice Edward Akuffo-Addo (who resigned from the post to be elected president), every Chief Justice had been dismissed by either an incumbent government or a new regime that had come to power.

In response to this rejection, a private citizen Dr. Amoako Tuffour (then senior lecturer of Civil Engineering at the Kwame Nkrumah University of Science and Technology) filed a writ seeking a declaration that, as of 24 September 1979 (when the 1979 constitution came into effect), Justice Apaloo was automatically appointed as Chief Justice of the Republic, thereby becoming both President and a member of the Supreme Court. Additionally, he invoked the original jurisdiction of the Supreme Court, seeking a declaration that the nomination, vetting, and rejection of Mr. Apaloo were inconsistent with Article 127(8) and (9) of the 1979 Constitution (which corresponds to Article 144(1) of the 1992 Constitution), and should therefore be declared null and void.

Dr. Tuffour’s legal team included his lead counsel, Nana Addo Dankwa Akufo-Addo, who later served as President of Ghana, Tsatsu Tsikata a member of the National Democratic Congress, and Dr. Edmund Prempeh, co-founder of the law firm Akufo-Addo, Prempeh and Co. The state was represented by Mr. Joe Reindorf and his deputy, Archibald Lartey Djabatey (who succeeded him as Attorney General).

== Conflict ==
=== Defendant's (Attorney General) defence ===
The Attorney General, Mr. Joe Reindorf, sought to dismiss the case at an early stage by raising a preliminary objection. On the issue of legal standing, he argued that Dr. Tuffour lacked a direct interest in the case and was not the appropriate person to challenge Justice Apaloo’s capacity to serve as Chief Justice, as the issue directly pertained to Justice Apaloo's qualifications adding that Apaloo himself should have brought the action.

As the case proceeded, Reindorf argued that the 1979 constitution marked the beginning of a new legal era, asserting that prior to its enactment, the highest court was the Court of Appeal, and thus no judge could have held the title of Justice or Chief Justice of the Supreme Court. He contended that with the new Constitution establishing the Supreme Court, Justice Apaloo, who had been Chief Justice of the Court of Appeal, needed to go through the nomination process as required by Article 127, which included receiving parliamentary approval for his appointment as both a Justice of the Supreme Court and as Chief Justice.

Additionally, Reindorf argued that the process outlined in Article 127 was mandatory and that Apaloo's rejection followed this required procedure. Therefore, by appearing before the Parliamentary Appointment Committee, Justice Apaloo had effectively waived any constitutional immunity and should accept the consequences of his actions.

On jurisdiction, the Attorney General claimed that the Supreme Court was not properly constituted to interpret the Constitution, as it was an Appeal Court sitting as a Supreme Court.

Furthermore, the Attorney General contested the Speaker of Parliament, Jacob Hackenburg Griffiths-Randolph's ability to be sued as a defendant. He stated that according to Article 96 of the Constitution, no court, including the current one, had the authority to question what happens in Parliament.

=== Plaintiff's (Tuffour's counsel) response ===
Leading counsel for the plaintiff argued that none of the objections raised by the Attorney-General had any merit whatsoever. To him the nature of Dr. Tuffour's (the plaintiff) writ was an action seeking an interpretation, an enforcement of certain provisions of the Constitution. The issue was whether the Chief Justice was a “transitional” holder of the office or the substantive holder. The tenure of his office and the terms of that tenure were of interest to every Ghanaian.

On the issue of interest he countered by asserting that Dr. Tuffuor was enforcing constitutional provisions regarding the tenure of the Chief Justice, a matter of national interest. The end result was that all Ghanaians were interested in the tenure of office of the Chief Justice.

On jurisdiction, he asserted that the court was appropriately exercising its constitutional authority under Article 118, which is directly connected to Article 2, the primary mechanism for enforcing the Constitution. He maintained that these articles should be interpreted in tandem to ensure the Constitution is upheld. Furthermore, he contended that postponing the enforcement of Article 2 until the full appointment of the Supreme Court would unjustly hinder citizens from exercising their rights during that period.

On the matter of the Speaker’s competence to be sued, Tuffour's counsel argued that the Speaker was part of parliament and not a member of parliament and that if the Speaker could not be taken to court, it would mean that Parliament's actions could never be challenged in court. They also pointed out that this case was not just a typical civil or criminal matter, referring to a past case, Ahenkora v. Ofe, to back up their point.

== Verdict ==
The court first confirmed its jurisdiction over the case and determined that the plaintiff, Dr. Tuffour, does not require a special interest to initiate a lawsuit, provided they are a Ghanaian citizen, a fact that was duly established.

Following this, the court addressed and rejected the Attorney General's arguments concerning Justice Apaloo's status as Chief Justice. Specifically, it dismissed the contention that Justice Apaloo was merely the Chief Justice of the Court of Appeal and, therefore, ineligible to serve as Chief Justice under the 1979 Constitution. The court ruled that the Chief Justice, by virtue of his position as the head of the judiciary, presides over all courts within the superior court of judicature, irrespective of any specific appointments to individual courts. Furthermore, the court observed that, despite the judiciary losing one of its departments in the decade preceding the 1979 Constitution, it remained unified as a single superior court of judicature.

Subsequently, the court affirmed Justice Apaloo's status as the substantive Chief Justice under the 1979 Constitution and further rejected the argument that his appearance before the appointments committee of Parliament implied an acceptance of the potential consequences. The court clarified that the Chief Justice's decision to appear before Parliament did not affect the interpretation of the relevant constitutional provision unless such actions aligned with the principles of the Constitution.

Moreover, the court went on to interpret the phrase "shall be deemed" in Article 127(8) of the 1979 Constitution in its plain meaning, which implies that something is treated as true with all corresponding consequences, even if it is not factually so. Consequently, the court concluded that a justice of the superior court holding office immediately prior to the implementation of the 1979 Constitution should continue in their role as if they had been formally appointed under the new Constitution. As a result, Justice Apaloo, who was the head of the superior court before the Constitution's enactment, automatically assumed the role of Chief Justice without requiring parliamentary approval.

Finally, the court addressed the Attorney General's objection regarding the involvement of the Speaker of Parliament. The court upheld this objection, reasoning that the judiciary is not empowered to question parliamentary proceedings. Once Parliament has completed its business, it is considered final. This principle, enshrined in Articles 96, 97, 98, 99, 103, and 104 of the Constitution, precludes the courts from reviewing how Parliament conducts its affairs. Consequently, the Speaker was deemed an inappropriate party to the case, leading the court to order his removal from the proceedings.

== Aftermath ==
With these rulings, Justice Apaloo's path were removed, enabling him to continue serving as Chief Justice until his retirement in 1986. He became the first Chief Justice in Ghana's history to complete his full term and retire.

The Tuffuor v. Attorney General case became a landmark in Ghanaian legal history, recognized as the locus classicus of constitutional interpretation. Justice Sowah's observation that a written constitution is a "living organism capable of growth and development" has since become a foundational principle in the interpretation of the Constitution. His assertion that every word in the Constitution holds significance and must be given effect has been repeatedly cited by the Supreme Court of Ghana in its subsequent rulings on constitutional matters.
