= Edward Amoako Asante =

Justice Edward Amoako Asante JSC

Justice of the Supreme Court of Ghana
- Incumbent
- Assumed office 10 September 2026
- Nominated by: John Mahama

Justice of the Court of Appeal
- In office August 2020 – 10 September 2026
- Nominated by: Nana Akuffo Addo

Justice of the High Court
- In office 2008 – August 2020
- Nominated by: John Kufuor

Personal details
- Born: December 1, 1963 (age 62) Accra, Ghana
- Education: Oda Senior High School; Sefwi Wiawso Senior High School; Mfantsipim School
- Alma mater: University of Ghana; Ghana School of Law
- Profession: Judge

Edward Amoako Asante is a Ghanaian jurist who serves as a justice of the Supreme Court of Ghana. He previously served as a justice of the Court of Appeal of Ghana and spent six years as the president of the Community Court of Justice of ECOWAS in Abuja, Nigeria.

== Early Life and Education ==
Asante was born on 1 December, 1963, at Sefwi Wiawso in the Western North Region of Ghana. He began his formal education at the Anglican Experimental School in Sefwi Wiawso, and St. Anthony Catholic Primary School in Akyem Oda, where he had his basic education prior to attending Oda Secondary School. He later continued at Sefwi Wiawso Secondary School where he obtained his GCE Ordinary Level certificate and Mfantsipim School in Cape Coast, obtaining his Advanced Level certificate in 1985.

He proceeded to the University of Ghana, Legon, where he earned a Bachelor of Laws (LL.B. Hons) degree between 1986 and 1989. He then undertook his professional legal training at the Ghana School of Law in Accra from 1989 to 1991 and was subsequently called to the Ghana Bar as a Barrister-at-Law.

Asante has received training in Legislative Strategic Management at the International Law Institute in Washington, D.C., and the London Summer Arbitration School at The Arbitration Lab in the United Kingdom in 2025. He also completed studies in Private International Law (2024) and Public International Law (2023) at The Hague Academy of International Law.

== Career ==
Asante had his national service at Government School 'D' Junior High School in Sefwi Wiawso from 1985 to 1986, where he taught Economics and French. He began his formal legal career as a Legal Officer at the Legal Aid Board in Kumasi from October 1991 to August 1992, before entering private practice at Mmieh & Co and Obeng Manu & Co between August 1992 and October 1998. He also served as Legal Officer at CashPro Company Limited in Kumasi and Accra from October 1996 to October 2002.

In October 2002, Asante joined the Ghanaian judiciary as a Circuit Court Judge in Obuasi, Ashanti Region. From 2003 to 2008, he served as an additional Magistrate at the District Courts in Manso Nkwanta and Fomena. He was appointed a justice of the High Court (Fast Track Division) in Accra in March 2008, later serving as the Supervising High Court Judge for Sekondi-Takoradi from October 2013 to July 2018. In August 2020, he was elevated to the Court of Appeal of Ghana.

In August 2018, Asante was appointed to the Community Court of Justice of ECOWAS in Abuja, Nigeria, serving as a judge of the regional tribunal and as its president for six years. During his tenure, he addressed staff promotion backlogs, recruited research officers, instituted online hearings during the COVID-19 pandemic to eliminate travel costs and case backlogs, and initiated the development of an automated electronic case management system.

Internationally, he was appointed in October 2025 to serve a term on the Advisory Committee of the United Nations Human Rights Council in Geneva, Switzerland. He has also held religious and administrative leadership positions, including Chancellor of the Anglican Diocese of Sekondi from 2014 to 2024, Chancellor from 2009 to 2010 and Registrar from 2006 to 2009 of the Anglican Diocese of Sefwi Wiawso, and Governing Council Member of St. Nicholas Seminary in Cape Coast from 2008 to 2014.

== Supreme Court Appointment ==
=== Nomination ===
In August 2026, President John Dramani Mahama nominated Asante for appointment to the Supreme Court of Ghana pursuant to Article 144(2) of the 1992 Constitution. His nomination was referred to Parliament's Appointments Committee alongside nominees Justice Sophia Rosetta Bernasko-Essah and Justice Anthony Forson Jnr.

=== Vetting ===
On 27 August 2026, Asante appeared before Parliament's Appointments Committee for his vetting. Throughout the session, he discussed key legal and constitutional matters, with emphasis on judicial independence and the importance of personal integrity throughout his 35-year legal career. On judicial modernization, he advocated for integrating AI into court operations while stressing the necessity of human oversight and tailored jurisprudence. Addressing legal principles, he traced the evolution of spousal property rights, distinguished International Humanitarian Law from International Law, and highlighted constitutional supremacy through landmark cases like Tuffour v. Attorney-General. Furthermore, he addressed court administration by opposing the decoupling of the chief justice's duties, clarified the enforceability of fundamental human rights compared to directive principles, and affirmed that all offenses remain bailable without requiring a standalone Bail Act.

=== Approval ===
Following the vetting, the Appointments Committee recommended Asante's approval on 27 August 2026. The chairperson confirmed that despite the Minority caucus's non-participation in the vetting, the proceedings satisfied the legal quorum under Article 102 and the voting threshold under Article 104 of the 1992 Constitution, with six out of eleven members present. Parliament subsequently approved his nomination by a Majority Decision of Members Present and Voting.

=== Swearing-in ===
On Thursday, 10 September 2026, Asante was officially sworn into office as a justice of the Supreme Court of Ghana by President John Dramani Mahama at the Jubilee House in Accra, alongside Justices Sophia Rosetta Bernasko-Essah and Anthony Forson Jnr. Administering the oath of office, President Mahama charged the new justices to uphold the Constitution, safeguard judicial independence, and restore public trust in the judiciary without fear or favor.

== Awards and honours ==
As a Grand Fellow of the Institute of Security and Strategic Studies in Abuja, he was awarded the African Bar Medal of Merit Award in Leadership by the African Bar Association in Lilongwe, Malawi, in August 2022, alongside an Award for Excellence in Leadership, Peace and Community Development from the Peace Achievers International Awards.

== Personal Life ==
Asante is married to Mrs. Gifty Asante and has five children. He is fluent in English, Sefwi, and Asante Twi. He is a Christian and a member of the Anglican Church. His hobbies include playing lawn tennis, watching local films, and watching football. He serves as a patron of several sports clubs, including the Atomic Tennis Club in Accra, the Hill Club Tennis Club in Cape Coast, the Army Mess Tennis Club in Accra, and the GHACEM Tennis Club in Takoradi, and is a member of the 4 Garrison Tennis Club in Kumasi.
