= Obed Asamoah =

Ghanaian lawyer and politician

Hon. Obed Asamoah
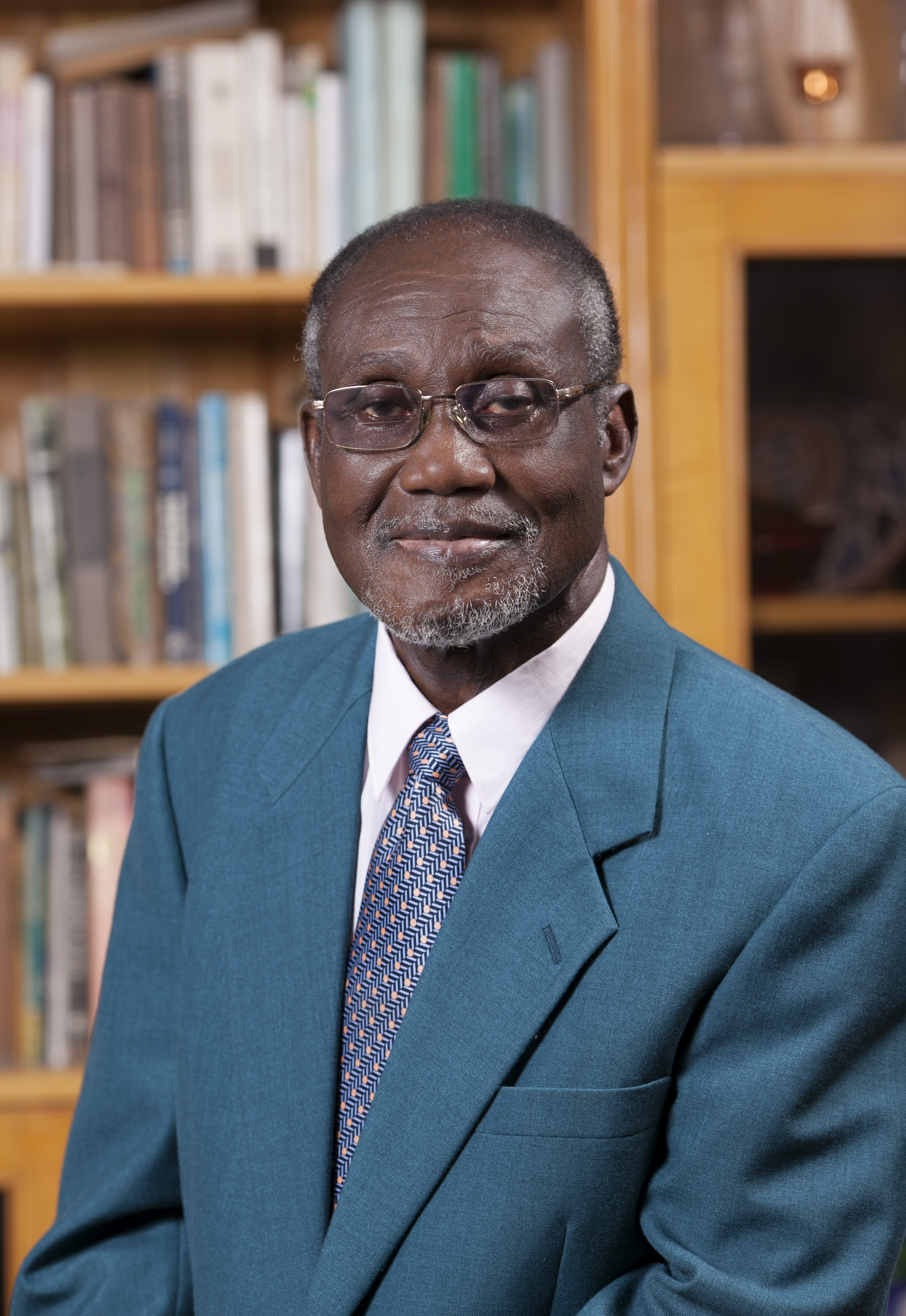
- Official portrait, 2008

15th Attorney General of Ghana and Minister for Justice
- In office May 1997 – 6 January 2001
- President: Jerry John Rawlings
- Preceded by: Himself
- Succeeded by: Nana Akufo-Addo
- In office Acting: November 1993 – May 1997
- President: Jerry John Rawlings
- Preceded by: Anthony Forson
- Succeeded by: Himself

Minister for Foreign Affairs
- In office 1982–1997
- President: Jerry John Rawlings
- Preceded by: Isaac K. Chinebuah
- Succeeded by: Kwamena Ahwoi

Member of Ghana Parliament for Biakoye Constituency
- In office October 1969 – January 1972

Personal details
- Born: Obed Yao Asamoah; 6 February 1936 (age 90) Likpe, Volta Region, Gold Coast
- Party: National Democratic Congress
- Other political affiliations: United National Convention (UNC); All Peoples Party (APP); Democratic Freedom Party (DFP)
- Spouse: Yvonne Asamoah
- Children: 3
- Education: Achimota School; Woolwich Polytechnic School
- Alma mater: King's College London; Columbia University
- Profession: Lawyer
- Website: Official website

Obed Yao Asamoah (born 6 February 1936) is a Ghanaian lawyer, academic and politician. Asamoah was the longest serving foreign minister and Attorney General of Ghana under Jerry Rawlings from 1981 to 1997. Asamoah was educated at King's College London and at Columbia University.

== Early life and education ==
He was born the tenth child of William Kofi Asamoah and Monica Akosua Asamoah, farmers of Bala in the Likpe Traditional Area, a Guan community of the Oti Region of Ghana on 6 February 1936. His mother, was the second wife of his father following the death of his first wife, who bore him two girls. His mother was married young after being spirited out of Ejisu in Ashanti. She was the daughter of an Ejisu chief who married a woman taken from Likpe during the Ashanti invasions of the Volta Region. Asamoah's childhood life as described was an interesting one and his aspirations to become a lawyer started whilst a child, as described in a narration;

"He was argumentative and active in childhood teenage years. Everyone said he had to be a lawyer, and he looked forward to being one. On one occasion when elders of the village had to settle a dispute between his father and the owner of an adjoining land who had uprooted plants demarcating boundaries in an effort to trespass onto their land, the arbitrators planned to otherwise demarcate the portion of the boundary where the plants had been uprooted, but he suggested that they should go over the entire boundary in case the neighbour intended to uproot some more. The elders congratulated him for making a clever suggestion that would forestall similar disputes in the future. He was celebrated as a budding lawyer. Later, he also ruled against his mother in a dispute between her and one of his father’s two daughters by his father's first wife. His mother expected partisanship from him, but she did not get it. His fairness was appreciated, although certainly not by his mother."

Under the guidance of his elder brother, Asamoah passed the Common Entrance Examination in 1949, after primary school education. Then, he had to undergo an interview process with the officials of the secondary school along with the other pupils from the Volta Region seeking admission. This was held in Ho on the campus of Mawuli School, It was there that he met his lifelong friend Capt. Kojo Tsikata, who had also arrived for the interview, from Keta. When the results of the interviews were released, he found out that he had gained admission to Achimota School, and so had Kojo Tsikata.

He took the O' level Latin in 1955, and proceeded to Britain in 1956 to complete the sixth form at Woolwich Polytechnic before going on admission to King's College, London University where he earned a bachelor of Laws degree (LLB) with honours in 1960. He also enrolled at the Middle Temple Inn of Court for the professional qualification. While at the university, he also became a member of the Middle Temple Inn of Court. Three years went by soon enough, and he graduated, took the Bar examinations, and passed. He obtained his LL.M and Doctor of Juridical Science (JSD) at Columbia University in New York in 1967. His JSD thesis was on the legal significance of the declarations of the General Assembly of the United Nations.

== Career ==
His childhood inclination for law eventually won the race and he became a lawyer. When he was a student at Columbia Law School, he developed a friendship with one Reginald Bannerman, who, together with Justice Bruce-Lyle and him, later formed the legal partnership of Bruce-Lyle, Bannerman, and Asamoah, Attorneys.

Asamoah returned to Ghana where he entered into academia in 1965, He became a lecturer in law at the University of Ghana. Some of his famous students include the late former President of Ghana, Prof. John Evans Atta Mills, Tsatsu Tsikata, Nana Addo Dankwa Akufo-Addo, President of Ghana.

When he resigned from the University of Ghana in 1969, he worked as a partner in this firm until he was appointed a Secretary (Minister) in the Rawlings government in 1982. His legal association with Reginald Bannerman started when they were both pupils in the law chambers of Edward Akufo-Addo, a renowned lawyer, on his return from England in 1960. Edward Akufo-Addo was later to become the Chief Justice in the latter part of the First Republic and President of Ghana in the Second Republic.

== Political career ==
During his secondary school years in Achimota he had an eye opening event into the political world as there was the fight for independence in the midst of all the colonial rule and political disputes. He grew up to become a political figure in Ghana, from being a member of the constituent assembly, member of parliament, Minister of foreign affairs, Attorney General of Ghana and Minister for Justice and the chairman of the National Democratic Congress.

=== Member of parliament ===
Asamoah's active involvement in politics began 1966 after Ghana's first president Dr. Kwame Nkrumah was overthrown. He served as a member of the Constituent Assembly of 1968, and also the Consultative Assembly of 1978, in both assemblies the charge was to draft new constitutions following the period of military rule.

He was a member of Parliament for the Biakoye constituency, from 1969 to 1972, during the 2nd Republic of Ghana serving as the Shadow Minister for Foreign Affairs. Asamoah's Ashanti lineage gave rise to misinterpretations of his political alliances and sympathies during this period. An example was when it fuelled speculation after the 1969 elections that he had defected to the Progress Party, led by Dr. Kofi Abrefa Busia which won massively in Ashanti and other Akan areas of Ghana. He had, however, won a seat in the Volta Region on the ticket of the National Alliance of Liberals (NAL), led by Komla Agbeli Gbedemah, a veteran associate of Dr. Kwame Nkrumah. The speculation was undoubtedly fuelled by some suggestions in the press that, given the Akan-versus-Ewe schism demonstrated by the results of the elections, it was advisable for Dr. Busia to appoint him to his cabinet. Even now he is often labelled a Danquah-Busia offshoot. Admittedly, this is also founded on the fact that he was the General Secretary of the United National Convention (UNC), led by a veteran Danquah-Busia politician, Mr. William Ofori Atta (Paa Willie), and subsequently the General Secretary of the All People's Party (APP), formed by the merger of the UNC with the Popular Front Party (PFP) in 1981, under the leadership of Mr. Victor Owusu, another Danquah-Busia stalwart. Within this period Asamoah also served as the General Secretary of the United National Convention (UNC) from 1979 to 1981 and of the All Peoples Party (APP) in 1981.

=== Minister of state (1982-2001) ===
==== Minister of Foreign Affairs ====
In 1982, he was appointed the Secretary for Foreign Affairs by the Provisional National Defence Council (PNDC) headed by Flt. Lt. Rawlings. After Ghana went back into multi party democracy in 1993 through his party head by Jerry Rawlings, he was maintained in that role as Minister for Foreign Affairs and due to that makes him the longest-serving Foreign Affairs Minister as he served in that role from 1982 till 1997, when he was fully reappointed to serve as Attorney General and Minister for Justice.

==== Attorney General of Ghana and Minister for Justice ====
Prior to leaving the foreign Affairs ministry and being appointed to serve as Attorney General of Ghana and Minister for Justice, he had acted in that role from 1993 to 1997 under Jerry Rawlings. He served in this role from 1997 till his party left public office in January 2001.

=== National Democratic Congress ===
Asamoah was a key figure and instrumental in the formation and growth of the National Democratic Congress (NDC) in 1993 ahead of the 1993 Ghanaian elections as Ghana was going back into multi party democracy. In 2002, Asamoah replaced Rawlings as head of the opposition National Democratic Congress (NDC), beating former defense minister Alhaji Mahama Iddrisu by just 2 votes. In 2006, he lost his chairmanship position in the party. Not long after the defeat, he later resigned from the party. Asamoah was accused by his party members and other political parties of stealing a huge sum of money from the coffers of the NDC, which he had reported lost from his bedroom in 2004. On 28 August 2006, he and other politicians, most of whom also resigned from the NDC, launched a new political party, the Democratic Freedom Party (DFP) of which he is the life Patron. Despite speculation that Asamoah would run for President in 2008, he declared that he never intended to run for the presidency and would not seek the Presidency but instead work to win victory for his party in that year's national elections. In October 2011, Dr. Obed Asamoah and his Democratic Freedom Party (DFP) re-joins the National Democratic Congress (NDC) which he helped form. He described as "wasteful thinking", suggestions that the DFP merged with the NDC because of ministerial appointment offers. He said the decision by the party to re-unite with the NDC is purely based on the growing internal democracy within the NDC.

== Personal life ==
Asamoah's maternal relatives now inhabit Donoaso in Ejisu, whose chief today is Nana Okyere Baffour II and a relation of his. The Ejisu family are descendants of Yaa Asantewaa. Obed Asamoah's family connection with Ejisu continues in exchanges of visits and attendance at funerals by both sides. Asamoah is married to Dr. Yvonne Asamoah, an African American from Syracuse, New York. Together they have a daughter and two sons. He currently resides in Accra, Ghana.

== Author ==
Asamoah being an avid reader and legal academic has authored several publications and books. He is the author of The Legal Significance of the Declarations of the General Assembly of the United Nations, which he wrote for his thesis in 1966. He is also the author The Political History of Ghana (1950-2013) The Experience of a Non-Conformist, which he gives an account of his life and struggles within the Gold Coast through colonial rule and fight for independence and the future rivalry between the Convention Peoples Party (CPP) of Dr. Kwame Nkrumah and the United Gold Coast Convention (UGCC) led by Dr. Danquah and other relevant events in the Ghana's history.

== See also ==
- List of MPs elected in the 1969 Ghanaian parliamentary election
- Minister for Foreign Affairs (Ghana)
- Attorney General of Ghana
- Provisional National Defence Council
- National Democratic Congress (Ghana)
- Democratic Freedom Party

== Sources ==
- The Democratic Freedom Party
- The Political History of Ghana; The experience of a Non-Conformist
- Ghana's opposition gets new leader, BBC News, 29 April 2002
- "Obed Asamoah: I've no interest in the presidency" 25 October 2006, The New Statesman

Political offices
Preceded by Dr. Isaac K. Chinebuah	Foreign Minister; 1982 – 1997	Succeeded by Kwamena Ahwoi
Preceded by G.E.K. Aikins	Attorney General and Minister for Justice; 1993 – 2001	Succeeded by Nana Akufo-Addo
Party political offices
New title	Leader of Democratic Freedom Party; 2006 – present	Incumbent
