= Charles Blois =

Charles Blois may refer to:

- Sir Charles Blois, 1st Baronet (1657–1738), British Tory politician
- Charles of Blois (1319–1364) "the Saint", legalist Duke of Brittany
- Sir Charles Blois, 2nd Baronet (1733–1760), of the Blois baronets
- Sir Charles Blois, 3rd Baronet (1692–1761), of the Blois baronets
- Sir Charles Blois, 6th Baronet (1766–1850), of the Blois baronets
- Sir Charles Blois, 7th Baronet (1794–1855), of the Blois baronets
- Sir Charles Nicholas Gervase Blois, 11th Baronet (born 1939), of the Blois baronets

== See also ==
- Blois (surname)
