= Sophia Rosetta Bernasko-Essah =

Ghanaian judge

Justice Sophia Rosetta Bernasko-Essah JSC

Justice of the Supreme Court of Ghana
- Incumbent
- Assumed office 10 September 2026
- Nominated by: John Mahama

Justice of the Court of Appeal
- In office 17 September 2019 – 10 September 2026
- Nominated by: Nana Akuffo Addo

Justice of the High Court
- In office July 2011 – 17 September 2019
- Nominated by: John Atta Mills

Personal details
- Born: July 19, 1965 (age 61) Accra, Ghana
- Education: Wesley Girls High School
- Alma mater: University of Ghana; Ghana School of Law; Warwick University; Kofi Annan International Peacekeeping Training Centre (KAIPTC)
- Profession: Judge

Sophia Rosetta Oduokuwa Bernasko-Essah is a Ghanaian judge who serves as a Justice of the Supreme Court of Ghana. Prior to her appointment to the Supreme Court, she had served as a member of the High Court bench and the Appeal Court bench.

== Early life and education ==
Bernasko-Essah was born on 19 July 1965 in Accra but hails from Cape Coast in the Central Region of Ghana.

She had her early education at Achimota Preparatory School from 1971 until 1977 when she wrote her common entrance examination. She then proceeded to the Wesley Girls' High School where she obtained her Ordinary Level and Advanced Level certificates in 1982 and 1984 respectively. In 1985, she entered the University of Ghana where she graduated with a Bachelor of Laws (LL.B.) degree in 1988, and received her Qualifying Certificate in Law (B.L.) from the Ghana School of Law in 1990. From September 1997 to September 1998, she studied at Warwick University on a British Chevening Scholarship where she earned a Master of Laws (LLM) in International Economic Law. In 2017, she obtained an Executive Master of Arts in Conflict, Peace, and Security from the Kofi Annan International Peacekeeping Training Centre (KAIPTC) in Accra.

== Career ==
Bernasko-Essah began her career with the Ghana Education Service as a teacher from 1984 to 1985. Following her call to the bar in 1990, had her mandatory National Service at the Ghana Judiciary Service from 1990 to 1991. In April 1992, she worked as a State Attorney in the Ministry of Justice's Attorney General's Department, where she spent nearly twenty years providing statutory legal advice to state agencies, conducting public prosecutions, and representing the government in civil cases. Following her studies abroad, she was appointed State Attorney, serving between September 1998 and April 2000. During the course of her tenure, she provided statutory legal advice, conducted public prosecutions, and represented the government in civil cases.

In 2000, Bernasko-Essah transitioned to corporate law, serving as Senior Legal Counsel at the Volta River Authority until 2004. She then joined the Tema Oil Refinery, working as Legal Services Manager from 2004 to 2007 and a Solicitor from 2007 to 2011.

In July 2011, she joined the judiciary following her appointment as a High Court Judge, serving in Accra within the General Jurisdiction and Commercial Divisions. She was appointed justice of the Court of Appeal on 17 December 2019, after eight years on the High Court bench. At the Appeal Court bench, she presided over the appeal court panel in the Central and Western regions between 2025 and 2026.

Since 2012, she has served as Chancellor of the Anglican Diocese of Accra. Her key judicial leadership roles include serving as Secretary for the Ghana Chapter of the IAWJ from 2012 to 2016, Chairperson of the Judicial Service's Gender Equality Committee, Chairperson of the Users Committee on Gender-Based Violence and Juvenile Justice, and a member of the Election Management Committee.

She represented Ghana at major global judicial forums, including IAWJ Biennial Conferences in Washington, D.C. and Buenos Aires, the NAWJ Conference in Nashville, and the Commonwealth Convention on Advancing Economic, Social and Cultural Rights.

== Supreme Court Appointment ==
=== Nomination ===
In July 2024, President Nana Addo Dankwa Akufo-Addo nominated Bernasko-Essah to the Supreme Court of Ghana, where she underwent parliamentary vetting by the Appointments Committee but did not receive approval due to the conclusion of the parliamentary term and the election period. She was re-nominated by President John Mahamah and referred to Parliament's Appointments Committee for vetting on 16 July 2026 alongside Justice Edward Amoako Asante and Justice Anthony Forson Jnr..

=== Vetting ===
On Thursday 27 August 2026, Bernasko-Essah was vetted by the Parliament's Appointments Committee. During her appearance before the committee, she was questioned on whether the Supreme Court should depart from its previous decisions; she explained that the Supreme Court was required to do so when circumstances warranted it under Article 129(3) of the 1992 Constitution. She added that judicial precedents were essential for ensuring legal certainty, predictability, and stability. She also explained that the Supreme Court must depart from prior rulings when; a precedent results in or continues to result in injustice, when there may have been an error in principle, when the decision may be inconsistent with the Constitution, and when the precedent may prove unworkable.

=== Approval ===
On Friday 28 August 2026, the Appointments Committee presented its report recommending the approval of Justice Bernasko-Essah alongside Justices Edward Amoako Asante and Anthony Forson Jnr. The Committee's Chairperson confirmed that despite the Minority members' decision not to participate in the vetting process, the proceedings maintained a legal quorum under Article 102 of the 1992 Constitution, with six out of the eleven total members present satisfying the constitutional voting threshold required by Article 104. Without any dissenting votes recorded among those present, the Committee unanimously resolved to endorse the nominee. Parliament subsequently approved her nomination by a Majority Decision of Members Present and Voting.

=== Swearing-in ===
On Thursday, 10 September 2026, Bernasko-Essah was officially sworn into office as a Justice of the Supreme Court of Ghana by President John Dramani Mahama at the Jubilee House in Accra, alongside Justice Edward Amoako Asante and Justice Anthony Forson Jnr. Administering the oath of office, President Mahama charged the new justices to defend the Constitution, safeguard judicial independence, and restore public confidence in the justice system by administering justice without fear or favor. He also emphasised the Supreme Court's role as the final judicial authority of the country and urged the bench to embrace technology and reforms to enhance the efficiency and accessibility of justice across the country.

== Personal life ==
Bernasko-Essah is a Christian and a member of the Anglican Church, having served as the Chancellor of the Anglican Diocese of Accra since 2012. She is married and has four children. She is fluent in English, and also speaks Fante and Ga.
