= Patrick Dankwa Anin =

Ghanaian politician (1928–1999)

Minister for Foreign Affairs
- In office 1969
- Prime Minister: Kofi Abrefa Busia
- Preceded by: John Willie Kofi Harlley
- Succeeded by: Victor Owusu
- In office 1969–1971
- Preceded by: Victor Owusu
- Succeeded by: Victor Owusu

Supreme Court of Ghana Judge
- In office 1971–1972
- Appointed by: Edward Akufo-Addo
- Preceded by: Henry K. Prempeh
- Succeeded by: Supreme Court replaced by Appeals Court
- In office 24 October 1980 – July 1982
- Appointed by: Hilla Limann
- Succeeded by: Nicholas Yaw Boafo Adade

Personal details
- Born: 27 July 1928
- Died: 24 October 1999 (aged 71)
- Party: Progress Party

Patrick Dankwa Anin (27 July 1928 – 24 October 1999) was a foreign minister of Ghana in the Second Republic.

Anin was the first foreign minister to be appointed in the Progress Party government by Dr. Kofi Abrefa Busia, the Prime Minister of Ghana. He served for a few months and was replaced by Victor Owusu. He was reappointed later the same year and held the position for two years.

Anin served on a five-man Presidential Commission into Bribery and Corruption in 1970.

He also served as a Supreme Court judge from 1980 after having been nominated by President Limann.

He died on 24 October 1999.

== Works ==
- Anin, Patrick Dankwa (1991). "The role of the judiciary in the promotion and protection of human rights : the Gambian experience". African Journal of International and Comparative Law. 3 (4): 771–784.

== See also ==
- List of judges of the Supreme Court of Ghana
- Supreme Court of Ghana
- Minister for Foreign Affairs (Ghana)

Parliament of Ghana
Vacant Parliament suspended	Member of Parliament; 1969 – 1972	Vacant Parliament suspended
Political offices
Preceded by John Willie Kofi Harlley	Foreign Minister; 1969	Succeeded by Victor Owusu
Preceded by Victor Owusu	Foreign Minister; 1969 – 1971	Succeeded by Victor Owusu
