= Blois (disambiguation) =

Blois is the capital of Loir-et-Cher department in central France.

Blois may also refer to:

- Blois family, major landowners in Suffolk
- Blois Football 41, a French football club
- Château of Blois, a Château in the city of Blois

== Surname ==
- Blois baronets
- Charles Blois (disambiguation)

== See also ==
- Bloise, a similar surname
