= Bloise =

Bloise is a surname used in Italy, France and Spain. The surname is also frequently used by Sephardic Jews. It originates from the French word Blois which was a given name in the medieval period.

Notable people with the surname include:

- Carlos Renan Bloise Serra, known as Carlos Renan (born 1983), Brazilian football player
- Carmen García Bloise (1937–1994), Spanish trade unionist and politician
- Elsa Bloise (1925/1926–2018), Argentine theatre actress
