= Inigo Bing =

British judge

Inigo Geoffrey Bing (born 1 April 1944) is a retired judge.

== Biography ==
Bing is the son of Geoffrey Henry Cecil Bing, CMG QC and Christian Frances Blois, daughter of Sir Ralph Barrett Macnaghten Blois, 9th Baronet.

Inigo Bing's early education was at St Olave's Grammar School in Southwark. He graduated from the University of Birmingham with an LLB degree in law in 1966. He was called to the Bar by the Inner Temple in 1967. Between 2012 and 2017 he studied history and philosophy at Birkbeck, University of London, gaining a BA (1st class honours) and an MA (distinction).

Bing was a Labour Party member of Lambeth London Borough Council between 1971 and 1978. He stood for the Social Democratic Party (SDP) in the 1983 General Election and the 1987 General Election for Braintree, and came second each time to Tony Newton of the Conservative Party.

Bing was a District Judge (formerly Metropolitan Stipendiary Magistrate) from 1989 to 2000. He was a Recorder from 1996 to 2000. Bing was a Circuit Judge on the South Eastern Circuit from 2000 to 2012, sitting at Snaresbrook Crown Court.

Bing was elected a Bencher of the Inner Temple in 2012. He is the author of Criminal Procedure and Sentencing in the Magistrates' Court (1990). In 2020 he published 'Populism on Trial' (Biteback Publishing) a polemical book about the danger of populism to the rule of law in the United Kingdom. In 2022 his second book, 'The Ten Legal Cases that Made Modern Britain' was published also by Biteback.

Bing has also, on a previous occasion, expressed concern over what he perceived to be an urge to over-legislate in the UK. He explained to his audience, at The Heritage Foundation in Washington D.C., that:

'I want to suggest to you that there is a noticeable and concerning trend in Britain to fill the statute book full of new criminal laws, that such a trend is inconsistent with modern liberal values, that this trend has had a deleterious influence on the delivery of criminal justice, and that such overcriminalization is actually adversely affecting some traditional concepts of justice. In endeavoring to answer the question why there is such an appetite for over-legislation in the field of criminal law I will suggest it is, in many cases, a short-sighted and ill-thought-out way of responding to transient public opinion on particular topics.'

== Personal life ==
In 1980, he married Shirley-Anne Holmes (née Benka). She died in 2003 and he married Judith Warwick in 2004. The marriage was dissolved and in 2019 he married Mary Honeyball, a former Labour Member of the European Parliament.
