= Esther Cobbah =

Ghanaian communication specialist

Esther Ambah Numaba cobbah
- Born: Sekondi-Takoradi
- Occupation: Communication Specialist

Esther Ambah Numaba Cobbah is a Ghanaian communication specialist. In 2022 she won the Woman of the Year award at the Ghana Outstanding Women Awards event. She is the founder of Strategic Communications Africa Limited (Stratcomm Africa) and the president of the International Public Relations Association (IPRA). She authored the book Dare to Be.

== Early life and education ==
Cobbah was born in Sekondi, in the Western Region of Ghana. She attended primary school in Komenda in the Central region of Ghana, after her parents settled there. She attended Wesley Girl's High School. Cobbah is a graduate of the University of Ghana, Legon, as well as Cornell University in New York.

== Recognition and awards ==
- Best communication Entrepreneur of the Year (2011)
- Chartered Institute of Marketing Ghana (CIMG) Marketing Woman of the Year (2012)
- Outstanding Corporate Woman of the Year at the 2013 Ghana Women's Awards
- Institute of Public Relations Ghana, Public Relations Personality of the Year (2013)
- Public Relations Consultancy of the Year 2013 Award (Stratcomm Africa)
- Outstanding woman of the year at GOWA, 2022

== Personal life ==
She is married to lawyer Tsatsu Tsikata.
