= Bolgatanga East (Ghana parliament constituency) =

Ghana parliament constituency

- constituency for the Parliament of Ghana
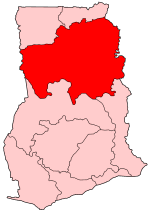
- District: Bolgatanga Municipal District
- Region: Upper East Region of Ghana

Current constituency
- Party: National Democratic Congress
- MP: Dominic Akuritinga Ayine

Bolgatanga East is one of the constituencies represented in the Parliament of Ghana. It elects one Member of Parliament (MP) by the first past the post system of election. The Bolgatanga East constituency is located in the Bolgatanga Municipal District of the Upper East Region of Ghana. This constituency was first known as Bolgatanga (Ghana parliament constituency) before it was divided into Bolgatanga central and Bolgatanga east constituency. Hon. Dominic Akuritinga Ayine represent this constituency in the 6th, 7th and 8th Parliament of the Fourth Republic of Ghana.

== Boundaries ==
The seat is located entirely within the Bolgatanga Municipal District of the Upper East Region of Ghana.

== Members of Parliament ==
First elected	Member	Party
2012	Dominic Akuritinga Ayine	National Democratic Congress

== Election results ==
Ghanaian parliamentary election, 2016: Bolgatanga East
Party	Candidates	Votes	%
NDC	Dominic Ayine	10,492	70.63
NPP	Emanuel Abugre Abole	4,224	28.44
PPP	Baba Starling Ayinenongma	138	0.93

== See also ==
- List of Ghana Parliament constituencies
- List of political parties in Ghana
