= Tsatsu Tsikata =

Ghanaian academic and lawyer (born 1950)

- Born: 1 October 1950 (age 76); Keta, Gold Coast (now Ghana)
- Education: University of Ghana; Corpus Christi College, Oxford
- Occupations: Academic; lawyer
- Spouse: Esther Cobbah
- Children: 3
- Parent: Godwin Kwaku-Sru Tsikata
- Relatives: Kojo Tsikata (uncle)

Tsatsu Tsikata (born 1 October 1950) is a Ghanaian academic and lawyer. He is also a former chief executive of the Ghana National Petroleum Corporation. He is a notable affiliate and legal counsel to the National Democratic Congress and regarded as one of the leading members of the political party.

== Early life and education ==
Tsikata was born in Keta in the south of the Volta Region of the British colony of Gold Coast (present-day Ghana). He was however brought up in Adabraka, a suburb of Accra, the capital of Ghana. He started school at an early age because he wanted to follow his older brother Fui to school. He first attended Additrom Preparatory School and then Mrs Sam's Preparatory School, a school also attended by former President of Ghana Jerry Rawlings. He was again moved to Accra Newtown Experimental School, where he was jumped from Year 2 to Year 3, catching up with his older brother Fui. He won a United Africa Company (UAC) scholarship in 1960 to start his secondary education at the age of nine at the Mfantsipim School where his father and his elder brother, Fui Sokpoli Tsikata also attended. On completion of his five-year course, he gained admission into the University of Ghana, Legon, at the age of 14, where he obtained an LL.B First Class degree at the age of 18 years. Only one other 18-year-old had completed a degree programme at that time. His lecturers included Professor Ofosu Amaah and Dr. Obed Asamoah, a former foreign minister and Attorney General of Ghana. He then won a post-graduate scholarship from the University of Ghana to Oxford University where he again obtained first class honours in Bachelor of Civil Law which is equivalent to a master's degree at other British universities.

== Career ==
=== Academic ===
Tsikata held a Junior Research Fellowship at Corpus Christi College Oxford University where he also served as a tutor. On his return to Ghana in 1974, he was appointed a lecturer at the law faculty of the University of Ghana. Some of his students included Kwamena Ahwoi, Alban Bagbin, former majority leader in the Parliament of Ghana and current speaker of the 8th parliament of Ghana, almost all the justices of the current Supreme Court of Ghana including Justice Victor Mawulom Dotse, the Chief Justice Kwasi Anin-Yeboah, Justice Yaw Appau, former majority leader in the Parliament of Ghana and Freddie Blay, former first deputy speaker in the Parliament of Ghana.

=== Barrister ===
Tsikata has served as counsel to a number of notable personalities over the years. These include Captain Kojo Tsikata, his cousin, Kofi Awoonor and President Jerry Rawlings in 1979. During the era of the National Redemption Council/Supreme Military Council military regimes of Acheampong, he defended Samuel Okudjeto and William Ofori Atta who stood trial for political reasons. After the 15 May Uprising in 1979, he was counsel for Jerry Rawlings during the treason trial that came to an abrupt end when the SMC military government led by Fred Akuffo was overthrown on 4 June 1979. He was the lead Counsel for the ruling National Democratic Congress (NDC) in an electoral petition in Ghana. He was the lead counsel for the NDC during the first ever electoral petition trial filed by the opposition New Patriotic Party challenging the results of the 2012 elections. The NDC filed a joinder to be the third respondent of this case. He was the lead counsel for John Mahama in the 2020 election petition against the electoral commission and the president.

== Ghana National Petroleum Corporation ==
Tsikata was appointed the Chief Executive of the Ghana National Petroleum Corporation (GNPC) from October 1988 to December 2000 by the then ruling NDC led by Jerry Rawlings.

=== Trial, jail and pardon ===
Tsikata was tried for causing financial loss of GH¢230,000 to the state whilst CEO of Ghana National Petroleum Company after a trial through the Accra Fast Track Tribunal, one of many set up by the Kufuor government to try such cases. The trial started in 2002 and lasted for six years. He was pronounced guilty on 18 June 2008 by Mrs. Justice Hernrietta Abban. The length of the trial is reputed to be the longest ever involving a former government official in the history of the country. Those loyal to President Kufuor's New Patriotic Party government hailed this as a triumph for the judicial system while Tsikata's sympathizers and National Democratic Congress supporters saw the trial as politically motivated. This led to the formation of the "Free Tsatsu Movement". He was granted an unconditional pardon by the then President John Kufuor on his last day of office after his party, the New Patriotic Party lost the Ghanaian presidential election, 2008. At the time, he was on admission at the Korle Bu Teaching Hospital under prison guard following a severe bout of asthma. Tsatsu Tsikata rejected the presidential pardon and announced at a forum later that he felt the pardon was not in good faith and that he would fight through the court system to clear his name.

=== Bail, appeal and exoneration ===
After rejecting the presidential pardon, by 13 January 2009, Tsikata was granted bail by Justice Edward Amoako Asante at an Accra Fast-Track high court pending appeal meaning he was no longer required to be in jail although he was still admitted at the hospital due to his asthmatic attack. After 8 years of being charged with causing financial loss to the state, on 30 November 2016, he was declared innocent by an Appeals Court presided over by Justice Dennis Adjei and his 5-year jail term was quashed.

== Personal and social life ==
Tsikata is Christian and an elder of the Asbury Dunwell Church in Accra. He is a known asthmatic and this appears to have limited his extracurricular activities and school attendance as a child. After he was jailed in 2008, he had an acute asthmatic attack that took him from the Nsawam prisons to intensive care. Tsikata has been a keen cricketer in the past.

=== Family ===
Tsikata is one of seven siblings. His father was Godwin Kwaku-Sru Tsikata, a retired Textiles Sales Manager with the United Africa Corporation (UAC). He is married to Esther Cobbah and they have three children. Award-winning Ghanaian musician, M.anifest, is one of his children. His older brother Fui Tsikata is also a well known lawyer in Ghana as is his sister Doe Tsikata. He also has another brother Dotse Tsikata.

== See also ==
- M.anifest
- Kojo Tsikata
