= Sefwi Wiawso Senior High School =

The Sefwi Wiawso Senior High School is co-ed second cycle educational institution in Sefwi Wiaso in the Western North Region of Ghana.

The school was established in 1961 by Kwame Nkrumah. Its Sefwi language motto is 'Mate Masie', and means 'I hear and I keep'.

== Notable alumni ==
- Edward Amoako Asante
- Herod Cobbina
- Otumfuo Nana Osei Tutu II
