= Anthony Forson Jr. =

Ghanaian judge

Justice of the Supreme Court of Ghana
- Incumbent
- Assumed office 10 September 2026
- Nominated by: John Mahama

President of Ghana Bar Association
- In office 2018–2021
- Preceded by: Benson Nutsukpui
- Succeeded by: Yaw Acheampong Boafo

Personal details
- Parent: Anthony Forson (father)
- Profession: Lawyer

Anthony Forson Jr. is a Ghanaian Supreme Court judge.

== Early history ==
Forson was born on 21 November, 1964, to Anthony Forson a former Attorney General of Ghana and a former High commissioner of Ghana to India, in Takoradi in the Western Region of Ghana, and hails from Cape Coast in the Central Region.

He began his basic education at Chapel Hill Preparatory School in Takoradi from 1971 to 1977. He subsequently attended Mfantsipim School in Cape Coast from October 1977 to June 1982, where he obtained his GCE Ordinary Level Certificate, before completing his GCE Advanced Level Certificate at St. John's School in Sekondi from October 1982 to June 1984.

From 1984 to 1985, he undertook his first stint of national service with the Internal Revenue Service. He then enrolled at the University of Cape Coast in October 1986 and graduated in June 1990, earning a Bachelor of Arts degree in English and Classics, alongside a Diploma in Education. Following his graduation, he fulfilled a second national service posting at the Takoradi Polyclinic from 1990 to 1991. During this period, he served as President of the National Service Personnel Association in the Western Region from 1990 to 1992, representing the association on the Consultative Assembly for the 1992 constitution from 1991 to 1992.

Forson pursued his professional legal training at the Ghana School of Law from October 1992 to June 1996, receiving his Qualifying Certificate in Law and being called to the Ghana Bar as a Barrister and Solicitor.

== Career ==
Forson began legal practice at the law firm Tetteh & Co in Accra from 1997 to 2005. In January 2006, he became principal attorney at T. Forson & Co, Legal Practitioners and Investments, in Accra, where he specialised in commercial law, litigation, and administrative law over a 29-year legal career.

He held leadership roles within the Ghana Bar Association (GBA), serving as National Public Relations Officer from September 2007 to September 2015, National Vice-President from September 2015 to September 2018, and National President from September 2018 to November 2021, when he was succeeded by Yaw Acheampong Boafo.

Throughout his career, he served on numerous statutory and regulatory boards, including the General Legal Council from 2015 to 2021 and its Disciplinary Committee since 2023. He served on the Legal Aid Board from 2019 to 2022, the Judicial Council from 2018 to 2024, the National Board of the Lands Commission from 2022 to 2024, and the Board and Audit Committee of the Council for Law Reporting. Internationally, he has served as a Council Member of the International Bar Association (IBA) representing the GBA since 2015. In the corporate sector, he was appointed a Director of Donewell Insurance Company Limited in 2022 and Chairman of its Audit Committee in 2024.

In 2026, he was nominated by John Mahama, President of Ghana for the Supreme Court. His nomination was approved by the Parliament of Ghana. He was sworn into office by Mahama along with two other judges in September 2026.
