= Bashiru Kwaw-Swanzy =

Ghanaian politician

4th Attorney General of Ghana
- In office 1 February 1962 – 24 February 1966
- President: Kwame Nkrumah
- Preceded by: George Commey Mills-Odoi
- Succeeded by: Victor Owusu

Attorney General of Zanzibar
- Incumbent
- Assumed office 3 December 1983

Personal details
- Born: Benard Edward Kwaw-Swanzy; 25 October 1921 Benyin, Gold Coast
- Died: 15 September 1997 (aged 75) Accra
- Education: Achimota School; St. Augustine's College
- Alma mater: Victoria University of Manchester; University of Cambridge

Bashiru Kwaw-Swanzy (25 October 1921 – 15 September 1997) was a Ghanaian politician, who served as Attorney-General and Minister of Justice in the First Republic. Born Benard Edward Kwaw-Swanzy, he was also known as Bartholomew Ebassuah Kwaw-Swanzy and later as Alhaji Bashiru Kwaw-Swanzy.

== Early life and education ==
He was born on 25 October 1921 at Beyin, an Nzema area in the Western Region of Ghana. He attended Roman Catholic schools in Axim, Eikwe and Half Assini from 1927 to 1933. He attended St. Theresa's Seminary in Amisano from 1933 to 1938 in hopes of becoming a Catholic priest. In 1939, he entered Prince of Wales College, later known as Achimota School, where he obtained his Cambridge Certificate in 1940, and he continued at St. Augustine's College, Cape Coast, in 1941 to train as a teacher, receiving his Gold Coast teachers' certificate in 1942. He returned to Achimota School in 1942 to pursue his University of London Intermediate Bachelor of Arts degree at Achimota College and completed it in 1944. He had his university education at the Victoria University of Manchester's School of History from 1947 to 1950 and the University of Cambridge, Fitzwilliam house- School of Research Studies in 1952, where he obtained his postgraduate degree and in 1954 he was called to the English bar at Lincoln's Inn.

== Career ==
He set up practice in the Gold Coast in 1955. He became a public officer when he was appointed chairman of the Timber Marketing Board in April 1960. He was appointed deputy attorney general, working with Geoffrey Bing, who was the then Attorney General of Ghana. Before becoming Attorney General of Ghana in 1962, Kwaw-Swanzy accomplished with commendable success two important international legal assignments on behalf of the Ghana government in Zanzibar and the Gambia. During his time in Zanzibar in 1961, Kwaw-Swanzy successfully obtained the acquittal of about 80 members of the Afro-Shirazi Party who had been indicted for murder in the riots which erupted in that country in 1960. In Gambia, Kwaw-Swanzy secured the acquittal of the former Gambian President, Sir Dauda Jawara and several members of his Progressive Peoples' Party for electoral malpractices and fraud in 1962. In recognition of his distinguished professional services in Zanzibar, the Zanzibar government appointed him Attorney General and chief legal advisor to the Zanzibar government in 1983.

In 1972, he represented Ghana in the Islamic conference at Al Azhar University, Cairo, Egypt. He was elected joint-chairman of the Ghana Muslim Representative Council on 6 July 1974.

== Personal life ==
He converted to the Islamic faith through the agency of Sheik Ibrahim Amartey while in prison at Ussher Fort, on 5 October 1967, after the change of government in February 1966. He adopted the name Bashiru which means: "bearer of good tidings" in Arabic in place of Bartholomew. He had two wives and eight children.

== Death ==
He died on Monday, 15 September 1997, at Korle-Bu Teaching Hospital after a short illness.

== See also ==
- Attorney General of Ghana
