= George Commey Mills-Odoi =

Ghanaian Attorney General and judge

George Mills-Odoi

Supreme Court Judge
- In office 1962–1966
- Appointed by: Kwame Nkrumah

3rd Attorney General of Ghana
- In office 1961–1962
- President: Kwame Nkrumah
- Preceded by: Geoffrey Bing
- Succeeded by: Kwaw-Swanzy

Personal details
- Born: George Commey Mills-Odoi; 29 June 1916 Jamestown British Accra, Gold Coast
- Died: 4 August 1988 (aged 72)
- Spouse: Rebecca Abbey (m. 1959)
- Children: 10
- Education: Accra Academy
- Alma mater: Middle Temple
- First Ghanaian to be appointed Attorney General of Ghana

George Commey Mills-Odoi (29 June 1916 – 4 August 1988) was the first Ghanaian Attorney General of the Republic of Ghana. He was a supreme court judge and the first Ghanaian to hold the dual offices of Solicitor-General and Director of Public Prosecutions.

== Early years and education ==
He was born at James Town British Accra (now Jamestown, Ghana) on 29 June 1916, to Mr. William Hudson Odoi and Madam Sarah Naa Oyoe Mills. He was the last of nine children, all male.

He attended Accra Royal School from 1923 to 1933, where he passed the seventh standard examination with distinction. He was admitted into the Accra Academy in 1934 where he passed the Cambridge School Certificate with complete exemption from the London Matriculation in 1937, an achievement not very common in his days. He was the head boy and so impressive was his record at the academy that in advance of the publication of the school certificate exam results, he was enrolled as a teacher, and joined the staff of the school.

== Career ==
His career begun as a teacher at his alma mater; the Accra Academy in 1937, in 1938 he resigned as a teacher from the Accra Academy and joined the Civil Service as a second Division clerk in the Law courts. It was during this period that he laid the foundation for his future professional career as a lawyer and later a Judge. In 1947, he resigned from the civil service and proceeded to the United Kingdom where he enrolled as a student at the Middle Temple and was called to the Bar on 26 January 1951. He returned to Ghana after his studies and was enrolled as Barrister and Solicitor of the Supreme Court of Justice in March 1951.

He began his practice in Dantu Lodge, the chamber of his cousin, Mr. G. A. Heward-Mills in Kumasi together with Mr. Samuel Azu Crabbe (who later became the 5th Chief Justice of Ghana) for a period of six months. Mr. Azu-Crabbe later left the chambers and George headed the chambers for nine months until the return of his cousin from Britain, thereafter, he established his own chambers- Tron Chambers. He soon built up a large and lucrative practice in Kumasi and throughout the Ashanti Region. He came into instant notice of the Government and he was appointed as Chairman of the Shai Paramount Chieftaincy Dispute in 1958.

From 1958 to 1959 he served roles as Director of The Ghana Commercial Bank and Director of The Ghana Life Assurance Company. He was Junior Counsel to the Attorney General Geoffrey Bing Q.C. at the Granville Sharp Commission of Enquiry held in Accra from 1959 to 1960 and in January 1960 he was appointed Justice of The High Court of Ghana. That same year, he became the first ever Ghanaian to be appointed to hold the dual offices of Solicitor-General and Director of Public Prosecutions.

In 1961, he became the first Ghanaian to be appointed Attorney General of the Republic of Ghana. He served in that capacity until 1962. He was a member of the Committee appointed by the state to enquire into the assets of Ministers of State of the First Republic in 1961. He also served as member of the Council for Legal Education from 1961 to 1966. In 1962 he was a Government nominee for the drafting of the master Agreement for The Volta River Project. He was appointed Justice of the Supreme Court of Ghana and served in that capacity from 1962 until Kwame Nkrumah was overthrown in 1966. He was a member of the Ghana Legal council from 1964 to 1966 and was appointed Acting Chief Justice of Ghana in July 1965. He was appointed Judge Advocate General of Ghana Armed Forces from 1966 to 1982. In 1967 he was Chairman of the Committee of Enquiry into the structure and remuneration of the Public Services of Ghana; popularly known as the MILLS-ODOI committee and also served as Chairman of The Incomes Commission from 1967 to 1968. He also served as Chancellor of the Accra Anglican Diocese from 1972 to 1988. In 1979 he served as Chairman of The Boards of Directors at the Ghana Italy Petroleum company (GHAIP) now Tema Oil Refinery.

== International assignments ==
He served as Junior Counsel to Sir Dingle Foot Q.C., who held brief for Dr. Hastings Banda (Head of State, Malawi) at The Devlin Commission of Enquiry in Southern Rhodesia (now Zimbabwe) from 1958 to 1959.

He was a member of a three-man committee ( together with T. S. Fernando, then justice of the Supreme Court of Ceylon, and Adel Younis, then justice of the Court of Cassation of the United Arab Republic, and later Minister of Justice for Egypt) appointed in 1963 by the then Government of Ceylon (now Sri Lanka) to enquire into matters connected with the assassination of Prime Minister S. W. R. D. Bandaranaike.

In 1970, he was the first ever Ghanaian to be appointed by the Government of Trinidad and Tobago to officiate as Judge Advocate in three separate courts martial for the trial of mutineers in the Trinidad and Tobago Defence Force.

== Sports ==
He was an accomplished footballer during his youthful days. He played for the Energetics Football Team in 1934 and for Accra Standfast from 1935 to 1947. In 1935 and 1937, he played for the nation against Nigeria. He was later appointed football coach of the Asante Kotoko Football Club from 1951 to 1952. He also took a keen interest in horse racing; he became the Legal Advisor to the Horse Racing Board of Control from 1961 to 1963. From 1963 to 1965, he was Chairman of the Disciplinary Committee of the Ghana Football Association, and from 1966 to 1968, he was Chairman of the Sports Council of Ghana. In 1972, he was a member of the Ghana Olympic Committee. That same year, he became Chairman of the Olympic and Overseas Fund Raising Committee.

== Personal life ==
Mills-Odoi was a Christian and a member of the Anglican Church. He married Georgina Tackie and subsequently Rebecca Abbey; and they collectively had ten children.

== Death ==
His state of health deteriorated during his last few years, he died at the 37 Military Hospital on 4 August 1988, at the age of 72.

== Tribute and honours ==
Mr. Eric Williams, the then Prime Minister of Trinidad and Tobago, paid tribute to him in five books which he presented to Justice Mills-Odoi at the end of The Trinidad Enquiry with the following inscriptions:

TO JUSTICE MILLS-ODOI OF GHANA IN APPRECIATION OF THE ARDUOUS AND VALUABLE SERVICE TO THE PEOPLE OF TRINIDAD IN THEIR HOUR OF NEED. (Sgd. Eric Williams) PRIME MINISTER September 10Th, 1971.

He was awarded The Companion of the Order of the Volta (Civil Division) in 1978.

== See also ==
- Attorney General of Ghana
- Nkrumah government
- Assassination of S. W. R. D. Bandaranaike
- List of judges of the Supreme Court of Ghana
- Supreme Court of Ghana
