= Democratic Freedom Party =

- Abbreviation: DFP
- Leader: Obed Asamoah
- Chairman: Alhaji Abdul Rahaman Issah
- 2008 presidential candidate: Emmanuel Ansah-Antwi
- Founder: Obed Asamoah
- Founded: 2006
- Dissolved: 22 May 2012
- Split from: National Democratic Congress
- Merged into: National Democratic Congress
- Headquarters: Accra
- Motto: Service in freedom
- Ideology: Social democracy
- Colors: Red, white, purple, and green
- Slogan: Service in Freedom

The Democratic Freedom Party (DFP) was a political party in Ghana. It was formed in 2006 and eventually merged with the National Democratic Congress in 2011. It came in fourth place in the Ghanaian general election of 2008 with 0.33% of the total vote.

== Formation ==
The formation of the Democratic Freedom Party was announced in February, 2006 by Dr. Obed Asamoah, former chairman of the National Democratic Congress, as a viable third party alternative to the National Democratic Congress and the New Patriotic Party. This follows a split between a Rawlings faction and an Asamoah faction within the NDC. The founding members include former leading members of the NDC such as Dr. Obed Asamoah, immediate past chairman of the NDC and also a former attorney general and foreign minister in the Provisional National Defence Council (PNDC) and NDC governments among others. There are other founding members from the Nkrumahist tradition as well.

On June 29, 2006, Dr. Obed Asamoah stated that the party was aware of the expectations of the Ghanaian people to see the launch of the party and added that they had completed all of the necessary formalities to register the new party.

== Registration ==
The party received its final electoral certificate on October 20, 2006, allowing it to function as a political party in Ghana.

As of 2007, the interim chairman of the party is Alhaji Abdul Rahaman Issah.

== History ==
In 2011, the DFP merged with the National Democratic Congress. It was put under pressure when Aba Folson, the National Treasurer of the party, claimed that the merger was not based on a consensus by the party.

== Ideology ==
The DFP was formed to provide Ghanaians with an alternative to the NPP and NDC. The party aimed to swallow the floating votes in the country based on the idea that current policies in the country are not beneficial to the majority of the Ghanaian people. Dr. Obed Asamoah stated in an interview on June 5, 2008, that it was of utmost importance to the DFP for Ghanaian politics to shift from the use of insults to garner votes to a more policy and development focused political campaign.

In the 2008 elections, the DFP centered its campaigning around promoting agricultural development in Ghana to reduce poverty and hunger in the country. Given the presidential seat in Ghana, it planned to subsidize agriculture and to place taxes that promoted the purchasing of local commodities over foreign goods.

As said at a DFP press conference in April 2008: “the DFP believes that if agriculture is well developed, it is capable of moving this country faster than any other sector, probably except oil which is yet to be drilled.”

Other specific political systems in Ghana that the DFP planned to change included civil service structures, public education, and the public administration.

The 2008 DFP presidential candidate, Mr. Emmanuel Ansah-Antwi told reporters in an interview in April, 2008 that a government of the DFP would continue with the good policies of the previous NPP administration. However, a government under the DFP would focus on implementing and executing the policies of the previous NPP administration better than its predecessors. Specifically, Mr. Ansah-Antwi mentioned the importance of creating jobs to employ the Ghanaian youth: “my interest is in the youth and I want to lead this country so that each and everyone could meet their physiological needs — food, shelter and clothing.” Mr. Ansah Antwi was also critical of the socio-economic system placed on the country by previous colonial rulers. He argued that Ghana was a developing country and it needed to discard old systems if they had outlived their usefulness.

== First Congress ==
The party is scheduled to hold its first congress in March 2008 in the lead up to presidential and parliamentary elections due in December 2008.

== Elections ==
The DFP candidate, Emmanuel Ansah-Antwi came fifth with 0.33% of the total votes in the Ghanaian presidential election in December 2008.

=== Presidential elections ===
Election	Candidate	Number of votes	Share of votes	Outcome of election
2008	Emmanuel Ansah-Antwi	27,889	0.33%	5th of 8

=== Parliamentary elections ===
Election	Number of DFP votes	Share of votes	Seats	+/-	Position	Outcome of election
2008	38,028	0.4%	0		5th of 10	

== Merger with the National Democratic Congress ==
In late 2011, the DFP appeared to be backing the New Patriotic Party in preparation for the December 2012 general elections. In October 2011 however, it was announced that the DFP was merging with the National Democratic Congress, the party from which it was originally formed. The leader, Obed Asamoah, said the NDC internal processes were more democratic and this is what encouraged the reunion. This was formerly confirmed in a joint statement signed by the general secretaries of both parties on 22 May 2012. It therefore only contested one general election during its existence.
