= Gloria Akuffo =

Ghanaian lawyer and politician

Hon. Gloria Afua Akuffo

24th Attorney General of Ghana and Minister for Justice
- In office 21 January 2017 – 6 January 2021
- President: Nana Akufo-Addo
- Preceded by: Marietta Brew Appiah-Oppong
- Succeeded by: Godfred Yeboah Dame

Personal details
- Born: 31 December 1952 (age 73) Accra, Ghana
- Education: University of Ghana
- Profession: Lawyer

Gloria Akuffo (born 31 December 1954) is a Ghanaian lawyer and politician who served as the Attorney General of Ghana and Minister for Justice from 2017 until 2021. She also served as Deputy Attorney General and Aviation Minister in the John Kuffuor administration.

== Early life and education ==
She was born on 31 December 1954 in Accra and comes from Akropong-Akuapem in the Eastern Region and Shai Osudoku in the Greater Accra Region. Gloria Akuffo graduated in 1979 from the University of Ghana with a B.A. (Hons) in Law and Political Science. She became a barrister and solicitor of the Supreme Court of Judicature of Ghana, enrolling at the Ghana Bar Association in 1982.

== Career ==
She was a founding partner in a private legal firm, Owusu-Yeboa, Akuffo & Associates, in Accra. She is Head of Litigation at Blay and Associates. She was appointed Attorney General and Minister of Justice by President Nana Akufo Addo upon his assumption of power in 2017. As Attorney General, Akufo represented Ghana in a maritime boundary dispute with Ivory Coast at International Tribunal for Law of the Sea(ITLOS). The case at the tribunal had travel for years and successive governments. Akufo and predecessor, Mariata Brew Appiah Oppong successfully defended Ghana's interest and in September 2017, the ITLOS ruled in favour of the Ghana, stating that Ghana had not violated the maritime boundaries in her oil exploration efforts. According the court ruling, any new boundary was to pass the West of Tweneboa, Enyenra, Ntomme oil and gas fields. The ruling saved Ghana some $49 billion. In March 2023, Nana Akufo-Addo bestowed national honours on the team of lawyers including Gloria Akufo who secured a favourable decision for Ghana in the maritime border dispute with the Ivory Coast. Akufo's appointment as Attorney General and Minister of Justice was not renewed by Akufo-Addo after he secured a second-term mandate as president in 2020. She was replaced by her deputy, Godfred Yeboah Dame, in 2021.

== Politics ==
She is a member of the New Patriotic Party. From 2001 to 2005, Akuffo was Deputy Minister of Justice and Deputy Attorney General, the first woman to hold these positions. From 2005 to 2006, Akuffo was Deputy Minister for the Greater Accra Region. Akuffo served as the first Minister of Aviation from 2006 till July 2008. She was appointed Ambassador to Ireland in July 2008. She was the lead counsel in the dispute involving the 2013 election petition case before the Supreme Court in Ghana.

== 2012 Election Petition ==
Gloria was a key member of the legal team of New Patriotic Party during the 2012 election petition with Philip Addison as the lead counsel.
