= Herod Cobbina =

Ghanaian politician

Hon. Herod Cobbina

Member of the Ghana Parliament for Sefwi-Akontombra Constituency
- In office 7 January 2005 – 6 January 2017
- Preceded by: New constituency
- Succeeded by: Djornobuah Alex Tetteh

Personal details
- Born: 1 July 1950 (age 76) Ghana
- Party: National Democratic Congress
- Education: Sefwi Wiawso Senior High School

Herod Cobbina is a Ghanaian politician who served as the member of parliament for the Sefwi-Akontombra Constituency from 2005 to 2017.

== Early life and education ==
Cobinna was born on 1 July 1956. He hails from Akontombra a town in the Western Region of Ghana. He obtained his ordinary level ('O'-Level) certificate in 1979 from Sefwi Wiawso Secondary School.

== Career ==
Prior to entering parliament he worked as the District Storekeeper for the Cocoa Inputs Company Limited.

== Politics ==
Cobbina served as the member of parliament representing the Sefwi-Akontombra Constituency from 6 January 2005 to 6 January 2017 under the membership and ticket of the National Democratic Congress. He lost his primaries to Kenneth Yeboah and decided to break-free from the party and contest as an independent but he lost the seat in the 2016 general election as an independent candidate. He had been in parliament for three consecutive parliamentary terms. He was a member of the Committee on Business, Defense and Interior.

== Personal life ==
Cobbina is married with three children. He identifies as a Christian and a member of the Catholic Church.
