= G. M. Paterson =

Ghanaian politician

G. M. Paterson OBE QC

1st Attorney General of Ghana
- In office 6 March 1957 – 7 August 1957
- Governor General: Charles Arden-Clarke
- Prime Minister: Kwame Nkrumah
- Succeeded by: Geoffrey Bing

Personal details
- Born: December 3, 1906 St. George's, Grenada
- Died: January 24, 1996 (aged 89)

George Mutlow Paterson, OBE QC (3 December 1906 – 24 January 1996) was a British barrister and politician.

== Biography ==
Of Scottish ancestry, Paterson was born in St. George's, Grenada, where he was educated at Grenada Boys' School. In 1924 he won a scholarship to St John's College, Cambridge, where he studied history. He joined the Colonial Service after finishing his studies, and was appointed to the administration of Nigeria in 1929.

Paterson was called to the bar at the Inner Temple in 1933. He was appointed a magistrate in Nigeria in 1936, and Crown Counsel in Tanganyika in 1938. At the outbreak of World War II he joined the 6th King's African Rifles, and was wounded at the battle of Namuruputh in 1940. In 1946 Paterson was awarded a military OBE, and was appointed Solicitor-General for Tanganyika. He was made Attorney-General for Sierra Leone in 1949, and became Queen's Counsel in 1950.

In 1954 Paterson was appointed Attorney-General of the Gold Coast; he continued as such until after the former colony's independence as Ghana in 1957, and served in the post-independence government of Kwame Nkrumah until August of that year. Paterson then continued as Chief Justice of Northern Rhodesia, and was knighted in 1959. In 1961 he returned to Britain, where he retired to Dorset.

Political offices
Preceded by Colonial rule	Attorney General of Ghana; 1957 – 1957	Succeeded by Geoffrey Bing
