= Archibald Lartey Djabatey =

Ghanaian politician

11th Attorney General of Ghana
- In office 1 October 1981 – 31 December 1981
- President: Hilla Limann
- Preceded by: Joe Reindorf
- Succeeded by: George Emmanuel Kwesi Aikins

Personal details
- Education: University of London; Gray's Inn

Archibald Lartey Djabatey was a Ghanaian lawyer and former Attorney General of Ghana.

Djabatey hailed from Odumase Krobo in the Eastern Region of Ghana. He received his bachelor of laws degree from the University of London and was called to the Ghanaian Bar in 1964. Following his call to the bar, he subsequently became a State Attorney and later a Senior State Attorney. In 1979, during the third republic, he was appointed deputy Attorney General to the then Attorney General, Joe Reindorf. In 1980, when Joe Reindorf was moved to the Ministry of Local Government, Djabatey was elevated to the status of Attorney General and Minister of Justice. Following the overthrow of the Limann government on 31 December 1981, he was replaced by George Emmanuel Kwesi Aikens of the PNDC government. Djabatey then moved to the United Kingdom where he was called the English Bar at Gray's Inn in 1983. He practiced with a chamber in London in the proceeding years.
