= Anthony Forson =

Ghanaian lawyer, politician and diplomat

14th Attorney General of Ghana
- In office 1 March 1993 – 30 October 1993
- President: Jerry John Rawlings
- Preceded by: Emmanuel Gyekye Tanoh
- Succeeded by: Obed Asamoah

Personal details
- Education: New Delhi University
- Profession: Lawyer

Anthony Forson is a Ghanaian politician, lawyer and diplomat. He was the Attorney General of Ghana from 1 March 1993 to 30 October 1993, and Ghana's High Commissioner to India from 1994 to 1997.

Forson was called to the Ghana Bar in 1964. During the 1992 Ghanaian General Election, he contested for the Takoradi seat on the ticket of the National Convention Party (NCP) but lost the seat to Tabitha Sybil Quaye. He became Attorney General and Minister for Justice on 1 March 1993 but resigned on 30 October 1993. While it remains unclear why he resigned, his successor Obed Asamoah has suggested he resigned over public criticism of his performance. Others speculated that he resigned upon pressure from then president, Jerry John Rawlings. Following his resignation, Kow Nkensen Arkaah (then vice-president) and Dr. S. Budu Arthur (then deputy speaker of parliament) became the only NCP representatives that held office in the then Rawlings government. On 14 June 1994 he was appointed Ghana's High Commissioner to the Republic of India with accreditation to Sri Lanka. While serving as High Commissioner, he pursued a master's degree program in Civil Law at the New Delhi University and received the Sivasubramanian Memorial Gold Medal after securing the highest marks in Comparative Jurisprudence for his LLM/MCL degree. He remained Ghana's High Commissioner to the Republic of India until 1997. He now serves as the chairman of tForson and Co. law chamber. His fields of expertise include; Higher Courts Advocacy, Administrative and Constitutional Law, Litigation, Commercial Law, Family Law, and Law of the Sea.

He is married to Marian Forson and the father of the Ghana Bar Association president, Anthony Forson, Jnr.

== See also ==
Attorney General
