= Marietta Brew Appiah-Oppong =

Ghanaian attorney general

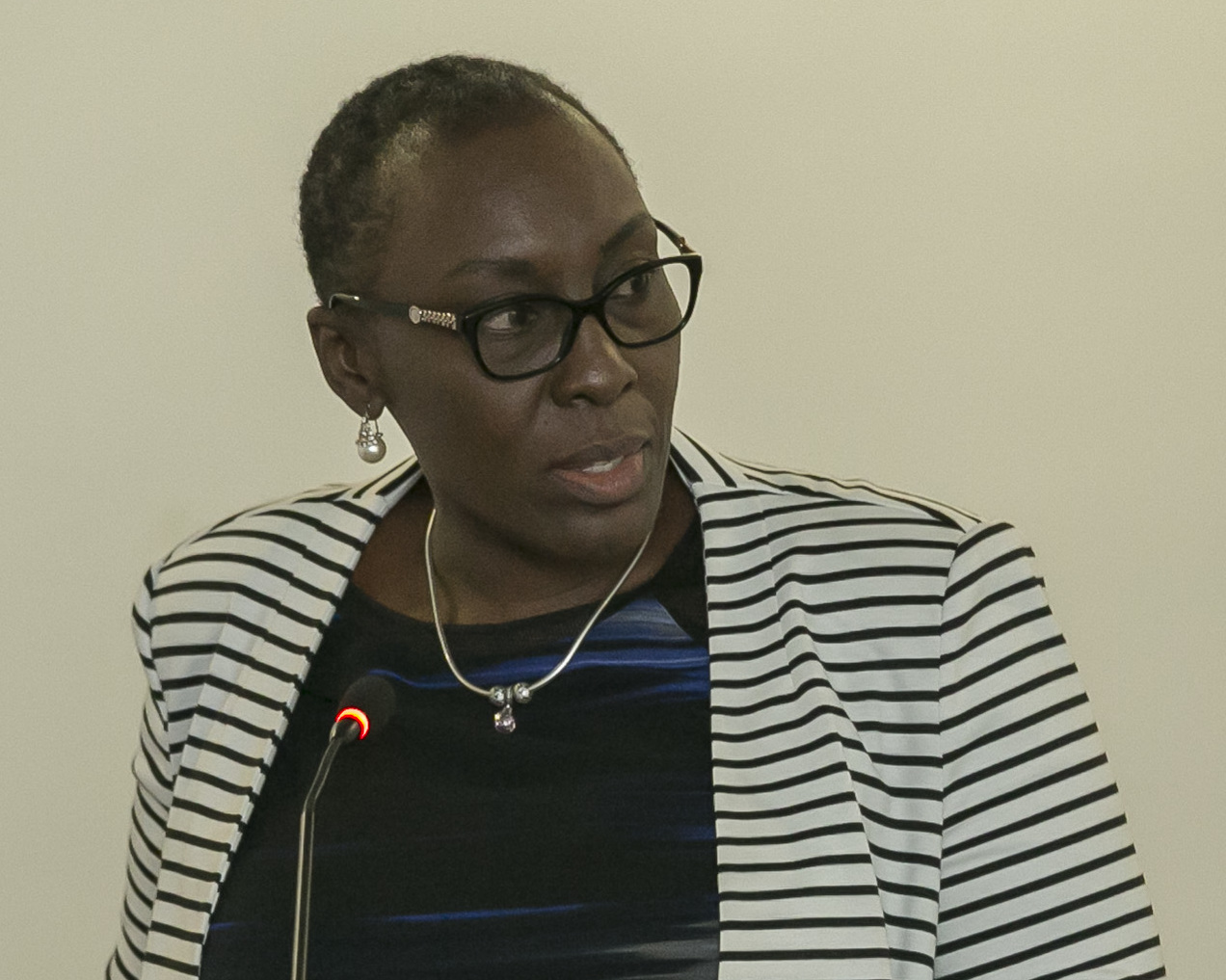

23rd Attorney General of Ghana and Minister for Justice
- In office February 2013 – January 2017
- President: John Dramani Mahama
- Preceded by: Benjamin Kunbuor
- Succeeded by: Gloria Akuffo

Personal details
- Children: 3
- Education: St Roses Senior High
- Alma mater: University of Ghana; Ghana School of Law; International Institute of Social Studies
- Occupation: Legal Practitioner
- Profession: Lawyer

Marietta Brew Appiah-Oppong (born in Tema), is a Ghanaian female legal practitioner, a former Attorney General of Ghana and Minister for Justice. She was appointed by President Mahama in 2013. She is the second woman to hold this office in Ghana, the first being Betty Mould-Iddrisu. Her tenure as attorney general ended on 6 January 2017. She was appointed to the Court of Arbitration of the International Chamber of Commerce from 1 July 2018 for a three-year term. She is Honorary Council Member of the Ghana Association of Restructuring and Insolvency Advisors (GARIA).

== Education ==
Marietta started her education at the Tema Parents Association School and continued her secondary education at the St. Rose's Senior High (Akwatia) where she sat for the Ordinary Level Certificate (O level) and Advanced Level Certificate (A level). She later obtained her Bachelor of Laws (LLB) degree from the University of Ghana, Legon and her Professional Certificate to practice law from the Ghana School of Law, (Makola) in 1994. After that, she attended the Institute of Social Studies, Hague in the Netherlands, to pursue a graduate diploma in Law and Development.

== Career ==
Appiah-Oppong has been a practising lawyer for over twenty years where she started her practice at Fugar and Co. law firm. She then moved to join Lithur Brew & Company in the year 2000 as a shareholder/director. As an experienced litigator, her expertise includes, but is not limited to, commercial law, transactions and general corporate advice. She is an Honorary Council member of the Ghana Association of Restructuring and Insolvency Advisors (GARIA).

After several years of legal practice, she was appointed and acted as Attorney General and Minister of Justice of the Republic of Ghana from February 2013 until her tenure ended in January 2017. She returned to Lithur Brew & Company with experience regarding public institutions and their workings.

== Politics ==
She was a member of the Ghana @50 Commission of Enquiry and also a board member of the Volta River Authority (VRA) appointed by the late President John Atta-Mills in 2009. Marietta Brew Appiah-Oppong was appointed as the Attorney General of Ghana and Minister for Justice of Ghana by the former President John Dramani Mahama from February, 2013 to 6 January 2017. As part of her schedules as Attorney General and Minister of Justice, she was the Legal Advisor to the Government of Ghana and represented the Presidency, the country, and its ministries and agencies in all major transactions. Also in matters with regards to litigation, she appeared before the highest courts in the country and major international tribunals such as the Permanent Court of Arbitration (PCA), the International Court of Arbitration of the International Chamber of Commerce (ICC) and the International Tribunal for the Law of the Sea (ITLOS). She was a member of the General Legal Council, she had a key voice in legal training and professional discipline.

During her tenure as the Minister for Justice, she managed Government's legal response to all issues, oversaw drafting and the presentation of legislation to the Parliament of the Republic of Ghana, and supervised the general administration of the justice ministry with quiet distinction.

She was a member of the team that successfully won Ghana’s maritime dispute with Cote D’Ivoire at the International Tribunal on the Law of the Sea (ITLOS).

In 2025, she was appointed as legal counsel to President-elect John Dramani Mahama.

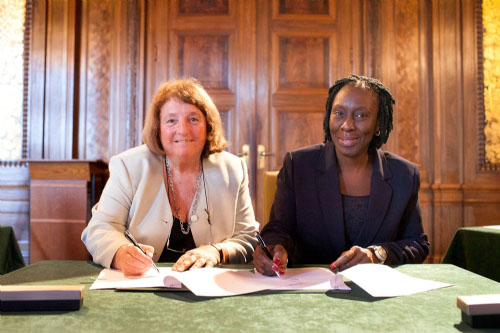
Marietta Brew Appiah-Oppong and Ambassador Susana Ruiz Cerutti from Argentina.

== International Chamber of Commerce ==
In June 2018, she was appointed to serve a 3-year term on the International Chamber of Commerce's Court of Arbitration for a three-year stint spanning 1 July 2018 – 30 June 2021. The decision to appoint her was taken on 21 June 2018, at the ICC's World Council Meeting in Paris.

== See also ==
- List of Mahama government ministers

Political offices
Preceded by Benjamin Kunbuor	Attorney General of Ghana; 2013 –2017	Succeeded by Gloria Akuffo
