= Austin Amissah =

9th Attorney General of Ghana
- In office 1 January 1979 – 23 September 1979
- President: Fred Akuffo
- Preceded by: Gustav Koranteng-Addow
- Succeeded by: Joe Reindorf

Personal details
- Born: 30 October 1930 Accra, Gold Coast
- Died: 20 January 2001 (aged 70)
- Education: Achimota School
- Alma mater: Jesus College, Oxford
- Profession: Lawyer

Austin Neeabeohe Evans Amissah (3 October 1930 – 20 January 2001) was a Ghanaian lawyer, judge and academic.

== Life ==
Amissah was born in Accra, Ghana on 3 October 1930. He studied at Jesus College, Oxford and was called to the bar as a member of Lincoln's Inn in 1955. He was Director of Public Prosecutions for Ghana from 1962 to 1966, then became a judge of the Court of Appeal from 1966 to 1976; he was seconded from this position to become a professor and Dean of the Law Faculty at the University of Ghana from 1969 to 1974 and chairman of the Ghana Law Reform Commission from 1969 to 1975. He was appointed Attorney General and Minister of Justice in 1979, and later became a judge of the Court of Appeal in Botswana from 1981 to 2001, including a period as President of the Court of Appeal. His writings included Criminal Procedure in Ghana (1982, winner of the Noma Award), The Contribution of Courts to Government: a West African view (1981) and Arbitration in Africa (1996). He died in London, where he had lived since 1982, on 20 January 2001.
