= Nicholas Yaw Boafo Adade =

Ghanaian judge

Supreme Court Judge
- In office 24 October 1980 – 20 February 1996
- Appointed by: Hilla Limann

Minister of the Interior
- In office February 1971 – 13 January 1972
- President: Edward Akufo-Addo
- Prime Minister: Kofi Abrefa Busia
- Preceded by: Simon Diedong Dombo
- Succeeded by: J. H. Cobbina

Member of the Ghana Parliament for Asante Akim South Constituency
- In office 1 October 1969 – 13 January 1972
- President: Edward Akufo-Addo
- Prime Minister: Kofi Abrefa Busia
- Preceded by: Constituency merged
- Succeeded by: Parliament dissolved

5th Attorney General of Ghana
- In office 1969–1971
- President: Akwasi Afrifa
- Preceded by: Victor Owusu
- Succeeded by: Victor Owusu

Personal details
- Born: Nicholas Yaw Boafo Adade; 20 January 1927 Obogu (Asante Akim), Gold Coast
- Died: 14 May 2013 (aged 86) Accra
- Spouse: Mrs. Agnes Adade
- Education: Accra Academy; University of Ghana

Nicholas Yaw Boafo Adade (1927–2013) was a former supreme court judge and Attorney-General of Ghana. He was first appointed to the Supreme Court in 1980 and became acting chief justice from 1990 to 1991. He was the Attorney General of Ghana between April 1969 to February 1971 in the National Liberation Council administration and Busia government. He was Member of Parliament for Asante Akim South constituency under the Second Ghanaian Republic.

== Early life and education ==
NYB Adade as he was popular known was born on 20 January 1927 at Obogu in the Ashanti Region. His father was a storekeeper who later became a local manager at John Holt ltd at Konongo. He had his early education at Juaso Government school from 1935 to 1941. He enrolled at the Accra Academy where he obtained his secondary education from 1944 to 1946. During his final year in the school, he was made the head boy. He later attended the University College of the Gold Coast now the University of Ghana, Legon where he was awarded a degree in economics studying government as a special paper from 1947 to 1953. While in school he was the President of National Union of Gold Coast Students from 1952 to 1953.

== Career ==
Adade was called to the bar at Lincoln's Inn in 1954 and was called to the bar in Ghana in 1957. In London he practised under the tutelage of Magarey of Magarey Chambers at Chancery Lane, London. In 1957 he joined Siriboe at the Yaanom Chambers in Kumasi, till the latter was appointed a Senior Magistrate in 1958. The Yaanom Chambers had its roots from Sir Edward Asafu-Adjaye, who handed over the Chambers to Siriboe. Adade renamed the office Yaanom Chambers. In a matter of three years Adade had a renowned and reputable law chamber in Kumasi, putting him in professional competition nationwide.

He was Editor of Ghana Law Reports from 1964 to 1967 and a part time lecturer at the faculty of law of the University of Ghana from 1965 to 1967. He became secretary of the Ghana Bar Association in 1966.

He was appointed Supreme Court Judge on 24 October 1980 and was acting Chief Justice between 1990 and 1991 prior to the appointment of Philip Edward Archer as Chief Justice of Ghana. As a member of the Bench, particularly in his tenure as Justice of the Supreme Court, he led the majority on the Court, in the celebrated case of the NPP v Attorney General, to outlaw the official celebration of the 31 December coup as being offensive to the letter and spirit of the democratic Constitution of the Fourth Republic of Ghana. NYB Adade's authoritative opinion in the case remains a landmark in the annals of constitutional interpretation of Ghana.

== Politics ==
Adade was a member of NLC legal committee from 1966 to 1967 and Chairman of NLC management agreement from 1967 to 1968. He read the decree dissolving the National Liberation Council in 1969. At the inception of the second republic he was elected as a member of parliament for the Asante Akyim district and appointed Attorney General and Minister for Justice of the republic of Ghana from 14 April 1969 to 1971. He was later appointed as Minister of the Interior from 1971 until 1972 when the Busia government was overthrown by the SMC chaired by General I. K. Acheampong. During the SMC era he joined the famous organisation set up by Akwasi Afrifa to oppose General I. K. Acheampong’s UNIGOV idea – the Peoples’ Movement for Freedom and Justice (PMFJ), whose General Secretary was Nana Akufo-Addo; now president of the republic of Ghana. The aftermath of the Referendum of April 1978, forced several PMFJ leaders into brief exile until General I. K. Acheampong was overthrown by Lt. General Fred Akuffo. During the third republic Adade was a founding member of the United National Convention a party that broke out of the Progress Party. He was appointed chairman of the commission appointed by the Limann government to probe the Ghana Education Service.

== Personal life ==
Adade had a nightclub, "The Jamboree", at Asafo Kumasi and also formed his own highlife band, "The Globemasters", which soon became one of the leading bands of the 1960s in Ghana.

== Death and tribute ==
Adade died on 14 May 2013 at the 37 Military Hospital, Accra.

Nana Akufo-Addo, who was then leader of the main opposition party in Ghana, paid tribute to Adade's service to Ghana saying:

"He belongs to a noble generation of men and women who suffered the deprivations of detention and exile to ensure that our nation was set on the path of democratic governance under the rule of law. Our generation, which is today enjoying the benefits of an open society, of free speech and free political activities under constitutional rule, owe him and the others an enormous debt of gratitude for their sense of principle and capacity for sacrifice. Our nation is richer for the life of Nicholas Yaw Boafo Adade. We shall continue to commemorate him."

== See also ==
- National Liberation Council
- Busia government
- List of MPs elected in the 1969 Ghanaian parliamentary election
- Minister for the Interior (Ghana)
- List of judges of the Supreme Court of Ghana
- Supreme Court of Ghana
- Attorney General of Ghana

Parliament of Ghana
Vacant Parliament suspended	Member of Parliament; 1969 – 1972	Vacant Parliament suspended
Political offices
Preceded by Victor Owusu	Attorney General and Minister of Justice; 1969 – 1970	Succeeded by Victor Owusu
