= Geoffrey Bing =

British barrister and politician

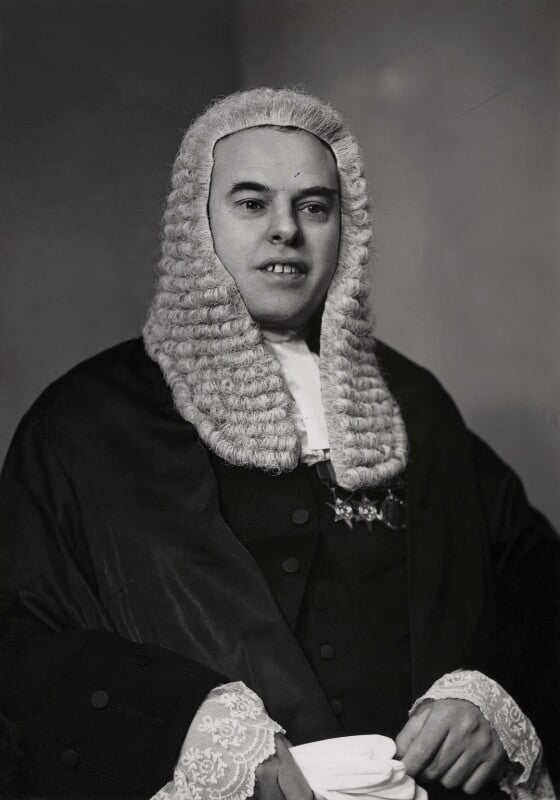
- Bing in 1950

2nd Attorney General of Ghana
- In office 1957–1961
- Prime Minister: Kwame Nkrumah (president from 1960 onwards)
- Preceded by: G. M. Paterson
- Succeeded by: George Mills-Odoi

Member of Parliament for Hornchurch
- In office 5 July 1945 – 26 May 1955
- Preceded by: New constituency
- Succeeded by: Godfrey Lagden

Personal details
- Born: Geoffrey Henry Cecil Bing; 24 July 1909 Craigavad, County Down, Ireland
- Died: 24 April 1977 (aged 67) St Pancras, London, England
- Party: Labour
- Spouses: Christian Frances Blois (m. 1940–1955) Eileen Mary Cullen (m. 1956)
- Children: 3, including Inigo Bing
- Education: Lincoln College, Oxford; Princeton University

Geoffrey Henry Cecil Bing CMG QC (24 July 1909 – 24 April 1977) was a British barrister and politician who served as the Labour Member of Parliament for Hornchurch from 1945 to 1955. He was also Attorney General of Ghana.

== Education and career ==
Born at Craigavad near Belfast, Bing was educated at Rockport School (of which his father was the founding headmaster) and Tonbridge School before going on to Lincoln College, Oxford, where he read history. He graduated with a second-class degree in 1931, before attending Princeton University, where he was a Jane Eliza Procter Visiting Fellow between 1932 and 1933. He was called to the Bar from the Inner Temple in 1934.

Always a radical and a member of the socialist left, Bing was active in the Haldane Society and the National Council for Civil Liberties. During the Spanish Civil War, he joined the International Brigades as a journalist, barely avoiding capture at Bilbao. He was also an early anti-Nazi.

During World War II, he served in the Royal Signals, attaining the rank of major. A 1943 experiment with parachutes at the GSO2 Airborne Forces Development Centre left him disfigured and he bore the scars for many years.

At the 1945 general election, Bing stood for Labour in Hornchurch, winning the seat. He was re-elected in 1950 and 1951, serving until 1955. He served briefly as a junior whip in 1945-46 but this was widely thought to have been the unintended result of confusion on the part of Clement Attlee, who confused him for another Labour MP of a similar name.

== Backbencher ==
On the backbenches, Bing was, according to his Times obituary, "the unrestrained leader of a small group of radicals, never fully trusted by their colleagues and known as 'Bing Boys'".

He took a particular interest in the cases of Timothy Evans and John Christie, and he supported the campaign to overturn the conviction of Evans, which was ultimately successful. He supported Communist China and took a keen interest in Northern Ireland, the brewers' monopoly and parliamentary procedure.

He was also a lawyer, building up a practice in West Africa. He became close to Kwame Nkrumah, the first post-colonial president of Ghana and was appointed Ghana's attorney-general, a post he held until 1961. When Nkrumah was ousted in 1966, Bing was arrested and ill-treated, before being sent home some months later. His memoir of Nkrumah's Ghana, Reap the Whirlwind, was published in 1968.

== Personal life ==
In 1940, he married Christian Frances Blois, former wife of radio producer Edward Archibald Fraser Harding and daughter of Sir Ralph Barrett Macnaghten Blois, 9th Baronet. They had two sons, Inigo Bing and Richard Bing, before divorcing in 1955.

In 1956, he married, secondly, Eileen Mary Cullen. They adopted a son, Patrick Adotey Bing.

Parliament of the United Kingdom
| New constituency | Member of Parliament for Hornchurch; 1945–1955 | Succeeded by Godfrey Lagden |
Political offices
| Preceded by G. M. Paterson | Attorney General of Ghana | Succeeded by George Mills-Odoi |
