= Gustav Koranteng-Addow =

Ghanaian lawyer

8th Attorney General of Ghana
- In office 9 October 1975 – January 1979
- President: Ignatius Kutu Acheampong
- Preceded by: Edward Nathaniel Moore
- Succeeded by: Austin N.E. Amissah

High Court Judge
- In office 1 September 1964 – 9 October 1975

Appeal Court Judge
- In office January 1979 – 7 May 1979

Personal details
- Born: Gustav Koranteng-Addow; 25 October 1918 Akropong–Akuapem, Gold Coast
- Died: 12 February 1988 (aged 69)
- Spouse: Cecilia Koranteng-Addow (m. 1974)
- Education: Accra Academy
- Alma mater: University of London; SOAS University of London (Ph.D)

Gustav Koranteng-Addow (25 October 1918 – 12 February 1988) was the Attorney General and Commissioner for Justice of Ghana from 9 October 1975 to January 1979 under the Supreme Military Council.

== Early life and education ==
Gustav Koranteng-Addow was born on 25 October 1918 at Akropong–Akuapem. His early formative years were spent at the Presbyterian Middle Boys' School, Akropong–Akuapem in the years 1930 to 1933. He continued his studies at the Accra Academy where he obtained his Secondary Education from 1936 to 1939.

== Career ==
Gustav took an appointment as Secretary to the akuapim native authority in 1944 before deciding in 1949 to pursue further education oversees to study for his LL.B and make law his professional career. In that year he entered the University of London and enrolled at the Inns of Court, Middle Temple. In 1956 after a successful completion of his LL.B and an acquisition of a diploma in International and Comparative Air Law, and a call to the English Bar, he returned to Ghana to embark on private practice. His success in this field was underscored by an invitation to the Bench which he accepted. He was appointed on 1 September 1964 and served at many stations in the Judicial Service. In 1968, he received a grant for a fellowship under a British Technical Assistance Programme from the Ministry of Overseas development to research into Customary Arbitration at the School of Oriental and African Studies, London. He earned his doctorate and returned to Ghana to resume work on the bench. On 9 October 1975 he was appointed Attorney General of Ghana. He served in that capacity until January 1979 when he reverted to the court as justice of the appeal court. He however did not stay long on the bench this second time round. On 7 May 1979 he decided to retire on grounds of ill health.

== UNIGOV ==
Amidst mounting nonviolent opposition of the SMC government run by Ignatius Kutu Acheampong, discussions of the country's political future had begun. A committee was set up by the Supreme Military Council in January 1977 to consider a "Union Government" proposal. Dr. Gustav Koranteng-Addow had toured the length and breadth of the country to collate views from the people on the Union government idea proposed by Acheampong. A report was presented on 4 October 1977 by the seventeen-member ad hoc committee appointed by the government and chaired by Dr. Gustav Koranteng-Addow. The report recommended an executive president selected by adult suffrage from a list presented by an electoral college. It also suggested a 140-member legislature of candidates who would run as independents without connection to a political party. In its report the committee said the predominant wish of the people was the establishment of a national government in a no party state. On 30 March 1978 a referendum was held on the choice of system of government. The results of the referendum saw an overwhelming support for the union government as those in favour of union government accounted for a little over 60% of the registered voters that voted. However, continuous strikes by professional groups and student bodies led to the overthrow of Ignatius Kutu Acheampong in July 1978. Following the overthrow of Ignatius Kutu Acheampong by fellow SMC member Fred Akuffo, Dr. Gustav Koranteng-Addow was relieved of his duty as Attorney General of Ghana following his criticisms of the ruling Supreme Military Council's plan to return the country to party politics that year.

== Personal life ==
He was married to Cecilia Koranteng-Addow a former Judge who was abducted on 30 June 1982 together with two other judges and a retired Major in the Ghana Armed Forces.

== Death and tribute ==
He died on 12 February 1988. The Head of Government of the day; Jerry John Rawlings paid the following tribute:

"I wish, therefore, to take this opportunity to express on behalf of the Council and on my own behalf our sincere gratitude and appreciation to you, for your dedicated, loyal and invaluable service to the Nation for almost 15 years, particularly on the Superior Court of Judicature".

== See also ==
- 1978 Ghanaian governmental referendum
- Attorney General of Ghana

Preceded by Edward Nathaniel Moore	Attorney General and Minister of Justice; 1977 – 1979	Succeeded by Austin N.E. Amissah
