= Godfred Yeboah Dame =

Ghanaian lawyer and politician

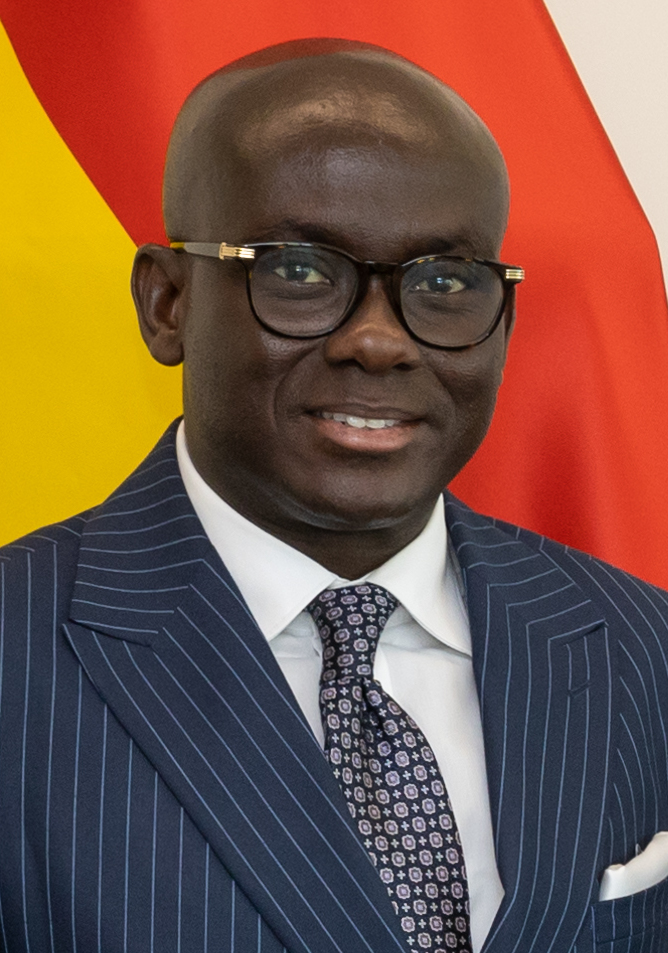
- Godfred Yeboah Dame in 2023

Attorney-General and Minister for Justice
- In office January 2021 – 6 January 2025
- President: Nana Akufo-Addo
- Preceded by: Gloria Akuffo
- Succeeded by: Dominic Akuritinga Ayine

Deputy Attorney-General and Deputy Minister for Justice
- In office March 2017 – January 2021
- President: Nana Akufo-Addo
- Preceded by: Dominic Akuritinga Ayine

Personal details
- Born: 5 June 1979 (age 47)
- Party: New Patriotic Party
- Children: 2
- Education: Adisadel College; University of Ghana; Ghana School of Law
- Profession: Lawyer

Godfred Yeboah Dame (born 5 June 1979) is a Ghanaian lawyer and politician. He is a member of the New Patriotic Party. He was previously the deputy Attorney General and Minister of Justice.

== Early life and education ==
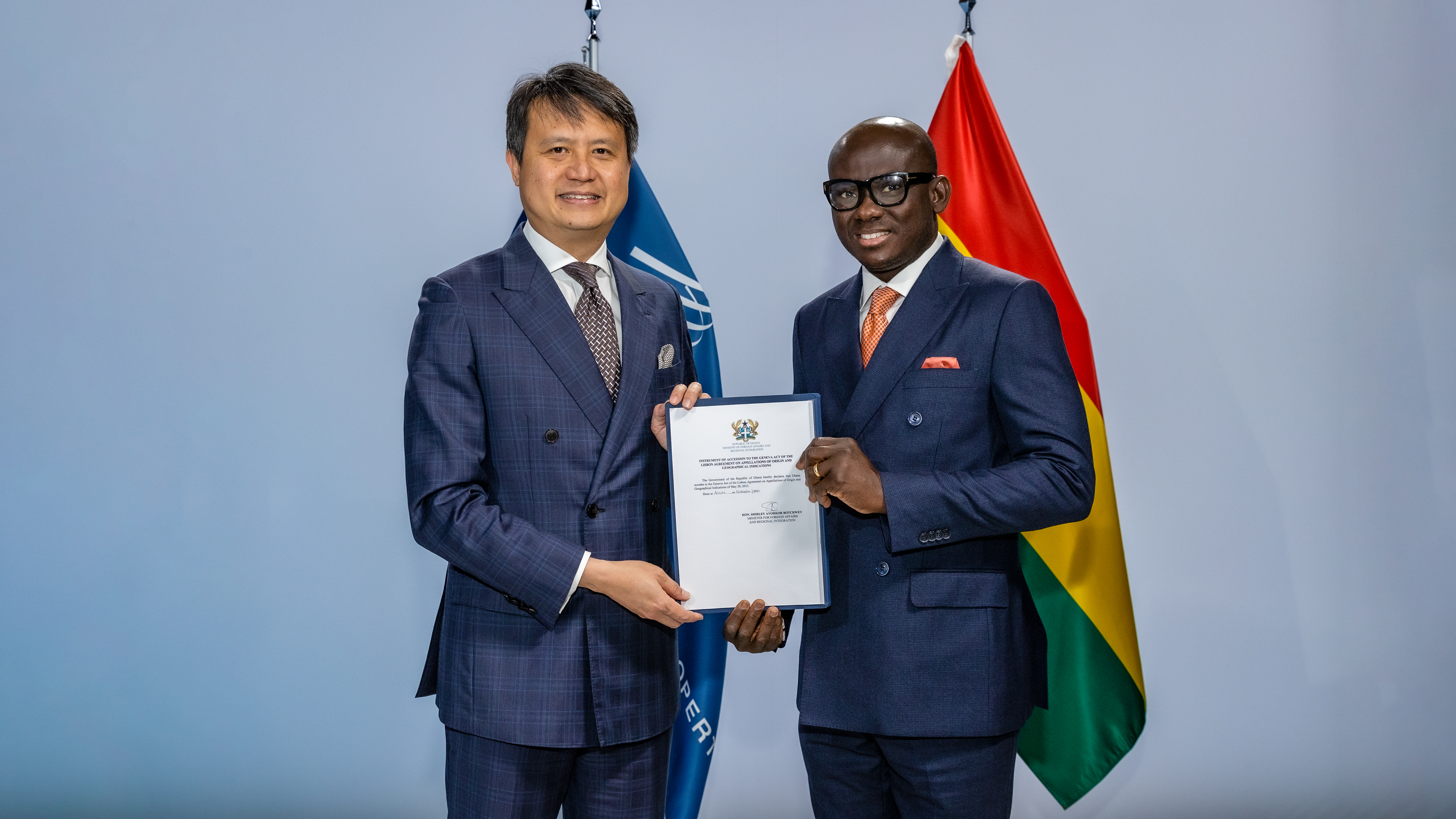
Godfred Yeboah Dame in November 2021

Dame was born on 5 June 1979 and hails from the Bono region. He received his secondary school education at the Adisadel College in Cape Coast, Central region from 1989 to 1996. He attended the University of Ghana where he completed with a Bachelor of Laws degree (LLB) in 2001. He moved to the Ghana School of Law where he obtained his professional certificate to practice law and was called to the Ghana Bar in 2003. He worked as private legal practitioner before entering politics.

== Politics ==
Dame is a member of the New Patriotic Party. In March 2017, he was appointed by President Akufo-Addo to serve as deputy Attorney General and deputy Minister of Justice. On 21 January 2021, after his party retained power in the December 2020 election, he was elevated to the position of substantive Attorney General and Minister of Justice to replace Gloria Akuffo.

== Personal life ==
Dame, a Christian, is married to Dr. Joycelyn Akosua Assimeng Dame, a paediatric infectious disease specialist. They have two children.
