= Dominic Akuritinga Ayine =

Ghanaian politician

The Honourable Dominic Akuritinga Ayine MP
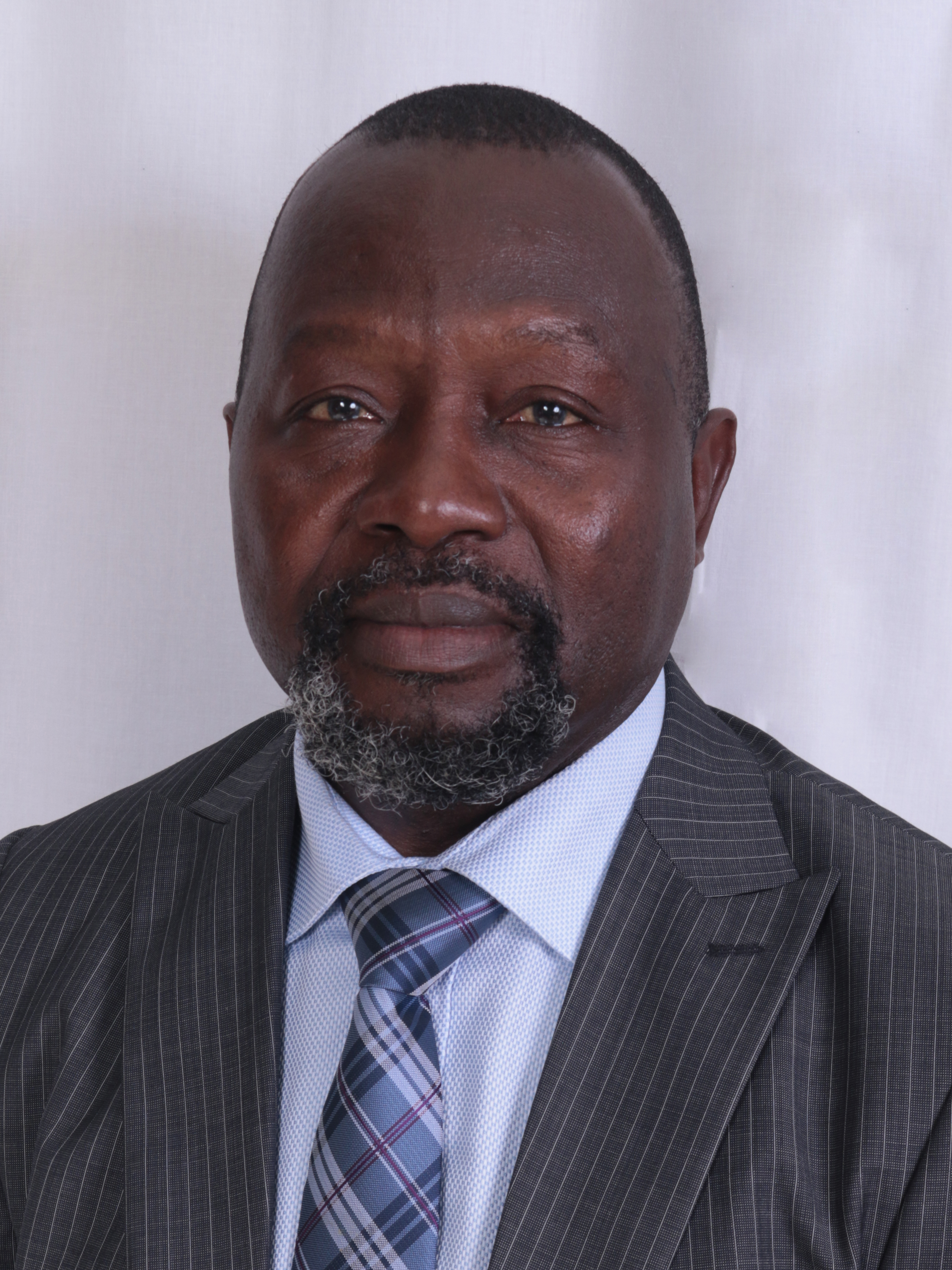

Member of the Ghana Parliament for Bolgatanga East
- Incumbent
- Assumed office 7 January 2012
- Preceded by: New constituency

Attorney General of Ghana
- Incumbent
- Assumed office 22 January 2025
- President: John Mahama
- Preceded by: Godfred Yeboah Dame

Personal details
- Born: 6 January 1966 (age 60)
- Party: National Democratic Congress
- Education: University of Ghana; University of Michigan; Stanford University

Dominic Akuritinga Ayine (born 6 January 1966) is a Ghanaian politician and a member of the Sixth, Seventh, Eighth, and Ninth Parliaments of the Fourth Republic of Ghana representing the Bolgatanga East Constituency in the Upper East Region on the ticket of the National Democratic Congress.

== Early life and education ==
Ayine was born on 6 January 1966 in Zuarungu, Upper east region of Ghana.

He completed his O-level at Notre Dame Seminary Secondary School and A-level at Tamale Secondary School. He earned a Bachelor of Arts in law from the University of Ghana, Legon, in the Greater Accra Region of Ghana and GSL in 1995. He earned his LLM in International Economic Law at the University of Michigan Law School in 1998. He then went to Stanford University Law School, in California, USA, for an LLM in International Trade Law in 2003 and subsequently a JSD (Trade and Democracy) in 2006.

== Politics ==
Hon. Ayine is a member of the National Democratic Congress and represents the Bolgatanga East constituency in the Upper East Region in the Seventh and Eighth Parliaments of the Fourth Republic of Ghana.

=== 2012 election ===
Hon. Ayine first contested the Bolgatanga East constituency parliamentary seat on the ticket of the National Democratic Congress during the 2012 Ghanaian general election and won with 8,841 votes, representing 61.43% of the total votes. He won the parliamentary seat over Rockson Ayine Bukari of New Patriotic Party who pulled 3, 523 votes which is equivalent to 24.48%, parliamentary candidate for PNC David Apasera had 1, 873 votes representing 13.01% and the parliamentary candidate for Progressive People's Party (PPP) Baba Starling Ayinenongma pulled 156 votes which is equivalent to 1.08% of the total votes.

==== 2016 election ====
Hon. Dominic Akuritinga Ayine was re-elected as a member of parliament for the Bolgatanga East constituency parliamentary seat on the ticket of the National Democratic Congress during the 2016 Ghanaian general election and won with 10,492 votes, representing 70.68% of the total votes. He was elected over Emmanuel Abugre Abole of the New Patriotic Party, who pulled 4,224 votes, which is equivalent to 28.44%, and the parliamentary candidate for the Progressive People's Party (PPP), Baba Starling Ayinenogma, had 138 votes, representing 0.93% of the total votes.

=== 2020 election ===
Dominic Akuritinga Ayine again contested the Bolgatanga East (Ghana parliament constituency) parliamentary seat on the ticket of the National Democratic Congress during the 2020 Ghanaian general election and won the parliamentary seat with 12,394 votes representing 67.23% of the total votes. He won the election over Emmanuel Abugre Abole of the New Patriotic Party, who pulled 6,048 votes, equivalent to 32.77% of the total votes.

=== 2024 election ===
Ayine contested the Bolgatanga East parliamentary seat for the fourth time as a candidate for the National Democratic Congress (NDC) during the 2024 Ghanaian general election. He won the seat with 12,002 votes, representing 61.61% of the total votes cast. His closest contender, Mathew Silas Amoah of the New Patriotic Party (NPP), received 7,415 votes, equivalent to 38.07% of the total votes, and Atiah Edwin of PAG received 61 votes, representing 0.31%.

In January 2025, President John Mahamma appointed Ayine as the Attorney General and Justice Minister-Designate.

== Employment ==
- Lawyer
- Lecturer, Faculty of Law, University of Ghana, Legon-Accra
- Deputy Minister for Justice

== Personal life ==
Ayine is a Christian. He is married with seven children.
