= Carlos Renan =

Brazilian footballer (born 1983)

Personal information
- Full name: Carlos Renan Bloise Serra
- Date of birth: 12 February 1983 (age 43)
- Place of birth: Rio de Janeiro, Brazil
- Height: 1.86 m (6 ft 1 in)
- Position: Defender

Senior career*
| Years | Team | Apps | (Gls) |
| 2002–2004 | Flamengo | 2 | (0) |
| 2005 | Serrano | | |
| 2005–2007 | Zagłębie Lubin | 3 | (0) |
| 2008 | Serrano | | |
| 2009 | Duque de Caxias | | |
| 2009 | Portuguesa da Ilha | | |
| 2010 | Bangu | | |
| 2010–2011 | Paços de Ferreira | 0 | (0) |
| 2011–2014 | Bangu | | |

Managerial career
- 2015: Bangu
- 2017: Bangu
- * Club domestic league appearances and goals

Carlos Renan Bloise Serra (born 12 February 1983), known as Carlos Renan, is a Brazilian football manager and former player who played as a defender.

== Career ==
Renan started his career with Flamengo, making two league appearances before moving to Serrano in 2005. After a stint with Polish club Zagłębie Lubin, Renan returned to Serrano before joining other Rio de Janeiro-based clubs, such as Duque de Caxias and Portuguesa da Ilha. Renan retired as a player at Bangu, and started his coaching career there, initially as an assistant. In August 2015, he was appointed manager of the team.

== Honours ==
Flamengo

- Campeonato Carioca: 2004
- Taça Guanabara: 2004
