= Edward Nathaniel Moore =

Ghanaian politician (1926–1998)

8th Attorney General of Ghana
- In office 13 January 1972 – 8 October 1975
- President: Ignatius Kutu Acheampong
- Preceded by: Victor Owusu
- Succeeded by: Gustav Koranteng-Addow

Personal details
- Born: 24 September 1926 Winneba, Ghana
- Died: 7 October 1998 (aged 72) London, England
- Education: Adisadel College
- Alma mater: University of Hull
- Profession: Lawyer

Edward Nathaniel Moore (24 September 1926 – 7 October 1998) was a Ghanaian lawyer and the commissioner for justice and Attorney General of Ghana during the era of the National Redemption Council and Supreme Military Council military regimes.

== Early life and education ==
Moore was born on 24 September 1926 at Winneba in the Central Region. He was the son of George Nathaniel Moore and the grandson of Hon. George Edward Moore, a member of the then Gold Coast Legislative Council.

Moore's early education begun in 1935 at E.C.M. School, Suhum. He continued at Oguaa School, Cape Coast in 1938, completing his primary education in 1939. In 1940 he enrolled at Adisadel College, Cape Coast where he had his secondary education, completed in 1945. In 1952 he proceeded to the United Kingdom to study law at the University of Hull where he obtained the LL.B (Hons) degree in 1956. He was called to the bar at the Middle Temple, UK, that same year.

== Career ==
Moore began teaching after his secondary education in 1946 at Methodist School, Swedru until 1947. Later that year he gained employment as a civil servant at Posts and Telecommunications Department, he worked in that department until 1951.

After his tertiary education in England he returned to Ghana and joined the Ghana Bar Association that same year. In 1957 he began a private legal practice as a Barrister-at-Law Solicitor and Advocate. He worked in that capacity until 1967 when he was appointed chairman of the New Times Limited, which he chaired until 1970. In 1968 he was appointed director of the Bank of Ghana. The following year he was appointed Chairman of the Moore Commission, which was set up to investigated the affairs of the cooperatives during Dr. Busia's tenure as head of government. In 1970 he was the sole arbitrator of the dispute between employees of Barclays Bank and Standard Bank. He was treasurer of the Ghana Bar Association from 1963 to 1965, and served as its president from 1971 to 1972.

Moore was appointed Commissioner of Justice and attorney general of Ghana on 13 January 1972. He was relieved of his duties as attorney general on 8 October 1975.

== Death ==
Moore died in London on 7 October 1998, at the age of 72.
