= Emmanuel Gyekye Tanoh =

Ghanaian lawyer (born 1925)

13th Attorney General of Ghana
- In office 14 December 1988 – 1 April 1993
- President: Jerry John Rawlings
- Preceded by: George Emmanuel Kwesi Aikins
- Succeeded by: Anthony Forson

Secretary for Chieftaincy Affairs
- In office 1986–1988
- President: Jerry Rawlings

Secretary for Health
- In office 1984–1986
- President: Jerry Rawlings

Personal details
- Born: Emmanuel Kwesi Gyekye Tanoh; 30 August 1925 Agona Nsaba, Ghana
- Education: Mfantsipim School; Achimota School
- Alma mater: University of St. Andrews; University of London
- Profession: Lawyer

Emmanuel Kwesi Gyekye Tanoh (born 30 August 1925) was a Ghanaian educationist, lawyer and politician. He was an Attorney General of Ghana, Minister for Health and Minister for Chieftaincy.

== Early life and education ==
Tanoh was born on 30 August 1925 at Agona Nsaba in the Central Region of Ghana. He had his early education at the Presbyterian Primary School at Agona Nsaba from 1931 to 1933 and at the Presbyterian Primary School at Agona Nyakrom from 1934 to 1936. From there, he proceeded to the Methodist Senior School at Agona Nyakrom in 1936. Tanoh had his secondary education at Mfantsipim School, where he studied from 1939 to 1944. In 1945, he enrolled at Achimota College for a two-year programme. In 1948, he was admitted to the University of St. Andrews for his undergraduate studies, graduating in 1951. He then continued at the University of London for his postgraduate teacher's certificate, which he was awarded in 1953. He began his legal studies in 1955 and was called to the English Bar in 1958.

== Career ==
Following his postgraduate studies at the University of London, he returned to Ghana in 1953 to join the teaching staff of Mfantsipim School and later the Takoradi Government Secondary School, while doubling as an education officer for the Ministry of Education from 1953 to 1955. After his legal studies, Tanoh worked as a lawyer from 1955 until his appointment as the Central Regional Minister in 1983. He served in that capacity until 1984 when he was appointed Secretary of Health. In 1986, he was appointed Secretary for Chieftaincy, and he served in that capacity until 1988, when he was appointed Attorney General and Minister for Justice. He worked in this capacity until 1993, when he was succeeded by Anthony Forson.

== Personal life ==
Tanoh was married to Alvira Ewurabena Amoonua Tanoh. Together, they had four children, including politician Goozie Tanoh. His hobbies included reading.
