= George Emmanuel Kwesi Aikins =

Ghanaian attorney and jurist

12th Attorney General of Ghana
- In office 1982–1988
- President: Flt. Lt. Jerry Rawlings
- Preceded by: A. L. Djabatey
- Succeeded by: Emmanuel Gyekye Tanoh

Supreme Court Judge
- In office 20 February 1990 – 2 September 1998
- Appointed by: Flt. Lt. Jerry Rawlings

Personal details
- Born: George Emmanuel Kwesi Aikins; 2 September 1923 Gold Coast
- Died: 17 April 2013 (aged 89)
- Education: Mfantsipim School
- Alma mater: Ghana School of Law; University of London

George Emmanuel Kwesi Aikins (born 2 September 1923; died 17 April 2013) was a lawyer and politician. He served as Attorney General and secretary for Justice of Ghana during the PNDC government. He also served as a justice of the Supreme Court of Ghana in the fourth republic.

== Early life and education ==
Aikins was born on 2 September 1923. His early education begun in 1934 at Ahmadiya Primary School. In 1942 he was sent to the African Methodist Episcopal School at Cape Coast, he studied there for a year. He had private studies and part-time studies as well. He is alleged to have been a member of the students that rioted against the arrest of the big six in 1948 as a student of Mfantsipim School. He continued at the Ghana School of Law in 1958 and received his diploma in law in 1961. He was a member of the first nine students that were enrolled as lawyers from the school on 22 June 1963. He also studied as an external student of the University of London.

== Career and politics ==
Aikins joined the civil service in 1949 as a second division clerk and later a senior executive officer. He served in that capacity until 1963 when he was called to the Ghanaian bar. That same year he took office as an assistant state attorney he later rose to the ranks of chief state attorney in 1976. He was an adviser to the National House of Chiefs from 1973 to 1976 and a member of the Police Council from 1979 to 1981. He was also a member of the Prisons Service Board in 1979. In 1982 he was appointed Secretary of Justice and Attorney General by the Provisional National Defence Council. He served in this position until 1988. He was later appointed justice of the supreme Court of Ghana. He retired on 2 September 1998.

== Personal life ==
He was married with seven children. His hobbies included football, gardening and table tennis.

According to an anniversary tribute in the Daily Graphic publication, April 17, 2014 marked the one-year anniversary of Aikins' death.

== See also ==
- List of judges of the Supreme Court of Ghana
- Supreme Court of Ghana
- Attorney General of Ghana
