= Joe Reindorf =

Ghanaian politician

10th Attorney General of Ghana
- In office 24 September 1979 – August 1981
- President: Hilla Limann
- Preceded by: Austin Amissah
- Succeeded by: A. L. Djabatey

Personal details
- Born: Joe Reindorf; 1924 Accra, Gold Coast
- Died: 1996 (aged 71–72)
- Education: Achimota School
- Alma mater: University of Cambridge

Joe Reindorf (1924 – 1996) was a Ghanaian historian, lawyer and politician. He served in the third republic as Attorney General and minister for Justice of Ghana.

== Early life and education ==
Formerly a pupil of Achimota School, his contemporaries included K. B. Asante, Victor Owusu and R. R. Amponsah. He was a research student in history at Cambridge University in 1951, completing his studies in 1956 and finishing a law degree at the same time.

== Career ==
He was called to the English bar in 1954. He returned to Ghana after his research studies in 1956 to enter into private legal practice. In 1962 he joined the University of Ghana as a research fellow in history. This stint ended in 1966 when he went back into private practice. He was president of the Ghana Bar Association in 1970–1971.

== Politics ==
During the inception of the third republic in 1979, he was appointed Attorney General and minister for Justice in the Limann led government. He resigned after he was moved to the ministry of Local Government in a 1981 ministerial reshuffle. He was replaced by his deputy Archibald Lartey Djabatey.

== Death ==
He died in 1996 at the age of 72.

== See also ==
- Attorney General of Ghana
- Limann government
