= Blois baronets =

Title in the Baronetage of England

Arms of Blois baronets

The Blois Baronetcy, of Grundisburgh and Cockfield Hall in the County of Suffolk, is a title in the Baronetage of England. It was created on 15 April 1686 for Charles Blois. He represented Ipswich and Dunwich in the House of Commons. The seventh Baronet was a Major in the 1st Dragoons and fought at the Battle of Waterloo in 1815.

Evelyn Macleod, Baroness Macleod of Borve (née Blois), was the granddaughter of the eighth baronet, who had six sons and six daughters. Judge Inigo Bing is the grandson of the ninth baronet.

== Blois baronets, of Grundisburgh and Cockfield Hall (1686) ==
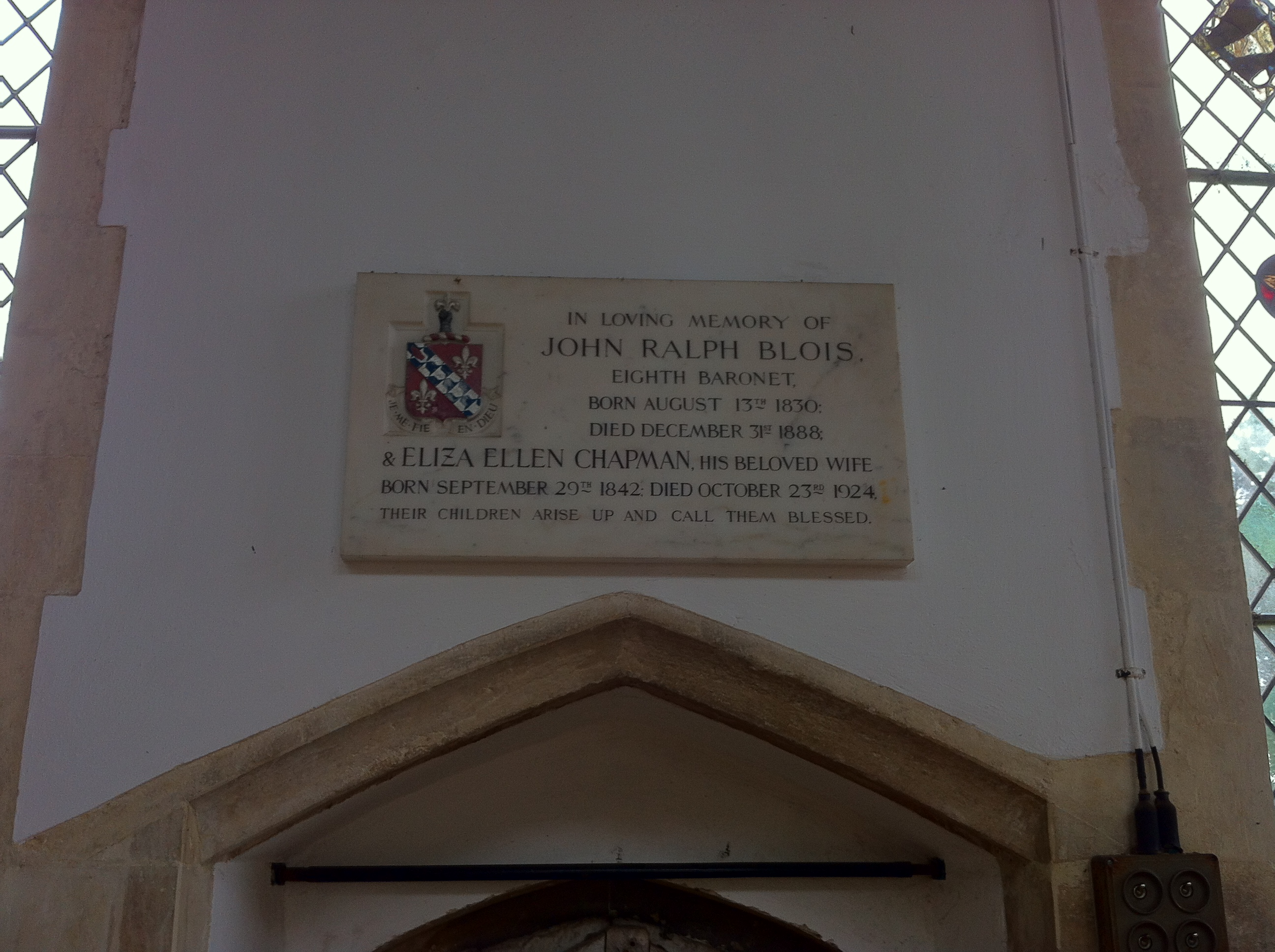
Memorial to John Ralph Blois, 8th Baronet, in Holy Trinity Church, Blythburgh

- Sir Charles Blois, 1st Baronet (1657–1738)
  - William Blois (1691–1734)
- Sir Charles Blois, 2nd Baronet (1733–1760)
- Sir Charles Blois, 3rd Baronet (1692–1761)
- Sir Ralph Blois, 4th Baronet (1706–1762)
- Sir John Blois, 5th Baronet (1740–1810)
- Sir Charles Blois, 6th Baronet (1766–1850)
- Sir Charles Blois, 7th Baronet (1794–1855)
  - Commander John Ralph Blois (1795–1853)
- Sir John Ralph Blois, 8th Baronet (1830–1888)
- Sir Ralph Barrett Macnaghten Blois, 9th Baronet (1866–1950)
- Sir Gervase Ralph Edmund Blois, 10th Baronet (1901–1968)
- Sir Charles Nicholas Gervase Blois, 11th Baronet (born 1939)

The heir apparent to the baronetcy is Andrew Charles David Blois (born 1971).
