= Victor Owusu =

Ghanaian politician

4th and 6th Attorney General of Ghana
- In office 1966–1969
- President: Joseph Arthur Ankrah
- Preceded by: Bashiru Kwaw-Swanzy
- Succeeded by: N. Y. B. Adade
- In office 1971–1972
- President: Edward Akufo-Addo
- Prime Minister: Kofi Abrefa Busia
- Preceded by: N. Y. B. Adade
- Succeeded by: E. N. Moore

Minister for Foreign Affairs
- In office 1969–1971
- President: Edward Akufo-Addo
- Prime Minister: Kofi Abrefa Busia
- Preceded by: Patrick Dankwa Anin
- Succeeded by: William Ofori Atta

Personal details
- Born: Victor Owusu; 26 December 1923 Agona, Gold Coast
- Died: 16 December 2000 (aged 76) Accra
- Education: Achimota School; University of Nottingham; University of London

Victor Owusu (26 December 1923 – 16 December 2000) was a Ghanaian politician and lawyer. He served as Attorney General and Minister for Justice on two occasions which were under the NLC and then Busia regime and also became Minister for Foreign Affairs under the Busia regime. He was the Popular Front Party's presidential candidate for the 1979 Ghanaian general election.

== Early life ==
Owusu was born on 26 December 1923 in Agona, Ashanti Region. Owusu was an economist who later trained as a lawyer. He was a prominent member of the National Liberation Movement which stood for the 1956 elections in the Gold Coast prior to elections. During the First Republic, he was detained under the Preventive Detention Act (1958) by the Kwame Nkrumah government. He was released after the 24 February 1966 coup d'état that brought in the military National Liberation Council (NLC) government. He was appointed Attorney General and Minister for Justice by the NLC.

== Education ==
Victor Owusu attended Achimota School between 1937 and 1945. There, his contemporaries included K. B. Asante and Joe Reindorf. He proceeded to the United Kingdom in 1946 to study Economics at the University of Nottingham and later studied law at the University of London. He was called to the bar at Lincoln's Inn in 1952.

== In Government ==
He was a member of the Progress Party that won the 1969 elections. Kofi Abrefa Busia appointed him foreign minister twice in the Second Republic. The first time was in 1969 and the second was between 1969 and 1971. On both occasions, he took over the portfolio from Patrick Dankwa Anin, who also served twice. The Second Republic came to an end with the 13 January 1972 coup led by General (then Colonel) I. K. Acheampong.

== Presidential Candidate ==
Owusu was a founding member and leader of the Popular Front Party in the Third Republic. He was the runner-up to Dr. Hilla Limann of the People's National Party (PNP) in the 1979 Ghanaian presidential elections with 38% of the votes after the second round of voting. After the election, the PFP merged with other opposition parties to form the All People's Party (AFP) under Owusu's leadership. The AFP, along with other political parties, were banned after the 31 December 1981 coup by the Provisional National Defence Council led by Flt. Lt. Jerry Rawlings.

== Later life ==
From 1991 until his death, Victor Owusu lived in Putney, London, United Kingdom. He died in London on 16 December 2000. He was married to Agnes Owusu.

== Trivia ==
John Kufuor, president of Ghana, said he had practised as a junior in Victor Owusu's law firm. He was an uncle of Dr Charles Wereko-Brobby and a maternal half-brother to Kobina Annan, a retired diplomat who is also a paternal half-brother to Kofi Annan.

== See also ==
- Attorney General of Ghana
- Minister for Foreign Affairs (Ghana)

Parliament of Ghana
Vacant Parliament suspended	Member of Parliament; 1969 – 72	Vacant Parliament suspended
Political offices
Preceded by Bashiru Kwaw-Swanzy	Attorney General and Minister of Justice; 1966 – 1969	Succeeded by N. Y. B. Adade
Preceded by Patrick Dankwa Anin	Foreign Minister; 1969	Succeeded by Patrick Dankwa Anin
Preceded by Patrick Dankwa Anin	Foreign Minister; 1969 – 1971	Succeeded by William Ofori Atta
Preceded by N. Y. B. Adade	Attorney General and Minister of Justice; 1971 – 1972	Succeeded by E. N. Moore
New title	Leader of the Opposition; 1979 – 1981	Succeeded by Parties banned
Party political offices
New political party	Popular Front Party presidential nominee 1979	Merged with other parties
New political party	Leader of All People's Party ? – 1981	Parties banned
