= Ghana Bar Association =

Professional association

- Predecessor: Gold Coast Bar Association
- Formation: 1876; 150 years ago
- Type: Professional association
- Purpose: To promote legal professionalism
- Location: Accra, Ghana
- Official language: English
- National President: Efua Ghartey
- Website: www.ghanabar.org

The Ghana Bar Association (GBA) is a professional association of lawyers in Ghana, including what used to be called solicitors and barristers but they are now called legal practitioners, as well as magistrates.By convention, all lawyers admitted to practice in Ghana become automatic members of the association. The GBA has its roots in the Gold Coast Bar Association, of which the first president was Sierra Leonean lawyer Frans Dove.

The Ghana Bar Association drew up its first formal constitution and code of ethics in 1958 and from then on, except for a few occasions when due to political reasons an annual conference has not been possible, the Bar Association holds a conference annually to take important decisions and to elect its officers who hold office for only one year but are eligible for re-election. The Ghana Bar Association considers that in this sense it is one of the most democratic institutions in Ghana. The Ghana Bar Association is made up of lawyers with good standing who are legally declared to practise law in Ghana.

== Etymology ==
The term "bar" is said to mean "the whole body of lawyers, the legal profession", and comes ultimately from English custom. In the early 16th century, a railing divided the hall in the Inns of Court, with students occupying the body of the hall and readers or benchers on the other side. Students who officially became lawyers crossed the symbolic physical barrier and were "admitted to the bar". Later, this was popularly assumed to mean the wooden railing marking off the area around the judge's seat in a courtroom, where prisoners stood for arraignment and where a barrister stood to plead. In modern courtrooms, a railing may still be in place to enclose the space that is occupied by legal counsel as well as the criminal defendants and civil litigants who have business pending before the court.

== History and membership ==
The British Parliament established the Supreme Court of Judicature for the Gold Coast Colony in 1876, with a Chief Justice and no more than four Puisne Justices. In 1887, John Mensah Sarbah became the first native of Ghana to be called to the bar by Lincoln's Inn. The legal system was based on that of England, in which solicitors provide legal advice and prepare legal documents, while barristers act as advocates in court. However, this division was not observed in practice in Ghana and in 1960 an act abolished the distinction. Until the Ghana School of Law was established in 1958, all lawyers were trained abroad, almost always at the Inns of Court in England. As of 2011, there were about 2,500 practising lawyers, although not all had registered as members of the Bar Association.

Even though the legal profession in The Gold Coast (now Ghana) can be traced to as far back as 1846, the Ghana Bar Association as a body had its first constitution in 1958.

The Bar has had many leaders but apart from a few outstanding ones such as Frans Dove, there is no proper record of the office holders of the Bar before 1957, from which time the Bar Association has regularly had a president, a secretary and treasurer and other members democratically elected in accordance with the constitution of the Bar.

The current national president of the GBA is Efua Ghartey. She is the first and only female president of the GBA.

Some past presidents of the GBA include:

- Robert Samuel Blay (1957–1959) and (1960–1962)
- Archie Casely-Hayford (1959–1960)
- J. B. Danquah (1962–1963)
- Victor Owusu (acting 1963–1965) and (1965–1966)
- William Ofori-Atta (1966–1967)
- Joe Appiah (1967–1970)
- Joe Reindorf (1970–1971)
- Edward Nathaniel Moore (1971–1972)
- J. B. Quashie-Idun (1972–1976)
- J. K. F. Adadevoh (1976–1979)
- W. A. N. Adumoah-Bossman (1979–1981)
- E. D. Kom (1981–1982)
- J. K. Agyemang (1982–1985)
- Peter Ala Adjetey (1985–1989)
- Anthony K. Mmieh (1989–1992?)
- Nutifafa Kuenyehia (1992–95),
- Sam Okudzeto(1995–98)
- Joseph Ebow Quashie (1998–2001)
- Paul Adu-Gyamfi (2001–?)
- Solomon Kwame Tetteh
- Nii Osah Mills (2007–08)
- Frank Beecham (2009–12)
- Nene A. O. Amegatcher (2012–2015)
- Benson Nutsukpui (2015–2018)
- Tony Forson Jnr. (2018–2021)
- Yaw Acheampong Boafo (2021–24)
- Efua Ghartey (2024- )

The Ghana Bar Association is a member of the International Bar Association.

== Controversy ==
In October 2010, then GBA Vice President, Mr. Justice Kusi-Minkah Premo, called on the Chief Justice and the council to eliminate inconsistency, corruption and misconduct by judges. In April 2011, then National President Frank W. K. Beecham spoke in defence of Mr Justice E. K. Ayebi, a judge who had come under attack after acquitting 14 defendants in a murder trial.

In July 2011, four lawyers made allegations of widespread corruption among judges. The GBA condemned the four for making unsubstantiated claims, and asked them to name the judges. Another lawyer openly confessed to having bribed a judge.The GBA said it would take legal steps to prosecute him. The four lawyers were blacklisted by the Association of Magistrates and Judges. They and others stated that they were considering forming an alternative Association. The Ghana Bar Association held its annual general meeting in Cape Coast in September 2011, soon after two magistrates had been sacked for demanding bribes. Then GBA President Frank Beecham said that the association would fight corruption in all its forms. The GBA would establish a complaints unit to take complaints about corruption and ensure that offenders were prosecuted.

== See also ==
- General Legal Council
