= Attorney General of Ghana =

The Attorney General of Ghana is the chief legal advisor to the Ghanaian government. The attorney general is also responsible for the Ministry of Justice. The Attorney General also serves as a member of the General Legal Council which regulates legal practice in Ghana.

== List of Attorneys General ==
The current Attorney General is Dominic Akuritinga Ayine. He was appointed by President John Mahama in 2025.
Betty Mould-Iddrisu was the first woman to be appointed as Attorney-General in Ghana. She was appointed by President John Atta Mills and was in office between 2009 and 2011. Obed Asamoah was appointed by President Jerry Rawlings. He was the longest serving Attorney-General. He served as Acting Attorney-General between November 1993 and May 1997 and then continued as the substantive Attorney-General from May 1997 until January 2001.

Number	Minister	Took office	Left office	Government	Party
1	G. M. Paterson	6 March 1957	August 1957	Nkrumah government	Convention People's Party
2	Geoffrey Bing	7 August 1957	29 August 1961	Nkrumah government	Convention People's Party
3	George Commey Mills-Odoi	30 September 1961	1962	Nkrumah government	Convention People's Party
4	Bashiru Kwaw-Swanzy	3 September 1962	24 February 1966	Nkrumah government	Convention People's Party
5	Victor Owusu	1966	April 1969	National Liberation Council	Military government
6	Nicholas Yaw Boafo Adade (MP)	April 1969	September 1969	National Liberation Council	Military government
6	Nicholas Yaw Boafo Adade (MP)	14 September 1969	January 1971	Busia government	Progress Party
7	Victor Owusu (MP)	January 1971	12 January 1972	Busia government	Progress Party
8	Edward Nathaniel Moore	13 January 1972	8 October 1975	National Redemption Council	Military government
9	Dr. Gustav Koranteng-Addow	9 October 1975	January 1979	Supreme Military Council	Military government
10	Austin N. E. Amissah	1 January 1979	23 September 1979	Armed Forces Revolutionary Council	Military government
11	Joe Reindorf	24 September 1979	August 1981	Limann government	People's National Party
12	A. L. Djabatey	1 October 1981	31 December 1981	Limann government	People's National Party
13	G. E. K. Aikins	25 June 1982	1988	Provisional National Defence Council	Military government
14	E. G. Tanoh	14 December 1988	1 April 1993	Provisional National Defence Council	Military government
15	Anthony Forson	1 March 1993	30 October 1993	Rawlings government	National Democratic Congress
	Obed Asamoah (Acting AG)	November 1993	May 1997	Rawlings government	National Democratic Congress
16	Obed Asamoah	May 1997	6 January 2001	Rawlings government	National Democratic Congress
17	Nana Akufo-Addo	1 February 2001	24 April 2003	Kufuor government	New Patriotic Party
18	Papa Owusu-Ankomah (MP)	1 April 2003	2005	Kufuor government	New Patriotic Party
19	J. Ayikoi Otoo	1 February 2005	2006	Kufuor government	New Patriotic Party
20	Joe Ghartey (MP)	16 June 2006	7 January 2009	Kufuor government	New Patriotic Party
21	Betty Mould-Iddrisu	2009	2011	Mills government	National Democratic Congress
22	Martin Amidu	4 January 2011	2012	Mills government	National Democratic Congress
23	Benjamin Kunbuor	25 January 2012	24 October 2012	Mills government	National Democratic Congress
23	Benjamin Kunbuor	24 October 2012	7 January 2013	Mahama government	National Democratic Congress
24	Marietta Brew Appiah-Oppong	February 2013	7 January 2017	Mahama government	National Democratic Congress
25	Gloria Akuffo	February 2017	January 2021	Akuffo Addo government	New Patriotic Party
26	Godfred Yeboah Dame	January 2021	6 January 2025	Akuffo Addo government	New Patriotic Party
27	Dominic Akuritinga Ayine (MP)	22 January 2025	Incumbent	Mahama 2nd government	National Democratic Congress

== See also ==
- Justice ministry
- General Legal Council
- Ministry of Justice (Ghana)
- Politics of Ghana
