= Dennis Dominic Adjei =

Ghanaian judge

Justice Dennis Dominic Adjei JSC, FGA

Justice of the Supreme Court of Ghana
- Incumbent
- Assumed office 3 July 2025
- Nominated by: John Mahama

Justice of the Court of Appeal
- In office 7 July 2010 – 3 July 2025
- Nominated by: John Atta Mills

Personal details
- Born: March 25, 1964 (age 62) Ghana
- Education: Atwimaman Secondary School; Wenchi Methodist Senior High School
- Alma mater: University of Ghana; Ghana School of Law; University of London; Duke University School of Law
- Profession: Judge

Sir Dennis Dominic Adjei JSC, FGA is a Ghanaian jurist and an active justice of the Supreme Court of Ghana. Prior to his appointment to the Supreme Court bench, he served as a Justice of the African Court on Human and Peoples' Rights and a Justice of the Appeal Court of Ghana. He was a member of the nine-member Advisory Committee of the International Criminal Court. He is also a Fellow of the Ghana Academy of Arts and Sciences, elected on 5 December 2019.

== Early life and education ==
Adjei was born on 25 March 1964. He attended Atwimaman Secondary School (now Afia Kobi Ampem Senior High School), Trabuom in 1985, and Wenchi Methodist Senior High School in 1987. He pursued higher education at the University of Ghana, Legon, where he obtained a B.A. in Law and Linguistics from 1988 to 1991. He was called to the Ghana Bar in 1993 after completing his studies at the Ghana School of Law. His academic credentials include a Master of Laws (LLM) in Criminology and Criminal Justice from the University of London in 2010, a Master of Judicial Studies (MJS) from Duke University School of Law, Durham, North Carolina, USA in 2014, and an Executive Master of Public Administration (EMPA) from the Ghana Institute of Management and Public Administration (GIMPA) in 2010.

== Career ==
Adjei began his legal career in 1993 as an Associate at Owusu Bempah Law Chambers in Kumasi, Ghana, where he worked until 1999. In 1999, he founded and served as Managing Partner of Holy Trinity Chambers in Kumasi, a position he held until 2010. From 2008 to 2010, he served as President of the Ghana Bar Association's Ashanti Region Branch and as a member of the Bar Council of the Ghana Bar Association.

In 2010, Adjei was appointed as a Justice of the Court of Appeal in Ghana, that same year, he began serving as Chairperson of the Private Process Service Committee of the Judicial Service of Ghana, and started lecturing as a Senior Lecturer at the Ghana School of Law in Accra, teaching Interpretation of Statutes and Deeds and Land Law and Conveyancing. Additionally, he began lecturing in criminal law and criminal procedure at the Judicial Training Institute of Ghana and the Kofi Annan Peace Keeping Centre.

In 2012, Adjei was elected President of the Association of Magistrates and Judges of Ghana (AMJG), serving two consecutive terms until 2016. Also in 2012, he became Chairperson of the Appeal Process Committee of the Judicial Service of Ghana, and served as Oversight Judge for the Western and Central Regions of Ghana until 2015. In 2013, he was appointed by the then Chief Justice Georgina Theodora Wood as one of five judges to develop the Ghana Sentencing Guidelines. From 2013 to 2014, he served as Director of the Public Complaints Unit and Courts Inspectorate Unit of the Judicial Service of Ghana.

In 2014, Adjei was appointed Director of the Judicial Training Institute of Ghana, serving until 2019, and became a Member of the University of Ghana School of Law Management Committee. In 2015, he was appointed Oversight Judge for the Courts in Ashanti, Brong-Ahafo, Northern, Upper West, and Upper East Regions of Ghana, serving until 2019. That same year, he chaired the Criminal Law Review Committee, established by the Attorney-General and Minister of Justice, to review the Criminal Offences Act, 1960 (Act 29) and the Evidence Act, 1975 (N.R.C.D. 323) regarding laws on corruption. From 2015 to 2017, he served as Joint Chairperson, alongside the Attorney-General and Minister for Justice, of the Joint Steering Committee for the Legal and Justice Sector Reform Programme. Additionally, from 2014 to 2016, he chaired the Timber Validation Committee in Ghana.

In 2016, Adjei began serving as an Adjunct Associate Professor at the University of Cape Coast and Kwame Nkrumah University of Science and Technology (KNUST) in Kumasi, where he lectured on International Migration Law in the Masters in Justice and Security Administration. That year, he was appointed as a Consultant to the Sierra Leone Judiciary to assist in reforming criminal and civil laws and chaired the First Sierra Leone Judicial Conference.

In 2017, Adjei was elected Chairperson of the Africa Judicial Network on Environmental Law, headquartered in Kenya, during a meeting in Johannesburg. He was re-elected in 2019 at the Maputo Symposium and served until October 2021.

In 2018, Adjei was appointed by Chief Justice Sophia Abena Boafoa Akuffo as one of five judges to produce the Practice Direction (Disclosures and Case Management in Criminal Proceedings), which came into effect in October 2018 and is used by Ghanaian courts. That year, at the request of the GIMPA University Council and approval by the Chief Justice, he served as Honorific Dean of the Faculty of Law at the Ghana Institute of Management and Public Administration (GIMPA), a role he held until August 2020.

Since 2019, Adjei has served as acting director of the Judicial Training Institute of Ghana. In 2021, he was appointed as a member of the National Mechanism for Reporting Human Rights and Follow-up and a year later, elected judge of the African Court on Human and Peoples’ Rights.

In 2022, Adjei was elected as the Inns of Court Judicial Fellow at the Advanced Legal Institute of the University of London for the 2022–2023 academic year.

== Supreme Court appointment ==
=== Nomination ===
In April 2025, Adjei, was nominated by President John Dramani Mahama for appointment to the Supreme Court of Ghana, alongside six other Court of Appeal judges: Justice Senyo Dzamefe, Justice Gbiel Simon Suurbaareh, Justice Philip Bright Mensah, Justice Janapare Adzua Bartels-Kodwo, Justice Hafisata Amaleboba, and Justice Kweku Tawiah Ackaah-Boafo. The nominations were made in accordance with Article 144(2) of the 1992 Constitution of Ghana, which mandates that presidential appointments to the Supreme Court be made in consultation with the Council of State and subject to parliamentary approval as outlined in a letter from the Executive Secretary to the President, Dr. Callistus Mahama, addressed to the acting Chief Justice, Justice Paul Baffoe-Bonnie. The Appointments Committee of Parliament scheduled the vetting of the seven nominees from Monday, 16 June 2025, to Wednesday, 18 June 2025.

=== Vetting ===
On Monday, 16 June 2025, Adjei underwent vetting by Parliament's Appointments Committee as part of his nomination for the position of Justice of the Supreme Court of Ghana. He was the second nominee vetted that day, following Justice Senyo Dzamefe. During the vetting, Adjei addressed several legal and constitutional issues.

On the topic of capital punishment, Adjei expressed the view that Ghana's laws mandating the death penalty for offences such as treason, high treason, and certain provisions of the Armed Forces Act (Act 105) should be reformed to grant judges discretion in sentencing. He argued that mandatory death penalties violate the fundamental right to life and Ghana's obligations under Article 4 of the African Charter on Human and Peoples’ Rights, which emphasizes the sanctity of life. Citing his experience at the African Court on Human and Peoples’ Rights, he referenced rulings against Tanzania and Benin, where mandatory death penalties were deemed violations of human rights law, noting that Ghana could face similar legal challenges if reforms are not implemented.

Regarding child marriage and witchcraft, Adjei described accusations of witchcraft as an outdated cultural practice, referencing a ruling by the African Court on Human and Peoples’ Rights condemning Tanzania's legal recognition of witchcraft. He also highlighted a constitutional inconsistency in Ghana's laws, noting that while the legal age for consensual sex is 16, the minimum age for marriage is 18. He suggested aligning these ages to 18 to ensure consistency and to allow individuals to pursue education or vocational training, thereby enhancing their ability to support themselves in the event of marriage dissolution.

On presidential succession, Adjei argued that the 1992 Constitution of Ghana limits succession to the President, Vice President, and Speaker of Parliament, excluding the Chief Justice. He described this as “capping legitimacy,” emphasizing that the Constitution's intent is to ensure orderly transitions by restricting succession to these three roles. He rejected suggestions from past legal opinions, such as those in the 2003-2004 Asare v. Attorney General case, which proposed the Chief Justice as a potential successor, noting that such obiter dicta are non-binding and that extending succession beyond the specified roles could risk creating a power vacuum.

When questioned about handling cases involving LGBTQ+ rights, given his active role in the Catholic Church, Adjei stressed the value of preserving impartiality in the judiciary. He stated that personal beliefs, whether religious or otherwise, do not influence his judicial decisions, as judges are bound by their oath to remain impartial. Drawing from his experience at the African Court on Human and Peoples’ Rights, where he has handled cases involving sensitive issues such as sexual orientation, he affirmed that he applies the law based on facts, without allowing personal faith to affect outcomes. He cautioned that allowing religious beliefs to influence judgments could undermine the legal system by encouraging interest-based representation on the bench.

=== Approval ===
On 18 June 2025, the Parliament of Ghana approved the appointment of Adjei to the Supreme Court, alongside six other Court of Appeal justices: Justices Senyo Dzamefe, Gbiel Simon Suurbaareh, Philip Bright Mensah, Janapare Adzua Bartels-Kodwo, Hafisata Amaleboba, and Kweku Tawiah Ackaah-Boafo. The decision followed the adoption of the report from the 11-member Appointments Committee, which conducted the vetting of the nominees between 16 June and 18 June 2025.

The committee's report, presented by Chairman Bernard Ahiafor, noted that Justice Adjei and his fellow nominees met the necessary qualifications, demonstrated appropriate judicial temperament, and upheld constitutional values suitable for Supreme Court justices. The committee's vote was divided, with all Majority members supporting the nominations and all Minority members opposing them. The Minority contended that the appointments, including that of Justice Adjei, coincided with the recent suspension of the Chief Justice, raising constitutional concerns and suggesting an effort to influence the judiciary's composition. They referenced procedural issues under Articles 146 and 296 of the 1992 Constitution and expressed worries about judicial independence, with Minority Leader Alexander Afenyo-Markin labelling the process as executive overreach. Additionally, Dr. Ibrahim Murtala Muhammed, MP for Tamale Central, criticized the high number of judicial appointments made under former President Nana Akufo-Addo, suggesting that Justice Adjei's nomination was part of a broader strategy to shape the judiciary.

Despite the Minority's objections, the Majority's support ensured parliamentary approval for Adjei and the other nominees.

=== Swearing-in ===
On Thursday, 3 July 2025, Adjei was sworn in as a Justice of the Supreme Court of Ghana by President John Dramani Mahama during a ceremony held at the Jubilee House in Accra. Adjei was one of seven newly appointed justices, alongside Justices Senyo Dzamefe, Gbiel Simon Suurbaareh, Kweku Tawiah Ackaah-Boafo, Philip Bright Mensah, Janapare Bartels-Kodwo, and Hafisata Amaleboba, all of whom were elevated from the Court of Appeal.

During the ceremony, President Mahama emphasized the importance of judicial independence, stating that the judiciary is a partner in national development and must remain free from political interference, economic manipulation, and public intimidation. He urged Adjei and the other justices to uphold their oath of office by maintaining integrity, fairness, and impartiality in their judicial duties, guided by constitutional principles rather than public pressure or personal biases.

== Publications ==
Adjei has authored many articles, some of his publications include:

- Constitutional Law of Ghana- Evolution, Theory and Practice (2020)
- Modern Approach to the Law of Interpretation in Ghana (3rd Edition, Reprinted, 2021)
- Criminal Procedure and Practice in Ghana (3rd Edition, 2021)
- Land Law, Practice and Conveyancing in Ghana (3rd Edition, 2021)
- Contemporary Criminal Law in Ghana (3rd Edition, 2021)

He has also co-authored The Alternative Dispute Resolution- A Ghanaian Perspective.

== Personal life ==
In recognition of his contributions, Adjei was knighted by Pope Emeritus Benedict XVI into the Order of St. Gregory the Great in 2005.
