= Hafisata Amaleboba =

Ghanaian judge

Justice Hafisata Amaleboba JSC

Justice of the Supreme Court of Ghana
- Incumbent
- Assumed office 3 July 2025
- Nominated by: John Mahama

Justice of the Court of Appeal
- In office 2022 – 3 July 2025
- Nominated by: Nana Akuffo Addo

Justice of the High Court
- In office 2014–2022
- Nominated by: John Mahama

Personal details
- Born: June 7, 1973 (age 52) Accra, Ghana
- Education: St Rose's Senior High School
- Alma mater: University of Ghana; Ghana School of Law
- Profession: Judge

Hafisata Amaleboba is a Ghanaian jurist who is an active Justice of the Supreme Court of Ghana. Prior to her appointment to the Supreme Court, she served as a judge of the Court of Appeal, represented the Judicial Service on the Legal Service Board of the Attorney-General’s Department, and chaired various disciplinary and administrative committees.

== Early life and education ==
Amaleboba was born on 7 June 1973 in Accra but hails from Wa in the Upper West Region of Ghana. Her education began at Jack and Jill International School, Roman Ridge, Accra and Kotoka Primary School at Burma Camp, Accra. She had her secondary education at St. Rose’s Senior High School, Akwatia, Eastern Region where she obtained her Ordinary and Advanced Level certificates. Following her secondary education, she entered the University of Ghana, Legon, where she pursued a Bachelor of Laws Degree (LLB) graduating with a Second Class Upper in 1996. She then attended the Ghana School of Law, completing her Professional Law Course and was called to the Ghana Bar in October 1998. At the time of her Supreme Court nomination, she was pursuing a Master’s of Law Degree in Data Protection and Intellectual Property Law.

== Career ==
Following her secondary education Amaleboaba did her national service as a teacher at a Junior High School prior to entering the university. After her studies at the University of Ghana, she was employed as a teaching assistant at the university’s faculty of Law after which she entered private legal practice. She began private practice at Justking and Associates at the Accra International Airport and later joined Peasah-Boadu and Company at Gulf House, Accra. In 2008, she later co-founded Amal Law Consult in Accra where she worked as its Managing Partner. In August 2014 she joined the Judicial Service of Ghana as a High Court judge, serving in the General Jurisdiction, Land Division, and Divorce and Matrimonial Causes Division (now Family Court), and also handled probate cases and judicial review applications. She also sat on a treason case alongside two other judges.

In 2022, Amaleboba was appointed Justice of the Court of Appeal by then President Nana Akufo-Addo, serving on panels in Kumasi, Accra, and Koforidua. She also represented the Judicial Service on the Legal Service Board of the Attorney-General’s Department, and chaired various disciplinary and administrative committees. From November 2020 to June 2023, she served with the Judicial Service Complaints Unit. In 2025, President John Dramani Mahama appointed her to the Supreme Court of Ghana as one of seven justices selected to address the court’s growing caseload.

== Supreme Court Appointment ==
=== Nomination ===
In 2025, Amaleboba was nominated by President John Dramani Mahama for appointment to the Supreme Court of Ghana as one of seven Court of Appeal Justices, pursuant to Article 144(2) of the 1992 Constitution of Ghana. The nomination was announced in a letter dated 29 April 2025, signed by the Executive Secretary to the President, Dr. Callistus Mahama, and addressed to Acting Chief Justice Paul Baffoe-Bonnie, requesting consideration for the appointment. The nominees, including Amaleboba, were referred to Parliament's Appointments Committee for vetting.

=== Vetting ===
On 18 June 2025, Amaleboba appeared before Parliament's Appointments Committee for her Supreme Court vetting, where she articulated her judicial philosophy and addressed issues affecting Ghana's judiciary. She expressed her aspiration to be remembered as a judge of integrity, diligence, and one whose precedents would endure across generations. Amaleboba refuted claims that Ghana's family law favoured women in divorce settlements, citing Article 22 of the 1992 Constitution to affirm that property distribution was based on equitable contribution, not gender, and recounted a case where she awarded a woman's property to a man to illustrate the law's impartiality. She attributed delays in justice delivery to a shortage of judges, insufficient manpower, and complex court procedures, particularly the misuse of interlocutory applications, and called for increased judicial capacity to address case backlogs.

Amaleboba supported capping the number of Supreme Court judges but cautioned that such a decision should follow a comprehensive review of the court's jurisdictions and backlog issues to avoid frequent constitutional amendments. She rejected suggestions that a university degree should be mandatory for Members of Parliament, arguing that representation should reflect the democratic will of the people rather than academic qualifications, while distinguishing the technical role of judges. On the issue of chiefs engaging in politics, she advised that judges who also served as chiefs should exercise restraint in political commentary to maintain neutrality. Amaleboba also dismissed concerns that the Chief Justice's prior knowledge of judges could influence their decisions, emphasizing judicial independence. She supported President Mahama's sanctions against ministers for failing to declare assets, stating that they did not usurp the Commission on Human Rights and Administrative Justice's mandate, as both entities could act independently. Additionally, she urged the Ghana Bar Association to encourage lawyers to undertake pro bono work to improve access to justice and proposed that students in missionary schools comply with institutional rules, asserting that such compliance did not infringe on their religious rights.

=== Approval ===
On 25 June 2025, Amaleboba's appointment to the Supreme Court of Ghana was confirmed by Parliament following a debate and a voice vote. The Appointments Committee's report endorsed Amaleboba and her fellow nominees; Sir. Dennis Dominic Adjei, Gbiel Simon Suurbaareh, Senyo Dzamefe, Kweku Tawiah Ackaah-Boafo, Philip Bright Mensah, and Janapare Bartels-Kodwo. The Majority supported the nominations, securing their approval, whilst the Minority caucus opposed the process, citing the suspension of the Chief Justice and alleging constitutional irregularities. Despite the Minority's objections, the Majority's backing ensured Amaleboba's confirmation, enabling her to proceed to the formal swearing-in by President John Dramani Mahama.

=== Swearing-in ===
On 3 July 2025, Amaleboba was sworn in as a Justice of the Supreme Court of Ghana by President John Dramani Mahama at the Jubilee House in Accra, alongside the six other justices. The ceremony was attended by Acting Chief Justice Paul Baffoe-Bonnie, other Supreme Court Justices, members of the Judicial Council, senior government officials, and friends and family.

== Personal life ==
Amaleboba is married with three children and a practising Christian. She was a member of the Christian Professional Fellowship (CPF), where she occasionally preaches.
