= Gbiel Simon Suurbaareh =

Ghanaian judge

Justice Gbiel Simon Suurbaareh JSC

Justice of the Supreme Court of Ghana
- Incumbent
- Assumed office 3 July 2025
- Nominated by: John Mahama

Justice of the Court of Appeal
- In office 2015 – 3 July 2025
- Nominated by: John Mahama

Justice of the High Court
- In office 2010–2015
- Nominated by: John Atta Mills

Personal details
- Born: January 11, 1958 (age 68) Ghana
- Education: St. Francis Minor Seminary; Navrongo Senior High School
- Alma mater: University of Ghana; Ghana School of Law
- Profession: Judge

Gbiel Simon Suurbaareh is a Ghanaian jurist who serves as a Justice of the Supreme Court of Ghana, having been elevated to the bench in 2025. Prior to this, he served as a Justice of the Court of Appeal and as the representative of the Court of Appeal justices on Ghana's Judicial Council. His judicial career spans multiple roles within Ghana's judicial system, including public tribunals, circuit courts, and high courts.

== Early life and education ==
Suurbaareh was born on January 11, 1958, in a town, near Nadowli, Ghana. He attended Moyiri Primary School for six years, completing Primary 6. He pursued secondary education at St. Francis Minor Seminary, obtaining his O-Level certificate in 1976, followed by A-Level studies at Navrongo Secondary School from 1976 to 1978. He then enrolled at the University of Ghana, where he earned a Bachelor of Laws (LLB) degree from 1978 to 1982. He completed his legal education at the Ghana School of Law from 1982 to 1984 and was called to the Ghana Bar in 1984.

== Career ==
Suurbaareh began his legal career with national service at the Public Tribunal in Tamale from 1984 to 1986. He continued serving in public tribunals from 1986 to 1990 in Tamale, Bolgatanga, and Wa. In 1990, he was transferred to Sunyani as the Regional Chairman of the Public Tribunal. Following Ghana's return to constitutional rule in 1992, he was integrated into the judicial system and appointed Community Tribunal Chairman in Obuasi, overseeing New Edubiase, and Bekwai. In 2000, he was promoted to the Circuit Court. He was appointed a High Court judge in 2010 and later served as the Supervising High Court Judge in the Eastern Region. In 2015, he was elevated to the Court of Appeal, where he also represented the Court of Appeal justices on Ghana's Judicial Council. In 2025, he was appointed to the Supreme Court of Ghana.

== Supreme Court appointment ==
=== Nomination ===
On 29 April 2025, Suurbaareh, was nominated by President John Dramani Mahama for to the Supreme Court of Ghana bench, alongside six other Court of Appeal justices: Justice Sir Dennis Dominic Adjei, Justice Senyo Dzamefe, Justice Kweku Tawiah Ackaah-Boafo, Justice Philip Bright Mensah, Justice Janapare Bartels-Kodwo, and Justice Hafisata Amaleboba. The nominations were made pursuant to Article 144(2) of the 1992 Constitution of Ghana, which authorizes the President to nominate Supreme Court justices with the advice of the Judicial Council and subject to parliamentary approval. The nomination was formalized in a letter signed by Callistus Mahama, Secretary to the President, addressed to the Acting Chief Justice, Justice Paul Baffoe-Bonnie.

=== Vetting ===
Suurbaareh, underwent vetting by Parliament's Appointments Committee on Monday, 16 June 2025, as part of his nomination for appointment to the Supreme Court of Ghana. He was the third and final nominee vetted that day, following Justice Senyo Dzamefe and Justice Sir Dennis Dominic Adjei, as part of a group of seven Court of Appeal justices, which also included Justice Philip Bright Mensah, Justice Janapare Adzua Bartels-Kodwo, Justice Hafisata Amaleboba, and Justice Kweku Tawiah Ackaah-Boafo. The vetting, conducted under Article 144(2) of the 1992 Constitution of Ghana, took place at 10:00 a.m. in Committee Rooms 1, 2, and 3 at the New Administration Block of Parliament.

During the vetting, Justice Suurbaareh addressed several issues. He opposed proposals to cap the number of Supreme Court justices, arguing that the 1992 Constitution's provision for a minimum of nine justices, excluding the Chief Justice, allows the appointing authority flexibility to appoint as many justices as needed based on the court's caseload. He stated that limiting appointments could lead to delays or overburden existing justices, particularly given the increasing volume and complexity of constitutional cases. On judicial corruption, he described public perceptions of widespread corruption as exaggerated, attributing some misconceptions to confusion between the judiciary (judges and magistrates) and the judicial service (administrative staff). He acknowledged instances of misconduct but stressed that they were not representative of the judiciary as a whole.

Responding to questions about judicial accountability, Justice Suurbaareh referenced the 2015 exposé by journalist Anas Aremeyaw Anas, which led to the suspension of several judges. He supported efforts to uncover misconduct but stressed the need to balance such exposés with protecting individual rights. He noted that judges are required to declare assets periodically, citing his own compliance in Kumasi the previous year. On judicial impartiality, he affirmed that judges’ allegiance lies with the Constitution, not the appointing authority or political parties.

Suurbaareh also addressed proposals for an independent body to oversee judicial appointments, questioning its effectiveness in eliminating executive influence, as the executive would likely appoint the body's members. He maintained that the existing appointment process; presidential nominations with Judicial Council advice, Council of State consultation, and parliamentary vetting, provided sufficient checks and balances. Regarding constitutional reform, he proposed extending the removal procedure for the Chief Justice to all Superior Court judges to enhance fairness and consistency, as the current system allows the Chief Justice alone to determine prima facie cases for other judges’ removal. He also advocated for the re-establishment of regional tribunals to handle specialized criminal cases, such as corruption and narcotics, to expedite justice and reduce the burden on conventional courts. Additionally, he pointed out the issue of judicial reluctance to serve in rural areas, urging the judiciary's leadership to enforce equitable staffing across all courts.

=== Approval ===
On 18 June 2025, Parliament approved the appointment of Suurbaareh to the Supreme Court of Ghana, along with six other Court of Appeal justices: Justice Sir Dennis Dominic Adjei, Justice Senyo Dzamefe, Justice Kweku Tawiah Ackaah-Boafo, Justice Philip Bright Mensah, Justice Janapare Bartels-Kodwo, and Justice Hafisata Amaleboba. The approval followed the presentation of a report by the Appointments Committee, which had vetted the nominees from 16 June to 18 June 2025, and was finalized through a plenary debate and a voice vote. The Minority caucus opposed the nominations, arguing that they were inconsistent with the recent suspension of the Chief Justice and raised constitutional concerns, asserting that the Supreme Court had failed to address breaches of natural justice. They further stated that their objections were not fully reflected in the committee's report and confirmed that all Minority members voted against the nominations. Despite this opposition, the Majority's support secured the approval of Justice Suurbaareh and the other nominees, enabling their elevation to the Supreme Court.

=== Swearing-in ===
On Thursday. 3 July 2025, Suurbaareh was sworn in as a Justice of the Supreme Court of Ghana by President John Dramani Mahama during a ceremony at the Jubilee House in Accra. Justice Suurbaareh was one of seven newly appointed justices, alongside Justices Senyo Dzamefe, Sir Dennis Dominic Adjei, Kweku Tawiah Ackaah-Boafo, Philip Bright Mensah, Janapare Bartels-Kodwo, and Hafisata Amaleboba, all elevated from the Court of Appeal. During the ceremony, President Mahama highlighted the judiciary's role in upholding democratic governance and the rule of law, urging Justice Suurbaareh and the other justices to maintain integrity, fairness, and impartiality in their duties.
