= Janapare Bartels-Kodwo =

Ghanaian judge

Justice Janapare Adzua Bartels-Kodwo JSC

Justice of the Supreme Court of Ghana
- Incumbent
- Assumed office 3 July 2025
- Nominated by: John Mahama

Justice of the Court of Appeal
- In office 17 December 2019 – 3 July 2025
- Nominated by: Nana Akuffo Addo

Justice of the High Court
- In office 2010 – 17 December 2019
- Nominated by: John Atta Mills

Personal details
- Born: November 20, 1961 (age 64) Volta Region, Ghana
- Education: Achimota School; St. Monica's Senior High School
- Alma mater: University of Cape Coast, Cape Coast
- Profession: Judge

Janapare Adzua Bartels-Kodwo is a Ghanaian jurist who is an active Justice of the Supreme Court of Ghana.

== Early life and education ==
Bartels-Kodwo was born on 20 November 1961 in the Volta Region of Ghana. She began her secondary education at Achimota School in 1973, where she obtained her GCE O-Level certificate in 1978. She then attended St. Monica's Senior High School, earning her GCE A-Level certificate in 1980. That same year, she enrolled at the University of Cape Coast, but graduated in 1985, a year later than anticipated, due to university closures during that period. While teaching at Achimota School, she pursued legal studies, qualifying as a lawyer.

== Career ==
Following her tertiary education, Bartels-Kodwo did her National Service as a teaching assistant at the same university for two years. After her National Service, she was posted to Achimota School by the Ghana Education Service where she taught for eight years. While teaching at the school, she studied to qualify as a lawyer. After obtaining her qualification, she worked at the legal department of the Ghana Internal Revenue Service (now Ghana Revenue Authority) briefly prior to joining the Judicial Service of Ghana as a Magistrate in 1997. In 2004, she was appointed a Circuit Court judge, and in 2010, she was elevated to the High Court of Ghana as a Justice. In December 2019, she became a Justice of the Court of Appeal, where she served until her appointment to the Supreme Court of Ghana in 2025.

== Supreme Court Appointment ==
=== Nomination ===
Bartels-Kodwo was nominated by President John Dramani Mahama for appointment to the Supreme Court of Ghana as one of seven Court of Appeal Justices, pursuant to Article 144(2) of the 1992 Constitution of Ghana, which authorized the President to nominate individuals for the Supreme Court, subject to the advice of the Judicial Council and parliamentary approval. The nomination was conveyed in a letter dated 27 May 2025, read by Speaker of Parliament Alban Bagbin upon Parliament's resumption, requesting expedited approval to enable the justices to assume office promptly. The nominees, including Bartels-Kodwo, were referred to the Appointments Committee for vetting.

=== Vetting ===
On 17 June 2025, Bartels-Kodwo appeared before Parliament's Appointments Committee for her Supreme Court vetting, where she addressed issues related to judicial efficiency, modernization, and professional conduct. She advocated for judges to stay updated with modern technological and societal trends, citing her experience at the Circuit Court with a case involving “revenge porn” to highlight the need for judicial adaptation to digital offenses. She emphasized continuous professional development through the Judicial Training Institute (JTI), noting the high cost of legal materials and proposing centralized access to well-stocked libraries and digital legal databases to enhance judicial efficiency. Bartels-Kodwo called for comprehensive judicial reforms, including significant infrastructure investment to support nationwide implementation of digital tools like the e-justice system, stressing that reforms should extend beyond Accra to ensure equitable access to justice.

On media freedoms, she acknowledged Ghana's strong advocacy for press freedom but expressed concerns about misreporting and sensationalism in court coverage, proposing mandatory training for judicial reporters through the Judicial Training Institute (JTI) to improve accuracy while avoiding heavy-handed regulation. Bartels-Kodwo condemned discourteous behaviour by some female judges toward young lawyers, urging them not to abandon their careers due to such treatment. She also addressed the disparity between Ghana's legal age of sexual consent (16) and marriage age (18), advocating for robust education for girls as a “natural contraceptive” to delay early family responsibilities, rather than relying solely on legislative changes. On constitutional matters, she stated that the 1992 Constitution clearly limited presidential terms to two. Additionally, Bartels-Kodwo proposed deploying freshly graduated law students to Legal Aid offices as part of their National Service to address staffing shortages and enhance access to justice for vulnerable groups.

=== Approval ===
Bartels-Kodwo's appointment to the Supreme Court of Ghana was confirmed by Parliament after a contentious debate and a voice vote. The Appointments Committee's report, which endorsed Bartels-Kodwo and her fellow nominees; Sir. Dennis Dominic Adjei, Gbiel Simon Suurbaareh, Senyo Dzamefe, Kweku Tawiah Ackaah-Boafo, Philip Bright Mensah, and Hafisata Amaleboba, cited their qualifications, judicial temperament, and adherence to constitutional values. The Majority supported the nominations, securing their approval, while the Minority caucus strongly opposed the process, citing the recent suspension of the Chief Justice and alleging constitutional irregularities. The Minority argued that the appointments aimed to influence the judiciary and claimed their objections were underrepresented in the committee's report, with all Minority members voting against the nominations. Nevertheless, the Majority's backing ensured Bartels-Kodwo's confirmation, enabling her to proceed to the formal swearing-in by President John Dramani Mahama.

=== Swearing-in ===
Bartels-Kodwo was sworn in as a Justice of the Supreme Court of Ghana by President John Dramani Mahama at the Jubilee House in Accra, alongside her colleague nominees. During the event, President Mahama urged Bartels-Kodwo and her colleagues to safeguard the spirit of the Constitution and interpret it in ways that advanced the common good and protected vulnerable populations. He emphasized the judiciary's role in nation-building, ensuring citizens’ rights, and promoting equal access to justice. The ceremony was attended by Acting Chief Justice Paul Baffoe-Bonnie, other Supreme Court Justices, Justices of the Superior Courts, members of the Judicial Council, senior government officials, and friends and family of the new justices. On behalf of the group, Justice Senyo Dzamefe expressed gratitude to the President, Parliament, Council of State, and Judicial Council, assuring the public of their commitment to dispensing justice impartially.

== Personal life ==
Bartels-Kodwo is married with three children.
