= Gertrude Torkornoo =

Ghanaian judge and author

Justice Gertrude Araba Esabaa Sackey Torkornoo

Chief Justice of Ghana
- In office 12 June 2023 – 1 September 2025
- Nominated by: Nana Akufo-Addo
- Preceded by: Kwasi Anin-Yeboah
- Succeeded by: Paul Baffoe-Bonnie

Supreme Court Judge
- In office 2019 – 1 September 2025
- Nominated by: Nana Akufo-Addo

Justice of the Appeal Court of Ghana
- In office October 2012 – December 2019
- Nominated by: John Mahama

Justice of the High Court of Ghana
- In office 14 May 2004 – October 2012
- President: John Kufour

Personal details
- Born: 11 September 1962 (age 64) Ghana
- Spouse: Kofi Torkornoo
- Education: Wesley Girls' High School; Achimota School
- Alma mater: University of Ghana; Ghana School of Law; International Institute of Social Studies; Golden Gate University School of Law

Gertrude Araba Esaaba Sackey Torkornoo (born 11 September 1962) is a Ghanaian judge who served as Chief Justice of Ghana from 2023 to 2025. She was nominated to the Supreme Court in November 2019 and received parliamentary approval in December 2019. She was sworn in on 17 December 2019. She was nominated to the office of Chief Justice in April 2023 to replace Justice Kwasi Anin-Yeboah who retired as Chief Justice on 24 May 2023. She was the 15th Chief Justice of Ghana from 12 June 2023 until her dismissal on 1 September 2025.

== Early life and education ==
Torkornoo hails from Winneba in the Central Region of Ghana. She was born on 11 September 1962 in Cape Coast to Abraham Kofi Sackey and Comfort Aba Sackey, who were both teachers at the time. She is the second of five siblings.

She attended Suhum Presby Primary School in 1966 and continued to Ajumako Catholic School in 1969, where she completed her primary education. From 1969 to 1973, she continued at Ajumako Methodist School, prior to entering Wesley Girls' High School in 1973 where she obtained her ordinary level certificate in 1978. She continued at Achimota School from 1978 to 1980 for her advanced level certificate. She gained a B. A. in Law and Sociology at University of Ghana in 1984 and graduated from the Ghana School of Law in 1986. In 2001, she obtained a Postgraduate Diploma in International Law and Organization from the International Institute of Social Studies, which is part of Erasmus University Rotterdam in the Netherlands. In 2011, she graduated from Golden Gate University School of Law, in the United States with a Master of Laws (LLM) in Intellectual Property Law.

== Career ==
Prior to joining Fugar & Co., a law firm in Accra, as an associate, Torkornoo worked as a volunteer at the FIDA Legal Aid Service and later worked there for her national service. She did an internship with Nabarro Nathanson in London. She returned to Fugar & Co. in 1994 to become a director. In January 1997, she co-founded Sozo Law Consult, where she worked as Managing Partner until 14 May 2004 when she was appointed a Justice of the High Court of Ghana. She worked as a High Court judge until October 2012 when she was elevated to the Court of Appeal. Torkornoo was nominated to the Supreme Court of Ghana in November 2019. She was sworn in on 17 December 2019.

In her work as chair of the E-Justice Committee, she led the planning of automation of all levels of courts, procurement and incorporation of the electronic resources and software in the work of the Judicial Service.

She also served as the Supervising Judge of commercial courts since 2013 where she set the agenda for and chaired the meetings and programs of the Users Committee of the Commercial Courts.

Torkornoo presided over the implementation of the Business Environment Engineering Project (BEEP) funded by the Department for International Development (DFID) of the United Kingdom. Her leadership directions in that project provided the Ministry of Trade and Industry with guidance on the introduction of Users Committees into other institutions that participated in the BEEP project. The BEEP project further influenced the active development of the Business Environment Reforms being streamlined into national institutions by the MOTI. She serves as chair of the Technical Working Group on ‘Enforcing Contracts’ set up to steer change in the business law environment. Outcomes of the work of the BEEP project within the Judiciary included the design of necessary reforms in the monitoring and evaluation of data collection currently being implemented by the Judiciary, the design of reforms in the post-judgment and execution part of justice delivery, and reforms in stream lining of ADR in commercial justice delivery in Circuit and High Courts that led to the passage of High Court (Civil Procedure) Amendment Rules 2020, CI 133.

Torkornoo served as member of the faculty and Governing Board of the Judicial Training Institute, vice chair of the Internship and Clerkship Committee of the Judiciary since 2012, member and chair of the E-Judgment Committee since 2010, member and chair of the Publications and Editorial Committee of the Association of Magistrates and Judges of Ghana since 2006. She has also been a member of the Law Reform Commission since 2016.

She was part of the seven-member panel that heard the 2020 election petition by John Mahama against The Electoral Commission of Ghana and Nana Akufo-Addo.

== Appointment as Supreme Court Judge ==
=== Nomination ===
On 12 November 2019, President Nana Akufo-Addo nominated Torkornoo together with Justices Mariama Owusu and Avril Lovelace-Johnson, then Appeal Court Judges. The announcement was made by the then Speaker of Parliament, Professor Aaron Mike Oquaye, who stated that the nominations were intended to fill the vacancies left by the retirement of two female justices; Justice Vida Akoto-Bamfo and Justice Sophia Adinyira, and the impending retirement of the then Chief Justice Sophia Akuffo.

To comply with the constitutional process, the President consulted with the Council of State by submitting the names and curricula vitae of the nominees for the Supreme Court positions. After the completion of consultations with the Council of State, the President sought the approval of Parliament for her appointment with her two other colleagues. The appointments were subject to the approval of Parliament, following the constitutional procedures outlined in Article 144 of the 1992 Constitution.

=== Vetting and Parliamentary approval ===
Gertrude Torkonoo, along with Justices Mariama Owusu and Avril Lovelace-Johnson, underwent the vetting process before the Appointments Committee of Parliament on 10 December 2019. During her vetting, Torkonoo discussed various aspects of the judicial system, highlighting the introduction of the Electronic Justice (E-Justice) System as a significant reform aimed at enhancing the administration of justice. She emphasized the importance of consolidating existing reforms before implementing further changes.

Torkonoo also informed the committee about the judiciary's deployment of a monitoring and evaluation software and stressed the need for cultural and attitudinal changes in court proceedings to drive transformative improvements. She advocated for the establishment of restrictive timelines for certain court processes to prevent abuse by litigants.

When asked about gifts received by judges, officials, and staff that could potentially be perceived as bribes, Torkonoo suggested that members of the judiciary should refrain from accepting gifts altogether, with the exception of those received from immediate family members. She emphasised the need for institutions to assess and establish similar guidelines regarding the acceptance of gifts.

Also, Torkornoo advocated for a national conversation on corruption, highlighting its broader societal impact beyond the judiciary, and emphasising the need for a comprehensive approach to address the issue.

Following the vetting process, the Appointments Committee unanimously approved the nominations of Torkonoo, Owusu and Lovelace-Johnson. The approvals were subsequently endorsed by Parliament on 13 December 2019.

=== Swearing In ===
Justice Gertrude Torkonoo, together with Justice Mariama Owusu and Justice Avril Lovelace-Johnson, were sworn into office at a ceremony presided over by President Nana Akufo-Addo on Tuesday 17 December 2019. The justices, who were elevated from the Court of Appeal, took the Oath of Allegiance, the Judicial Oath, and the Oath of Secrecy. She was then presented with her instruments of office by the President.

President Akufo-Addo urged her and her colleagues to uphold the law diligently and impartially, without any bias based on political, religious, or ethnic affiliations. He emphasised that equality before the law should be upheld, and anyone who violates the law should face appropriate consequences. The President highlighted the crucial role of the Judiciary, particularly the Supreme Court, in law enforcement and maintaining the principles of equality and justice.

The President commended the newly appointed justices for their independence, integrity, moral character, and impartiality, which he considered deserving of their high office. He noted that the Supreme Court's jurisdiction covers a wide range of legal matters, including constitutional interpretation and enforcement, civil and criminal law breaches, and safeguarding individual liberties and human rights. President Akufo-Addo stressed the importance of sound legal knowledge, precedent, and well-reasoned judgments by Supreme Court justices, emphasising that decisions should not be based solely on lower court judgments or lack proper justification.

== Appointment as Chief Justice ==
=== Nomination ===
In light of the impending retirement of the then Chief Justice Kwasi Anin-Yeboah on 24 May 2023, Torkornoo was nominated for the position of Chief Justice of Ghana by President Nana Akufo-Addo on 26 April 2023. Akufo-Addo's decision to nominate Torkornoo was made in consultation with the Judicial Council of Ghana and the Attorney General to ensure a seamless transition and avoid any vacancy in the Chief Justice role. Akufo-Addo, in a letter addressed to the Council of State, stated that Torkornoo has served on the Supreme Court for the past four years and has a total of nineteen years of experience in the judiciary, making her well-qualified for the responsibilities of the Chief Justice.

The nomination of Torkornoo as the next Chief Justice was subsequently referred to the Appointments Committee of Parliament for careful consideration and approval. This announcement was made by The First Deputy Speaker of Parliament, Joseph Osei-Owusu, following the official communication from the President to Parliament regarding the appointment of Torkornoo as Chief Justice, succeeding Kwasi Anin-Yeboah, who was scheduled to retire on 24 May 2023.

=== Vetting and Parliamentary Approval ===
Torkornoo was vetted by the Appointments Committee of Ghana on 26 May 2023 and approved by Parliament on Wednesday, 7 June 2023. During her vetting, Torkornoo addressed questions concerning emolument payments to Judges, the Ghana School of Law, demolition of Judges' Bungalows, custodial sentencing, and other relevant topics. Following the vetting, Parliament engaged in a debate on the Appointments Committee's report. Most MPs expressed their support for the committee's recommendation and subsequently voted in favour of Torkornoo's approval as Chief Justice. Parliament, through consensus, granted prior approval for Torkornoo to assume the role of Chief Justice. The Chairman of the Appointments Committee, Hon. Joseph Osei Owusu, presented the committee's report to the House, acknowledging the nominee's character, competence, and expertise in the field of law. Torkornoo also pledged to interpret the law impartially and without bias if officially appointed as Chief Justice. In accordance with Article 144(1) of the 1992 Constitution and Standing Order 172(2), the Appointments Committee thoroughly evaluated Torkornoo's nomination and addressed various questions regarding her new position as Chief Justice.

=== Swearing in ===
Torkornoo was sworn into office as the 15th Chief Justice of Ghana on 12 June 2023, by President Nana Akufo-Addo at the Jubilee House. During the swearing-in ceremony, President Akufo-Addo expressed his confidence in Torkornoo's ability to lead the Judiciary, stating that her qualities made her a suitable choice for the position. He highlighted her 19 years of experience and anticipated that it would greatly contribute to her role as the Chief Justice. The President emphasized his commitment to being a dependable and trustworthy partner to ensure a harmonious working relationship between the Executive and the Judiciary, promoting the rule of law in Ghana.

The event was attended by various dignitaries, including members of Parliament, government officials, legal practitioners, and representatives from different sectors of society. In her remarks, Torkornoo pledged to introduce technology to enhance and streamline processes within the Judiciary, aiming to bring about positive changes and restore public confidence in the institution. Torkornoo became Ghana's third female Chief Justice, following Georgina Theodora Wood and Sophia Akuffo.

=== Suspension ===
On 22 April 2025, Torkornoo was suspended as Chief Justice by President John Mahama, citing a preliminary investigation that found sufficient grounds for an inquiry into her conduct in consultation with the Council of State as provided for by Article 146 of the 1992 constitution. A five member committee was set up to review the petition in line with constitutional provisions. In view of this, the most senior judge on the Supreme Court, Paul Baffoe-Bonnie will act as Chief Justice until resolution of the issue. The reviewing committee includes two Supreme Court Justices, Gabriel Pwamang, the next most senior judge after Baffoe-Bonnie, and Samuel Kwame Adibu Asiedu. This generated controversy as the opposition cried foul-play while a government official reminded everyone that nothing had been proven against Torkornoo and that the constitutional provisions were being adhered to.

=== Dismissal ===
On 1 September 2025, following a recommendation from the Justice Pwamang committee and in accordance with Article 146(9) of the 1992 Constitution of Ghana, she was dismissed by President Mahama. Torkornoo however filed an application at the high court challenging her dismissal from office by the president

== See also ==
- List of judges of the Supreme Court of Ghana
- Supreme Court of Ghana
