= Nkenkaasu, Ghana =

Town in Ashanti Region, Ghana

Nkenkaasu
- Location in Ghana
- Coordinates: 7°19′01″N 1°54′11″W
- Country: Ghana
- Region: Ashanti Region
- District: Offinso North District

Population
  - Total: 20,000

Nkenkaasu (also known as Nkenkansu, Nkenkasu) is a town in the Offinso North District in the Ashanti Region of Ghana. It is located along the Kumasi-Techiman Highway.

== Health ==
- Nkenkaasu Government Hospital
- Paramedic and Emergency Care Training School (PECTS)

== Education ==
- Nkenkansu Community Senior High School
- Nkenkaasu Senior High School (NKESHS)
- Vocational and Technical Training Centre
- Nkenkaasu Methodist Junior High School
- Wiafe Akenten D/A School
- Enid- Hay Apostolic junior High School
- SDA Basic School
- Presbyterian Basic School
- Islamic Junior High School
- St. Joseph Catholic Junior High School
- Nana Yaa Pokua Daycare International School

== Institution ==
Brighter Tomorrow's Today, an NGO which is USA-affiliated, whose aim is to equip children with knowledge in ICT is located in Nkenkaasu.

== Notable people ==
- Dr. Fred Gyei Asamoah, Current Menber of Parliament for Offinso North Constituency (2024 - Date)
- Hon. Ceasar Ofosu Acheampong, Current District Chief Executive Officer for Offinso North District(2024 - Date )
- Augustine Collins Ntim, Formal Member of Parliament for Offinso North Constituency
