= T.I. Ahmadiyya Senior High School, Kumasi =

T.I. Ahmadiyya Senior High School
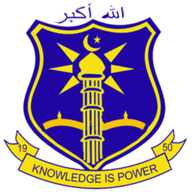

Location
- Yaa Asantewaa Road Kumasi; Ashanti Region; Ghana; 06°40′53″N 01°36′35″W

Information
- Type: Public high school
- Motto: Knowledge is Power
- Denomination: Ahmadiyya Muslim Mission, Ghana
- Established: 30 January 1950 (76 years ago)
- Status: Active
- Oversight: Ministry of Education
- Headmistress: Zainab Adams
- Gender: Mixed
- Age: 14 to 18
- Classes offered: General arts, science, visual arts, business, home economics, Agricultural science
- Website: www.realamass.edu.gh

T.I. Ahmadiyya Senior High School (Real Amass) is a coeducational second-cycle public educational institution in Kumasi in the Ashanti Region of Ghana.

== History ==
The school was established by the Ahmadiyya Muslim Mission, Ghana, on 30 January 1950.

== Programs Offered ==
- Business
- Agriculture
- Home Economics
- Visual Arts
- General Arts
- General Science.

== List of headmasters ==
Name	Designation	Tenure	Remark
Dr. S.B. Ahmed	Headmaster	1950 - 1956	Expatriate
M.N. Ahmed	Headmaster	1956 - 1963	Expatriate
M. Latif	Headmaster	1963 - 1969	Expatriate
Abdullah Nasir Boateng (aka T. A. Boateng)	Headmaster	1970 - 1981	First Ghanaian
Yusuf K. Effah	Headmaster	1981 - 1990	Ghanaian
Ibrahim K. Gyasi	Headmaster	1990 - 1999	Old Student
Yusuf K. Agyare	Headmaster	1999 - 2010	Old Student
Alhaj Yakub A. B. Abubakar	Headmaster	2010 - 2022	Old Student
Abdullah Ayyub	Headmaster	2022 -	Old Student

== Notable alumni and associates ==
- Abdul Wahab Adam – national president, Ahmadiyya Muslim Mission, Ghana
- Mohammed Ahmed Alhassan – Inspector General of Police
- Latifa Ali – Ghanaian athlete
- Georgina Opoku Amankwah, lawyer and former deputy Chairperson Electoral Commission of Ghana
- Habiba Atta Forson, football administrator, founder of Fabulous Ladies FC and GFA executive committee member
- Gyakie - Musician
- Augustine Collins Ntim – member of parliament, Parliament of Ghana (for the Offinso North parliament constituency)
- Atsu Nyamadi – Ghanaian athlete
- Sandra Owusu-Ansah – Ghanaian footballer, Ghana women's national football team
- Joshua Owusu – gold-medal recipient, 1974 British Commonwealth Games
- Mariama Owusu – Active justice of the Supreme Court of Ghana (2019–)
- Blakk Rasta (né Abubakar Ahmed) – reggae musician and radio presenter
- Strongman (rapper) - Hip Hop artist
- Diana Yankey – gold medal recipient, 1989 African Championships in Athletics and 1990 African Championships in Athletics

== See also ==
- Education in Ghana 🇬🇭
- Islam in Ghana
- List of senior high schools in the Ashanti Region
