= Ama Governor =

Ghanaian YouTuber

- Born: Ghana
- Education: Ghana School of Law
- Occupation: YouTuber

Elorm Ama Governor-Ababio (popularly known as Ama Governor) is a lawyer, owner of the Swim with Ama Swimming School, a Ghanaian YouTuber, and a social media influencer. In November 2022, she was denied the call to the Ghana Bar even though she completed the law program, passed her exams, and scaled her interview session.

== Early life and education ==
Ama was born on 22 August 1998. She attended Corpus Christi School and completed in 2013. She also completed Achimota Senior High School in 2016. She also attended and completed the University of Ghana School of Law in 2020, obtaining her L.L.B degree. Finally, she completed the Ghana School of Law in 2022 and was called to the Ghana Bar in 2024.

== Career ==
She was sworn in and called to the Ghana Bar on May 31 2024, along with 181 candidates from the Ghana School of Law at the 2024 Mini Call ceremony held at the Accra International Conference Center

== Controversy ==
In November 2022, the General Legal Council of Ghana decided to put Ama's call to Ghana's Bar on hold due to a petition that was filed against her by an unidentified Petitioner. It is stated in the petition that Ama was seen in videos and was described as having "conduct unbecoming of an applicant to be called to the Bar". Ama's call to the bar was subsequently suspended.

== Aftermath ==
Some Ghanaians on social media started an online petition against the General Legal Council. They protested the suspension of Ama's call to Ghana's Bar and called the petition "Justice for Ama Governor".

=== Criticism ===
Francis-Xavier Sosu criticized the General Legal Council for deciding not to call a 'qualified' law student to the bar due to "bad character" and that she has freedom of speech and expression in her private spaces.

=== Support ===
Ghanamanti Wayo who is a lawyer backed the decision of the General Legal Council claiming some images of Ama in her private life were 'inappropriate' and that Ama could be compromised after she becomes a judge.

Fatimatu Abubakar also claimed people faced similar fates in previous years due to law students' failure to show character expected of them.

Lawyer Moses Foh-Amoaning, also claimed he is in support of the decision of the General Legal Council.

Haruna Amaliba, a member of the National Democratic Congress also claimed to support the decision of the General Legal Council.
