= General Legal Council =

Legal institution in Ghana

Agency overview
- Formed: 1960
- Jurisdiction: Government of Ghana
- Headquarters: Accra, Ghana; 05°32′46″N 00°12′21″W
- Minister responsible: Godfred Dame, Attorney General and Minister for Justice
- Agency executive: Getrude Asaaba Araba Torkonoo, Chief Justice of Ghana
- Website: glc.gov.gh

The General Legal Council is the body that regulates the Legal Profession in Ghana. It was set up in 1960 by an act of parliament, The Legal Profession Act, 1960 (Act 32). Its role was to oversee legal education and the legal profession in the country.

== Members of the Council ==
The membership of the Council includes academics, judges and legal practitioners representing legal education, training and practice. The Chief Justice of Ghana currently in office is the chairperson for the council. The council also includes the three most senior members of the Supreme Court of Ghana; the Attorney General of Ghana and his or her nominee; and the President, Vice President, and secretary of the Ghana Bar Association.

Members of the General Legal Council
Position	Name	Office	Start Date
Chairperson	Kwasi Anin-Yeboah	Chief Justice of Ghana	7 January 2020
Member	Julius Ansah	Supreme Court Judge	
Member	Jones Dotse	Supreme Court Judge	January 2020
Member	Paul Baffoe-Bonnie	Supreme Court Judge	
Member	Gloria Akuffo	Attorney General of Ghana	January 2017
Member	Joseph Dindiok Kpemka	Deputy Attorney General	
Member	Raymond Atuguba	Director, Ghana School of Law	
Member	Anthony Forson	Ghana Bar Association President	September 2018
Member	William Orleans Oduro	Ghana Bar Association Vice President	
Member	Peter Kornor	Legal practitioner	
Member	Justin Amenuvor	Legal practitioner	
In attendance
Position	Name	Office	Start Date
Secretary	Cynthia Pamela Akotoaa Addo	Judicial Secretary	2 October 2018
In attendance	Kwasi Prempeh-Eck	Director of Legal Education and Ghana School of Law	
In attendance	Lydia Nkansah	Dean, Faculty of Law Kwame Nkrumah University of Science and Technology	
In attendance	Kofi Abotsi	Dean, Faculty of Law, Ghana Institute of Management and Public Administration	
In attendance	Stephen Offei	Dean, Faculty of Law, Wisconsin University College	
In attendance	Franklina Gesila Adanu	Counsel, General Legal Counsel	

== Functions ==
The council maintains licences lawyers to practice. It also enrolls new members to the Ghana Bar during the first week of every October. It has a Disciplinary Committee which is able to sanction and disbar legal practitioners in the country.
