= Elsie Appau-Klu =

Ghanaian lawyer

Elsie Appau-Klu is a Ghanaian lawyer, human resources practitioner, policy analyst, gender rights advocate, and entrepreneur. She is the managing director of Acreaty Ghana Limited and serves as the Africa Regional Representative of Acreaty Management Plc. She is also the President of the Women's Economic Forum, an organization that promotes women's economic development and small and medium-sized enterprises (SMEs).

== Early life and education ==
Appau-Klu was born in Sokode-Bagble in the Volta Region. She later pursued higher education in Ghana and abroad.

She holds a Bachelor of Education from the University of Cape Coast, a Bachelor of Laws (LLB) from the Ghana Institute of Management and Public Administration, and a Qualifying Law Certificate from the Ghana School of Law. She also obtained a Master of Laws (LLM) from the University of Ghana.

Additionally, she holds a Postgraduate Diploma in Public-Private Partnerships and a Postgraduate Diploma in Sustainable Governance from IHE Delft Institute for Water Education (formerly UNESCO-IHE). She also earned diplomas in Leadership from the University of Cape Town Graduate School of Business and in Sustainability and Business Growth from Stockholm University.

== Career ==
Appau-Klu began her professional career in development policy and governance, working with the Ministry of Foreign Affairs of the Netherlands. She served as a Policy Analyst focusing on governance, gender equality, water governance, and sanitation. She later became Business Advisor for West Africa, advising on bilateral development programmes between the governments of Netherlands and Ghana.

During her tenure, she was involved in managing and supporting several development programmes, including the MDG3 Fund, the Ghana WASH Window, the Ghana Netherlands WASH Programme, the ORIO Programme, and the Natural Resources and Environmental Governance Programme.

As a private legal practitioner, Appau-Klu specializes in commercial law, with a focus on aviation, real estate, environmental regulation, and finance.

She later joined Acreaty, a multinational human resources consultancy, where she became managing director of Acreaty Ghana Limited and the Africa Regional Representative for the company.

In addition to her corporate leadership roles, she serves on the boards of several companies and non-governmental organizations, providing strategic guidance on governance and business development. She has also trained numerous entrepreneurs and small business owners in business sustainability, SME management, and youth development.

== Professional affiliations ==
Appau-Klu is a member of several professional organizations, including:

- International Bar Association
- Ghana Bar Association
- Association of Ghana Industries
- Institute of Human Resource Management Practitioners
- Society for Human Resource Management

She also serves as executive director of Corporate Affairs for the African Women Lawyers Association Ghana.

== Awards and recognition ==
Appau-Klu has received several awards for leadership and professional achievement, including:

- 2024 Ghana's Most Respected CEO (Human Resources Consultancy)
- 2024 Social Impact Recognition Award – Global Entrepreneurship Initiative, Nigeria
- 2019–2020 Jack Brewer Fellow (United States)
- 2019 Top 50 Young CEOs in Ghana
- 2019 50 Most Influential Young Ghanaians
- 2018 African Achievers Awards (United Kingdom)
- 2017 40 Under Forty Achievers Awards (Ghana)
- 2016 Best Employee – Netherlands Foreign Affairs Ministry
- 2010 Best Employee Making an Impact – Netherlands Embassy
- 2007 Youth-Led Development Achiever – Liberia

== Business and advocacy ==
Beyond her legal and corporate work, Appau-Klu is involved in entrepreneurship and business development, with interests in real estate, fashion, retail, hospitality, events management, and consultancy. She also contributes to policy discussions and co-chairs Ghana's Business Regulatory Reforms Programme under the Ministry of Trade and Industry Ghana.
