= Kwasi Baffoe-Bonnie =

Ghanaian media executive (1950–2021)

- Born: Kwasi Sainti Baffoe-Bonnie; 1950; Western North Region, Ghana
- Died: 1 February 2021 (aged 70–71); Accra, Ghana
- Citizenship: Ghana
- Education: University of Cape Coast; Ohio University
- Occupation: Business executive
- Known for: Founder of Radio Gold
- Political party: National Democratic Congress
- Children: 3
- Relatives: Paul Baffoe-Bonnie (brother)

Kwasi Sainti Baffoe-Bonnie (1950 – 1 February 2021) was a Ghanaian media administrator and politician. He was the founder and CEO of Network Broadcasting Company Limited which served as a mother company for Radio Gold.

== Early life and education ==
Baffoe-Bonnie was born in 1950 in the Western North region of Ghana. He studied at the University of Cape Coast (UCC) where he graduated with a Bachelor of Arts degree (Hons) Ed in History in 1978/79. In 1980/81, he further had his Master of Arts degree in International Affairs from Ohio University in Athens, U.S.

== Career ==
Baffoe-Bonnie established the Network Broadcasting Company Limited which runs Radio Gold, TV Gold and Montie FM where he was the CEO from 1995 to 2008. He was the board chairman of Ghana Air Catering Services from 2006 to 2007.

== Politics ==
Baffoe-Bonnie was a member of the National Democratic Congress. He served as a Senior Political Advisor to the then Vice President of the Republic of Ghana; John Dramani Mahama, from 2009 to 2012. From 2012 to 2016, Baffoe-Bonnie also served as a Presidential Staffer and Senior Advisor on Political Affairs to John Dramani Mahama when he was the President of the Republic of Ghana.

== Personal life ==
He was married, with three children (Ama Aniwaa Baffoe-Bonnie, Kweku Agyeman Baffoe-Bonnie, and Kwaku Amoa Baffoe-Bonnie). His brother is Supreme Court Judge Paul Baffoe-Bonnie.

== Death ==
He died on 1 February 2021 in Accra. According to some reports, the cause of his death was unknown, but other reports also claimed he died after battling a short illness. Other reports indicated he died after contracting COVID-19.
