= Patience Baffoe-Bonnie =

Director-General of the Ghana Prisons Service

Director-General of the Ghana Prisons Service
- Incumbent
- Assumed office 17 March 2025
- President: John Dramani Mahama
- Preceded by: Isaac Kofi Egyir

Personal details
- Spouse: Paul Baffoe-Bonnie
- Education: University of Ghana, Legon; Ghana School of Law
- Occupation: Corrections and security expert
- Awards: Female Pillar of Modern Public Service Award; HD LeadHERS Xperience Award (2023); Ghana Women’s Award (2013)

Patience Baffoe-Bonnie is a Ghanaian corrections and security expert who currently serves as the Director-General of the Ghana Prisons Service.

== Early life and education ==
Baffoe-Bonnie began her education at Nana Osae Djan Experimental Primary School in Nsawam and continued at Winneba Secondary School and Tema Secondary School. She earned a Bachelor of Arts degree in Sociology with Social Work from the University of Ghana, Legon and a Barrister-at-Law and Qualifying Certificate from the Ghana School of Law and was called to the bar in 2006.

== Career ==
Baffoe-Bonnie joined the Ghana Prisons Service in 1987 as a junior officer with an Advanced Level Certificate. She was admitted into the Senior Officer Corps in 1994 after completing cadet training. On 6 February 2024, she was promoted to the rank of Deputy Director-General of Prisons. Throughout her career, she has served in a wide range of positions, including:

- Chief Legal Officer
- Director of Prisons Health, Technical & Services
- Director of Services
- Director of Operations
- Deputy Director-General (Finance and Administration)

She has also held various command and instructional roles such as Adjutant, Course Commander, Classroom Instructor, and Officer-In-Charge.

As Chief Legal Officer, Baffoe-Bonnie helped review the Ghana Prisons Service and Parole Bills and supported the passage of regulations concerning general administration and discipline. At James Camp Prisons, she initiated reforms in reformation, rehabilitation, and reintegration, transforming the facility into a model institution.

During the COVID-19 pandemic, she led the service's health response as Acting Director of Health. She secured support from international agencies, advocated for judicial reforms to reduce prison overcrowding, and implemented policies that contributed to a zero-death outcome among inmates during the crisis.

Her leadership has introduced organic farming, vocational training, and creative arts into correctional programming, while also advancing income-generating initiatives and staff development efforts.

== Director-General of Prisons ==
On 14 March 2025, President John Dramani Mahama appointed Baffoe-Bonnie as the Director-General of Prisons, making her the second woman in Ghana's history to hold the position. She succeeded Isaac Kofi Egyir, who was appointed in 2021 by President Nana Addo Dankwa Akufo-Addo. She was officially sworn into office on 17 March 2025 at the Jubilee House.

== International engagement ==
Baffoe-Bonnie has completed training programmes in international criminal law, corporate governance, and strategic leadership, including sessions in the United Kingdom. She has also contributed to peacekeeping and capacity building as a planner and mentor with the United Nations Mission in Liberia in 2003.

== Personal life ==
She is married to Paul Baffoe-Bonnie with children. Her hobbies include painting, basketball, cooking, dancing, travelling, and spending time with children. She is actively involved in several national and international organisations. She is a member of the Ghana Olympic Committee Women’s Commission, the Women and Children Committee of the Ghana Bar Association, and the African Union Women Election Observer Group. She also serves as the National President of the Prisons Ladies Association (PRILAS).

== Awards ==
Her dedication has earned her several awards, including the Female Pillar of Modern Ghana Award (2023), HD LeadHERS Xperience Award – Exceptional Award for Women in Leadership (2023), Chewa Award (2023), and Ghana Women’s Award – Outstanding Female Prisons Officer (2013).

== See also ==
- Ghana Prisons Service
- Ministry of Interior (Ghana)
