= Fred Kyei Asamoah =

Ghanaian politician

Hon. Fred Kyei Asamoah MP

Member of the Ghana Parliament for Offinso North
- Incumbent
- Assumed office 7 January 2025
- Preceded by: Augustine Collins Ntim
- President: John Dramani Mahama
- Vice President: Jane Naana Opoku-Agyemang

Personal details
- Born: 19 November 1977 (age 48) Akumadan, Ashanti Region, Ghana
- Party: New Patriotic Party
- Education: Kwame Nkrumah University of Science and Technology; University of Colorado, Denver; University of North Carolina at Pembroke
- Occupation: Politician
- Profession: Pharmacist

Fred Kyei Asamoah (born November 19, 1977) is a Ghanaian pharmacist and politician who serves as the Member of Parliament for the Offinso North Constituency in the Ashanti Region. He represents the New Patriotic Party (NPP) and is a member of the Ninth Parliament of the Fourth Republic of Ghana.

== Early life and education ==
Fred Kyei is a Christian and was born on Saturday, 19 November 1977. He hails from Akuma dan in the Ashanti Region. He went to Kwame Nkrumah University of Science and Technology to pursue a Bachelor of Pharmacy in 2002. He therefore moved to University of Colorado, Denver, CO, USA for a Doctor of Pharmacy in 2015. He again moved to University of North Carolina, Pembroke, NC, USA for Master of Business Administration in 2022.

== Early life and education ==
Asamoah was born on November 19, 1977, in Akumadan, Ashanti Region. He earned a Bachelor of Pharmacy from Kwame Nkrumah University of Science and Technology (KNUST) in June 2002. He then pursued higher education in the U.S., earning a Doctor of Pharmacy (Pharm.D.) from the University of Colorado, Denver in May 2015, and a Master of Business Administration (MBA) from University of North Carolina at Pembroke in May 2022.

== Career ==
Asamoah held the position of executive director (later Director General) of the Commission for Technical and Vocational Education and Training (CTVET).

=== Politics ===
In January 2024, Asamoah contested and won the NPP primaries, defeating the incumbent Augustine Collins Ntim to become the parliamentary candidate for Offinso North. He was subsequently elected MP in the December 2024 general election.
