= Emmanuel Senyo Amedahe =

Ghanaian judge

Emmanuel Senyo Amedahe is a Ghanaian judge who serves as a Justice of the Court of Appeal of Ghana. Before his elevation to the Court of Appeal in 2025, he served as a judge of the High Court of Ghana, Including at the High Court in Koforidua. He has presided over a number of civil, land, commercial, and constitutional matters during his judicial career.

== Judicial career ==
Amedahe was serving as a judge of the High Court by at least 2015–2016. The Judicial Service of Ghana's annual report listed him as a justice of the High Court assigned to High Court 1 in Kumasi. The Judicial Service's 2017–2018 annual report similarly listed him among the Justices of the High Court and again recorded his assignment to High Court 1 in Kumasi.

He later served the Koforidua High Court, where a number of judgements issued in his name are available through the Ghana Legal Information Institute. These include decisions concerning land and property disputes and other civil matters. The General Legal Council of Ghana has also listed Amedahe among Ghana's judges, with an earlier posting recorded as the Circuit Court, Tamale.

== High Court proceedings ==
During his time at the High Court in Koforidua, Amedahe presided over cases involving land ownership, family property, and other civil disputes. For example, judgements delivered in 2023 and 2024 identify him as the presiding judge in cases before the High Court in Koforidua.

His name also became prominent in 2025 in connection with the proceedings arising from the Akwatia parliamentary election dispute In February 2025, Amedahe, sitting at the Koforidua High Court, dealt with proceedings involving Ernest Yaw Kumi, the Member of Parliament for Akwatia. The proceedings included an interim Injunction and subsequent contempt ruling.

The matter was subsequently taken to the Supreme Court of Ghana. In June 2025, the Supreme Court, by a majority decision, quashed the contempt conviction and prohibited further proceedings against Kumi in relations to the matter before Amedahe. The Supreme Court's decision is recorded in the Ghana Legal Information Institute.

The Supreme Court proceedings concerned the jurisdiction of the High Court in relation to the parliamentary election petition and procedural requirements surrounding the publication if election results. Reporting on the case described the Supreme Court decision as a 4–1 majority ruling.

== Elevation to the Court of Appeal ==
In 2025 Amedahe was among a group of High Court judges elevated to the Court of Appeal of Ghana. President John Dramani Mahama swore in 21 new Justices of the Court of Appeal on the 2 October 2025. Amedahe was one of the 20 High Court Judges among the appointees, with the remaining appointee being a private legal practitioner. The Judicial Service of Ghana lists him among the Justices of the Court of Appeal.

His elevation was made under Article 144(3) of the Constitution of Ghana, which provides for the appointment of Justices of the Court of Appeal. As a Justice of the Court of Appeal, Amedahe forms part of Ghana's intermediate appellate court, which hears appeals from the High Court and other courts and performs other functions provided for by the Ghanaian law.

== Notable appellate proceedings ==
Following his appointment to the Court of Appeal, Amedahe has participated in appellate panels hearing significant cases.

In July 2026, he was part of a three-member Court of Appeal panel unanimously acquitted and discharged Sedina Christine Tamakloe-Attionu, a former chief executive officer of the Microfinance and Small Loans Centre (MASLOC), after overturning her conviction and 10-year sentence on corruption-related charges. The panel was presided over by Justice Emmanuel Ankamah, with Amedahe and Justice Samuel Obeng-Diawuo serving as members. The Court of Appeal held that the prosecution had failed to prove several of the charges beyond reasonable doubt and found the trial process improperly shifted the burden of proof onto the accused.

He has also participated in appellate concerning civil liability. In a case involving Marwako Fast Food Ltd., the Court of Appeal considered an appeal arising from a food-poisoning claim and issues concerning negligence, evidence and damages. Amedahe was identified as a member of the appellate panel in reporting on this decision.
