= Philip Bright Mensah =

Ghanaian judge

Justice Bright Philip Mensah JSC

Justice of the Supreme Court of Ghana
- In office 3 July 2025 – 12 February 2026
- Nominated by: John Mahama

Justice of the Court of Appeal
- In office 17 December 2019 – 3 July 2025
- Nominated by: Nana Akuffo Addo

Personal details
- Born: Amosima, Ghana
- Education: Commercial Service Institute, Cape Coast
- Profession: Judge

Philip Bright Mensah is a Ghanaian jurist who is an active justice of the Supreme Court of Ghana.

== Early life and education ==
Mensah was born in Amosima in the Central Region of Ghana. He attended Amosima Methodist Primary School from 1960 to 1966, followed by Amosma D.A. Middle School from 1966 to 1970. He continued his education at the Commercial Service Institute in Cape Coast, where he completed a course that qualified him for engagement by the judicial service.

== Career ==
Mensah began his professional career as a lawyer, practicing with the Legal Relief Trust, where he specialized in Commercial Law, Corporate Law, Litigation, and Taxation. He joined the judicial service in 1977 as a court recorder. He was promoted to assistant registrar, serving in this capacity from 1979 to 1983. Between 1991 and 1997, he held the position of regional administrative officer, and in 1997, he was elevated to deputy chief registrar. Mensah later served as a justice of the High Court until 2019, when he was sworn in as a justice of the Court of Appeal.

During his tenure on the Court of Appeal, Mensah presided over cases, including the trial of Dr. Stephen Kwabena Opuni, former CEO of COCOBOD. In this case, he ruled that the High Court should adopt the proceedings from the trial conducted by the previous judge, spanning from 2018 to March 2023, rather than initiating a fresh retrial. Additionally, Mensah was one of the Court of Appeal judges in the ambulance trial, where he acquitted and discharged Finance Minister Dr. Cassiel Ato Forson and businessman Richard Jakpa after the state withdrew all charges. In 2025, he was appointed justice of the Supreme Court of Ghana as part of a group of seven justices nominated by President John Dramani Mahama.

== Supreme Court appointment ==
=== Nomination ===
In 2025, Mensah was nominated by President John Dramani Mahama for appointment to the Supreme Court of Ghana as one of seven Court of Appeal justices, pursuant to Article 144(2) of the 1992 Constitution of Ghana, which authorized the president to nominate individuals for the Supreme Court, subject to the advice of the Judicial Council and parliamentary approval. The nomination was announced in a letter dated 27 May 2025, read by Speaker of Parliament Alban Bagbin upon Parliament's resumption, urging expedited approval to enable the justices to assume office promptly. The nominees, including Mensah, were referred to the Appointments Committee for vetting.

=== Vetting ===
On 17 June 2025, Mensah appeared before Parliament's Appointments Committee for his Supreme Court vetting, where he addressed a range of issues concerning judicial administration, efficiency, and ethics. He advocated for increasing the number of Supreme Court justices to 20, citing a backlog of 595 cases pending as of June 2023, as reported by the Judicial Service. Mensah emphasized that any decision to cap or expand the court's size, as permitted under the 1992 Constitution, should involve extensive consultation with stakeholders, including lawyers, the Ghana Bar Association, constitutional experts, academia, and political parties, to build consensus. He highlighted the growing caseload driven by citizens’ rights to appeal, noting that ordinary cases require a five-judge panel and significant cases a seven-judge panel, necessitating a larger judicial complement for efficient justice delivery.

Mensah proposed significant judicial reforms, including the full digitization of the judicial system to enable electronic case filing and virtual court proceedings, drawing on successful models from Kenya and Tanzania. He argued that such systems would enhance transparency, reduce delays, and ensure expeditious case resolution. He also called for retaining 50% to 70% of the judiciary's Internally Generated Funds (IGF) to enhance operational efficiency, while acknowledging legal requirements for funds to be deposited into the consolidated fund. Mensah urged Parliament to approve the judiciary's full budgetary requests to support infrastructure development, such as courthouses and judicial residences, to create a conducive working environment. He opposed raising the judicial retirement age from 70 to 75, citing the intense workload and stress of Supreme Court duties, and emphasized that the current age limit balanced public service with personal well-being.

Addressing judicial conduct, Mensah emphasized the need for judges to withdraw from social circles to maintain public trust and avoid suspicion of bias, emphasizing that justice must be seen to be done. He advocated reforming Ghana's jury system, inherited from British colonial rule, proposing its replacement with an assessor system comprising three legally trained judges to improve decision quality and reduce inconsistencies. Mensah also supported allowing career magistrates to enter Law School for professional upgrades rather than scrapping the program, to maintain judicial capacity in underserved areas. On the issue of illegal mining (“galamsey”), particularly involving foreign nationals, he proposed training judges in the Chinese language to overcome language barriers in prosecutions, citing challenges with interpreter reliability, and stressed the effective implementation of existing mining laws to curb environmental damage. Regarding the legal age of sexual consent, Mensah defended maintaining it at 16, distinguishing it from the marriage age of 18, arguing that expecting abstinence until 18 was unrealistic and posed a moral dilemma. He also called for improved conditions of service for lower court judges to attract qualified lawyers, noting their critical role in handling the bulk of judicial work.

=== Approval ===
Mensah's appointment to the Supreme Court of Ghana was approved by Parliament on 25 June 2025, following a plenary debate and a decisive voice vote. The approval process followed the presentation of the Appointments Committee's final report, which affirmed that Mensah and the other six nominees; Sir. Dennis Dominic Adjei, Gbiel Simon Suurbaareh, Senyo Dzamefe, Kweku Tawiah Ackaah-Boafo, Janapare Bartels-Kodwo, and Hafisata Amaleboba, possessed the requisite qualifications, judicial temperament, and commitment to constitutional values expected of Supreme Court justices. The Majority endorsed the nominations, securing their approval despite opposition from the Minority caucus. The Minority, expressing concerns over the recent suspension of the Chief Justice and perceived constitutional breaches, argued that the appointments represented an attempt to undermine natural justice and that their objections were not adequately captured in the committee's report. All Minority members voted against the nominations, but the Majority's support ensured Mensah's confirmation.

=== Swearing-in ===
On 3 July 2025, Mensah was sworn in as a justice of the Supreme Court of Ghana by President John Dramani Mahama at the Jubilee House, alongside the six other justices. The ceremony, conducted in accordance with Article 144 of the 1992 Constitution, followed his vetting by the Appointments Committee of Parliament and his approval by Parliament.

== Personal life ==
Mensah is married with four children.
