= Afia Kobi Ampem Senior High School =

Public high school in Trabuom, Ashanti, Ghana

Afia Kobi Ampem Girls' Senior High School

Location
- Trabuom; Ashanti Region; Trabuom, Ghana, Ashanti +233; Ghana
- 6.615920°N 1.769106°W

Information
- Type: Public High School
- Motto: Royals! virtuous ladies of class
- Established: October 27, 1975
- Status: active
- School district: Atwima Kwanwoma
- Oversight: Ministry of Education
- Administrator: Abigail Efe Mensah
- Headmistress: EMELIA AMEFLU DENUTSUI
- Chaplain: Francis Nyimbo
- Gender: Girls
- Age range: 14-19
- Enrollment: 3000
- Average class size: 45
- Classes offered: Home Economics, General Science, General Arts, visual Arts, Business
- Language: English
- Houses: Mary Singletary, Alan Cole, Ntiamoah, Sir Justice, Acheampong, Owusu
- Colours: White and sea blue
- Nickname: Owoahene
- Alumni: AKAGSHS Old students Association

Afia Kobi Ampem Senior High School (formerly Trabuom Secondary School and Atwimaman Secondary School) is an all female high school in Trabuom in the Ashanti Region

== History ==
The school was established on 27 October 1975 as Trabuom Secondary School and later Atwimaman Secondary School. The school was changed to a female school and its name changed to Afia Kobi Ampem Senior High School in the 2002/2003 academic year.
