= Montie FM =

Accra, Ghana; Ghana
- Frequency: 101.1 MHz

Ownership
- Sister stations: Radio Gold

Montie FM is a private FM radio station broadcasting from Accra, Ghana. In August 2016, Montie Fm was involved in a criminal contempt suit with the Supreme Court of Ghana.

== Ownership ==
It is owned by Network Broadcasting Company Limited although its operating frequency of 101.1 was set up by Harry Zakour of Zeze Media as a propaganda tool for the National Democratic Congress political party. Its board of directors are Ato Ahwoi (brother of Kwesi Ahwoi), Edward Addo, Kwasi Kyei Darwkah, and Kwesi Bram Addo.
