= 2016 Ghanaian presidential pardon of contemnors =

In August 2016, Ghana's president John Dramani Mahama exercised his prerogative of mercy to grant remission to three persons found guilty on charges of contempt by the Supreme Court of Ghana.

== Background ==
On July 8, 2016 the Supreme Court of Ghana issued a Writ of summons signed by Chief Justice Georgina Theodora Wood to owners of Accra-based Montie FM and political radio talk show host Salifu Maase (also called Mugabe) together with two panelists Alistair Tairo Nelson and Godwin Ako Gunn on grounds of contempt for comments the three persons made on the radio station on June 29, 2016.
