= B. J. Da Rocha =

Ghanaian politician

Bernard Joao Da Rocha

Personal details
- Born: 16 May 1927 Cape Coast
- Died: 23 February 2010 (aged 82)
- Citizenship: Ghanaian
- Known for: New Patriotic Party Founding member

Bernard Joao da Rocha (16 May 1927 – 23 February 2010) was a founding member and the first National Chairman of the New Patriotic Party. He was also the first Ghanaian Director of the Ghana School of Law.

== Education ==
B. J. Da Rocha was born in Cape Coast, Ghana, where he had his secondary education at Adisadel College.

== Career ==
He lectured at the Ghana School of Law for almost two decades before retiring in 1992 as the first Ghanaian Legal Director of Education. He also served as the General Secretary of the Progress Party led by Kofi Abrefa Busia.

== Honor ==
In 1993, the Ghana Bar Association honored da Rocha for his contribution to the legal profession.

== Legacy ==
Mountcrest University College in Ghana has instituted a lecture and a chair in Law and Politics in Da Rocha's memory and honour in recognition to his contribution to the legal fraternity in Ghana.

== Death ==
B.J.Da Rocha died on 23 February 2010.
