= Asubima Forest Reserve =

Forest reserve in Ghana

- IUCN category VI (protected area with sustainable use of natural resources)
- Location within Ghana
- Location: Ghana
- Nearest city: Akumadan, Ghana
- Coordinates: 7°24.812′N 1°53.244′W
- Area: 7,870 hectares (19,400 acres)
- Established: 1945

The Asubima Forest Reserve is a 7,870-hectare (19,400-acre) protected area near Akumadan, Ghana and was established in 1945. FORM Ghana, a plantation development company, manages 1,729.9 hectares (4,275 acres) of the southern part of the reserve to reforest land in the reserve that has been highly degraded due to logging, wildfires, and illegal farming. The reserve is located at the northern edge of the semi-deciduous forest ecological zone, which is characterized by alternating wet and dry seasons in a tropical monsoon climate.

Located 9 kilometers east of Akumadan in Ghana, in the Ashanti region, the Asubima Forest Reserve is a forest area aimed at preserving Ghanaian tree species. The reserve includes programs such as high-quality nurseries, model plantations and intervention programs that work against deforestation, deforestation, wood fires and illegal agriculture. Local farmers participate in the programs, working on plantations as workers, guards or members of the fire brigade.
