= Akumadan Senior High School =

Location
- Akumadan, Ashanti Region; Ghana; 7.3989439°N 1.9457639°W

Information
- Type: Public high school
- Motto: Fight To Conquer
- Established: 1976
- Status: Active
- Gender: Co-educational
- Age: 14 to 18
- Houses: 5
- Colour: Sea Blue
- Slogan: Nkunimdifuo
- Nickname: Akuss

Akumadan Senior High School is a second-cycle institution in Akumadan in the Ashanti Region of Ghana.

== History ==
The school was established in 1976. It is located at Akumadan in the Offinso North District of Ashanti Region and can be found on the left side of the road when coming from Kumasi to Techiman. The traditional colour of the school is sea blue.

== See also ==
- Education in Ghana
- List of senior high schools in the Ashanti Region
