= Mariama Owusu =

Ghanaian judge

Justice Mariama Owusu

Justice of the Supreme Court of Ghana
- In office December 2019 – November 2024
- Nominated by: Nana Akufo-Addo

Appeal Court Judge
- In office 22 November 2006 – December 2019
- Nominated by: John Kufuor

High Court Judge
- In office 2000 – 22 November 2006
- Nominated by: Jerry Rawlings

Personal details
- Born: November 18, 1954 (age 71) Ghana
- Education: T.I. Ahmadiyya Secondary School, Kumasi
- Alma mater: University of Ghana; Ghana School of Law
- Occupation: Judge
- Profession: Lawyer; Judge

Mariama Owusu is a Ghanaian judge. She has been on the bench since 1990 and was nominated as a Supreme Court Judge in November 2019. She was sworn in on 17 December 2019 after gaining parliamentary approval.

== Early life and education ==
Owusu was born on 18 November 1954. She was born in Daloa but hails from Beposo in the Ashanti Region of Ghana. She received her primary and middle school education at Asawase L/A Primary and Middle School, completing it in 1968. She continued her studies at T.I. Ahmadiyya Senior High School from 1968 to 1975, earning both her Ordinary and Advanced Level certificates. In 1976, she enrolled at the University of Ghana to study law, and later attended the Ghana School of Law in 1980, where she was called to the Ghana Bar Association in November 1981.

== Career ==
Owusu began her legal career as a National Service person at the Attorney General's Office in Kumasi from 1980 to 1982. She later worked in private practice with Messrs Totoe Legal Services in Kumasi from 1984 to 1990. She began serving on the bench as a District Magistrate from 1990 to 1992. She became a Circuit Court judge in 1992 and served in that capacity until 2000 when she was made a High Court judge. She served at various locations, including Kumasi, Sunyani, and Tema. In 2003, she was appointed as the supervising High Court judge for Sunyani until 2005. She remained a High Court judge until 2006 when she was appointed a Justice of the Court of Appeal. She had been a justice of the Court of Appeal until her nomination for the role of Supreme Court Judge in November 2019. She was sworn into office on 17 December 2019.

Owusu was appointed the President of the International Association of Women Judges (Ghana Chapter) in 2014, and she served in this position until 2016. She also served as a member of the Ethics Committee from 2012 to 2013 and as a member of the Performing Access Committee of the Judicial Service.

She was part of a seven-member panel that did the hearing of the 2020 election petition by John Mahama against The Electoral Commission of Ghana and Nana Akufo-Addo.

== See also ==
- List of judges of the Supreme Court of Ghana
- Supreme Court of Ghana
