= Akumadan =

- District Capital
- Location in Ghana
- Coordinates: 7°24′N 1°57′W
- Country: Ghana
- Region: Ashanti Region
- District: Offinso North District
- Elevation: 1,276 ft (389 m)

Akumadan is the capital of Offinso North, a district in the Ashanti Region of Ghana. It has a population of about 20000. Akumadan township is well known for its agricultural activities. All sorts of food crops can be planted on its soil but tomatoes is the largest crop. 90 percent of natives above 18 years are tomato farmers. They produce more tomatoes than any other town in Ghana. It has a dam that helps to irrigate some farmlands within its reach during dry seasons. Cassava, pepper, onion, garden eggs, plantain, maize etc. are also abundant. A company called Fomghana has acquired a large area of land for planting trees near a river that irrigates it. Recently, the President Nana Addo Dankwa Akuffo-Addo formally opened a Greenhouse project. Its poised to train young people in Agric Technology.

The town is known for the Akumadan Senior High School, a second cycle institution.

The Akumadan EduSpots also provide a library space for both children and adults, along with running Science, Technology, Engineering and Mathematics (STEM) as well as Literacy clubs.

The Asubima Forest Reserve is about 9 kilometres (5.6 mi) east of Akumadan.

Akumadan has many investment opportunities the field of Agriculture and Real Estate.
