= St. Augustine's Senior High School (Bogoso) =

Public Senior High School in Bogoso, Ghana

Coordinates: 5.5657°N 2.0076°W

St. Augustine's Senior High

Location
- P. O. Box 33; Bogoso; Ghana

Information
- Type: Public High School
- Established: 1957; 69 years ago
- Colors: Green and yellow
- Athletics: Track and field
- Nickname: Augusco
- Affiliations: Roman Catholic
- Alumni: Bogoso St. Augustine’s School Past Students Association (BAPSA)
- Website: augusco.myonlineadmission.com

St. Augustine’s Senior High is a mixed-gender public secondary school located in Bogoso, Western Region of Ghana. Established in 1957, it originated as the teacher training section of St. Augustine’s College, Cape Coast, before being relocated and converted into a secondary school under the Catholic Church’s directive.

== History ==
St. Augustine’s Senior High School in Bogoso, Ghana, originated as part of St. Augustine’s College in Cape Coast. In 1957, the Catholic Church relocated the Teacher Training section to Bogoso, establishing it as an independent institution. By 1973, it transitioned into a secondary school, continuing its mission of providing holistic education grounded in Catholic values of Faith, Hope, and love.

The Bogoso St. Augustine’s Past Students Association (BAPSA) actively supports the school through various initiatives. Notably, in 2023, BAPSA donated two sets of modern brass band instruments valued at GH¢50,000 to enhance the school's musical programs and community presence. Over the past six years, BAPSA's contributions have included infrastructure projects such as constructing a urinal block, extending electricity to the school church, and providing equipment like a corn milling machine and a multi-purpose printer.⁣

== Donations ==
Brass Band: In 2023, BAPSA donated GH¢50,000 worth of brass band instruments (trumpets, trombones, drums, etc.) to enhance music education and school events.

- Urinal block
- Corn milling machine
- Multipurpose printer
- Water storage poly-tank.

== Challenges and community role ==
Historically relied on rented equipment for events until BAPSA’s interventions. Serves as a key educational institution in Bogoso, promoting vocational and academic training in the Western Region

== Achievement ==
St. Augustine Senior High School is one of the notable senior high school participating in Ghana National Science and Maths Quiz, In 2021,the school made their maiden national in the preliminary stage.

Co winners of The 1st Ghana Science Olympiad (GSO) for Secondary Education Improvement Project (SEIP) schools was held in December 2018 at Gomoa Fetteh in the Central Region.

== See also ==
St. Augustine’s College, Cape Coast (parent institution)

BAPSA (alumni association)

== Key notes ==
- The school’s nickname is Augusco (shared with its Cape Coast predecessor) .
- For admissions or contact details, refer to School Code: 0040902.
