= Kwasi Anin-Yeboah =

Chief Justice of Ghana

Kwasi Anin-Yeboah JSC

Chief Justice of Ghana
- In office 7 January 2020 – 23 May 2023
- Nominated by: Nana Akufo-Addo
- Preceded by: Sophia Akuffo
- Succeeded by: Gertrude Torkornoo

Justice of the Supreme Court of Ghana
- In office 11 June 2008 – 23 May 2023
- Nominated by: John Kufuor

Justice of the Court of Appeal
- In office 16 September 2003 – 11 June 2008
- Nominated by: John Kufuor

Justice of the High Court
- In office June 2002 – 16 September 2003
- Nominated by: John Kufuor

Personal details
- Born: May 24, 1953 (age 73)
- Education: Amaniampong Senior High School; Apam Senior High School
- Alma mater: University of Ghana; Ghana School of Law

Kwasi Anin-Yeboah JSC (born 24 May 1953) is a Ghanaian judge and a former Chief Justice of Ghana. In December 2019, President Nana Addo Dankwa Akufo-Addo nominated Justice Anin-Yeboah as the Chief Justice of Ghana.

== Early life and education ==
Anin-Yeboah was born in Toase in Ashanti Region of Ghana on 24 May 1953. He attended Amaniampong Secondary School and Apam Secondary School from 1968 to 1976. He then continued his education at the University of Ghana and later the Ghana School of Law, graduating in 1981.

== Legal career in Ghana ==
After graduating from law school he served as an assistant state attorney at the Attorney General's Office in Koforidua. He proceeded to work as a partner at the Koforidua branch of Afisem Chambers. He was later elected as the Eastern Regional Bar President.

He served as a Justice of the High Court from 2002 to 2003 and the Court of Appeal from 2003 to 2008 in Ghana. Anin-Yeboah has also provided his legal experience to football in his country, serving as chairman both locally and nationally, as the Disciplinary Committee for the Eastern Region Football Association (FA) and Appeal Committee at the Ghana Football Association from 2004 to 2008. He is currently the chairman of the Legal Aid Board and Chairman of the Disciplinary Committee of the General Legal Council of Ghana. Anin-Yeboah was appointed to the Supreme Court of Ghana by President John Kufuor in June 2008. As of December 2019, Justice Anin-Yeboah was the fourth longest-serving Justice of the Supreme Court.

== Appointment as chief justice ==
In December 2019, President Nana Addo Dankwa Akufo-Addo nominated Justice Anin-Yeboah to replace Sophia Akuffo as Chief Justice of the Supreme Court of Ghana. His vetting was opposed by the Executive Director for the Alliance for Social Equity and Public Accountability (ASEPA), Mensah Thompson who wanted Parliament to put on hold, the vetting of Justice Anin Yeboah to allow for CHRAJ to complete investigations on a petition against the nominee. Mr. Mensah had alleged that Justice Anin Yeboah has not disclosed his assets and liabilities as required by law. The following was the findings and decisions of CHRAJ with respect to the non-declaration of asset as raised by Mr. Mensah.

=== Findings ===
At the end of the preliminary investigations the commission finds as a fact that the respondent has complied with article 286 of the constitution by declaring his assets and liabilities to the auditor general.

=== Decision ===
Having found out that the respondent had declared his assets and liabilities at the time the allegations were made and having satisfied the conditions for holding that office then, albeit a late submission, what should be the appropriate action that the commissioner should take in respect of the results of the investigation?

The commission is of the considered view that having found that the respondent has complied with article 286, the appropriate action in the circumstances would be to dismiss the compliant as overtaking, unsubstantiated and not made out. The compliant is accordingly dismissed.

Anin Yeboah whose appointment by Akuffo-Addo was in consultation with the Council of State as stipulated by the Constitution of Ghana was approved as the Chief Justice of the Republic of Ghana by the Parliament of Ghana after vetting in December 2019. He is the first male Chief Justice in 12 years.

Justice Anin Yeboah was sworn in as the 14th Chief Justice of the Supreme Court of Ghana on 7 January 2020.

== 2020 election petition hearing ==
The Supreme Court led by the Chief Justice Kwasi Anin-Yeboah dismissed the election petition which sought for a re-run of the 2020 election by the Petitioner, John Dramani Mahama as the presidential candidate of NDC.

John Mahama was challenging the election on the basis that his contender Nana Akufo-Addo and the other eight presidential candidates did not attain the mandatory 50%+1 vote constitutional threshold to be declared the winner of the polls.

== Contribution to academia ==
In addition to his work as a Justice of the Supreme Court he also serves as a Part-Time lecturer at the Ghana School of Law where he teaches Civil procedure and Ghana Legal System. Justice Anin-Yeboah's Legal experience includes writing judgement in constitutional matters, civil and criminal cases. He also provides opinions on legal matters in the West African nation.

== International assignments ==
FIFA is an international soccer's governing body and organizer of global tournaments including the World up. It was founded in 1904. It has a membership of 211. The following are some positions he occupied in the international arena.

- He rose to become a member of the adjudicatory chamber of FIFA and he was subsequently appointed in May 2017, as Chairman of the Disciplinary Committee of the 67th FIFA Congress in Bahrain
- Chairman of the FIFA Ethics Committee, a body primarily responsible for investigating possible infringements of the FIFA Code of Ethics.
- He is also the current Chairman of the Legal aid board.
- Anin Yeboah has also served in the Confederation of African Football (CAF)
- In September 2019, he was named onto the CAF/FIFA Reform Implementation Taskforce team for African football.

== Retirement ==
Anin Yeboah officially retired from Judiciary service on his birthday 24 May 2023. During a farewell party organised by the Ghana Bar Association, the president, Nana Akufo-Addo described him as one whose tenure brought honour to the Judiciary. According to him; "Chief Justice Anin-Yeboah has been an exceptional leader to the judiciary. He has guarded jealously the judiciary and his conduct has brought honour to the judiciary and to our country. Not only has he continued with the modernisation of activities of the judiciary, but his tenure of office has also seen arguably the largest infrastructural development undertaken in the history of the judiciary".

Anin-Yeboah was replaced by Justice Jones Dotse the most senior justice of the Supreme Court as acting Chief Justice until a substantive Chief Justice was appointed. Justice Gertrude Torkornoo the Chief Justice elect nominated by the president, was approved by Parliament, and sworn into office as the 15th Chief Justice of Ghana on 12 June 2023, by President Nana Akufo-Addo at the Jubilee House.

== See also ==
- Chief Justice of Ghana
- List of judges of the Supreme Court of Ghana
- Supreme Court of Ghana
