= Ekow Daniels =

Ghanaian politician (born 1929)

Ekow Daniels (born 9 May 1929) is a Ghanaian politician, lawyer, and former Interior Minister of Ghana. He was a member of the 2nd Parliament of the 1st Republic of Ghana on the ticket of the CPP.

== Early life and education ==
Daniels was born on 9 May 1929. He hails from Denkyimanfu, in the central region of Ghana. Daniels holds a Master's and a Doctor of Philosophy, which he attained from the University of London.

== Career ==
Prior to entering politics, Daniels was a legal practitioner. He was later elected as a member of parliament for Denkyimanfu during the 1965 Ghanaian Parliamentary Elections. Daniels was also appointed as Minister of the Interior and served from August 1979 to September 1981.
