= Raymond Atuguba =

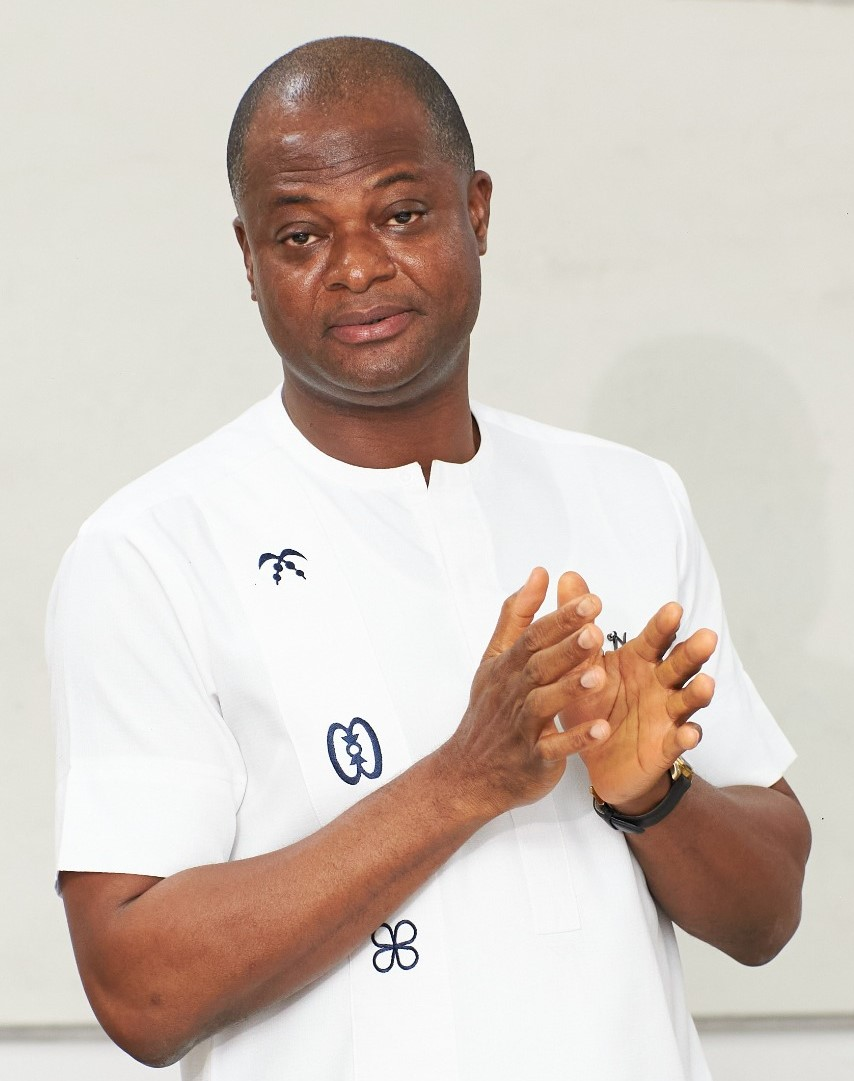
- Professor of General Jurisprudence and Director of Legal Education Ghana School of Law
- Born: Raymond Akongburo Atuguba; Ghana
- Citizenship: Ghanaian
- Occupations: Lawyer, Law Professor, Director
- Known for: Legal Training

Academic background
- Education: University of Ghana, Harvard Law School
- Alma mater: Harvard Law School (SJD, LLM); University of Ghana (LLB); Ghana Institute of Management and Public Administration (GIMPA)

Academic work
- Discipline: Law

Raymond Akongburo Atuguba also known as Raymon Atuguba is a Ghanaian lawyer and academic professor who is currently the Director of Legal Education at the Ghana School of Law. He has been professor of general jurisprudence and was the dean of the University of Ghana School of Law from 2019 to 2024, where he has been a faculty member since 2002. He served as a visiting Professor of Law and the Henry J. Steiner Visiting Professor of Human Rights at Harvard Law School from 2018 to 2019. In Spring 2024, he held the position of Bok Visiting International Professor at the University of Pennsylvania Carey Law School.

== Early life and education ==
Atuguba was born in rural Ghana. He pursued his undergraduate studies at the University of Ghana, graduating with First Class Honours in Law (LLB) in 1997. In 1999, he obtained certification as a Barrister and Solicitor of the Supreme Court of Ghana from the Ghana School of Law, earning Best Student awards in Civil Procedure, Family Law, and Commercial (Insurance) Law. He furthered his education at Harvard Law School, earning a Master of Laws (LLM) in 2000 and a Doctor of Juridical Science (SJD) with distinction in 2004. Additionally, he earned an Executive Master's in Business Administration (EMBA) from the Ghana Institute of Management and Public Administration (GIMPA) in 2014.

== Academic career ==
Atuguba has held various visiting and permanent positions at academic institutions and continues to contribute his expertise to the law and development field. He has shared his knowledge and insights at several universities across Africa, Europe, North America, Canada, and Australia.

Atuguba has over 100 publications, engaged in over 100 research and advocacy projects, and produced over 100 research and technical reports. He has delivered over 500 papers and presentations across all continents since the beginning of century. He has audited, reviewed, and drafted over 500 constitutions, policies, main legislation, strategies, regulations, guidelines, manuals, and procedures, primarily in African countries and worldwide. His research focuses on Policy, Law and Development in the Global South, Constitutional and Administrative Law in Africa, and Transnational Perspectives on Human Rights and Community Lawyering.

== Professional career ==
Atuguba's professional experience includes roles in the public sector, such as Executive Secretary to the Constitution Review Commission of Ghana set up by the then President John Atta Mills in 2010, and later the Executive Secretary to the President of Ghana John Mahama from 2012 - 2015. In the private sector, Atuguba is the founder and former Team Leader of Law and Development Associates (LADA), and he currently serves as the Managing Partner of Atuguba and Associates, a law firm that specializes in legal services. In the non-profit sector, he is the co-founder, former Executive Director, and former Board Chair of the Legal Resources Centre. Additionally, he serves as the Board Chair of the LADA Institute.

He has consulted for many African governments, including those of The Gambia, Ghana, Guinea Bissau, Lesotho, Liberia, Sierra Leone, Uganda, and Zimbabwe. His consultancy work extends to major international development agencies and NGOs such as the United Nations (UN), United Nations Development Programme (UNDP), United Nations Office of the High Commissioner for Human Rights (UN-OHCR), UNICEF, UNHCR, United Nations Office on Drugs and Crime (UNODC), United Nations Mission in Liberia (UNMIL), Food and Agriculture Organization (FAO), The World Bank, International Labour Organization (ILO), International Organization for Migration (IOM), European Union (EU), African Union (AU), Economic Community of West African States (ECOWAS), USAID, UK-AID (DFID), German Agency for International Cooperation (GIZ), Danish International Development Agency (DANIDA), Friedrich-Ebert-Stiftung (FES), Konrad-Adenauer-Stiftung (KAF), International Council on Human Rights Policy (ICHRP), Oxfam, IBIS, International Institute for Environment and Development (IIED), ActionAid International, Human Rights Watch, Human Rights First, CARE International, Plan International, Ford Foundation, Open Society Institute (OSI), and Open Society Initiative for West Africa (OSIWA).

Atuguba has also designed and led or co-led over 100 training programs and workshops and has chaired or participated in over 100 boards and committees at both national and international levels. From 1998 to 2008, he was projects director, then associate executive director, then executive director, then board chair of the Legal Resources Centre, Ghana.

In August 2025 he was appointed as the acting Director of Legal Education at the Ghana School of Law and months later his appointment was confirmed to be the Director of Legal Education.

== Achievements and honors ==
- 2024: Visiting International Professor of Law, University of Pennsylvania Carey School of Law, USA.
- 2018-2019: Henry J. Steiner Visiting Professor of Human Rights, Harvard Law School, USA.
- 2011-2014: Sheila Biddle Ford Fndn. Fellowship, W.E.B. Du Bois Institute for African and African-American Research, Harvard University, USA.
- 2004: SJD with Distinction, Harvard Law School, Harvard University, USA.

== Other projects ==
Atuguba has participated in the University of Ghana School of Law Projects Office and the Democratic Vigilance Project (DVP), a partnership between GIZ and the University of Ghana School of Law.
