= Sophia Akuffo =

Ghanaian judge (born 1949)

Sophia Abena Boafoa Akuffo JSC
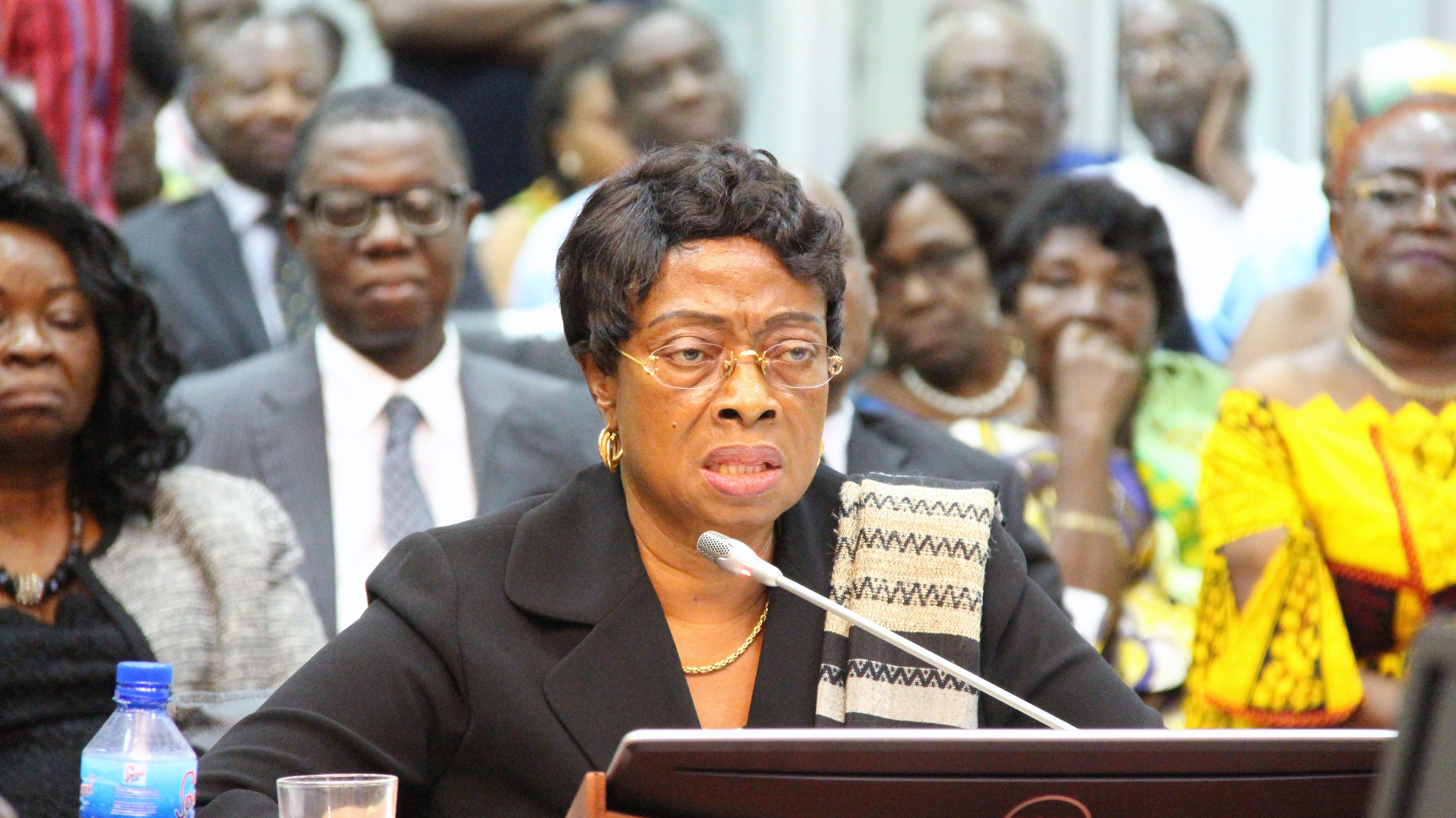
- Sophia Akuffo undergoing vetting for the role of Chief Justice in the Supreme Court of Ghana

13th Chief Justice of Ghana 24th Chief Justice of Gold Coast/Ghana
- In office 19 June 2017 – 20 December 2019
- Appointed by: Nana Akufo-Addo
- Preceded by: Georgina Wood
- Succeeded by: Kwasi Anin-Yeboah

Supreme Court Judge
- In office 30 November 1995 – 20 December 2019
- Appointed by: Jerry Rawlings

Personal details
- Born: 20 December 1949 (age 76) Akropong-Akuapem in the Eastern Region of Ghana
- Children: 1 daughter
- Education: Parliament Hill School; Wesley Girls' High School; University of Ghana; Ghana School of Law; Harvard University
- Occupation: Lawyer; Judge

Sophia Abena Boafoa Akuffo JSC (born 20 December 1949) is the former chief justice of Ghana from 19 June 2017 to 20 December 2019. She had been a judge in the Supreme Court of Ghana since 1995.

== Education ==
She was born on Akropong-Akuapem in the Eastern Region of Ghana to a Presbyterian minister. She had her secondary education at Parliament Hill School, Hampstead, London and Wesley Girls' High School, Cape Coast and obtained her Bachelor of law degree from the University of Ghana. She furthered her education at the Ghana School of Law where she qualified as a barrister in 1975. Akuffo trained as a lawyer under Nana Akufo-Addo, who would later become the president of Ghana in 2017. She has a master's degree in law from Harvard.

== Career ==
Sophia Akuffo worked about 20 years in private practice before being was raised to the Supreme Court bench by Jerry Rawlings in November 1995. She has been a member of the Governing Committee of the Commonwealth Judicial Education Institute, and the chairperson of the Alternative Dispute Resolution Task Force for several years. In January 2006, she was elected as one of the first judges of the African Court on Human and Peoples' Rights: she was initially elected for two years and was subsequently re-elected until 2014 and served as vice-president and president of the court respectively.

Akuffo wrote The Application of Information & Communication Technology in the Judicial Process – the Ghanaian Experience, a presentation to the African Judicial Network Ghana (2002).

=== Chief Justice of Ghana ===
On 11 May 2017, Akuffo was nominated as the highest ranking Judge of the Supreme Court of Ghana by Nana Akuffo-Addo, subject to approval by Parliament. She was sworn in by President Akuffo-Addo on 19 June 2017 as the thirteenth Chief Justice of the Republic of Ghana. The last judgment she was involved in was on 18 December 2019 when the Supreme Court passed a unanimous ruling that courts could sit at weekends and on bank holidays to deal with urgent legal cases. She also spoke of her gratitude to some former Presidents of Ghana, these included John Atta Mills who was her lecturer on Taxation at the Ghana Law School and also nominated her for the African Court of Human and Peoples’ Rights in Ethiopia. She also cited Jerry Rawlings who nominated her to the Supreme Court in 1995 and John Kufuor who nominated her for the African Court of Human and Peoples’ Rights in 2006. She became president of this court with the support of John Mahama and was nominated by Nana Akufo-Addo as chief justice.

== Judicial writings ==
- New Patriotic Party v Attorney-General (also referred to as the CIBA case) 1997 ICHRL 24 (12 March 1997)
- Abankro and Others Vrs Ansah (J2 2 of 2009) [2016] GHASC 74 (9 March 2016)
- Banful and Another Vrs Attorney General and Another (J1 7 of 2016) [2017] GHASC 21 (22 June 2017)
- Ghana Independent Broadcasters Association Vrs Attorney General and Another (J1 4 of 2016) [2017] GHASC 45 (3 November 2017)
- Chraj Vrs Attorney General and Others (J1 3 of 2010) [2011] GHASC 19 (6 April 2011)

After serving as chief justice, Akuffo retired in 2019.

On 28 March 2020, Nana Akufo-Addo appointed Akuffo to chair a newly formed COVID-19 National Trust Fund inaugurated during the COVID-19 pandemic.

She also serves as the chairperson of the board of the University of Ghana and holds membership on several boards of directors of various organizations.

== Family ==
Sophia Akuffo has a daughter, Violet Padi, and two grand children Samuel Osei and Cara Nyame. She has a large extended family including five living sisters but is seen to be closer to the three mentioned above.

== See also ==
- Chief Justice of Ghana
- First women lawyers around the world
- Judiciary of Ghana
- List of judges of the Supreme Court of Ghana
- Supreme Court of Ghana
- Kellelo Justina Mafoso-Guni

Legal offices
Preceded by Georgina Wood	Chief Justice of Ghana; 2017–2019	Succeeded by Kwasi Anin-Yeboah
