= Radio Gold =

Accra; Ghana
- Frequency: 90.5 MHz

Programming
- Language: English

Ownership
- Owner: Network Broadcasting Limited

Links
- Webcast: Listen live (via TuneIn)
- Website: https://www.radiogold905.com/

Radio Gold is a privately owned radio station in Accra, the capital of Ghana. According to rumours 31 December Women's Movement owns 50% shares of the radio station. The radio station was owned and founded by Kwasi Sainti Baffoe-Bonnie.
