= Sewua =

Town in Ashanti Region, Ghana

Coordinates: 6°46′N 1°50′W

- Location in Ghana
- Country: Ghana
- Region: Ashanti Region
- District: Bosomtwe District

Sewua is a town in the Bosomtwe District in the Ashanti Region of Ghana. It is at an elevation of 230 meters above sea level and inhabited by 104,194 people. The Chief of Sewua is Nana Kwaku Amankwah Sarkodie II.

== Institution ==
- Sewua Regional Hospital
