= Augustine Collins Ntim =

Ghanaian politician

Hon. Augustine Collins Ntim MP
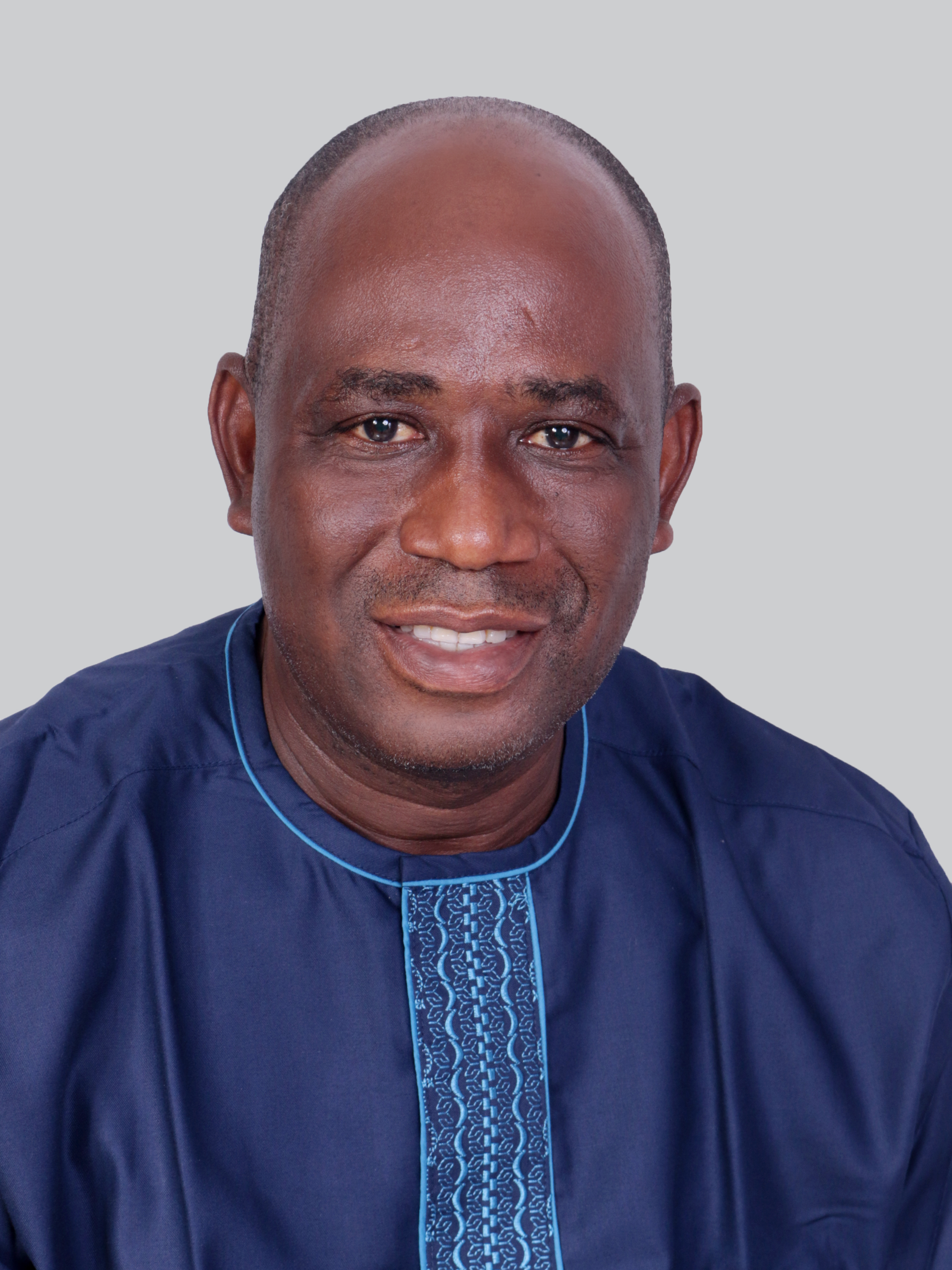

Member of the Ghana Parliament for Offinso North Constituency
- In office 7 January 2009 – Incumbent

Personal details
- Born: Augustine Collins Ntim; 24 September 1964 (age 62) Nkenkaasu, Ghana
- Party: New Patriotic Party
- Children: 6
- Education: Kwame Nkrumah University of Science and Technology
- Occupation: Politician
- Committees: Youth, Sports and Culture Committee; Members Holding Offices of Profit Committee

Augustine Collins Ntim (born September 24, 1964) is a Ghanaian politician and an educationist. He is a member of the Seventh Parliament of the Fourth Republic of Ghana representing the Offinso North Constituency in the Ashanti Region on the ticket of the New Patriotic Party.

== Early life and education ==
Augustine was born on 24 September 1964 in a town called Nkenkaasu in the Ashanti Region. He holds a Bachelor of Science degree and a Master of Science degree in Reproductive Biology from the Kwame Nkrumah University of Science and Technology. He also holds two academic certificates from Harvard Kennedy School.

== Political career ==
He was elected into parliament in 2009 where he won with over 3000 votes. He was re-elected on 7 January 2013 after the 2012 Ghanaian General Elections and reelected to enter parliament on 7 January 2017 after the completion of the 2016 Ghanaian General Elections where he obtained 53.15% of the total votes cast. He was again elected in the 2020 General elections where he obtained 48.67% of the total votes cast.

== Employment ==
He was the District Chief Executive for the Ministry of Local Government from the year 2005 to 2009. Ntim has been in the parliament of Ghana from 2009 till date. He is a member of the Government Assurance Committee which sees to the fulfilment of all promises and assurances given by ministers. He is also a member of the Health Committee.

=== Committees ===
He is a member of the Youth, Sports and Culture Committee and also a member of the Members Holding Offices of Profit Committee.

== Personal life ==
He is a Christian and married with six children.
