= Offinso North District =

- District
- Districts of Ashanti Region

- Location of Offinso North District within Ashanti
- Coordinates: 7°24′N 1°57′W
- Country: Ghana
- Region: Ashanti
- Capital: Akomadan

Government
  - District Executive: Hon. David Kwadwo Asare
  - Succeeded: Hon. Samuel Appiah-Kubi

Area
  - Total: 955.9 km^{2} (369.1 sq mi)

Population (2021)
  - Total: 83,440
  - Density: 87.29/km^{2} (226.1/sq mi)
- Time zone: UTC+0 (GMT)

Offinso North District is one of the forty-three districts in Ashanti Region, Ghana. Originally, it was formerly part of the then-larger Offinso District in 1988, which was created from the former Offinso District Council, until the northern part of the district was split off by a decree of then-president John Agyekum Kufuor to create Offinso North District on 29 February, 2008, while the remaining part has since been renamed Offinso Municipal District, which was elevated to municipal district assembly status on the same year. The district assembly is located in the northern part of Ashanti Region and has Akomadan as its capital town.

== Sources ==
- "Districts of Ghana". Statoids.
- GhanaDistricts.com
