= Senyo Dzamefe =

Ghanaian judge

Justice Senyo Dzamefe JSC

Justice of the Supreme Court of Ghana
- Incumbent
- Assumed office 3 July 2025
- Nominated by: John Mahama

Justice of the Court of Appeal
- In office 2010 – 3 July 2025
- Nominated by: John Atta Mills

Justice of the High Court
- In office 2000–2010
- Nominated by: John Jerry Rawlings

Personal details
- Born: Ghana
- Education: Hohoe Evangelical Presbyterian Secondary School; Jasikan College of Education
- Alma mater: University of Ghana; Ghana School of Law
- Profession: Judge

Senyo Dzamefe is a Ghanaian jurist and active justice of the Supreme Court of Ghana. Prior to this, he served as a Justice of the Court of Appeal and president of the Association of Magistrates and Judges of Ghana (AMJG) from 2018 to 2021. Dzamefe represented the Lower Courts on the Judiciary of Ghana from 1996 to 2000, the High Court Bench from 2006 to 2010, and the Court of Appeal Bench thereafter. He also served on the Rules Committee. Prior to his appointment to the Supreme Court of Ghana, he was the longest serving justice of the Appeal Court of Ghana.

== Early life and education ==
Dzamefe was born in the Volta Region to the late Rev. Henry Esau Dzamefe and Mrs. Edith Patricia Dzamefe of Agogoe Lume near Ho. He completed his elementary education at Ho-Kpodzi Evangelical Presbyterian School and secondary education at Hohoe Evangelical Presbyterian Secondary School, influenced by his father's role as a Reverend Pastor in the Evangelical Presbyterian Church. He pursued teacher training at Jasikan Training College (now Jasikan College of Education) and later enrolled at the University of Ghana, Legon in 1979, obtaining a Bachelor of Laws (LLB) degree in 1982. He attended the Ghana School of Law in 1982 and was called to the Bar in 1984. Additionally, he earned a Master's in Business Administration (MBA) in Management and Leadership from a university in Norway.

== Career ==
Dzamefe began his professional career as a National Service personnel at the Attorney General's Department in Ho, Volta Region, under Mrs. Sophia Adinyira, JSC (Retired Supreme Court Judge). After a period in the United Kingdom, he returned to Ghana and joined the National Public Tribunal as a Tribunal Chairman in 1988, presiding over the Tema Public Tribunal and serving as a visiting Chairman of the Wa Public Tribunal (Upper West Region). In 1994, following the merger of the tribunal and judicial systems, he joined the Judicial Service as Chairman of the Koforidua Circuit Tribunal. In 2000, after six years of service, he was appointed a High Court Judge, one of the first two Tribunal Chairmen to transition to the mainstream High Court. He served at the High Court in Sekondi from 2000 to 2002, Swedru from 2002 to 2008, and Accra in 2008, presiding over “Court 4,” known for handling serious criminal cases. In 2010, he was appointed to the Court of Appeal bench.

As Vice President of the AMJG from 1996 to 2000, he attended Commonwealth Magistrates and Judges Association (CMJA) conferences in Scotland and Canada. He was elected AMJG President in 2018, and served until 2021. He also served on the Local Organizing Committee for the CMJA's 19th Triennial Conference held in Accra in September 2022. In 2025, Dzamefe was appointed as a Justice of the Supreme Court of Ghana.

== Supreme Court appointment ==
=== Nomination ===
In April 2025, Justice Dzamefe was nominated by President John Dramani Mahama for appointment to the Supreme Court of Ghana. His nomination formed part of a group of seven Justices of the Court of Appeal who were selected for elevation to the nation's highest court of jurisdiction. The process was carried out under Article 144(2) of the 1992 Constitution, which empowered the President to nominate candidates for the Supreme Court subject to the advice of the Judicial Council and the approval of Parliament.

The formal communication of his nomination was conveyed in a letter dated 29 April 2025, signed by Dr. Callistus Mahama, Executive Secretary to the President, and addressed to the Acting Chief Justice, Justice Paul Baffoe-Bonnie.

=== Vetting ===
On 16 June 2025, Dzamefe appeared before the Parliament's Appointments Committee, chaired by First Deputy Speaker Bernard Ahiafor, as part of the vetting process for his Supreme Court nomination. During the session, he advocated for judicial reforms, including the introduction of strict timelines for case resolution, proposing three months for criminal cases and six months for civil cases, to enhance justice delivery. He emphasized the importance of human resources, advocating for staff motivation and the expansion of court infrastructure to address case backlogs. Dzamefe supported the establishment of regional tribunals, as provided under Article 142 of the 1992 Constitution, to handle criminal cases and reduce pressure on mainstream courts. He also endorsed the use of modern technologies, such as artificial intelligence for voice recording and transcription, and the nationwide rollout of virtual courts to minimize adjournments and improve accessibility.

Dzamefe addressed concerns about judicial transparency, affirming that judges, as public officers, must declare their assets as required by the Constitution, confirming he had complied with this obligation. He rejected any measures to suppress investigative journalism, emphasizing support for press freedom when reporting is truthful and in the public interest. Additionally, he clarified a constitutional gap regarding presidential authority in the absence of the President, Vice President, and Speaker of Parliament, noting no provision requires the Chief Justice to assume such a role. Responding to questions about judicial impartiality, Dzamefe asserted that his judgments were based solely on evidence, not personal relationships, addressing concerns raised by the MP for Manhyia South about potential influences from government interactions. He also reflected on his role as chair of the Commission of Enquiry into the 2014 World Cup scandal, reiterating recommendations such as including at least three Ghana-based players in the Black Stars, discontinuing state-sponsored supporter travel, and prohibiting cash payments to players to prevent administrative mismanagement.

=== Approval ===
On 18 June 2025, Dzamefe's appointment to the Supreme Court of Ghana was approved by Parliament, following a contentious plenary debate and a decisive voice vote. The approval came after the Appointments Committee presented its final report, with the Majority in Parliament endorsing the nomination despite strong opposition from the Minority caucus. The Minority argued that the appointments were inconsistent with the recent suspension of the Chief Justice and raised constitutional concerns, asserting that their objections were not adequately captured in the committee's report and unanimously voting against all seven nominees. Nevertheless, the Majority's support ensured Dzamefe's confirmation, along with the other six nominees.

=== Swearing-in ===
On 3 July 2025, Dzamefe was sworn in as a Justice of the Supreme Court of Ghana by President John Dramani Mahama at the Jubilee House, alongside six other justices, following their approval by Parliament. During the ceremony, Dzamefe, speaking on behalf of his fellow appointees, pledged to dispense justice impartially, stating that the justices would serve all Ghanaians without fear, favour, ill will, or affection, and uphold equal justice under the law. He reflected on the challenges of his judicial career, describing the journey to the Supreme Court as long and arduous, and expressed gratitude to his family, particularly his spouse and children, for their unwavering support. Dzamefe noted that his children had frequently questioned why his name was absent from previous Supreme Court nomination lists, and he acknowledged their encouragement, stating that the day of his appointment had finally arrived. He also invoked divine guidance, praying for strength to fulfill the responsibilities entrusted to the new justices, and reaffirmed his commitment to Ghana's judicial system and its constitutional duties.

== Personal life ==
Dzamefe loves to exercise in his spare time and is a fan of Liverpool football club.
