= Kweku Tawiah Ackaah-Boafo =

Ghanaian judge

Justice Kweku Tawiah Ackaah-Boafo JSC

Justice of the Supreme Court of Ghana
- Incumbent
- Assumed office 3 July 2025
- Nominated by: John Mahama

Justice of the Court of Appeal
- In office December 2022 – 3 July 2025
- Nominated by: Nana Akufo-Addo

Justice of the High Court
- In office April 2015 – December 2022
- Nominated by: John Mahama

Personal details
- Born: Accra, Ghana
- Education: St. Augustine's Senior High School (Bogoso); Winneba Senior High School; Sekondi College
- Alma mater: University of Ghana; Ghana School of Law; University of Helsinki; Ghana Institute of Management and Public Administration
- Profession: Judge

Kweku Tawiah Ackaah-Boafo is a Ghanaian jurist and an active justice of the Supreme Court of Ghana.

== Early life and education ==
Ackaah-Boafo was born in Accra to Agnes Quaison and Nicholas Adu Ackaah and hails from Insu-Siding in the Western Region of Ghana.

He had his secondary education at St. Augustine's Secondary School, Bogoso, Winneba Secondary School (now Winneba Senior High School) where he obtained his O-Level certificate and Sekondi College where he obtained his A-Level certificate. He obtained a Bachelor of Laws (LLB) from the University of Ghana from 1991 to 1994, followed by a professional law program (BL) at the Ghana School of Law from 1994 to 1996. He pursued further studies at the Erik Castrén Institute of International Law and Human Rights, University of Helsinki, Finland, in 1999, earning a Master of Laws (LLM) in 2002. He completed an Executive Master of Arts in African Integration and Development (EMRIAD) at the Ghana Institute of Management and Public Administration (GIMPA), graduating as the Overall Best Student in 2021.

== Career ==
Ackaah-Boafo had his pupillage at Bosomtwe Sam and Associates in Takoradi and went on to found Kendicks Law Firm with Ben Ackaah Gyasi. Following his studies in Finland, he proceeded to Canada where he enrolled at the University of Ottawa for his pupillage, after which he was called to the Canadian Bar. In Canada, he worked as a barrister and solicitor in Toronto, specializing in criminal law, family law, and immigration law. He appeared before provincial and federal courts, as well as adjudication tribunals such as the Immigration and Refugee Board (IRB) and the Immigration Appeal Division (IAD) of Citizenship and Immigration Canada, notably contributing to the Jane Creba trial.

Upon returning to Ghana, he joined the judiciary and served as a justice of the High Court (General Jurisdiction Division, Accra) from April 2015 to December 2022. During this period, he delivered significant judgments, including a medical negligence case against the 37 Military Hospital, holding the hospital liable for the death of a 27-year-old PhD candidate, and a copyright infringement case involving the joint ownership of an unpublished law book, Annotated Evidence Act of Ghana.

In December 2022, Ackaah-Boafo was appointed to the Court of Appeal, where he continued to adjudicate cases, including the Republic v Cassiel Ato Forson and Richard Jakpa case, which garnered public attention. In 2025, he was sworn in as a justice of the Supreme Court of Ghana. Ackaah-Boafo has emphasized the importance of concise and accessible judgments to enhance public understanding of legal decisions, drawing inspiration from his training under lawyers such as Yiadom Atuobi-Danso and Justice Gordon Cudjoe in Canada. He has also served as a part-time lecturer at the Ghana School of Law since 2021, teaching legal ethics to promote integrity within the profession.

== Supreme Court appointment ==
=== Nomination and petition against nomination ===
In 2025, Ackaah-Boafo was nominated by President John Dramani Mahama for appointment to the Supreme Court of Ghana as one of seven Court of Appeal justices, pursuant to Article 144(2) of the 1992 Constitution of Ghana, which authorized the president to nominate individuals for the Supreme Court, subject to the advice of the Judicial Council and parliamentary approval. The nomination was conveyed in a letter dated April 29, 2025, signed by Dr. Callistus Mahama, executive secretary to the President, and addressed to Justice Paul Baffoe-Bonnie, acting chief justice. Ackaah-Boafo, who had served on the Court of Appeal since December 2022, was recognized for his analytical approach to law and commitment to justice delivery. The nomination aimed to strengthen the judiciary and ensure effective administration of justice.

However, Ackaah-Boafo's vetting process, initially scheduled for June 19, 2025, was suspended by the Parliament's Appointments Committee due to a petition filed by Anthony Kwabenya Rau, who accused Ackaah-Boafo of judicial bias, misconduct, and inappropriate courtroom conduct during a 2019 High Court case. Rau, a self-described human rights activist, alleged that Ackaah-Boafo insulted him, labelling him "arrogant" and "power drunk," and questioned his legitimacy as an advocate. The petition referenced a 2019 ruling in which Ackaah-Boafo criticized Rau's three-page protest letter as a "fictional and selfish narrative" lacking evidence, accusing Rau of sensationalism to secure contracts under the pretence of foreign expertise. Rau further claimed political bias, alleging that Ackaah-Boafo's promotions were linked to favourable rulings for individuals aligned with both the New Patriotic Party (NPP) and National Democratic Congress (NDC), and described him as a "political prostitute." The Appointments Committee halted the vetting to review the petition, which parliamentary sources deemed significant enough to warrant scrutiny. After assessment, the Speaker of Parliament and the Committee dismissed the petition for lacking merit, allowing Ackaah-Boafo's vetting to resume on 20 June 2025.

=== Vetting ===
On 20 June 2025, Ackaah-Boafo appeared before the Parliament's Appointments Committee for his Supreme Court vetting, following the dismissal of the petition against his nomination. He defended the institutional independence of the judiciary, describing it as the "arbiter of the nation" with a constitutional obligation to intervene when necessary to uphold Ghana’s democratic framework. He expressed concern about the limited number of practicing lawyers in Ghana, noting that as of May 2025, approximately 8,000 out of 11,000 lawyers were practicing, with regions like Western North having fewer than five lawyers, resulting in a ratio of one lawyer per 2,000 people. To address this, he proposed a national discussion on expanding professional legal training within law faculties offering LLB programs, while emphasizing the need for quality instruction and adequate training capacity.

Ackaah-Boafo highlighted the increasing public awareness of legal rights, which had led to greater demand on courts, and stressed the importance of increasing the number of lawyers to meet this demand, particularly to support self-represented litigants. He advocated for the judiciary to embrace artificial intelligence (AI) cautiously, proposing its use for tasks like digitizing case empaneling to reduce perceptions of bias in judicial assignments. He also recommended statutory legislation for electronic empaneling, including at the Supreme Court, and suggested panel heads, including the Chief Justice, to whom cases would be randomly assigned. Ackaah-Boafo emphasized the need for continuous judicial training, citing resource constraints at the Judicial Training Institute (JTI) and his own experience with delayed funding. He urged systemic support to make judicial roles attractive to top legal minds. Additionally, he called on the Attorney-General and state prosecutors to refrain from prejudicial comments during ongoing investigations, noting that such statements could undermine the presumption of innocence and compromise fair trial standards, particularly in high-profile cases like those involving the National Service Authority and the National Signal Bureau.

=== Approval ===
Ackaah-Boafo’s appointment to the Supreme Court of Ghana was approved by Parliament, following a contentious plenary debate and a decisive voice vote on 25 June 2025. The approval came after the Appointments Committee, chaired by Bernard Ahiafor, presented its report, which affirmed that Ackaah-Boafo and the other nominees possessed the requisite qualifications, judicial temperament, and commitment to constitutional values expected of Supreme Court Justices. The Majority, led by Mahama Ayariga, endorsed the nominations, arguing that there was no constitutional breach in the President’s decision and emphasizing Ackaah-Boafo’s competence. However, the Minority, led by Alexander Afenyo-Markin, strongly opposed the appointments, citing concerns over the suspension of the Chief Justice and alleging that the nominations were an attempt to reshape the constitutional order rather than address vacancies. The Minority further criticized the process as executive overreach, with MP Ibrahim Murtala Muhammed highlighting the high number of judicial appointments under the previous administration as evidence of a broader strategy. Despite these objections, the Majority’s support secured Ackaah-Boafo’s confirmation, along with the other six nominees.

=== Swearing-in ===
On 3 July 2025, Ackaah-Boafo was sworn in as a justice of the Supreme Court of Ghana by President John Dramani Mahama at the Jubilee House, alongside six other justices, following their parliamentary approval under Article 144 of the 1992 Constitution. The ceremony expanded the Supreme Court to manage increasing constitutional, electoral, and appellate cases.

During the ceremony, Ackaah-Boafo, along with other justices, was urged by President Mahama to uphold judicial independence as a critical partner in national development. The president emphasized that the judiciary must remain free from political interference, economic manipulation, and public intimidation. He encouraged Ackaah-Boafo and the justices to adhere to their oath of office, maintaining integrity, fairness, and impartiality in their judicial duties, guided by constitutional principles rather than public pressure or personal biases.

== Personal life ==
Ackaah-Boafo is a Christian and a member of the Full Gospel Business Men’s Fellowship International, East Legon Chapter, and the Fountain of Glory Assemblies of God Church, where he serves as a deacon, board member, and president of the men’s ministry.

He is married to Joycelyn Kuukua Ackaah-Boafo and has two children, Nicholas and Maud.

In his leisure time, he enjoys watching Liverpool football matches, reading biographies and foreign judgments, and spending time at home.
