= Trabuom =

- Country: Ghana
- Region: Ashanti Region

Trabuom is a town in the Ashanti Region of Ghana. The town is known for the Afia Kobi Ampem Girls Secondary School. The school is a second cycle institution.
