= Offinso North (Ghana parliament constituency) =

Constituency in the Ashanti Region of Ghana

Old Tafo
- constituency for the Parliament of Ghana
- District: Offinso North District
- Region: Ashanti Region of Ghana

Current constituency
- Party: New Patriotic Party
- MP: Fred Kyei Asamoah

Offinso North is one of the constituencies represented in the Parliament of Ghana. It elects one Member of Parliament (MP) by the first past the post system of election.

Fred Kyei Asamoah is the member of parliament for the constituency. He was elected on the ticket of the New Patriotic Party (NPP) won a majority of 3,014 votes to become the MP. He succeeded Augustine Collins Ntim who had represented the constituency in the 4th Republic parliament.

== See also ==
- List of Ghana Parliament constituencies
