= Paul Baffoe-Bonnie =

Ghanaian judge

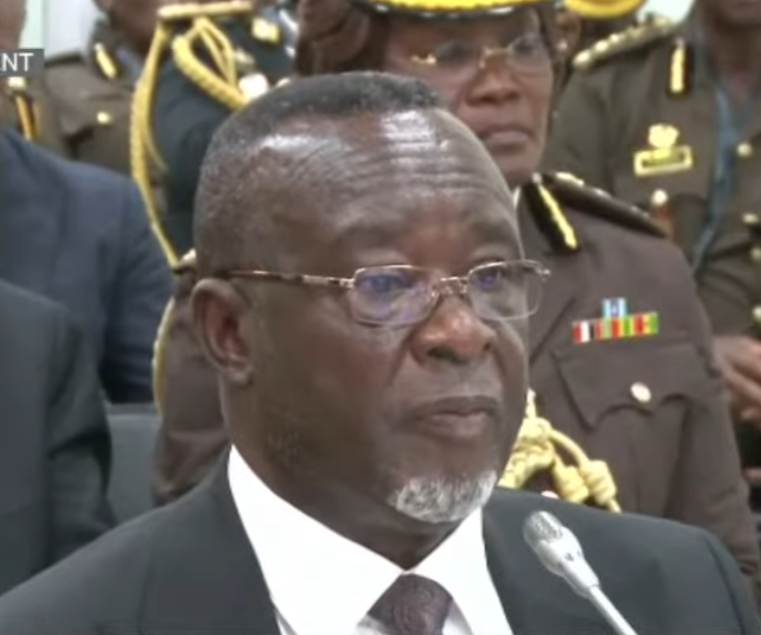
- Baffoe-Bonnie in 2025

Chief Justice of Ghana
- Incumbent
- Assumed office 17 November 2025
- Nominated by: John Mahama

Justice of the Supreme Court of Ghana
- Incumbent
- Assumed office 11 June 2008
- Nominated by: John Kufuor

Justice of the Court of Appeal
- In office 22 November 2006 – 11 June 2008
- Nominated by: John Kufuor

Justice of the High Court
- In office 2000 – 22 November 2006
- Nominated by: Jerry John Rawlings

Personal details
- Born: Paul Kwadwo Baffoe-Bonnie; December 26, 1956 (age 69)
- Spouse(s): Patience Baffoe-Bonnie, Director General of Ghana Prisons Service
- Parents: Opanyin Baffoe-Bonnie (father); Ama Amponsah (mother)
- Relatives: Kwasi Sainti Baffoe-Bonnie (brother)
- Education: Konongo Odumase Secondary School; University of Ghana
- Profession: Judge

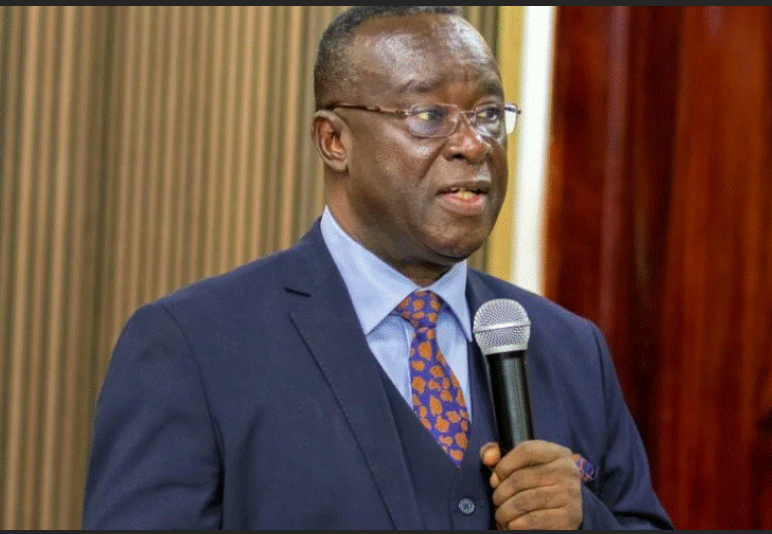
Justice Paul Baffoe-Bonnie in 2025

Paul Kwadwo Baffoe-Bonnie (born 26 December 1956) is a Ghanaian Supreme Court Judge. He is the Chief Justice of Ghana. He was nominated for the role of substantive Chief Justice on September 21, 2025. He was vetted and approved by Parliament of Ghana and was sworn in as Chief Justice of Ghana on 17 November 2025.

== Early life and education ==
Baffoe-Bonnie was born on 26 December 1956; his parents are Opanyin Baffoe-Bonnie, from Sewua in the Bosomtwe district, and Ama Kyerewaa, from Breman in Kumasi. He received education from the Goaso Local Authority primary and middle schools, completing his Middle School Leaving Certificate examinations in the late 1960s. He attended Konongo Odumase Secondary School from 1969 to 1976, where he obtained his GCE Ordinary Level and GCE Advanced Level certificates. He then attended the University of Ghana and later the Ghana School of Law.

In law school, Baffoe-Bonnie was roommates with New Patriotic Party politician Kwadwo Owusu Afriyie and very good friends with former Chief Justice of Ghana Kwasi Anin-Yeboah; he referred to the three of them forming "a trio of village law students".

== Career ==
Baffoe-Bonnie was called to the Bar in Ghana in 1983. He worked as a Circuit Court Judge at Kumasi, and later served as High Court Judge at Duayaw Nkwanta. He was appointed an Appeals Court judge in 2006. He was appointed a Supreme Court Judge by the President of Ghana John Kufuor in June 2008.

=== Election petition ===
In 2013, Baffoe-Bonnie was on the panel of Supreme Court Judges who ruled against a petition brought before it where the New Patriotic Party asked for about four million votes to be scrapped for alleged tampering in the 2012 Ghanaian general election.

=== Appointment as Acting Chief Justice ===
Baffoe-Bonnie was appointed to serve as acting Chief Justice of Ghana following the suspension of Gertrude Torkornoo on April 23. His appointment and vetting was challenged by the removed Chief Justice on 16 October 2025, alleging that her removal was unconstitutional and that the findings of the committee were "irrational, absurd and perverse in the Wednesbury sense".

== Personal life ==
Baffoe-Bonnie is married to Patience Baffoe-Bonnie. Kwasi Sainti Baffoe-Bonnie, who owned Network Broadcasting Company Limited which run Radio Gold FM in Ghana, was his brother.

== See also ==
- List of judges of the Supreme Court of Ghana
- Supreme Court of Ghana
