= Appeals Court of Ghana =

Law, the Judiciary Arm of Government in Ghana

The Appeals Court of Ghana is the second highest court in the hierarchy of Superior Courts. The Court has no original jurisdiction. As the name implies, all appeal cases from the High Courts, Regional Tribunals and Civil appeals from Circuit Courts are brought to the Court of Appeal. It also hears appeals from some of the administrative bodies including Commissions of Inquiry set under the Constitution. It is therefore, purely an appellate Court.

Judges who sit in the Court of Appeal are referred to as Justices of the Court of Appeal. A panel of three duly constitutes the Court of Appeal. Currently, the Court of Appeal is located in Accra (for the southern sector) and Kumasi (for the Northern sector).

== History ==
In the colonial era, there were two systems of courts in place: the first system consisted of the Privy Council, West African Court of Appeal, the Supreme Court of the Gold Coast and Magistrates' Courts. The second system was the Native Courts. The two systems remained until independence in 1957.

Upon attainment of independence, changes were made. The Court of appeal was then established as the highest Court in Ghana and appeals to the Privy Council and the West African Court of Appeal were discontinued.
