= Ghana School of Law =

Educational institution for training lawyers in Ghana

Coordinates: 5.555608°N 0.196327°W

- Abbreviation: GSL
- Formation: 1958; 68 years ago
- Type: Law School
- Purpose: Train lawyers
- Headquarters: Ghana
- Location: Accra, Ghana
- Official language: English
- Director: Professor Raymond Atuguba.
- Website: www.gslaw.edu.gh/index.php

The Ghana School of Law (GSL) is an educational institution in Ghana for training lawyers. The school is the only institution responsible for training for law graduates in the Professional Law Course (PLC) programme and the Post-Call Law Course.

The PLC programme is designed for law graduates who have obtained an LL.B degree or its equivalence and have passed the entrance examination into the Ghana School of Law. The Post-Call Law Course on the other hand is designed for Ghanaians or non-Ghanaians who have qualified in common law jurisdictions outside Ghana, which operate a legal system analogous to that of Ghana. On completion of either courses, the graduate is qualified to practice law in Ghana. Prior to the establishment of the Ghana School of Law in 1958, all lawyers in Ghana were trained abroad, almost always at the Inns of Court in England.

By convention, all lawyers admitted to practice in Ghana become automatic members of the Ghana Bar Association.

== History of the Ghana School of Law ==
After Ghana attained independence in 1957, the development of legal education was discussed after which the legal practitioner's Act, of 1958 was enacted, which gave birth to General Legal Council. The council was charged with the responsibility of organizing legal education in Ghana. The first African Chief Justice of Ghana Sir Kobina Arku Korsah, appointed Professor J. H. A. Lang as the first Director of Legal Education to ensure the administration and supervision of Legal Education and also the establishment of some courses on instruction. The main campus of the Ghana School of Law is at Makola in Accra. Other satellite campuses were also subsequently established at Kwame Nkrumah University of Science and Technology in Kumasi, GIMPA campus near Legon, and UPSA. The Kumasi campus of the GSL was officially inaugurated in November 2010 by Her Ladyship Mrs Justice Georgina Theodora Woode, Chief Justice of the Republic of Ghana at the time.

== Academics and Curriculum ==
The Ghana School of Law offers the following programs;

=== Professional Law Course (PLC) ===
This is a two year Programme designed for Bachelor of Laws graduates from the University of Ghana, Kwame Nkrumah University of Science and Technology and other universities approved by the Council. The students of the Professional Law Course study the following compulsory subjects;

- Part I:

- Alternative Dispute Resolution(ADR)
- Civil Procedure
- Company and Commercial Practice
- Criminal Procedure
- Law of Evidence
- Law Practice Management and Legal Accountancy

- Part II:

- Advocacy & Legal Ethics
- Conveyancing and Drafting
- Family Law and Practice
- Interpretation of Deeds and Statutes.

=== Post Call Law Course ===
This course is designed for Ghanaians or non-Ghanaians who have qualified in Common Law countries outside Ghana, which operate a legal system analogous to Ghana. Post-Call students study the following subjects:

- Criminal Procedure
- Civil Procedure Law of Evidence
- Family Law & Practice
- Law of Interpretation of Deeds and Statutes
- Ghana Constitutional Law
- Ghana Legal System

=== The Legal Education Reform, Act 1170 (2026) ===
President John Dramani Mahama signed the Legal Education Bill, 2026 into law on 11th May, 2026 at the Jubilee House in Accra. The Legal Education Bill establishes the Council For Legal Education and Training (CLET) as the council to obligated to regulate legal education in Ghana as well as provide the curriculum for legal education. CLET has also been tasked with licensing and accrediting legal institutions and universities in taking legal education programmes in collaboration with the Ghana Tertiary Education Committee ( GTEC).

This reform law creates equal opportunities for those aspiring to be lawyers in Ghana. This births the Law Practice Programme.

The new law introduces a 4-stage path to the Ghana Bar;

1. Bachelor of Laws (LL.B.) at an accredited institution (including interim One-Year Transitional Pre-Bar Course)
2. 1 year Law Practice Training (LPT) at an accredited institution
3. National Bar Examinations
4. Call to the Ghana Bar upon satisfaction of professional fitness criteria.

Act 1170 abolishes the Independent Examinations Committee (IEC) and the entrance examinations for admission to professional legal training, thereby making admissions no longer based on IEC examinations. All admissions will therefore depend on each institution’s internal academic rules, admission policies, available capacity and relevant regulatory requirements.

The Legal Education Act establishes a Council for Legal Education and Training (CLET) to regulate legal education in Ghana and ensure the maintenance and promotion of the highest possible standards in legal education. Although the Council is yet to be constituted and universities are yet to be accredited to run the new LPT Programme, the Attorney-General and Minister for Justice, Dr. Dominic Akuritinga Ayine, following consultations with the Chairman of the General Legal Council, issued Interim Policy Directives to all accredited universities offering law programmes to address urgent matters arising during the period of transition to the new legal education regime.

With the Act coming into force ahead of the 2026/2027 academic year, there is insufficient time for institutions to be accredited to begin the Law Practice Training (LPT) under the new law. In addition, there is an existing estimated 5,000 to 8,000 LL.B. graduates awaiting professional legal training. As a result, transitional arrangements are necessary to ensure the smooth and effective implementation of the new legal education framework.

The Interim Policy Directives provide transitional arrangements for students graduating with an LL.B. in 2026 and for the existing backlog of LL.B. graduates. They are also intended to prepare law faculties for the implementation of the new legal education framework and to ensure continuity and stability in legal education during the transition period.

The Transitional Pre-Bar Course

The director of Legal Education and the Ghana School of Law, Professor Raymond Atuguba issued directives on behalf of the Attorney-General and the Minister for Justice of the republic of Ghana introducing the Pre-Bar Course which serves as transitional arrangements following the passage of the Legal Education Act, 2026 (Act 1170), the Government of Ghana introduced transitional arrangements for LLB graduates and students awaiting admission into professional legal education. Under the reforms, accredited universities may retain graduating LLB students for an additional year to undertake a Pre-Bar Course covering core theoretical subjects:

- Company Law
- Commercial Law
- Alternative Dispute Resolution (ADR)
- Family Law
- Interpretation of Deeds and Statutes
- Any other relevant elective subjects (including those that the faculties may include to make up any minimum credit requirements)

Graduates who complete the course become eligible for the Law Practice Training (LPT) Programme and the National Bar Examinations.

The reforms also abolish the previous entrance examination system administered by the Independent Examinations Committee (IEC). Existing LLB graduates may now apply directly to accredited law faculties or the Ghana School of Law for admission into the transitional programme. Universities that are unable to offer the Pre-Bar Course may collaborate with or transfer students to the Ghana School of Law.

Those eligible for this course are;

- LLB Graduates - Class of 2026
- Existing LLB Graduates
- Graduates from Any GTEC/GLC Accredited Law Faculty
- Ghanaian Nationals with LLB from Common Law Jurisdictions

The government indicated that the reforms are intended to facilitate the decentralisation of professional legal training to accredited law faculties while addressing a backlog of thousands of LLB graduates awaiting entry into professional legal education. Applications for accreditation to run the LPT Programme are expected to commence in October 2026, with full implementation of the new framework targeted for the 2027–28 academic year.

The Law Practice Training (LPT)

During his June 2025 vetting before Parliament's Appointments Committee as a nominee to the Supreme Court, Justice Philip Bright Mensah advocated reforms to Ghana's legal education system to address the growing number of LLB graduates seeking professional legal training. He proposed that accredited law faculties be permitted to provide professional legal training in addition to academic legal education, rather than limiting such training to the Ghana School of Law. Justice Mensah argued that expanding professional training capacity could help reduce the backlog of graduates awaiting admission and suggested that candidates who had already completed their LLB programme be given priority consideration for admission into professional legal education. Under the Law Practice Training, the following courses will be covered;

- Civi Procedure
- Criminal Procedure
- Law of Evidence
- Conveyancing & Drafting
- Advocacy & Legal Ethics
- Law Practice Management
- Legal Accounting

== Directors ==
Professor Raymond Akongburo Atuguba is the current Director of the Ghana School of Law, having taken over from Justice Nana Barima Yaw Kodie Oppong on September 1, 2025. Justice Oppong who was recalled to the judiciary.

=== List of directors of the Ghana School of Law ===
Director	Years
Professor John H. A. Lang	1958 - 1962
Professor W.B Harvey	1962 - 1964
Dr. William C. Ekow Daniels	1964 -1966
Hon. Justice Amaa Ollenu (Acting)	1966 - 1969
Hon. Mr. Justice Amissah (Acting)	1969 - 1973
Dr. William C. Ekow Daniels	1973 - 1980
Ofori Boateng	1981 - 1989
B.J. Da Rocha	1989 - 1992
Dr. Seth Y. Bimpong-Buta	1992 - 2001
Prof. Akua Kuenyehia (Acting)	2001 - 2002
Kwaku Ansa Asare	2003 - 2005
Professor Nii Ashie Kotey (Acting)	2005 - 2007
Dr. Kofi Oti Adinkrah (Acting)	2007 - 2008
George Sarpong	2009 - 2012
Kwasi Prempeh Eck	2012 - 2020
Maxwell Oppong Agyemang ( Acting)	2020 - 2021
Kwasi Prempeh Eck	2021 - 2022
Nana Barima Yaw Kodie Oppong	2022 - 2025
Professor Raymond Akongburo Atuguba	2025 - till date

== Registrars ==
=== List of registrars of the Ghana School of Law ===
Name	Years
S.K.A Kodjovie ESQ	1984 - 1986
V.Y Tei	1987 - 1990
M.W Okyere ESQ	1991 - 2003
Linda Doku (Mrs.)	2004 - 2007
N.C.A Agbevor ESQ	2007 - 2008
Nana Fredua Owusu Agyemang ESQ	2008 - 2012
Nana C. Osei-Bonsu ESQ	2012 - 2018
Franklina Gesh A. Adanu (Acting)	2018 - 2019
Juliet M. Adu-Adjei	2019 - To Date

== See also ==
- B. J. Da Rocha
- Peter Ala Adjetey
- V.C.R.A.C. Crabbe
- General Legal Council
- Ghana Bar Association
