= Ababio =

Ababio is a Ghanaian surname. Notable people with the surname include:

- Adu Ababio II. (1931–2007), Ghanaian traditional ruler
- Alexander Ransford Ababio (1927–2002), Ghanaian politician
- Eddie Ababio (born 1988), Ghanaian-American soccer player
- Grace Amponsah-Ababio (born 1941), Ghanaian dentist and diplomat
- Isaac Ababio (1940–2018), Ghanaian evangelist
- Joyce Ababio, Ghanaian fashion designer
- Oblempong Nii Kojo Ababio V (1920–2017), Ghanaian dental surgeon and traditional ruler
- Odeneho Gyapong Ababio II, Ghanaian traditional ruler
- Randy Ababio (born 1996), Dutch footballer
- Yaw Ntow Ababio (born 1959), Ghanaian politician

== See also ==
- Gottlieb Ababio Adom (1904–1979), Ghanaian educator, journalist, editor and Presbyterian minister
