= Wesley Girls' Senior High School =

Educational institution for girls in Cape Coast, Ghana

- Cape Coast, Ghana

Information
- Type: Mission Secondary/High School
- Motto: Live Pure, Speak True, Right Wrong, Follow the King
- Established: 1836; 190 years ago
- Sister school: Mfantsipim School
- Head of school: Ms. Evelyn Nana Efua Assan
- Staff: 68
- Gender: Female
- Enrollment: 3000
- Colors: Green and yellow
- Affiliation: Wesleyan - Methodist Church
- Address: P.O. Box 61; Cape Coast, Ghana
- Telephone: +233 3321 32218
- Houses: Bellamy, Ellis, Waldron, Wrigley, Wardbrew, Compton, Abban, Garnett Acheampong, Thompson Djokoto, Oppong-Ankomah Siameh
- Website: wesleygirls.edu.gh

Wesley Girls' High School (WGHS) is an educational institution for girls in Cape Coast in the Central region of Ghana. It was founded in 1836 by Harriet Wrigley, the wife of a Methodist minister. The school is named after the founder of Methodism, John Wesley.

== History ==
=== Founding Years ===
On 15 September 1836, Harriet Wrigley arrived in Cape Coast accompanying her husband Reverend George Wrigley (the second Methodist missionary to be posted to the Gold Coast). Upon her arrival, she founded the school 25 girls. She offered classes to the girls in catechism, reading, writing, sewing and general housekeeping at the Manse in Standfast Hall near Victoria Park in Cape Coast.

5 months after her arrival, on 8 February 1837, she died of malaria and it was not till later on that year in 1837 that the school found another head; Elizabeth Waldron. She remained at the helm for a total of 43 years and laid the foundation for what would become The Wesleyan Girls' School and Training Home.

By 1884, the school had garnered a reputation for its academic achievements. This incentivised the Methodist Church to make arrangements for the creation of a secondary division of Wesley Girls'. As a result, the then headmaster of Mfantsipim School, Reverend W.M Canell established the secondary section with 20 girls. Both the primary and secondary divisions experienced periods of closure due to financial difficulties. For a time, the secondary part was combined with Mfantsipim to become the Collegiate School before regaining independence in 1900.

=== Development in the Early 20th Century (1900s – 1920s) ===
Shortly after regaining its identity, the school was led by H. J. Ellis until 1913. During the transition period following her departure, it was administered by a group of deaconesses before Evelyn Bellamy assumed headship in 1914 until 1943. During her tenure, on 8 June 1925 Kwegyir Aggrey visited the school grounds at the Manse and penned in the logbook the now famous words, " to educate a boy is to educate an individual to educate a girl is to educate a family".

=== Mid-Century Expansion ===
In 1951, the headmistress at the time Olive Compton permanently separated the secondary section and moved to its present location at Kakumdo.The design of the new school grounds was conceptualised by Compton herself and was inspired by the appearance of the HMS Excellence, a ship.

The last missionary headmistress, Clarice Garnett, took over the leadership of the school up from 1960 until 1981. She oversaw the establishment of a Science Sixth Form in the school. Although an Arts Sixth Form was established under Olive Compton, the addition of the Science Sixth Form meant that students could complete Advanced Levels in the school eliminating the need for students to transfer to other schools.

Wesley Girls' High School was ranked 68th out of the top 100 best high schools in Africa by Africa Almanac in 2003, based upon quality of education, student engagement, strength and activities of alumnae, school profile, internet and news visibility.

== Past and Present Headmistresses ==
Headmistress	Tenure	Year group
Harriet Wrigley	1836 – 1837	— (Missionary/Founder)
Elizabeth Waldron	1837 – 1880	— (Missionary)
H. J. Ellis	1900 – 1913	— (Missionary)
Methodist Deaconesses	1913 – 1914	— (Missionary)
Evelyn Bellamy	1914 – 1943	— (Missionary)
Olive Compton	1943 – 1960	— (Missionary)
Clarice Garnett	1960 – 1981	— (Missionary)
Rosina Acheampong	1981 – 1997	1958
Nancy Thompson	1997 – 2003	1960
Betty Djokoto	2003 – 2017	1975
Kay Oppong-Ankomah	2018 – 2023	1980
Jeanette Ruby Siameh	2023 – 2026	1983
Evelyn Nana Afua Assan	2026 – present	1995

== Curriculum ==
- Home Economics
- Business
- General Science
- Visual Arts
- General Arts

== Campus and Architecture ==
=== Location and Architectural Origins ===
The school is situated in the suburb of Kakumdo in Cape Coast, roughly 5 kilometres inland from the Atlantic coastline among several other academic institutions, including the nearby University of Cape Coast.

The earliest buildings on the Kakumdo campus, including the chapel, Wallisberg ( Waldron, Ellis Bellamy and Wrigley) Houses and the original classroom blocks were designed by the British architect duo Maxwell Fry and Jane Drew in Tropical Modernism, an architectural movement that adapted European modernist building styles to fit the hot and humid climate of the then Gold Coast. Other prominent schools with buildings designed by them include Wesley Girls' sister school, Mfantsipim, and Aburi Girls' Senior High School.

=== Layout ===
The Kakumdo campus was planned around an open-ended rectangular courtyard inspired by both the British collegiate quadrangle and traditional West African compounds. On the left side of the arrangement, the Wrigley House dormitory block connected directly into single-story classrooms and teacher accommodation. At the end of this line of interconnected houses on the left stood the three-storey structure housing Bellamy House, where the top two storeys served as student dormitories while the ground floor underneath contained the original administrative offices (the Old Admin Block).

These dormitory blocks joined directly to the combined chapel, belfry and water tower which served as the architectural and communal focal point of the campus. Positioned at the highest and central section of the campus, the structure was in line with Fry and Drew’s design principle of creating focal elements within educational complexes. The chapel also featured a Greek Cross tracery pattern on its ventilating wall, made from concrete mullions and transoms, which allowed airflow while incorporating Christian symbolism into the design.

The layout of the school features walkways connecting the first four houses, and prominent public structures like the assembly hall, chapel, and old administrative block (located beneath Bellamy House). The school features long colonial-era classroom blocks with wide verandas, pitched roofs typical of mid-20th-century Ghanaian institutional architecture.

To enable cooling, the buildings were built with high-level wall vents made of wooden slats, brise-soleils to effect cooling in the girls' accommodations, and natural ventilation throughout.The buildings themselves incorporated reinforced concrete, local stone, and Tyrollean cement finishes and high-traffic areas like corridors featured terrazzo or polished concrete. Some of these features were later incorporated into the later Comabrew ( Compton, Abban and Wardbrew) Houses built in the late 1950s to 1960s.

The newest housing option; that is, the Valley Houses, Thompson-Djokoto, Garnett Acheapong, and Oppong Ankomah-Siameh—take their own turn, being primarily built throughout the 21st century and reflect more contemporary building styles in Ghana.

=== Facilities ===
Named Facility	Notes
Barbara Bowman Sick Bay	Named in honour of Miss Barbara Bowman, who taught English from 1956 and served as assistant headmistress from 1961 to 1972.

- Physics, Biology and Chemistry Labs
- Book Store
- Basketball Court
- Football Field
- Old Assembly Hall
- New Assembly Hall
- Dining Hall
- English Lab

== Controversy ==
In December 2024, the school was sued by Shafic Osman, a private legal practitioner for allegedly denying Muslim students the right to practice their faith in the school.

== Notable alumni ==
- Gisela Abbam —Global Senior Executive and Chair of Pharmacy regulator
- Rosina Acheampong—educationist, first female deputy director general of the GES, first Ghanaian headmistress of Wesley Girls High School
- Jemila Abdulai,—blogger, writer and digital marketer
- Barbara Frances Ackah-Yensu—Justice of the Supreme Court of Ghana (2022 – 2025)
- Rosamond Asiamah Nkansah—first police woman in Ghana
- Betty Acquah—feminist painter
- Adina—musician
- Sophia Ophilia Adjeibea Adinyira— Justice of the Supreme Court of Ghana (2006 – 2019)
- Dedo Difie Agyarko-Kusi—Ghana Ambassador to South Korea (2017–2021)
- Agnes Aggrey-Orleans—Ghanaian diplomat
- Zanetor Agyeman-Rawlings—member of parliament for Klottey Korle Constituency
- Mabel Agyemang—Chief Justice of the Turks and Caicos Islands, first female Chief Justice of The Gambia (2013–2014)
- Ama Ata Aidoo— award-winning author, academic, former Minister of Education of Ghana
- Sophia Akuffo—13th Chief Justice of Ghana
- Patience Akyianu—banker; formerly managing director of Barclays Bank Ghana and currently CEO
- Akosua Addai Amoo—sports journalist
- Grace Amponsah-Ababio— retired diplomat
- Abena Osei Asare—Member of Parliament for Atiwa East
- Gladys Asmah—former Minister of Fisheries
- Becca—musician
- Sylvia Boye— former Chief Executive and first female Registrar of West Africa Examinations Council
- Mary Chinery-Hesse—former civil servant and first female director of International Labor Organization, United Nations
- Melody Millicent Danquah—first female pilot in Africa
- Mercy Yvonne Debrah-Karikari—first female to be Secretary to the Cabinet of the government of Ghana
- Rita Akosua Dickson—Vice Chancellor of Kwame Nkrumah University of Science and Technology
- Florence Dolphyne—first female Professor and first female Pro-vice Chancellor of the University of Ghana, Legon
- Lydia Yaako Donkor—Commissioner of Police and the Director-General of the Criminal Investigations Department (CID) of the Ghana Police Service
- Efua Dorkenoo—activist
- Brigitte Dzogbenuku—Presidential candidate (2020) & Vice Presidential candidate (2016) for the Progressive People's Party
- Constance Edjeani-Afenu— first female brigadier general of the Ghana Armed Forces, Deputy Military Adviser to Ghana's permanent Mission in New York
- Sophia Rosetta Bernasko-Essah — Justice of the Supreme Court of Ghana
- Mary Grant—Ghana's first female council of state member; first alumna to be a medical doctor
- Afua Adwo Jectey Hesse— chief executive officer of the Korle Bu Teaching Hospital
- Avril Lovelace-Johnson— Justice of the Supreme Court of Ghana
- Jennifer Koranteng—model and fashion designer
- Angela Kyerematen-Jimoh— business leader and Microsoft's Financial Strategic Partnership Lead for Africa
- Eva Lokko—engineer and former managing director of the Ghana Broadcasting Corporation
- Alima Mahama,—lawyer and former former Minister for Women and Children's Affairs
- Takyiwa Manuh—Ghanaian academic and author
- Joy Henrietta Mensa-Bonsu—a law professor and Justice of the Supreme Court of Ghana
- Akosua Manu—deputy CEO of National Youth Authority
- Joyce Bawah Mogtari—Lawyer and Former Deputy Minister of Transport
- Emma Morrison—television personality and media professional
- Victoria Nyarko—Ghanaian politician, member of parliament in the first republic
- Jane Naana Opoku-Agyemang—first female Vice-Chancellor of a state University in Ghana, First female Vice-President of Ghana
- Rose Constance Owusu— former justice of the Supreme Court of Ghana (2008 – 2014)
- Deborah Owusu-Bonsu—musician, television presenter and model
- Martha Akyaa Pobee—Diplomat, Permanent Member to the United Nations,
- Lucy Quist— first Ghanaian woman to become the CEO of a multinational telecommunications company in Ghana
- Mabel Simpson— fashion designer
- Hanna Tetteh— former Minister for Trade and Industry and former Minister for Foreign Affairs
- Gertrude Torkornoo— 15th Chief Justice of Ghana
- Yvonne Tsikata—international economist and first Ghanaian woman to become vice president at the World Bank
- Julia Osei Tutu— Ghanaian lawyer, philanthropist; wife of Asantehene, Otumfuo Nana Osei Tutu II
- Georgina Theodora Wood—former police prosecution officer, first female Chief Justice of Ghana
- Nana Oye Mansa Yeboaa—first female deputy Governor of the Bank of Ghana, and former Ghanaian diplomat
- Vida Yeboah— Minister of State in the Rawlings government, former Headmistress of Mfanstiman Girls' Secondary School
