= Svanikier =

Svanikier is a Ghanaian surname. Notable people with the surname include:

- Johanna Odonkor Svanikier, Ghanaian diplomat
- Thomas Svanikier (born 1960), Ghanaian entrepreneur
