= Akosua Manu =

Ghanaian social marketer and a political activist

Akosua Asaa Manu is a Ghanaian social marketer and a political activist. She is currently a deputy chief executive officer of the Ghana National Youth Authority. Prior to her appointment she was the deputy director of communications at the office of the First Lady of Ghana, Rebecca Akufo-Addo.

== Early life and education ==
Manu had her secondary education at Wesley Girls' Senior High School and then proceeded to the University of Ghana where she obtained a bachelor's degree in economics.

== Career ==
Starting off her career as a social marketer and a banker, Manu worked with Ghana Commercial Bank (GCB) and Max International. She got recruited to work as a systems and back office administrator at GCB after serving as a national service personnel. In 2012, she started a small fashion and clothing business and in 2014, she left GCB to work at Max International.

== Politics ==
She is a member of the New Patriotic Party. In 2016, Manu joined the campaign team of the New Patriotic Party working under the social media division. As a result, she was appointed to the office of the First Lady to serve as the deputy Director of Communications in 2017. In that same year, she joined the New Patriotic Party's communication team.

On December 2, 2023, Manu, popularly known as Kozie, won the New Patriotic Party's parliamentary primaries and was elected as the candidate for the Adentan constituency to contest on the governing party's ticket in the 2024 general election. She polled 814 votes, closely followed by Kwasi Obeng Fosu the runner-up who got 638 votes.

== Personal life ==
She is married with two children.
