= Wesley Girls High School =

Wesley Girls High School may refer to:

- Wesley Girls' Senior High School, Ghana
- Wesley Girls High School, Secunderabad, India
