= National Youth Employment Program =

Agency overview
- Formed: 2006
- Jurisdiction: Republic of Ghana
- Headquarters: Ghana
- Parent agency: Ministry of Youth and Sports (Ghana)

The National Youth Employment Program (NYEP) of Ghana was established in 2006 by the John Kufuor administration. It is an agency under the Ministry of Youth and Sports.

== Youth unemployment ==
Youth unemployment in Ghana is a major issue in the country. 2011 World Bank country statistics for youth unemployment in Ghana found that 65 percent of Ghanaian youth are unemployed. The Ghana Trades Union Congress stated in 2011 that yearly youth unemployment in Ghana increases by 250,000.

== History/Historical antecedent ==
The NYEP was created in October 2006 to address the country's youth unemployment with the aim of empowering Ghanaian youth so they could add positively to the socio-economic and sustainable development of the nation.

== Functions of NYEP ==
The functions of the program are:

1. to offer employment to the Ghanaian youth
2. to offer requisite working experience to post- national Service personnel
3. to provide Ghanaian youth with employable skills

== NYEP personnel ==
The NYEP employs Ghanaian youth between the ages of 18 and 35 years who are literate, illiterate, able and or disabled.

== Modules of NYEP ==
The program started with nine modules in 2006. New modules are regularly created to promote the program's objectives. The modules train unemployed youth for service. The nine modules which the program was started upon are: Youth in Security Services, Youth in Fire Prevention, Youth in Immigration, Youth in Agri-Business, Youth in Health Extension, Youth in Waste and Sanitation, Youth in Paid Internship, Youth in Community Teaching Assistants, Youth in Trades and Vocation, Youth in Eco-Brigade, Youth in Information Communication Technology

== Sponsors ==
The program receives support from the government of Ghana as well as international agencies. One international agency that supports the program is the World Bank. In January, 2011 it was announced that the bank was going to assist the NYEP with funds from a multimillion-dollar facility to support the Youth in entrepreneurship module. The entrepreneurship module trains the youth in formulating and implementing various strategies for development. The module has sub section in ICT, agriculture and the oil and gas industry. World bank in February 2011 provided $65 million to help train the youth in entrepreneurship module.

== Successes ==
In May 2007, the program had employed 95,000 youths in the various modules. In February 2011, it was announced that the program had recruited, trained and employed over 108,000 unemployed youth in 15 employment modules.

== Future of NYEP ==
In February, 2011 a new three-year strategic plan developed by NYEP was announced. The plan estimated that through the implementation of new modules and NYEP policies, the program would engage 400,000 youth by the end of 2013.

== See also ==
- National Youth Authority (NYA)
