= Akosua K. Darkwah =

Ghanaian female sociologist

Akosua K. Darkwah is a Ghanaian sociologist who serves as Professor of Sociology at the University of Ghana. She is recognized for her research on gender, women in the workforce, globalization, and social change in sub-Saharan Africa.

== Early life and education ==
Akosua Keseboa Darkwah was born on 10 February 1974 to Kofi and Felicia Darkwah, while her father was a visiting Professor at Boston University, Massachusetts. She later attended Wesley Girls' High School, Cape Coast.

She later moved to the United States after secondary school to pursue higher education at Vassar College in New York, where she earned her Bachelor of Arts in Psychology and Sociology in 1996. She later pursued her graduate studies at the University of Wisconsin-Madison, United States, where she received a Master's degree in 1998 and a doctorate in Sociology in 2002. Her research focused on the experiences of Ghanaian market women operating within the context of economic globalization.

== Career ==
Akosua Darkwah, after completing her doctorate, joined the Department of Sociology at the University of Ghana, where she teaches courses in gender studies, labor sociology, globalization, and feminist theory.

She is currently Professor of Sociology and has served as Dean of the Department of Sociology. She has also held the role of Head of the School of Information and Communication Studies in the same institution.

From 2012 to 2016, she served as the Director of the Centre for Gender Studies and Advocacy (CEGENSA) at the University of Ghana, where she was the supervisor of the center's research program and chaired its research committee.

== Research ==
- Burkina Faso
