= Nana Oye Mansa Yeboaa =

Ghanaian politician

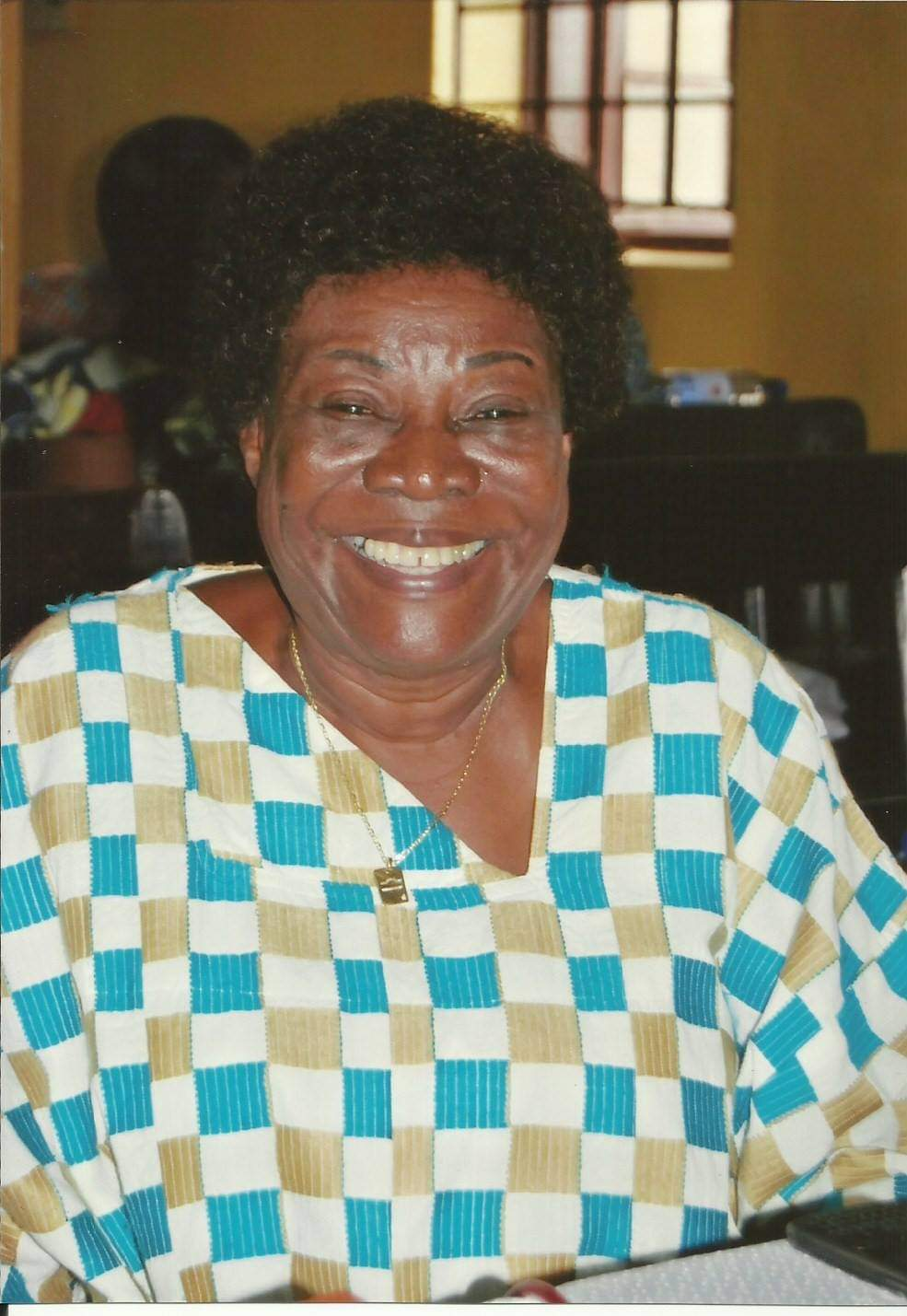
Dompiahene of Akuapem Traditional Area

Nana Oye Mansa Yeboaa, also known by the name Mrs. Theresa Owusu, is a Ghanaian traditional ruler, politician, public servant and diplomat. She is a woman chief in the Eastern Region of Ghana. She holds the title of the Dompiahene of the Akuapem Traditional Area. She was the deputy minister for Finance and Economic Planning, the first female deputy governor of the Bank of Ghana, and Ghana's ambassador to Belgium and the European Union.

== Personal life ==
She was born on 26 September 1938 to Kate Oye Ntow Ofosu and Eric Perigrino Nelson. She had her secondary education at Wesley Girls High School and her tertiary education at the University of Ghana. Nana Oye Mansa Yeboaa is the sister of the late Vida Amaadi Yeboah, who was once Minister for Tourism in the Rawlings government.

== Career ==
Nana Oye Mansa Yeboaa held the position of second deputy governor of the Bank of Ghana from 1989 -1997, being the first female to be appointed to this position. From 1994 -1997, she served as a member of the board of directors of the Social Security and National Insurance Trust (SSNIT), she was also a member of the Board of Trustees of the Ghana College of Physicians and Surgeons in 2007. Additionally, she has held the positions of Deputy Minister at the Ministry of Finance and Economic Planning, Ambassador of Ghana to Belgium and to the European Union. She spearheaded the move to establish the Ghana Women Fund, and served as its first board chairman after it was founded in 2001. In 2009, she was appointed by former President John Evans Atta Mills as a member of the Board of the Ghana Institute of Management and Public Administration (GIMPA).

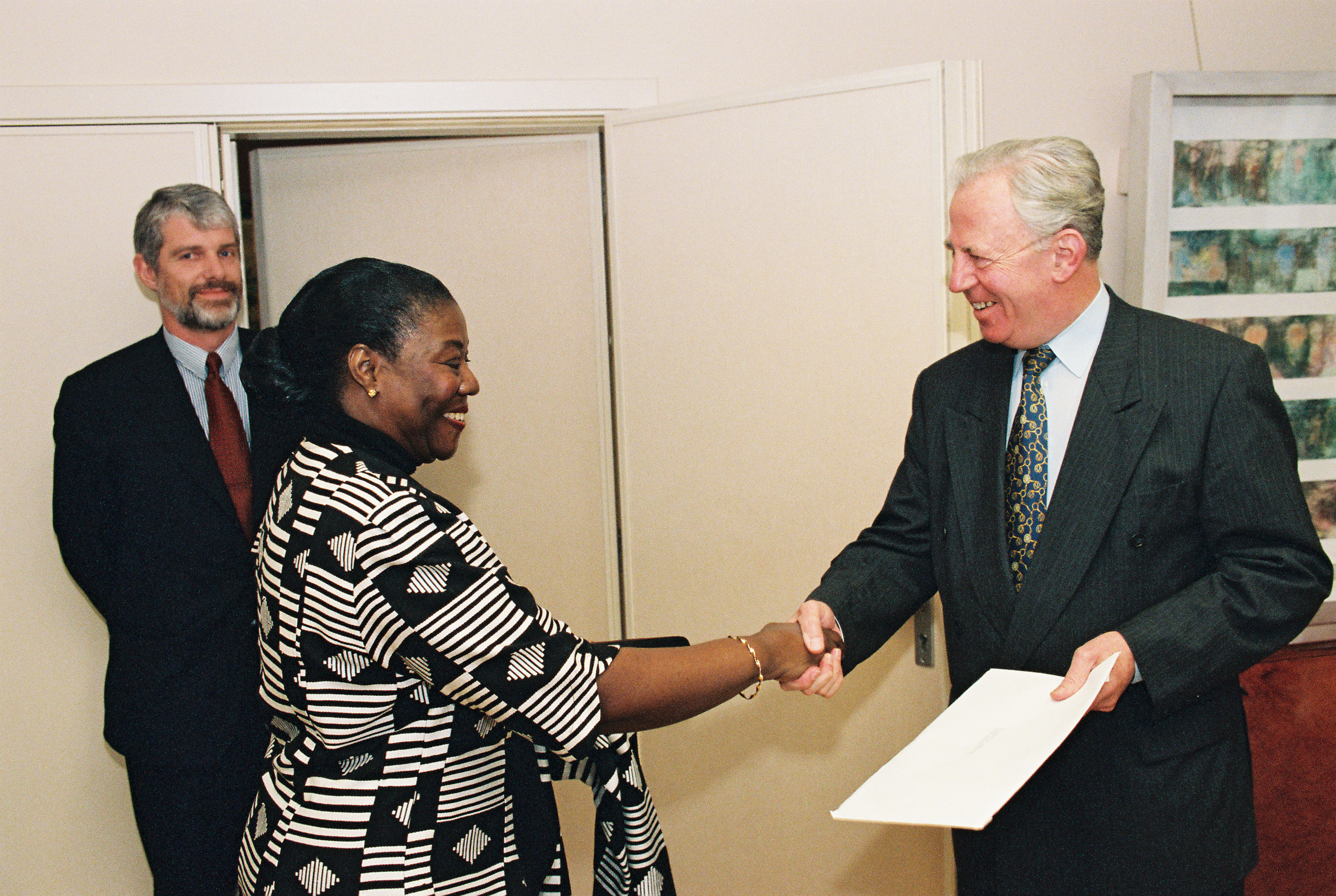
Presenting her credentials at the European Commission (1998)

== Developmental works ==
She is the founder and Lead coordinator of the Akuapem Community Foundation, which she established in 2005, with the aim of tackling issues of education, gender, youth, morality, public affairs, and disability needs in her traditional area.
