= Edd Branson =

Zimbabwean charismatic Christian leader

- Born: Edwin Mutongwizo; 18 July 1988 (age 37); Harare, Zimbabwe
- Occupations: Preacher, philanthropist
- Years active: 2017-present
- Known for: Clergyman

Edd Branson is a prominent Zimbabwean charismatic Christian leader, philanthropist and entrepreneur.

== Early background ==
Born Edwin Mutongwizo in 1988 in Harare, Branson grew up in Warren Park suburb where he attended his early education.

== Biography ==
Edd Branson founded Jesus Generation International Ministries in 2017 which has some branches in Zimbabwe, United Kingdom, South Africa, India and Australia, he became popular around the country through his prophesy predictions.

Branson founded The Edd Branson Foundation through which he has received several recognitions and awards. He was appointed by the Global Diplomatic Council as director commissioner of African Culture Diversity and Entrepreneurship. In 2019, he received an honorary doctorate for Philanthropy and Humanitarian Leadership from The Global Academy Of social sciences of India.

== Recognition ==
- 40 Influential Zimbabweans under 40 of 2017
- Top 100 Zimbabwean Leaders under 40 of 2019
- Excellence in Leadership and Human Capital Development 2019 - African Achievers Awards, Houses of Parliament London
- Global Excellence In Leadership 2019 - Peace Achievers Awards, Nigeria
- Peace Ambassador of the year 2019 - Centre for Peace Studies, Sri Lanka
- Leadership Award 2019 - Pan African Leadership and Entrepreneurship Development Centre, Abu Dhabi
- 15th Ambassador, World Habitat Ambassadors Foundation International (WHAF Int’l Hall of fame).
- Director, African Cultural Diversity and Entrepreneurship for the Global Diplomatic Council
- Commissioner, International Commission for Diplomacy

== Further read ==
- Most Influential Zimbabweans 2017
- NewsDay Zimbabwe live feed
- 40 Influential Christian leaders in Zimbabwe
