= Princess Akawor Dolor =

Nigerian entrepreneur

- Born: Akawor Dolor; November 3, 1989 (age 36); Lagos State, Nigeria
- Education: University of Port Harcourt; Freedom University and Technology Seminary
- Occupation: Entrepreneur
- Years active: 2020–present
- Organization: The Princess Thyroid Awareness Initiative

Princess Akawor Dolor (born 3 November 1989), is a Nigerian fashion entrepreneur and philanthropist. she is the founder of LuxeByGlamoholic, a fashion luxury company and The Princess Thyroid Awareness Initiative foundation.In 2025, she was among the 10 women profiled by The Daily Times Women's Hub in celebration of International Women's Day due to her work on the health awareness.

== Early life and education ==
Akawor Dolor was born on 3 November 1989 in Lagos State, Nigeria, and is from Rivers State. She is the first of four children. Her father was an engineer and her mother was a businesswoman.

She graduated in Biomedical Laboratory Technology earning a Bachelor of Science degree from University of Port Harcourt. She also holds a master's and Ph.D. at Freedom University and Technology Seminary in Pottstown, Pennsylvania, United States.

== Career ==
Akawor's mission is to help promote thyroid health awareness and provide accurate medical information, and support individuals living with thyroid disorders through education, advocacy, and community engagement. Akawor initially studied Biomedical Laboratory Technology before moving into the fashion industry. Akawor founded LuxeByGlamoholic, a luxury fashion business, in 2010 and The Princess Thyroid Awareness Initiative (PTAI) in 2022. She received the Luxury Fashion Retail Brand of the Year award at the Scream Awards. Akawor was also recognised by CEO Africa as one of the 10 Outstanding Young CEOs in Nigeria. In 2025, she was given an award for Global Excellence at the House of Lords in Westminster, London, United Kingdom. and African Achievers Awards in the Trailblazing Entrepreneurs and Under 40 Entrepreneurs category Awards in Tanzania. On 5 May 2026, she was recognised by the Pan African Youth Leadership Foundation through its League of Excellence. On 7 September 2026 she won award for Social Impact & Humanitarian Leadership at the University of Oxford. On 9 October 2026, She was featured in the 100 Global Impact Personalities Summit.

== Awards and recognition ==
In October 2025, Akawor received the United International Peace and Governance Council (UNIPGC) and Jewel Howard Taylor Leadership Excellence and Distinguished Personality Award at the Global Leadership Investment Summit & Peace Awards (GLISPA).

- Award for Global Excellence, House of Lords, Palace of Westminster (UK), 2025
- African Achievers Awards International for Trailblazing entrepreneurs (Tanzania), 2025
- The Pan African Youth Leadership Foundation's "League of Excellence 2026"
- African Achievers Awards for Under 40 Entrepreneurs
- 100 Global Impact Personalities Summit (Nigeria), 2026
- Distinguished Humanitarian Leadership Award At University of Oxford (United Kingdom), 2026
