= Tsikata =

Tsikata is a surname. Notable people with the surname include:

- Dzodzi Tsikata, Ghanaian feminist, academic and professor
- Kojo Tsikata, captain in Ghanaian Provisional National Defence Council
- Tsatsu Tsikata (born 1950), Ghanaian academic and lawyer
- Yvonne Tsikata, Ghanaian economist
