= Rafiq Salam =

Ghanaian journalist

Abdul-Salam Abdul-Rafiq is a Ghanaian journalist and the Upper West Regional correspondent for Joy FM. He is known for his unique reports sign outs, which usually ends with Wa prolonged Wa-a-a-a-a!. In 2012, he was among the awardees for the Upper West Region's Young Achievers award including Alban Bagbin by the National Youth Authority due to his reportage.

== Early life ==
Abdul-Rafiq hails from Wa in the Upper West Region in Ghana and he is the 24th child of his father.

== Personal life ==
In December 2015, Abdul-Rafiq married Shahida Seidu Braimah, Princess of Guli and also daughter of Seidu Braimah. Abdul-Rafiq is a Muslim.

== Awards and honors ==
In September 2024, Abdul-Rafiq was named the Upper West Regional Best Journalist at the Maiden Edition of Upper West Journalists Awards Organized by the Ghana Journalists Association.

In 2023, he was also named the best Health Reporter for the Year.

In 2018, he was also adjudged the best journalist in a feature story in the northern sector of Ghana on the SNV Voice for Change Programme.
