= Lawrencia Dziwornu =

Ghanaian politician

Hon. Lawrencia Dziwornu MP

Member of Parliament for Akwapim South
- Incumbent
- Assumed office 7 January 2025
- President: John Mahama
- Preceded by: Osei Bonsu Amoah

Personal details
- Party: National Democratic Congress
- Education: Aburi Girls' Senior High School; University of Ghana; Robert Gordon University
- Occupation: Businesswoman,Politician

Hon. Lawrencia Dziwornu, born on 10 May 1987, is a Ghanaian politician who is a member of the National Democratic Congress (NDC). She is a member of parliament for the Akwapim South constituency in the Ninth Parliament of the Fourth Republic.

== Education ==
Dziwornu completed her secondary education at Aburi Girls Senior High School in 2003. She later obtained a Bachelor of Arts degree from the University of Ghana in 2008. In 2014, she earned a Master of Science degree from the Robert Gordon University.

== Career ==
Dziwornu is a business woman and currently runs Aabur Enterprise as its Chief executive officer.

== Politics ==
In May 2023, Lawrencia Dziwornu stood for the National Democratic Congress primaries in the Akwapim South Constituency. She won the primaries by polling 470 votes out of 906 votes defeating her main contender who had 340 votes.

In the 2024 General Elections, Dziwornu contested the Akwapim South constituency against Eric Yeboah Apeadu, the candidate for the New Patriotic Party (NPP). She secured 15,438 votes (50.22%), narrowly defeating Eric Yeboah Apeadu, who garnered 15,304 votes (49.78%). This victory marked the first time in over a decade that the National Democratic Congress (NDC) captured the parliamentary seat in the constituency.
