= Francisca Ashietey-Odunton =

Ghanaian diplomat and journalist

Amb. Francisca Ashietey-Odunton
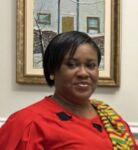
- Ashietey-Odunton in 2024

Ghana's Ambassador to Turkey
- In office 2021–2024
- President: Nana Akuffo-Addo
- Preceded by: Salma Frances Mancell-Egala
- Succeeded by: Sheikh Abdul Nasiru-Deen

Personal details
- Born: Francisca Ashietey Ghana
- Party: New Patriotic Party
- Spouse: Olu Christopher Odunton
- Children: 2
- Education: Aburi Girls' Senior High School; Kwame Nkrumah University of Science and Technology; London School of Economics; United Nations University
- Occupation: Broadcaster, diplomat

Francisca Ashietey-Odunton (née Ashietey) is a Ghanaian journalist, broadcaster and diplomat. She was the Acting Director-General of the Ghana Broadcasting Corporation. She served as Ghana's ambassador to Turkey from 2021 -2024. Before that, she served as Ghana's High Commissioner to Kenya from 2017 to 2021.

== Early life ==
Francisca Ashietey attended Aburi Girls' Senior High School for her Ordinary and Advanced Level Certificates. She attended the Kwame Nkrumah University of Science and Technology where she obtained a Bachelors of Arts degree in Social Sciences with a major in English.

She is a barrister at law with 16 years of experience, having been called to the Ghana Bar after obtaining her LLB from the Ghana School of Law in 1997. She holds a master's degree in media and communication from the London School of Economics. She also obtained a graduate certificate in human rights/international cooperation at the United Nations University in Tokyo, Japan.

== Career ==
Francisca Ashietey-Odunton has over 20 years' experience as a broadcaster with the Ghana Broadcasting Corporation (GBC). She joined the Ghana Broadcasting Corporation in 1990 as a senior production assistant attached to the Production Division where she worked on various programmes including Kyekyekule, Children's Own, Adult Education and Country Music. She was also a TV presenter. She rose through the ranks as producer to director, after which she was transferred to the TV newsroom in 1994. She served in various capacities in the newwsroom such as a news reader, editor and presidential correspondent for eight years. She later became Chief Editor and was transferred to the legal division as Senior Legal Officer. Ashietey-Odunton has covered international conferences, including the African Union Summit, Ecowas Summit and World Food Summit.

She was first appointed Deputy Director-General of the Ghana Broadcasting Corporation in November 2013. She was subsequently made the Acting Director-General of the Ghana Broadcasting Corporation in May, 2016.

== Ambassadorial appointment ==
On Wednesday, 2 August 2017, the president of Ghana, Nana Akuffo-Addo, named Francisca Ashietey-Odunton as Ghana's high commissioner to Kenya. She was among four other distinguished Ghanaians who were named to head various diplomatic Ghanaian missions in the world. Even though she was a high commissioner to Kenya, she had oversighted roles over four other countries including Rwanda, Burundi, Tanzania and Uganda. Under her guidance, Rwanda established its first diplomatic mission in Accra, Ghana in 2020.

In Kenya, Ashietey-Odunton was also Ghana's permanent representative to the United Nations offices in Nairobi which hosts the organisation's two bodies in sub-sahara Africa – the United Nations Environment Programme (UNEP) and the United Nations Human Settlements Programme. As Ghana's Permanent Representative, she also served as Chair of the Committee of Permanent Representatives (CPR) Bureau of UNEP and oversaw the fourth United Nations Environment Assembly and also served as Africa's Representative and Rapporteur of the UNEP CPR Bureau.

In 2021, she was reassigned to head Ghana's embassy in Turkey. She presented her letter of credentials to the President of Turkey in September that same year.

== Personal life ==
Ashietey-Odunton is married to Olu Christopher Odunton; the couple has two daughters.
