= Sylvia Anie =

Ghanaian chemist

Sylvia Josephine Anie FRSC is a Ghanaian chemist known for her work in magnetic resonance imaging and international policy making.

== Education ==
Anie is a graduate of Aburi Girls’ Senior High School. She completed her doctoral dissertation in 1990 at the University of Manchester.

== Career ==
Anie's doctoral research developed a method for magnetic resonance imaging (MRI) which was subsequently patented. Using a polysiloxane contrast medium, Anie obtained images of the structure and function of the gastrointestinal tract in a living organism. This method made it possible to perform MRI analysis of the gut without the side effects of metal-based contrast agents.

After receiving her doctorate, Anie left laboratory research to work in international policy formulation and strategic planning. While serving as the Director of the Social Transformations Programmes Division for Commonwealth Secretariat, she addressed the United Nations General Assembly in a statement on HIV/AIDS treatment and prevention in the Commonwealth of Nations.

Anie is currently the Head of Policy Advocacy for RESULTS, an organization working to eliminate global poverty.

== Awards and recognition ==
- Anie was named a Fellow of the Royal Society of Chemistry in 2013.
- In 2015, she received an award from the Old Students Association of Aburi Girls’ Senior High School recognizing her contributions to scientific knowledge.
- Anie was named an African Science Hero by Planet Earth Institute for her research, public health work, and efforts to promote health and education access for women.
