= Senyuiedzorm Awusi Adadevoh =

Ghanaian photojournalist

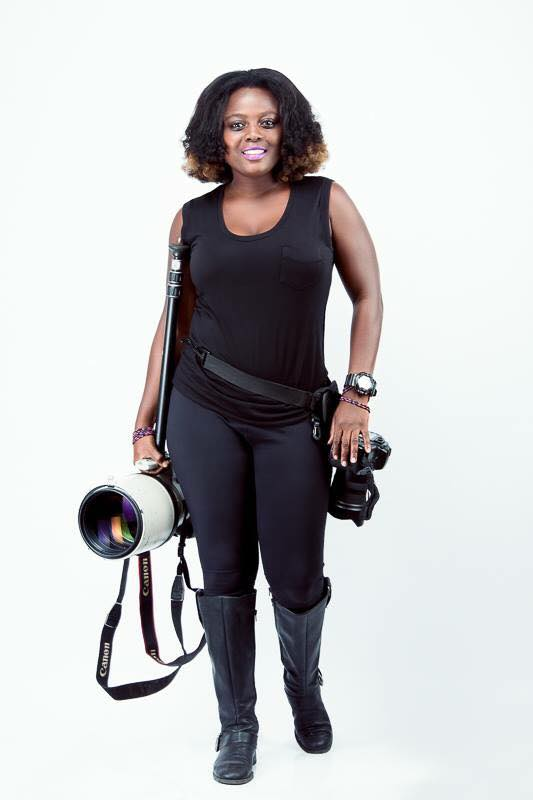
- Born: Senyuiedzorm Awusi Adadevoh; Dzelukope, Volta Region of Ghana

Senyuiedzorm Awusi Adadevoh (born in Dzelukope, Volta Region of Ghana) is a Ghanaian sports photographer and photojournalist based in Accra, Ghana. Her career as a photographer began in 1999, eventually transitioning into sports photography in the mid-2000s. In 2008, Adadevoh began working with the Black Stars, the senior national football team of Ghana. Adadevoh is the founder of the photography bank Solvers Ghana, the photography and photojournalism companies Sports Unlimited and Society Unlimited.

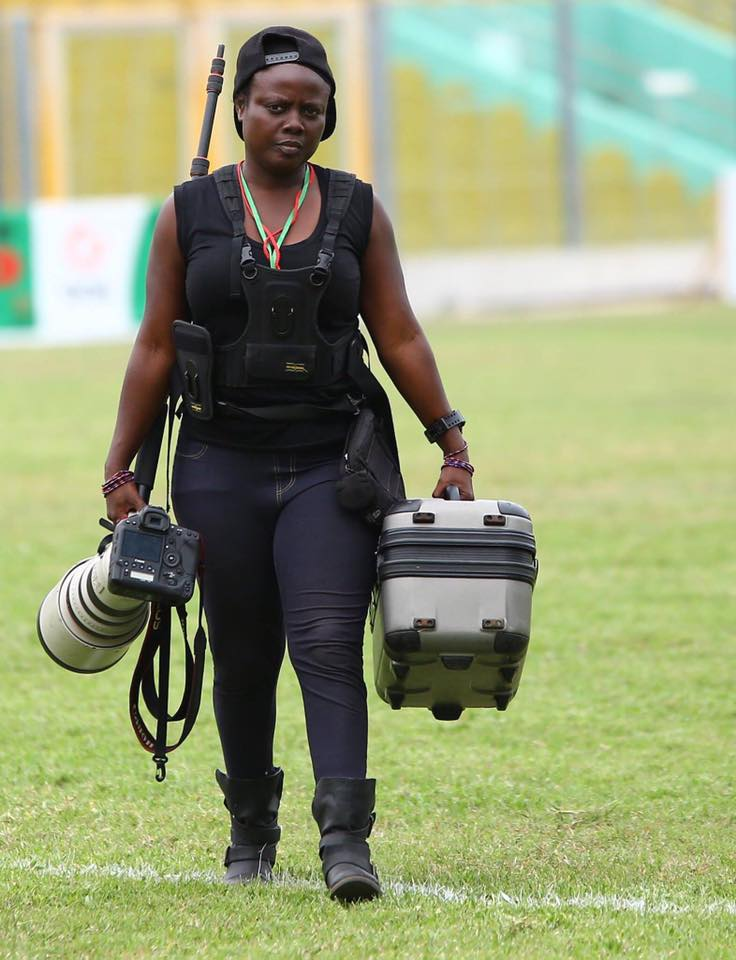
Senyuiedzorm Awusi Adadavoh after covering a football match at the Accra Sports Stadium

== Early life ==
Adadevoh attended the University of Ghana Primary School Legon and went on to attend Aburi Girls' Senior High School. Adadevoh graduated from the African Institute of Journalism (now the African University College of Communications) with a Diploma in Communications Studies. Adadevoh is a self-taught photographer who initially wanted to be a videographer before turning to photography.

== Career ==
Adadevoh has shot at some of the world's major sporting events, including two Olympic Games, two FIFA World Cups (South Africa 2010 and Brazil 2014 respectively) and six African Nations Cups between 2008-2017.

Adadevoh has also shot a number of well-known figures in sports, such as Floyd Mayweather Jr. and his father Floyd Sr., covering the Mayweather vs. McGregor fight in August 2017.

=== Other projects ===
- 2005-1999 Covered friendly charity match between Ghana’s top ex-local players and ex-foreign players. Freelancing for a Ghanaian base societal life style magazine “Enjoy Accra” covering fashion shows to children’s parties, high societal functions, political demonstrations, independence celebrations and more.
- 2006 Internship at the Ghana News Agency as second in-house photographer.
- 2007 Photographed and organized “The Legacy Of War” photo exhibition in aid of a non-profit making charity organization Self Help Initiative at the Bujumbura Refugee camp.
- 2008 Freelancing for BBC African Sports in covering the BBC 2007 player of the year in Togo. Freelancing for KICK-OFF Ghana. Covered the Beijing 2008 Summer Olympics as the only Ghanaian photographer. Covered the 2008 Africa Cup of Nation as the only Sub-Saharan female photographer. Established and published “Sports Unlimited”. Did national service at Citi FM in Accra as in-house photographer.
- 2009 Author and publisher “Proudly Ghanaian” a coffee table photo book consisting of artistic photography.
- 2010 Covered the South Africa 2010 FIFA World Cup. Contributed in a book “Hopes & dreams” by a group of senior broadcasters such as Farayi Mungazi of BBC, Piers Edwards, Mark Gleeson and others. Contracted by Vodafone Ghana to cover a group of Ghanaian Premier League Fans from Ghana to London for a Premier League final. Covered the 2010 Africa Cup of Nations.
- 2011 Author and publisher "the Hand of Suarez" a photo calendar for 2011. Covered sports activities such as golf, football, polo, swimming, baseball and other track activities for my sports journal Sports Unlimited. Shot company profile for senior executives of Ghana’s leading mobile phone company MTN. Covered the 2010 African Football Player by CAF in Cairo, Egypt.
- 2012 Contracted by Publicies Ghana to shoot Guinness icons the Ghana senior national team The Black Stars. Contracted by the Confederation of African Football (CAF) the 2011 African Football Player by CAF in Accra.
- 2013 Covered some of the 2014 FIFA qualifiers. Covered the Ghana Premier league (2013/2014 season). Contracted by advertising agency Fire House to shoot their CLIENT brand GLOS’ icons. Covered 2013 African Cup Of Nations.
- 2014 Covered the 2014 FIFA World Cup in Brazil. Covered the Ghana Premier league (2014/2015 season). Covered some of the 2015 AFCON qualifiers.
- 2015 Covered the 2015 African Cup of Nations (AFCON) staged in Equatorial Guinea. Covered the Ghana Premier League (2015/2016) season. Covered some international football matches including charity games. Covered some international boxing bouts in Ghana and in the United States, including the Floyd Mayweather Jnr and Andre Berto fight in Las Vegas.
- 2016 Covered some of the 2017 AFCON qualifiers. Covered the Ghana Premier League (2016) season. Covered the GLO CAF Awards (2015) in Nigeria. Covered some international boxing fights in Ghana. Covered some of the FIFA 2018 World Cup qualifiers preliminary stages. Covered some part of the Ghana Women’s football league and FA Cup matches. Covered part of the 2016 UPAC basketball championship. Covered the 2016 African hockey championship southern zone in Ghana. Covered the ordinary congress of the Ghana Football Association.
- 2017 Covered the 2017 African Cup of Nations (AFCON ) staged in Gabon. Covered the CAF 2017 General Assembly elections that led to electing Ahmad Ahmad as the new CAF president. Covered the 2018 FIFA World Cup final draw in Russia. Covered the swearing-in of the 5th President of the 4th Republic of Ghana, H.E Nana Addo Dankwa Akufo-Addo. Covered the Floyd Mayweather Jnr and Conor McGregor fight in Las Vegas. Interviewed Floyd Mayweather Jnr live via facebook at his TMT boxing gym in Nevada, Las-Vegas. Covered some of the FIFA 2018 World Cup qualifiers. Covered some of the 2017 Major League Soccer (MLS) games. Covered part of the 2017 Ghana Premier League season. Covered some of the Ghana Women’s League. Covered the extraordinary congress of the Ghana Football Association in Accra. Covered some boxing fights in Ghana. Covered a local swimming competition.
- 2018 Covered the Aiteo CAF awards (2017) hosted in Ghana --- January. Covered the WBO interim Super Bantamweight fight between Isaac Dogboe and Cesar Juarez staged in Ghana ---January. Covered the WBO super bantamweight title between Isaac Dogboe and Jessie Magdaleno in Liacouras Center, Philadelphia.

=== Exhibitions ===
- She held her first exhibition title "The Legacy of War" which highlighted the destructive nature of wars and the plight of refugees.
- Leading Ghanaian photo journalist Senyuiedzorm auctions pictures to buy balls for deprived communities.

== Awards ==
- Ghana's Best Sports Photographer at the Sports Excellence Awards.
- Top 50 Most Influential Young Ghanaians.
- Senyueidzorm Awusi Adadevoh awarded by WISA-Ghana.
- Meet some of Ghana's most influential women in sports.

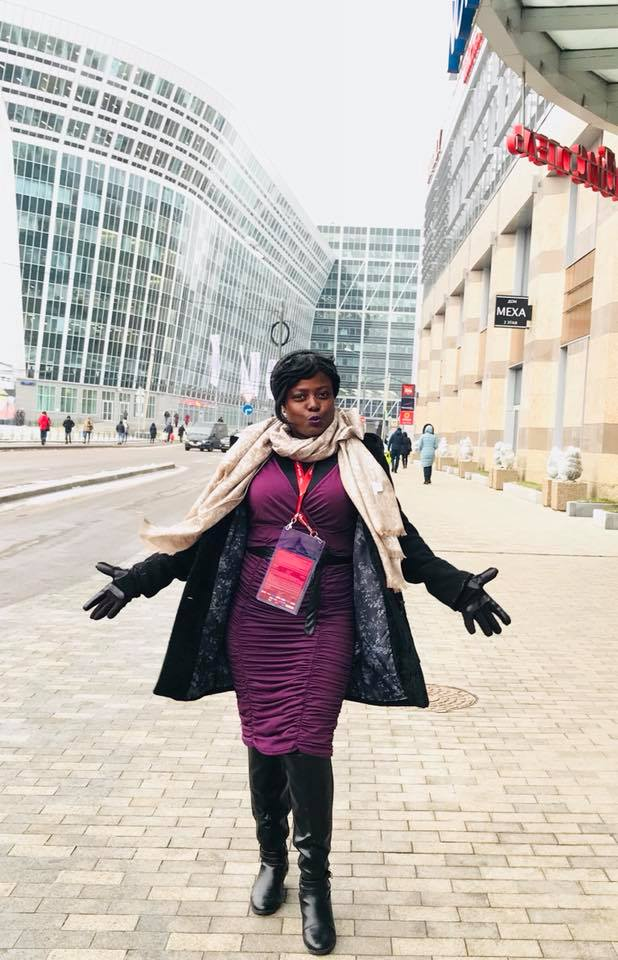
Senyuiedzorm Awusi Adadavoh covering the 2018 FIFA World Cup draw in Moscow, Russia
