= Rosina Acheampong =

Ghanaian educationist

Rosina Acheampong was a Ghanaian educationist. She was the first female deputy director general of the Ghana Education Service and a former headmistress of Wesley Girls High School. On 13 April 2019, she was awarded with a lifetime achievement award for her contribution to girl-child education in the country by Glitz Africa at the Labadi Beach Hotel.

== Education ==
She gained admission into Wesley Girls’ High School in 1954 and there she had her secondary education. She later furthered at the University of Ghana and the University of Cape Coast where she acquired a bachelor's degree in French and a professional course (PGCE) respectively.

== Career ==
She has taught in different schools including Wesley Girls High School, Prempeh College, Tamale Senior High School and University Practice Senior High School. After serving three years as the assistant headmistress, she became the first alumni and non-missionary Ghanaian Headmistress of the school, a position she held for sixteen years. Then she was promoted to be the deputy director general of the Ghana Education Service, making her the first woman to hold this position.

== Family ==
Acheampong has three children.

== Awards ==
- 2015 - She was honoured with the Legendary Woman of the Year award at the Ghana Women Awards
- 2019 - She received a Lifetime Achievement Award from Glitz Africa
