= Emma Morrison =

Ghanaian media personality

- Born: 5 June
- Education: Wesley Girls' High School; Tarkwa Secondary School; Ghana Institute of Journalism

Emma Morrison is a Ghanaian television personality and media professional.

She started her media career, working with TV3 Ghana when the station was established in 1997 as a news reporter and a newscaster.

== Early life ==
She was born on 5 June and is the third child of her mother and the seventh of her father. Her father was Jacob Morrison and her mother is Victoria Morrison. Her father has thirteen children, eleven girls and two boys.

== Education ==
Morrison went to two primary schools in London, United Kingdom: Dollis Junior School in Mill Hill, and Childs Hill School in Barnet. After moving to Ghana, she studied at Goldfields Preparatory School, Wesley Girls' Senior High School and Tarkwa Secondary School. She went on to the Ghana Institute of Journalism.

== Career ==
She started her media work with TV3 in 1997 as a reporter/newscaster, rising through the ranks to become the general manager for news and sports at TV3.

She later became the editor of Joy News TV.

She is the group head of business programming, radio, TV, IM at Multimedia Group Ltd and doubles as consultant, executive producer for News Generation. Morrison joined Gold Fields Ghana as corporate affairs head.

== Awards ==
She has won awards: Newscaster of the Year, TV Personality of the Year, and her news programme News 360 won TV News Programme of the Year. In 2019 she was named the Corporate Personality of the Year at the Glitz Ghana Women of the Year Honours.
