= Ivy Barley =

Ghanaian social entrepreneur

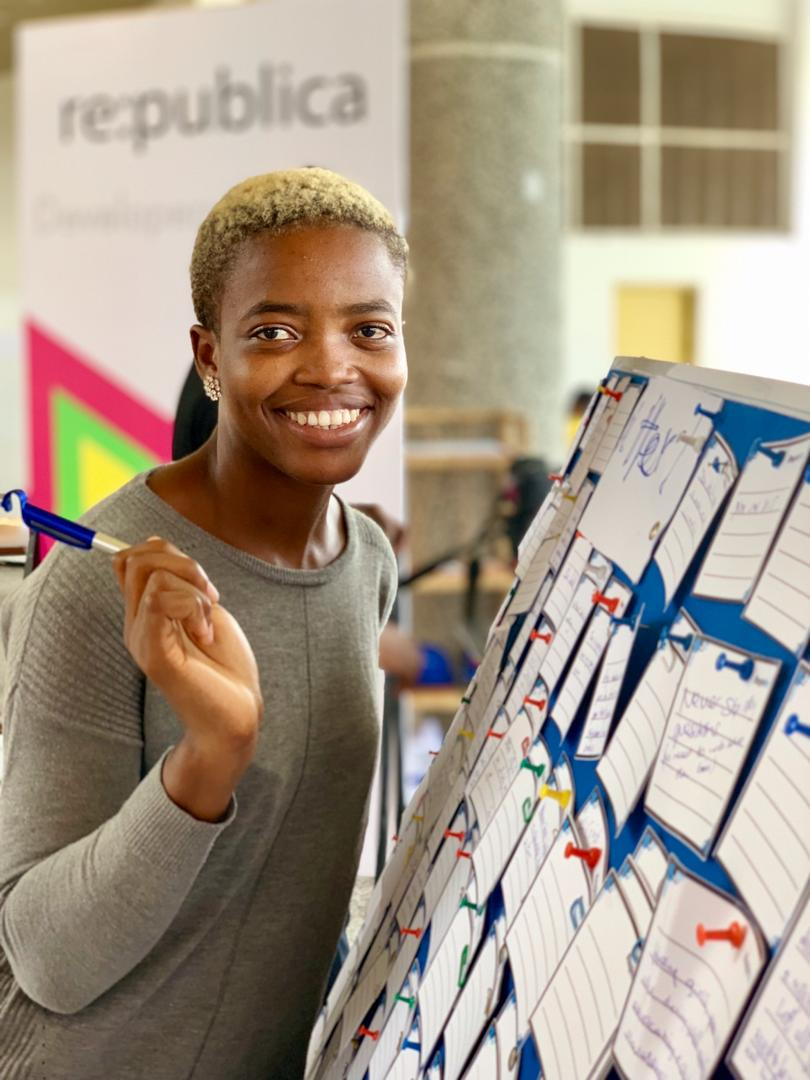
- Education: Kwame Nkrumah University of Science and Technology (MPhil., BSc.), Aburi Girls' Senior High School

Ivy Barley is a Ghanaian entrepreneur, women in tech advocate, and the co-founder of Developers in Vogue. In January 2022, GhanaWeb featured Barley as one of the 3 Ghanaian ‘Women in Tech’ making strides on the international corporate scene. In 2017 and 2019, Barley was listed as one of the Top 50 Most Influential Young Ghanaians by Avance Media.

== Early life and education ==
Barley was born in Accra, Ghana, where she spent most of her childhood. She had her secondary education at Aburi Girls Senior High School, after which she pursued a bachelor's degree in Actuarial Science and a master's degree (MPhil.) in Mathematical Statistics at the Kwame Nkrumah University of Science and Technology.

== Social entrepreneur ==
Barley is the co-founder of Developers in Vogue, an organization that provides training, mentorship, and job placement for African women in tech. The impact of Developers in Vogue has been recognized at the IFC Sustainability Exchange: Invest for Tomorrow, the Women20 Summit in Berlin, Germany that had Chancellor Angela Merkel in attendance and the ITU International Girls in ICT Day.

Ivy's impact at Developers in Vogue has also been featured in various media platforms and books including the Women in Tech book by the German Federal Ministry of Economic Cooperation and Development to encourage more women and girls to be involved in STEM and the Founding Women book to highlight African women who are defying the odds to build successful businesses in tech.

== Awards and recognition ==
Year	Award	Reference
2021	Tech Entrepreneur Award Winner - Africa Women Innovation and Entrepreneurship Forum (AWIEF) Award	
2020	She For Social Impact Awards	
2019	Most Influential Young Ghanaian in Science and Technology	
2019	Top 50 Most Influential Young Ghanaians	
2019	F-LANE Finalist by the Vodafone Institute of Society and Communications	
2017	Kwese GoGettaz Competition Finalist	
2017	Winner, eSkills4Girls competition in Berlin, Germany	
