= Akosua Adomako Ampofo =

Ghanaian academic

Akosua Adomako Ampofo FGA
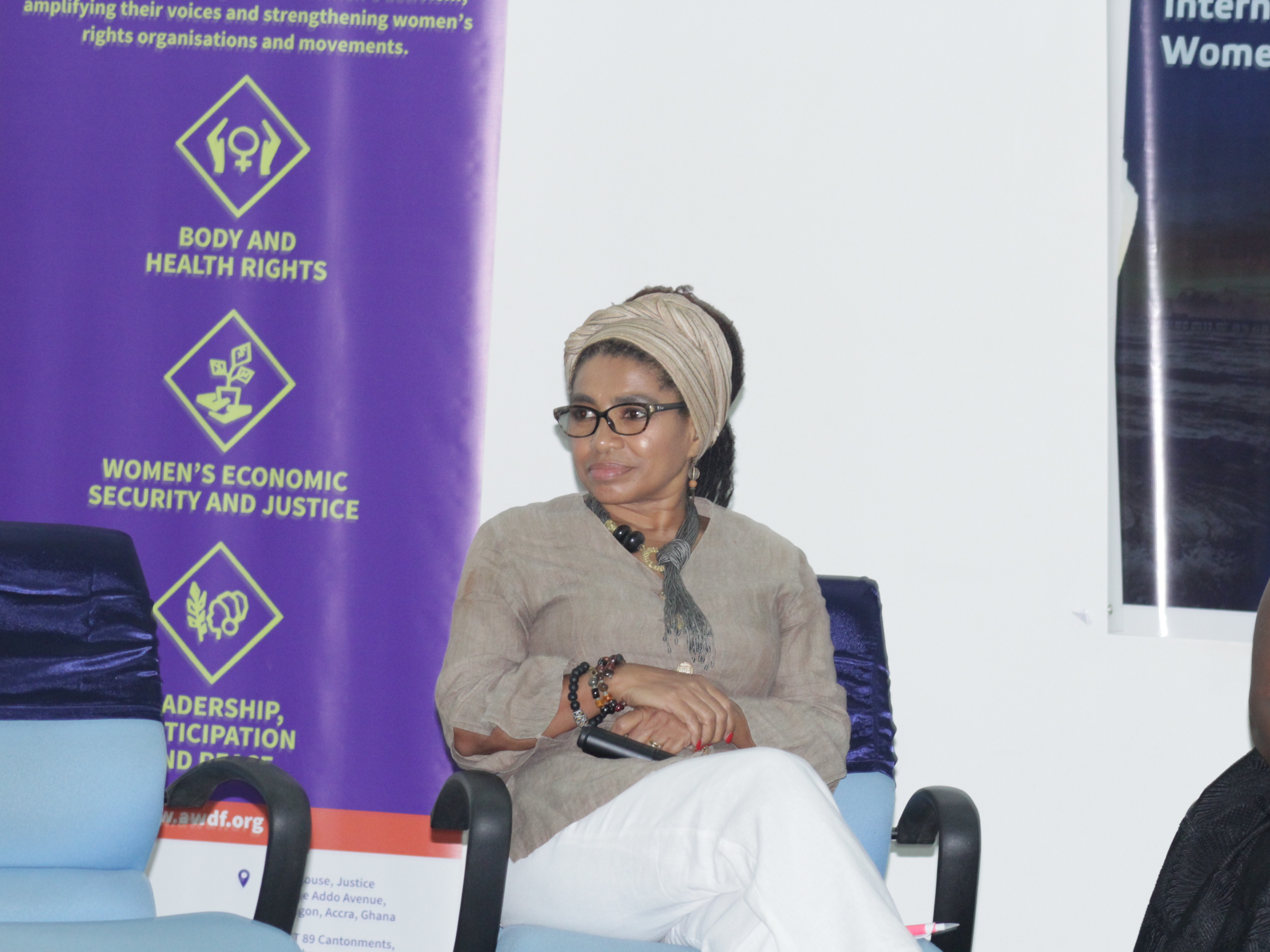
- Prof. Akosua Adomako Ampofo at a women's development summit in Accra

Personal details
- Education: Kwame Nkrumah University of Science and Technology; Technical University of Dortmund; Vanderbilt University
- Occupation: Academic; Development Planner; Sociologist
- Profession: Professor

Josephine Akosua Adomako Ampofo is a Ghanaian academic who is a professor of Gender Studies and African Studies at the University of Ghana. She is feminist activist-scholar, and a strong advocate for social justice.

== Early life and education ==
Ampofo's mother is German and her father is Ghanaian and Asante. Her father's family come from the Convention Peoples Party (CPP) tradition. Ampofo attended Aburi Girls' Secondary School. Ampofo earned her bachelor's degree at the Kwame Nkrumah University of Science and Technology, where she studied architectural design. She earned her master's degree at the same university in development planning and management. Ampofo earned her PhD in sociology from Vanderbilt University. Additionally, she holds a Post-Graduate Diploma in Spatial Planning from the Technical University of Dortmund, Germany.

== Academic career ==
Ampofo started teaching at the University of Ghana (UG) in 1989. During 1994 and 1995, Ampofo was a Junior Fulbright Scholar. In 2005, became the first Head of the Centre for Gender Studies and Advocacy (CEGENSA) at UG, which she held until 2009. Around 2008, she became an editor for Ghana Studies, working on that journal until 2013. She has also been the editor of the Contemporary Journal of African Studies.

She was a Mellon Fellow in 2014 at the University of Cape Town, where she worked in the Centre for African Studies. In 2015, she worked as a Senior Fulbright Scholar-in-Residence at Concordia University Irvine.

She has in the past consulted for organisations such as UNIFEM, UNICEF, World Health Organization (WHO), Save the Children, UNAIDS, Ministry for Gender & Social Protection, Ghana; Participatory Development Associates; Gender Studies and Human Rights Documentation Centre and Kofi Annan International Peacekeeping Training Centre.

== Professional association ==
In 2019, as president of the African Studies Association of Africa (ASAA), she presided over the first conference held in East Africa. Ampofo was a founding member of the ASAA which formed in 2013. She is also a member of the Association and Sociologists for Women and Society, (SWS), African Studies Association, United States, Ghana Domestic Violence Coalition, the Network for Women's Rights in Ghana, the Council for Social Science Research in Africa (CODESRIA) and International Sociological Association, (ISA). She is also a fellow of the Ghana Academy of Arts and Sciences.
