= Akosua Addai Amoo =

Ghanaian television presenter

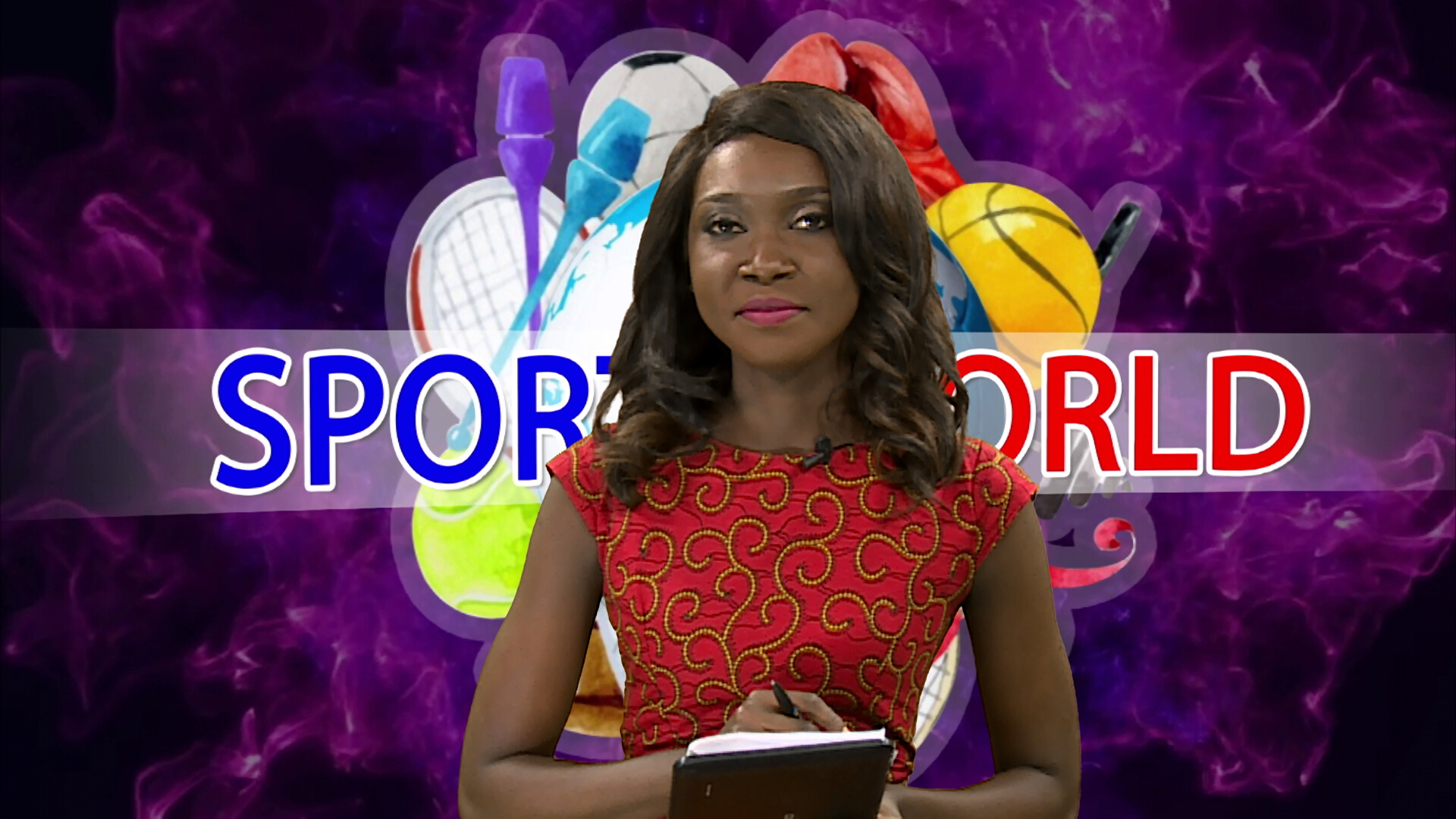
- Akosua at Metro TV studio
- Born: 4 December 1990 (age 35); Kumasi, Ghana
- Education: Wesley Girls' Senior High School; University of Ghana
- Occupations: Sports Journalist, TV Presenter
- Years active: 2010-present

Akosua Addai Amoo (born 4 December 1990) is a Ghanaian sports presenter, reporter and producer, formerly worked at Metro TV Ghana. Akosua Addai Amoo was also the host of a sport show on Metro TV's Sports World. She is currently a freelance sports journalist.

== Early life and education ==
Akosua was born on the 4 December 1990 in Accra the capital of Ghana. She attended Kiddy Gram Montessori and for primary and junior secondary school Alsyd Academy. After her Basic Education Certificate Examination exam she gained admission to Wesley Girls’ Senior High School. Akosua has a Bachelor of Arts degree in political science from the University of Ghana.

== Career ==
=== 2010–2017, Metro TV ===
Akosua's career as a sports broadcaster started when she was 19 years old in 2010 before gaining admission to University of Ghana. She interned at Metro TV and was production assistant for the TV's 2010 FIFA World Cup coverage. Akosua had her first appearance on television as a pundit for the FIFA U-20 Women's World Cup in July.

On completing University of Ghana in 2014, Akosua worked at Metro TV for a year as a national service personnel in the Sports department. Her roles at work entailed presenting the sports News on a daily basis, producing sports shows and covering Women's football in Ghana. After her service Akosua was employed by Metro TV. She hosted Metro TV's Sports World a show that recaps the daily sports stories and highlights the stories of Women in Sports. In 2017 Amoo resigned from the Labone-based station.

=== 2017– Freelance ===
Akosua has worked to develop women's football in Ghana and does a weekly feature to cover the poorly publicized women's league there. She is a sports writer with articles published in various online outlets including international football outlet Goal.com.

In 2019, she was one of the seven journalists selected by the International Sports Press Association (AIPS), to be trained and cover the 2019 African Games in Rabat.

Currently, Akosua is a Ghanaian Lawyer leading public relations for a non-governmental organisation in Ghana.

== See also ==
- Football in Ghana
