= Rose Constance Owusu =

Justice of Supreme Court of Ghana

Justice Rose Constance Owusu

Justice of the Supreme Court of Ghana
- In office 2008–2014
- Appointed by: John Kufour

Justice of the Appeal Court of Ghana
- In office 1999–2008
- Nominated by: Jerry Rawlings

Justice of the High Court of Ghana
- In office 1989–1999
- Nominated by: Jerry Rawlings

Personal details
- Born: August 24, 1944 (age 81) Ghana
- Education: Wesley Girls' High School; Aburi Girls' Senior High School
- Alma mater: University of Ghana; Ghana School of Law

Rose Constance Owusu is a Ghanaian former Justice of the Supreme Court of Ghana. She served on the Supreme Court bench from 2008 to 2014.

== Early life and education ==
Owusu was born on 24 August 1944 at Koforidua. Between 1958 and 1964, she attended Wesley Girls' High School and Aburi Girls Senior High School. She had her legal training at the University of Ghana, where she earned her LLB, and at the Ghana School of Law, where she had her Qualifying Certificate. She was called to the bar in 1969.

== Career ==
Owusu was appointed as a State Attorney in the Attorney-General's Department in March 1973. After working in that capacity for three years, she was promoted to the rank of Senior State Attorney, Second- in-Command in 1976 and later elevated to the position of Principal State Attorney in 1983.

On 19 September 1989 she was appointed to the Bench as a justice of the High Court. After a decade of service to the High Court bench she was appointed an Appeals Court judge in 1999. She served in that capacity until 2008 when she was appointed as justice of the Supreme Court of Ghana. She retired in 2014.

== Personal life ==
Owusu is a Christian.

== See also ==
- List of judges of the Supreme Court of Ghana
- Supreme Court of Ghana
