= Akosua Adoma Perbi =

Ghanaian author and a history professor (born 1952)

Akosua Adoma Perbi née Nketiah (born 1952) is a Ghanaian author and a history professor at the University of Ghana.

Perbi is the author of A History of Indigenous Slavery in Ghana from the 15th to the 19th Century and has written over twenty refereed articles and book chapters. Perbi acts as Ghana's permanent representative on UNESCO's International Scientific and Technical Committee on the Slave Route Project. She is also a council member and the treasurer of the Historical Society of Ghana.

She has over 30 years teaching experience.

== Education ==
Akosua Perbi was born to the Ghanaian composer and ethnomusicologist, J. H. Kwabena Nketia. Perbi had her secondary education at the Achimota School in Ghana. She is an alumna of the University of Ghana where she had her Bachelor's degree, Masters and a PhD in history.

== Career ==
She began her teaching career in 1974, where she taught at the Aburi Girls' Senior High School as a national service personnel.

She also worked with the Ghana National Archives as Assistant Archivist for two years (1977–79) and an additional two years with the Institute of Adult Education as Resident Tutor (1979-1981).

In 1981, she began lecturing at the University of Ghana till date.

== Publications ==
- “Enslavement, Rebellion and Emancipation in Africa: The Ghanaian Experience”, in A.R. Highfield & G.F. Tyson (eds): Negotiating Enslavement- Perspectives on Slavery in the Danish West Indies, Antilles Press, St. Croix, 2009, ISBN 0-916611-10-8, pages 15–29.
- A History of Indigenous Slavery in Ghana from the 15th to the 19th Century., Sub-Saharan Publishers, Legon, 2004, ISBN 978-9988-550-32-5
