= Avril Lovelace-Johnson =

Ghanaian judge

Justice Avril Lovelace-Johnson

Justice of the Supreme Court of Ghana
- Incumbent
- Assumed office 17 December 2019
- Nominated by: Nana Akufo-Addo

Appeal Court Judge
- In office October 2012 – 17 December 2019
- Nominated by: John Mahama

High Court Judge
- In office June 2002 – October 2012
- Nominated by: John Kufuor

Personal details
- Born: April 30, 1961 (age 64) Ghana
- Education: Wesley Girls' High School; Aburi Girls' Senior High School
- Alma mater: University of Ghana; Ghana School of Law
- Occupation: Judge
- Profession: Lawyer; Judge

Avril Lovelace-Johnson is a Ghanaian judge. She was nominated for the position of a Supreme Court of Ghana judge in November 2019 and received parliamentary approval in December 2019. She was sworn in on 17 December 2019. She has been a judge since 1990 and was appointed to the Supreme Court in 2019.

== Early life and education ==
Lovelace-Johnson was born on 30 April 1961 in Accra, Ghana. She received her primary education at SNAPS Preparatory School before attending Wesley Girls' Senior High School from 1973 to 1978 for her GCE Ordinary-level. She then proceeded to Aburi Girls' Senior High School from 1978 to 1980 for her GCE Advanced-level.

Lovelace-Johnson went on to study law at the University of Ghana, Legon, starting in 1981. She later enrolled in the Ghana School of Law in 1985, where she was called to the Ghana Bar in 1987.

== Career ==
After completing her legal education, Lovelace-Johnson began her National Service at the Attorney General's Office in Koforidua in 1988. She then worked as an Assistant State Attorney in the Accra Office from 1989 to 1990. From 1990 to 1991, she was a District Magistrate at the Kibi and Tafo Magistrate Courts in the Eastern Region, before moving to the La and 28 February Road Magistrate Courts in Accra, where she worked from 1991 to 1994.

Lovelace-Johnson was promoted to the sitting Circuit Court at the 28th February Road Courts from 1994 to June 2002. In 2002, she was elevated to the High Court of Ghana, where she served at the Accra and Tema Division.

In October 2012, she was appointed a Justice of the Court of Appeal. From December 2005 to 2009, she was assigned as a Justice of the High Court of The Gambia on an assignment for the Commonwealth Secretariat, London, UK. During that period, she also worked as an additional Justice of the Court of Appeal as directed by the Chief Justice.

From October 2014 to October 2016, Justice Lovelace-Johnson served as the Director of the Public Complaints and Court Inspectorate Unit of the Judicial Service. She was also the Vice President of the Association of Magistrates and Judges of Ghana from 2000 to 2002 and held various positions with the Planned Parenthood Association of Ghana.

Lovelace-Johnson had been a justice of the Court of Appeal until her nomination as a Supreme Court Judge in November 2019. She was sworn into office on 17 December 2019.

== See also ==
- List of judges of the Supreme Court of Ghana
- Supreme Court of Ghana
