= Patience Akyianu =

Ghanaian banker

- Occupation: Banker

Patience Akyianu was a Ghanaian Banker. She was currently the Chief Executive Officer, Ghana at Hollard Insurance, and a former managing director of Barclays Bank Ghana (now Absa Bank Ltd).

== Education ==
Akyianu completed her secondary school education at Wesley Girls' Senior High School in Cape Coast, the capital of the Central Region (Ghana). She graduated from the University of Ghana Business school with first class honours in Business Administration (accounting option). She has an MBA (Finance option) from the same institution.

== Career ==
Akyianu started work at Standard chartered bank as a financial controller. She rose to the position of chief financial officer (CFO) in the South African office of the Standard chartered bank, Africa regional operations.

== Awards and nominations ==
Akyianu was named finance CEO of the year at the third Ghana CFO awards in 2017.

She was nominated among the 60 women rising in Africa in 2017. Patience Akyianu was also nominated at the 2018 GECE Awards.

She was awarded the Nobles International Award (2013), Africa Female Economic Champion-Banking (Centre for Economic & Leadership Development (CELD)-2014), and was inducted into Global Women Leaders Hall of Fame (CELD- 2014) and Woman of Excellence in Finance (Ghana CFO Awards 2015). She was a nominee in the Top 50 Rising Stars in Africa (The Africa Report, May 2014).

In 2021 she was African Female Business Leader of the Year.
