= Sylvia Boye =

Ghanaian chief executive

- Education: University of Ghana
- Known for: Registrar of West African Examinations Council

Sylvia Boye is a Ghanaian woman, former Chief Executive and first female Registrar of the West African Examination Council.

== Education ==
Boye attended Wesley Girls' Senior High School in Cape Coast. Boye earned a Bachelor of Arts and LLD from the University of Ghana.
