= Jennifer Koranteng =

Ghanaian businesswomen and model (born 1986)

- Born: Jennifer Koranteng; 1986 (age 39–40); Accra, Ghana
- Education: University of Ghana
- Height: 1.79 m (5 ft 10 1/2 in)
- Beauty pageant titleholder
- Title: Miss Universe Ghana 2009
- Hair color: Black
- Eye color: Black
- Major competitions: Miss Universe Ghana (Winner); Miss Ghana 2006 (2nd Runner-up)

Jennifer Koranteng (born 27 July 1986) is a Ghanaian businesswoman, model and beauty pageant titleholder. She was first runner up at Miss Ghana 2006, went on to become Miss Universe Ghana in 2009 and represented her country at the Miss Universe pageant later that same year in Bahamas.

She is also the founder and creative lead of African fashion brand JVK Clothing.

== Early life ==
Koranteng was born on 27 July 1986 in Accra, Ghana. She grew up in Axim until age 5 when she moved to Takoradi with her family where she lived for another 2 years before moving to Accra. She enrolled at the Morning Star school where she completed her primary and Junior High School education before moving on to the prestigious Wesley Girls' High School for her secondary education. Upon graduating from Wesley Girls’ she gained admission into the University of Ghana in Legon where she graduated with a degree in Psychology and Theatre Arts.

== Pageants ==
In her first year at the university, Koranteng participated in the Miss Ghana beauty pageant in 2006 and emerged first runner up. Not entirely satisfied with the outcome of her first pageant, she entered the Miss Universe pageant three years later in 2009 in which she was crowned winner and represented Ghana at the world finals in Bahamas. At the Miss Universe finals in 2009, she was on the leaderboard for top 25 out of 83 beauty queens from around the world.

== Career ==
Koranteng interned for Finatrade Group during her summer breaks in University. She also modeled under the Exopa Agency during that time where she did several shows including Accra Fashion Week. She joined United Bank for Africa as a marketing executive for two years before moving to New York to pursue a modeling career full-time.

After her time modeling and exposure to the fashion industry, she founded JVK Clothing which is a retailer of trendy African fashion for women.

== Social work ==
Koranteng, as part of her social work for Miss Universe, embarked on an effort to encourage reading among children. This work involved raising funds from corporate and other organizations that went towards equipping basic school libraries. The first donation for the project was to the Anglican Primary School in Axim, where she donated reading books, exercise books and other stationery to the school library. Similar donations were made to schools in Jamestown, which is one of the lower income suburbs in Accra. She also made donations to her alma mater, the Morning Star school in Accra.
