= Abena Brigidi =

Ghanaian financial analyst

Abena B. Brigidi is a Ghanaian investment analyst author and speaker. She is a financial analyst and a banker with over a decade in the financial industry.

She is the founding partner and the chief executive officer of Nimed Capital Limited, a leading investment banking firm in Accra, Ghana.

== Early life ==
Brigidi attended Achimota School and Aburi Girls Senior High School. She holds a bachelor's degree in Humanities from the University of Ghana and as well as Masters of Business Administration (MBA) in General Management from the University of East London. She worships with the Restoration Center of the Assemblies of God Church Roman Ridge.

== Career ==
Brigidi worked at Halifax PLC, a bank operating in the United Kingdom as a trading division of the Bank of Scotland. She joined Zenith Bank Ghana as a customer service advisor and then as a relationship manager and head of customer service in Ghana Branch. She left Zenith Bank and joined All-Time Capital, an investing banking firm in Accra as vice president for sales and marketing with responsibility over marketing and new product development. After two years with All-Time Capital, she joined Kariela Oil and Gas Ghana between January 2010 and August 2014, where she spent four years in the position of chief financial officer.

Brigidi was a founding partner and the chief executive officer at Nimed Capital Limited, a leading investment banking firm.

== Personal life ==
Abena is married to a legal practitioner, David Cobbina Brigidi, and the couple have twin children.
