= Akwapim South (Ghana parliament constituency) =

Constituency in the Eastern Region of Ghana

Akuapim South
- constituency for the Parliament of Ghana
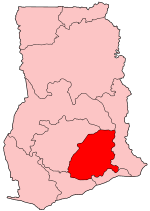
- District: Akuapim South Municipal District
- Region: Eastern Region of Ghana

Current constituency
- Party: National Democratic Congress (Ghana)
- MP: Lawrencia Dziwornu

Akuapim South is one of the constituencies represented in the Parliament of Ghana. It elects one Member of Parliament (MP) by the first past the post system of election. Akuapim South used to be known as the Aburi-Nsawam constituency until it was divided in 2012 which gave us Akuapim South and Nsawam Adoagyiri constituencies.

== Boundaries ==
The seat is located entirely within the Akuapem South Municipal Assembly of the Eastern Region of Ghana.

== Members of Parliament ==
Election	Member	Party
1992	Vida Yeboah	National Democratic Congress (Ghana)
1996	Vida Yeboah	National Democratic Congress (Ghana)
2012	Osei Bonsu Amoah	New Patriotic Party
2016	Osei Bonsu Amoah	New Patriotic Party
2020	Osei Bonsu Amoah	New Patriotic Party
2024	Lawrencia Dziwornu	National Democratic Congress (Ghana)

== See also ==
- List of Ghana Parliament constituencies
- Akuapim South Municipal District
