= Mercy Yvonne Debrah-Karikari =

Ghanaian diplomat

Mercy Yvonne Debrah-Karikari is a Ghanaian diplomat and the first female to be secretary to the cabinet of the government of Ghana. She was appointed to occupy this position by the current president Nana Akufo-Addo. Her appointment took effect on 14 February 2017.

== Education ==
Debrah-Karikari attended Wesley Girls Senior High School in Cape Coast from 1971 to 1976, and later continued at the Tema Secondary School in Tema from 1976 to 1978. She obtained a degree in arts and a diploma in education from the University of Cape Coast from 1979 to 1986. She then earned a master's degree in international affairs from the University of Ghana from 1988 to 1989.

== Career ==
Debrah-Karikari served as the head of chancery at the Ghana Embassy in Luanda, Angola from 1994 to 1995. She was then posted to the United Nation, Ghana Permanent Mission in New York where she served as Consular, and Ghana's delegate on the Second Committee of the United Nations . Having returned from her mission in 1988, Mercy occupied the position, acting director of the International Organizations and Conferences Bureau at the Ministry of Foreign Affairs. From 2000 to 2002, Mercy served as minister-consular at the Ghana Embassy in Bonn and continued at the Ghana Embassy in Berlin from 2002 to 2004. She then proceeded to serve as the director of the office of the minister of foreign affairs from 2004 to 2007. In 2007 she was posted to work at the Ghana Permanent Mission to the United Nations Office in Geneva as minister and deputy permanent representative until 2011. In July 2014 she was appointed high commissioner by former president John Mahama. Before her appointment as secretary to cabinet in 2017, she served as Ghana's high commissioner to Australia in the John Mahama administration.

== Personal life ==
Debrah-Karikari is divorced. Her interests include sports, gospel music, movies and charity work.
