= Rosamond Asiamah Nkansah =

Ghanaian police officer (1930–2021)

Rosamond Asiamah Nkansah (13 January 1930 – 20 February 2021) was a Ghanaian law enforcement officer who was the first woman to be enlisted into the Ghana Police Service, then the Gold Coast Police Force.

== Education ==
She attended Wesley Girls High School in Cape Coast. She held a Senior Cambridge and Teacher's Certificate 'A'.

== Life and career ==
She was enlisted into the Gold Coast Police Force on 1 September 1952 at the age of 22. She was enlisted first together with 11 other women and made their leader. This was a time policewoman were not allowed to marry or get pregnant; contrary to this directive, they were compelled to resign. Before her resignation, she petitioned the government to allow policewomen to marry and have children, and also to reinstate those who resigned for the purpose of raising families. The petition was accepted and the condition that prevented women from serving long on the force, due to marriage and pregnancy was abolished.

She resigned on 16 May 1958. After her resignation, she taught at St. John's Grammar School from 1961 to 1964 as a professional teacher because of the certification she had before being enlisted in the Gold Coast Police Force. She joined the Ghana Broadcasting Corporation in 1965 and headed the School broadcasting programs for a year.

She retired from active service in 1999 to primarily focus on writing books. She also translated words in her book (Octagon) into foreign and local languages.

== Death ==
Asiamah died at the Police Hospital in Accra on Saturday evening, February 20, 2021.
