= Angela Kyerematen-Jimoh =

Ghanaian business person

- Education: Wesley Girls' High School; Achimota School; Harvard Business School
- Occupation: Business leader
- Known for: First woman to become country director of IBM in Africa

Angela Kyerematen-Jimoh is a Ghanaian business leader and the founder and CEO of Brainwave Tech Africa, a technology company focused on innovative solutions for the African continent. She was previously Microsoft’s Strategic Partnership Lead for Africa.

Prior to founding Brainwave Tech Africa and Microsoft, she served as the executive director/regional head for IBM North, East, and West Africa from 2019 to 2021. She is the former country general manager for Ghana. She is the first woman to become country director of IBM in Africa and the first African woman to be appointed regional general manager.

== Education ==
Kyerematen-Jimoh holds a BA in Marketing and French. She is an alumna of Harvard Business School and London Guildhall College. She is also an old student of Wesley Girls' High School and Achimota School in Ghana.

== Career ==
Kyerematen-Jimoh has 20 years of extensive working experience in the financial services and technology industries in Africa and Europe. In 2011, she joined IBM as the territory marketing manager responsible for IBM West Africa. She later moved to Nairobi, Kenya as strategy leader for IBM's Central, East and West Africa operations.

Kyerematen-Jimoh served as a member of the governing board of the Bank of Ghana from 2021 to 2025, chaired by Dr. Ernest Addison. The board is responsible for the formulation of policies for the achievement of the central bank's objectives.

In 2025, Kyerematen-Jimoh joined the Institute of Directors UK as a member and was also sworn in as a member of the governing board of National Information Technology Agency, Ghana.

Before joining IBM, she worked in the UK for UBS Investment Bank and ABN AMRO Bank.

In January 2022, Microsoft announced the appointment of Kyerematen-Jimoh as the new Africa Strategic Partnerships Manager in its new Africa Transformation Office (ATO). The office focuses on facilitating growth and investment in four key development areas: digital infrastructure, skills development, small and medium enterprises (SMEs) and startups.

Angela has spent the past decade serving as a board member of various institutions, including the Bank of Ghana, Unilever Ghana, Global Legal Entity Identifier Foundation, Allianz Life Ghana Limited, Student Loan Trust Fund Ghana, Bayport Financial Services and the American Chamber of Commerce, Ghana.

== Awards ==
WomanRising ranked her among the Top 50 Corporate Women Leaders in Ghana for 2016. In 2018, she was awarded the Corporate Personality of the Year by Glitz Africa. In 2023, she was named by Forbes Afrique among the Top 50 Women Managers in Africa. In 2020, Kyerematen-Jimoh was named among Africa’s 2020 Top 100 Most Influential Women by Avance Media.
