= African Achievers Awards =

Annual African award ceremony

The African Achievers Awards is an annual awards event. Awards are given in the categories of community development, leadership, arts & culture, business & entrepreneurship, agriculture, community service, rural development and education.

== History ==
The awards organisation, Achievers Media, was founded by lawyer Tonye Rex Idaminabo. The first award was presented to the Archbishop Desmond Tutu in 2011 in recognition of his fight for human rights, justice and peace.

The first awards event was held at King's College London in February 2012. Nominations for the awards were accepted online. Several categories of awards are presented at the event. Two Awards for Excellence in Leadership were presented, the first to the President of Malawi Joyce Banda and the second to the deputy Governor of Lagos State, Orelope Akinfilure, for outstanding leadership of the economy of Lagos State. The African Achievers Awards for women empowerment was presented to the former Deputy Prime Minister of Zimbabwe, Thokozani Khuphe, for her works and service to women and children in Zimbabwe.

Awards were also presented to organisations, including the Charity of the Year award to Edinburgh charity organization, Children of Songea Trust, which supplies school meals, education facilities and school clothing to the Songea community in Tanzania. Wale Akinlabi, producer of Good Morning Africa (Channel 114, MNet DSTV) was awarded with the best African Content TV Programme.

The 2012 event was covered by BEN TV Sky, Afro Gossip and African Event Pictures.

The 2013 awards ceremony was held in Nairobi.

The 2015 awards ceremony was held in Johannesburg, South Africa.

The 2016 awards event was held in July 2016 in Abuja at the International Conference Centre. Awards were presented in 30 categories.

The 2017 awards event was held at the Houses of Parliament in London on 30 November 2017.

The 2018 awards event was again held at the London Houses of Parliament, on 5 July 2018. Award-winners included Jewel Taylor, Mo Abudu, Bogolo Kenewendo, Angela Kyerematen-Jimoh and Ibrahim Mahama.

The 2019 awards event again held at the London Houses of Parliament, on 11 July 2019. Award-winners included Simbirie Jalloh.

The 2023 awards edition was held at the Houses of Parliament in London
