= Thomas Svanikier =

Ghanaian entrepreneur

- Born: 1960 (age 65–66); Ghana
- Occupations: Entrepreneur, philanthropist
- Known for: Founder and executive chairman of Svani Group
- Spouse: Johanna Odonkor Svanikier
- Children: 3

Thomas Swaniker (born January 1960) is a leading Ghanaian entrepreneur and philanthropist. He is the founder and executive chairman of Svani Group, an automotive conglomerate, as well as a founder and chairman of the advisory board of Fidelity Bank, an international financial institution.

Svanikier has been at the forefront of Ghana's economic modernization over the past 25 years, most notably in the automobile and financial sectors.

== Career ==
Thomas Svanikier's first venture was an automotive import business. Svani Limited, established in 1990, supplied Russian-made Lada cars to Ghanaian industry, NGOs and government agencies, and consumers throughout West Africa. In response to the notable absence of North American automobiles, Svani Limited reintroduced Ford and Lincoln Mercury cars to the Ghanaian market in 1994.

Svanikier quickly expanded his company and renamed it Svani Group. The company imports vehicles, leases, rents and sells cars, and is a distributor of generators and other heavy-duty equipment throughout West Africa. Svani has sold armored vehicles to the Office of the President of Ghana, the U.S. Secret Service in Nigeria, the Governor of Lagos State, and the governments of Liberia and Togo. The group also provides automotive maintenance and specialized equipment to the U.S. Department of State in Ghana.

By 2013, Svani controlled about 20% of the vehicles market in Ghana and had service centers in Accra, Takoradi, Koforidua and Kumasi. Svani is also the sole importer and distributor of Mahindra vehicles, as well as the largest distributor of Toyota Land Cruisers and Ford vehicles in Ghana. In partnership with Svanikier's company, Mahindra built a motorcycle and pickup truck assembly plant in Accra, Ghana. The two companies worked on the development of a 9.6 acre car assembly and servicing center along the Accra-Tema motorway.

A number of Svani-distributed vehicles have received nominations in Ghana's Auto Awards.

Svanikier ventured into private equity with the creation of Africa Capital LLC, which invests in transportation, energy, finance, and real estate projects.

In 2010, Africa Capital's energy subsidiary, Atholl Energy, was lauded by then President John Evans Atta Mills for its joint project with the Siemens group to construct a 180-megawatt power generation plant that greatly augmented Ghana's power supply.

Africa Capital is the largest shareholder of Fidelity Bank. Fidelity is currently the fourth largest bank in Ghana, and is growing rapidly. Fidelity Bank has 98 branches in Ghana and plans to increase that number significantly in the coming years. In July 2020, the bank's total assets stood at GHC 10.2 billion.

In July 2015, Svanikier and his wife were invited to be part of U.S. President Barack Obama's delegation during his official visit to Kenya. Svanikier was also asked to take part in the Global Entrepreneurship Summit organized in Nairobi, Kenya by the U.S. Department of Commerce, at which the president met with leading figures in African business circles.

As of 2015, Svanikier serves as the senior adviser for Africa for the Transnational Strategy Group, a Washington, D.C.–based company that provides consultancy services for governments and companies on economic and political issues.

== Philanthropy ==
It is really gratifying to see organizations like Svani step up and join the fight against Ebola.The response needs equipment, logistical support, technology and innovation and this partnership is going to boost the UN's efforts to end this horrible disease.

— Dominic Sam
UNDP Country Director in Accra

Svanikier is a well-known philanthropist in Ghana.

He serves as a leader for the Opportunities Industrialisation Centre (also known as OIC International). OIC is a non-profit group in Pennsylvania that gives technical and vocational skills training to underprivileged adults and teenagers.

He is also a leader of the Africa Poverty Eradication Commission located in Accra.

Svanikier is known as a generous supporter of education and youth development programs, and has donated a 35-seat bus worth $64,000 to Ghana's renowned Winneba Youth Choir.

He is also an ongoing benefactor of the Presbyterian Schools in the Accra neighborhood of Osu. He funded the installation of its clean water and sanitation systems, as well as the construction of its Primary School for girls and a modern library with a computer laboratory. The Girls' School facilities are dedicated to the memory of his late mother, Agnes Federica Svanikier.

In December, 2014, in the midst of the Ebola outbreak in West Africa, Svani Group partnered with the United Nations Development Programme (UNDP) in the fight against the Ebola epidemic. Svani Group donated eight heavy-duty vehicles as well as several power generators to the United Nations' Ebola Emergency Response.

In 2015, Svanikier and his wife founded the Svanikier Public Policy Leadership Initiative, which donated $100,000 to the University of Oxford's School of Government. The funds went towards sponsorship for six Ghanaian public officials to attend courses at the university focused on Governance and Natural Resource management.

== Personal ==
Svanikier is married and has a son and two daughters. His wife, Johanna Odonkor Svanikier, was a Fulbright Scholar who studied at University of Oxford and Harvard University. Johanna Odonkor-Svanikier was Ghana's Ambassador to France, Portugal and UNESCO.
