= Salma Mancell-Egala =

Ghanaian diplomat

Amb. Salma Frances Mancell-Egala

Ambassador to Turkey
- Incumbent
- Assumed office July 2017
- President: Nana Akuffo-Addo

Personal details
- Born: Ghana
- Party: New Patriotic Party

Salma Frances Mancell-Egala is a Ghanaian diplomat. She was previously Ghana's ambassador to Turkey.

== Ambassadorial appointment ==
In July 2017, President Nana Akuffo-Addo named Salma Mancell-Egala as Ghana's ambassador to Turkey. She was among twenty two other distinguished Ghanaians who were named to head various diplomatic Ghanaian mission in the world.
