= Yvonne Tsikata =

Ghanaian economist

Vice President and Corporate Secretary of the World Bank Group.
- Incumbent
- Assumed office January 2016

Personal details
- Born: Ghana
- Education: Bryn Mawr College, PhD New York University

Yvonne Tsikata is a Ghanaian economist and currently serves as the World Bank Vice President and Corporate Secretary. She previously served as the Chief of Staff and Director of the Office President of the World Bank Group. Yvonne was also the sector director for Poverty Reduction and Economic Management Department of the Europe and Central Asia Region.

== Early life and education ==
Tsikata had her secondary education at the Wesley Girls' High School. She holds an undergraduate degree from Bryn Mawr College in Pennsylvania. She earned her graduate degree in Economics from New York University.

== Career ==
Yvonne started her career as a teacher of monetary theory and macroeconomic theory at New York University. She worked for the Organisation for Economic Co-operation and Development (OECD) in Paris and at the United Nations University's World Institute for Development Economics Research in Helsinki.

Yvonne joined the World Bank Group in 1991. Before joining the World Bank President's office in September 2013, Tsikata was Director of Economic Policy in the Europe and Central Asia region. She served as Country Director for the Caribbean in the Latin America region. She visited Haiti on behalf of the World Bank after the earthquake.

In 1998 and 2001, while on leave from the World Bank Group, she served as a senior research fellow at the Economic and Social Research Foundation in Dar es Salaam, Tanzania; as a consultant to the Organisation for Economic Co-operation and Development in Paris; and to the United Nations University's World Institute for Development Economics Research in Helsinki.
