= Osei Bonsu Amoah =

Ghanaian politician

Hon Osei Bonsu Amoah MP
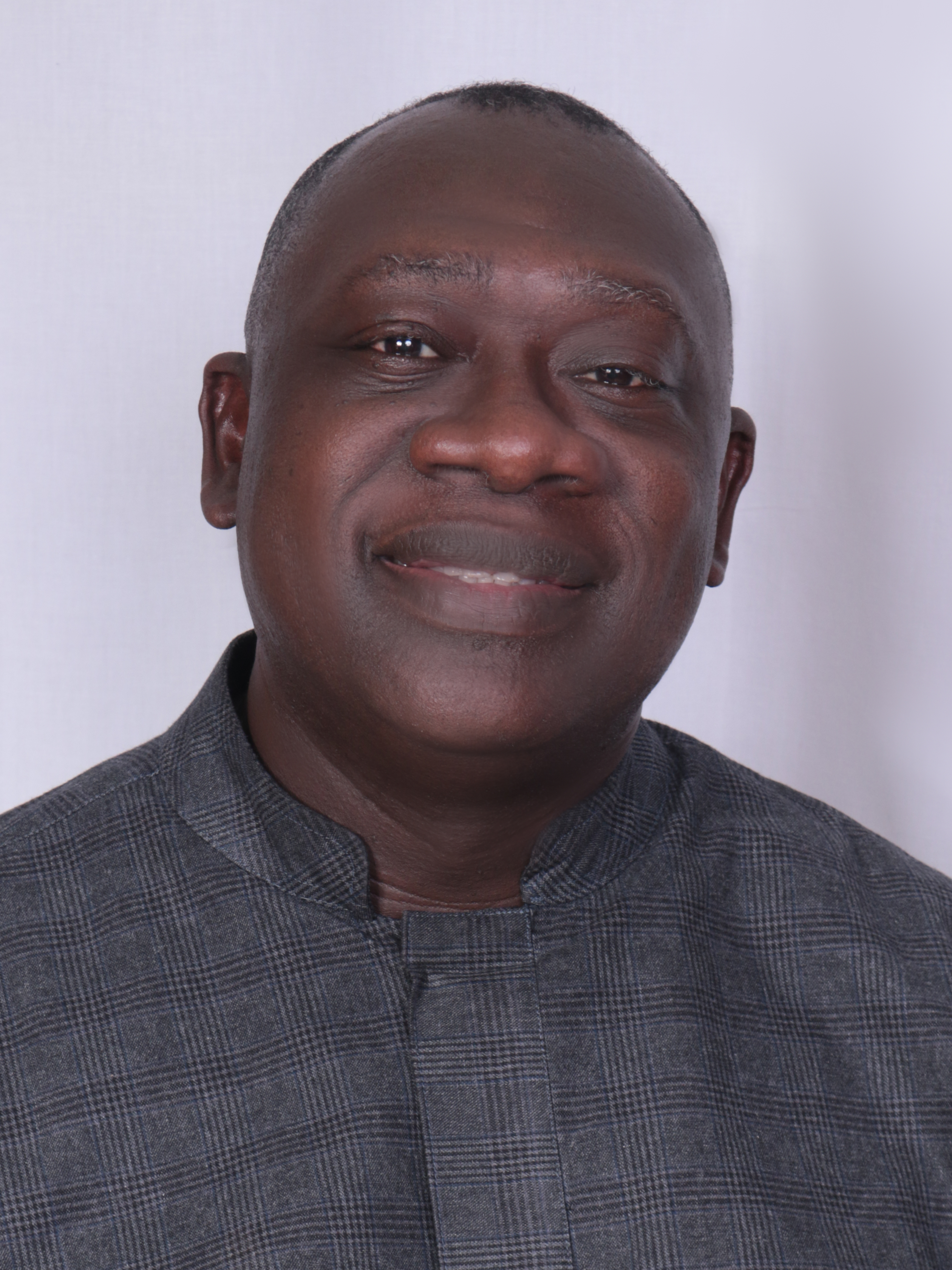

MP for Akwapim South Constituency
- Incumbent
- Assumed office 2013
- President: Nana Addo Dankwa Akufo-Addo

Personal details
- Born: 15 August 1961 (age 65) Aburi, Ghana
- Party: New Patriotic Party
- Education: Prempeh College, University of Ghana, Ghana School of Law
- Occupation: Inspector of Taxes
- Profession: Politician
- Committees: Standing Orders Committee; Subsidiary Legislation Committee; Appointments Committee

Osei Bonsu Amoah (born August 15, 1961) is a Ghanaian politician and member of the Seventh Parliament of the Fourth Republic of Ghana and represents the people of Akwapim South Constituency in the Eastern Region of Ghana under the flag of the New Patriotic Party.

== Early life and education ==
Amoah was born on August 15, 1961. He hails from Aburi, a town in the Eastern Region of Ghana. He spent his secondary school years in the prestigious Prempeh College and he earned his Bachelor of Science degree in law from University of Ghana in 1985. At Ghana School of Law he obtained a Bachelor of Law degree in 1995.

== Political career ==
He is a member of the New Patriotic Party. He is currently the Member of Parliament for the Akwapim South Constituency.

=== 2012 election ===
In the 2012 Ghanaian general election, he won the Akwapim South Constituency parliamentary seat with 12,720 votes making 49.73% of the total votes cast whilst the NDC parliamentary candidate William Ntow Boahene had 8,694 votes making 33.99% of the total votes cast the CPP parliamentary candidate Isaac Opare Addo had 3,713 votes making 14.52% of the total votes cast and the PPP parliamentary candidate Micheal Asante had 450 votes making 1.76% of the total votes cast.

=== 2016 election ===
In the 2016 Ghanaian general election, he again won the Akwapim South Constituency parliamentary seat with 14,049 votes making 52.8% of the total votes cast whilst the NDC parliamentary candidate Lawrencia Dziwornu had 8,417 votes making 31.6% of the total votes cast and the CPP parliamentary candidate Isaac Opare Addo had 4,153 votes making 15.6% of the total votes cast.

=== 2020 election ===
In the 2020 Ghanaian general election, he again won the Akwapim South Constituency parliamentary seat with 21,247 votes making 65.41% of the total votes cast whilst the NDC parliamentary candidate Winston Kwadwo Afari-Djan had 11,237 votes making 34.59% of the total votes cast.

=== Committees ===
In 2016, he was the Chairman of the Subsidiary Legislative Committee of Parliament of Ghana.

He is a member of the Standing Orders Committee, a member of the Subsidiary Legislation Committee and also a member of the Appointments Committee.

=== Ministerial position ===
He is currently the Deputy Minister for Local Government, Decentralization and Rural Development.

== Employment ==
Prior to his appointment into parliament, Amoah worked as the Inspector of Taxes, IRS between 1988 and 1996. He was appointed as the Special Assistance, Office of the President, and served from 2001 to 2005.

He was immediately appointed as Deputy Minister at the Ministry of Education Youth and Sport, and served from 2005 to 2008.

== Personal life ==
He identifies as a Christian, and he is married to a fellow big time lawyer with three children.
