= Aburi Girls' Senior High School =

All female school in Aburi, Ghana

- Aburi Girls
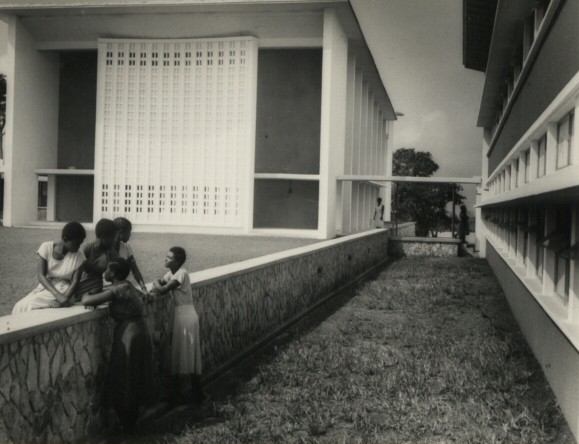
- Aburi Girls' Senior High School

Location
- Eastern Region; Ghana; 5.837004°N 0.179058°W

Information
- School type: Single sex Faith-based high school
- Religious affiliation: Presbyterian Church of Ghana
- Founded: 1946; 80 years ago
- Founder: Basel Missionaries
- Status: Active
- Sister school: Presbyterian Boys' Secondary School
- School district: Akuapim South Municipal District
- Oversight: Ghana Education Service
- Authorizer: Ministry of Education
- Headmistress: Wilhelmina Obuobisa-Atakora
- Form: 1-3
- Gender: Girls
- Education system: Senior high school
- Language: English
- Colors: Yellow and green
- Website: aburigirls.edu.gh

Aburi Girls' Senior High School, formerly Aburi Girls' Secondary School, also known as ABUGISS, is a Presbyterian senior high boarding school for girls located south of Aburi in the Eastern Region of Ghana.

The brother school of Aburi Girls is Presbyterian Boys' Secondary School, known as "PRESEC".

== History ==
Aburi Girls Senior High School was formally established as a secondary school for girls in 1946 with only seven students.

However, its origin dates as far back as 1852, when the Basel Missionaries opened a school at primary level for girls at their mission station inside the town. The primary school continued until its takeover by the Scottish Mission during the World War I. In the 1920s the training of teachers was begun alongside a kindergarten section and a middle school, also for girls, and in 1946, secondary classes were introduced side by side with the teacher-training course.

In 1950 the Presbyterian Church of the Gold Coast (now Ghana) took over the Management of the school when its partner missions the Basel Mission and the Scottish Mission left. The secondary school was physically separated from the teacher training classes and moved to its present site on the outskirts of Aburi in 1954. Classes ran from Form 1 to Form 5 until 1958, when a Sixth Form was added. Presently the 3-year Senior High School system is run.

In 1972, the Methodist Training College located on the southern side of the school was closing down so Joyce Asibey, the first Ghanaian Headmistress initiated negotiations with the Methodist Church to acquire the college premises for the school. The compound had a dining hall, dormitory and classrooms and so it was used to house form one students. This was done to reduce the incidence of bullying. Due to the increase in numbers in the 1990s, this arrangement was stopped and the old “Metico” building is now bonafide house known as Irene Anderson House just as the entire compound. The school is located on the easternmost part of the ridge forming the Akuapem Mountains, about a mile to the south of Aburi.

== Global Robotics Competition ==
A total of 12 students from the Aburi Girls Senior High School will be representing Ghana at the first ever Global Robotics Competition.

== Houses ==
The school currently has eight houses, named as follows:

- Aberdeen House
- Irene Anderson House
- Sylvia Asempa House
- Barradale House
- Chapel House
- Edinburgh House
- Kilsyth House
- Royal Park House

== Programmes offered ==
Below are academic programmes offered in the school:

- Business
- Visual Arts
- Home Economics
- General Science
- General Arts

== Achievements ==
Between 2011 and 2015, the school cleared the top awards in two categories in the West African Senior School Certificate Examination (WASSCE) winning Best in Mathematics and Science. Also in 2015, the school won the three top awards in the National Best School and Best Teacher Awards for the Senior High School Division for the Eastern Region.

== School code ==
0020301

== School category ==
Category A

== School Facilities ==
Below are the facilities provided for the school

- Home Economics Kitchen
- Science Lab
- Administration Block
- Dinning Hall
- Library

== Notable alumni ==
- Akosua Adomako Ampofo, Ghanaian academic, sociologist and professor of Gender studies and African studies at the University of Ghana.
- Senyuiedzorm Awusi Adadevoh, photojournalist
- Vida Akoto-Bamfo, justice of the Supreme Court of Ghana (2009 – 2019)
- Gloria Akuffo, Attorney General of Ghana and Minister of Justice (2017 – 2021)
- Sylvia Anie, chemist, Fellow of the Royal Society of Chemistry, received an award from the Old Students Association of Aburi Girls’ Senior High School recognizing her contributions to scientific knowledge.
- Francisca Ashietey-Odunton, journalist, broadcaster and diplomat
- Ivy Barley, Ghanaian entrepreneur
- Veronica Bekoe, Ghanaian Biological scientist, inventor of Veronica Bucket
- Abena Brigidi, investment analyst author and speaker
- Esi Awuah, Ghanaian academic;foundation vice chancellor of the University of Energy and Natural Resources, Ghana
- Matilda Baffour Awuah, Security expert, former Director General of the Ghana Prisons Service
- Christine Alexandra Clerk, physician and epidemiologist
- Nuong Faalong, Ghanaian journalist, activist, and actress
- Elsie Effah Kaufmann, current Host of the National Science and Math Quiz and biomedical engineering scholar
- Lovelace Johnson, active Justice of the Supreme Court of Ghana (2019–)
- Ofie Kodjoe, American-Ghanaian singer, actress, radio presenter and motivational speaker
- Cynthia Lamptey, Deputy Special Prosecutor (2018–)
- Lauretta Vivian Lamptey, Commissioner for Human Rights and Administrative Justice (2011 – 2015)
- Deloris Frimpong Manso, entrepreneur, television and radio show host, producer, public speaker and Women's Advocate
- Ernestina Naadu Mills, educator and former First Lady of Ghana
- Abena Oduro, Vice Dean of the Faculty of Social Science at the University of Ghana
- Frema Opare, Ghanaian politician; first female Chief of Staff of Ghana
- Rose Constance Owusu, justice of the Supreme Court of Ghana (2008 – 2014)
- Akosua Adoma Perbi, Ghanaian author and history professor
- Florence Oboshie Sai-Cofie, Minister for Information and National Orientation (2007 – 2008), Minister of Tourism and Diaspora Relations (2008 – 2009)
- Cina Soul, singer-songwriter and recording artist
- Johanna Odonkor Svanikier, diplomat
- Theresa Amerley Tagoe, Ghanaian politician
- Lawrencia Dziwornu, Ghanaian politician

== School Traditions ==
Senior students (Form 3s), are referred to as "Lady" by their juniors. The school does not have a canteen, that is, the dining hall is the only source of nourishment for students. However, there is a tuckshop where pastries, groceries and soft drinks are sold.
