= Johanna Odonkor Svanikier =

Ghanaian barrister and diplomat (born 1968)

Johanna Odonkor Svanikier is the founding President and CEO of the Heritage and Cultural Society of Africa. She is also a former Ambassador of Ghana to France and Portugal, as well as to the International Organisation of La Francophonie and the OECD Development Centre. She also served as Ghana's Permanent Delegate to the United Nations Educational, Scientific and Cultural Organization (UNESCO). She was called to the bar of England and Wales in 1990 and to the Ghana bar in 1991. She is a member of the Inner Temple. She has also worked as a university lecturer and a development consultant.

== Education ==
=== Secondary ===
Johanna Svanikier attended Aburi Girls Secondary/High School in Ghana.

=== University and postgraduate ===
Svanikier holds a bachelor's degree (LL.B.) and master's degree (LL.M.) from the London School of Economics. She earned a master's degree in public administration (M.P.A.) from Harvard University's Kennedy School of Government where she was a Fulbright scholar. She also holds a master’s in political science (M.Sc) from the University of Oxford.

== Career ==
On October 24, 2014, Ambassador Svanikier officially presented her “letters of credence” to French President François Hollande at the Elysée Palace in Paris, France. In his remarks, Hollande praised Ghana for earning prestige and respect in the international community.

Svanikier served as Commissioner on the National Development Planning Commission of Ghana between 2010 and 2014 and has been a non-executive director of Fidelity Bank, Ghana Ltd since 2009 where she chairs the Staff Welfare and Remuneration Committee. She is also on the Advisory Board of the Ministry of Lands and Natural Resources in Ghana.

In 2016 she founded the Heritage and Cultural Society of Africa which organised the Destination Ghana ,African Diaspora Homecoming Conference to celebrate the 60th Anniversary of Ghana's Independence and its significance for Africans in the Diaspora and peoples of African Origin. It was attended by notable personalities from both Africa and the Diaspora including Lord Paul Boateng of Akyem and Wembley, Lisa Mensah the former Under Secretary of State for Rural Development in the Obama administration, actor Hugh Quarshie of Star Wars and Holby City fame, Patrick Awuah founder of Ashesi University, Fred Swaniker founder of the African Leadership University and Fuse ODG of 'Azonto' and 'Antenna' fame and proponent of 'This is New Africa' (TINA).

She is the author of "Women's' Rights and the Law in Ghana".

== Personal life ==
Johanna Odonkor Svanikier is married to Thomas Svanikier, the founder and executive chairman of Svani Group and share holder of DreamOval Limited. They have three children.
