= Lydia Yaako Donkor =

Ghanaian lawyer and police commissioner

Lydia Yaako Donkor (born 28 October 1974) is a Ghanaian lawyer and police officer. She serves as a Commissioner of Police and the Director-General of the Criminal Investigations Department (CID) of the Ghana Police Service. Donkor is also Chair of the Police Ladies Football Club and Chairperson of the Safety and Security Committee of the Ghana Football Association(GFA).

== Early life and education ==
Donkor was born on 28 October 1974. She attended Wesley Girls High School Capecoast. She earned a Bachelor of Arts degree in Law and Political Science from the University of Ghana, followed by professional legal training at the Ghana School of Law. She later pursued an LL.M. in International and Human Rights Law from the University of Leeds in the United Kingdom.

== Career ==
Donkor began her legal career as an associate at Acquah‑Sampson & Associates, engaging in litigation and legal drafting. She later worked with the Legal Aid Board in Takoradi, where she handled cases related to gender and child rights.

She enlisted in the Ghana Police Service in 2003 as a legal officer and rose through the ranks to become the most senior lawyer within the service. Her previous roles include:

- Head of Legal and Prosecutions in various regional commands
- Divisional and District Commander at Tesano‑Accra
- Member of the United Nations Police (UNPOL) in Liberia, focusing on evaluation and discipline
- Director-General of the Police Professional Standards Bureau (PPSB)

In March 2025, she was appointed Director-General of the CID by Inspector-General of Police Christian Tetteh Yohunu. In July 2025, she partnered with QNET to fight internet fraud and educate the public on scams and safety as CID Director-General.

In July 2025, Donkor was promoted to the rank of Commissioner of Police, reflecting her progression through the senior leadership of the Ghana Police Service. The promotion placed her among the highest-ranking officers in the Service and recognised her professional experience and contributions to policing in Ghana.

In August 2025, Donkor was elected to the newly established INTERPOL Africa Regional Committee, becoming the first Ghanaian woman to serve on the body. Her election marked a significant milestone for Ghana’s participation in international policing and highlighted ongoing efforts to increase gender representation in law-enforcement leadership across the continent.

== Sports administration ==
Donkor has played a significant role in football administration in Ghana:

- Chairperson of the Police Ladies Football Club since 2020
- Chairperson of the Ghana Football Association’s Safety and Security Committee, appointed in 2024
- CAF Safety and Security Officer
- Represented Ghana at the Sports Security Conference in Rome, Italy (January 2024), organized by the UN and Italian Police

== Advocacy and affiliations ==
Donkor is a strong advocate for gender equity and human rights. She holds memberships in:

- Ghana Bar Association
- Police Ladies Association
- International Association of Women Police Officers

== Personal life ==
Lydia Donkor is the daughter of Jane Christie Donkor, the first female Commissioner of Police in Ghana, appointed in 2000. She is known to be a fan of Hearts of Oak and Arsenal.

== See also ==
- Ghana Police Service
- Police Ladies F.C. (Ghana)
