= National Service Secretariat (Ghana) =

Civil conscription agency in Ghana

National Service Secretariat, Ghana
- Ghana National Service Scheme
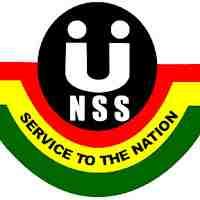

Agency overview
- Formed: 1973
- Jurisdiction: Republic of Ghana
- Headquarters: Ghana
- Parent agency: Ministry of Education (Ghana)
- Website: Official website

Ghanaian students who graduate from accredited tertiary institutions are required under the constitution to do a one-year national service to the country. The National Service Secretariat (NSS) is the Government of Ghana agency mandated to formulate policies and structures for national service.

== Structure of the NSS ==
Organogram of the NSS

The organogram of the service has a Board of Directors. The Board supervises activities of the executive director and two Deputy Executive Directors. One deputy is the Head of Finance and Administration and the other is in charge of the service's operations. The executive director and the Deputies supervise the activities of the Heads of various Departments. At the regional level, the service is headed by the Regional Director who in turn supervises the work of the various district directors. The service has Regional Heads in all the regional capitals of the country. The service has a staff strength of 342.

== Terms of service ==
All graduates from Ghanaian tertiary institutions must complete a one-year mandatory national service. Every year several ten of thousands of graduates are posted to various sectors as service personnel. In 2009 - 2010 service year, about 67,000 graduates were posted. In the 2010 - 2011 service year, 50,069 personnel were posted. The service is done irrespective of type of sponsorship the individual may have received or the country in which the tertiary course was pursued in. The personnel upon posting to an establishment is subject to the rules and regulations that govern it. In a case where the establishment's rules conflict with that of the NSS, the latter's is used. Again, graduates who are sponsored by certain institutions to offer tertiary programmes return to those institutions for their national service.

=== Allowance ===
Service personnel are paid monthly allowances. The amount paid is determined by the Ministry of Finance. The allowance that is approved is what the ministry would pay the personnel throughout the service year. Payment is calculated from the date the service personnel reports for duty at his/her designated post.

=== Annual leave ===
All personnel are entitled to a one month's annual terminal leave for the year that spans their service. The month leave is usually given in August to all personnel.

=== National Service Certificate ===
After completion of the mandatory one-year national service, The National Service Secretariat issues a National Service certificate to all Personnel.

== NSS Ghost Names Scandal ==
In February 2025, the government of Ghana uncovered 81,885 suspected ghost names on the National Service Scheme (NSS) payroll, costing the state an estimated GHȼ50 million per month. Investigations revealed that only 98,145 service personnel were actively working, while 180,030 names had been submitted for allowance payments in 2024.

Former Deputy Executive Director Gifty Oware-Mensah, who oversaw administration and finance, is expected to provide information on the alleged irregularities. In March 2025, she returned to Ghana but was not arrested as planned by the National Investigations Bureau (NIB) and is set to appear before authorities with her legal representatives.

In October 2025, the National Service Authority (NSA) announced new registration for the 2025/2026 service year from October 8 to 15, following a directive from President John Mahama after an audit found the old system flawed. A new digital platform was introduced, and all June 2025 registrations were voided due to data discrepancies.

== See also ==
- National Youth Authority
