= Yaw Ntow Ababio =

Ghanaian politician

Hon. Yaw Ntow Ababio

Member of Parliament for Dormaa East Constituency
- In office 7 January 2009 – 6 January 2013
- President: John Atta Mills; John Mahama
- Succeeded by: William Kwasi Sabi

Member of Parliament for Dormaa East Constituency
- In office 7 January 2005 – 6 January 2009
- President: John Kufuor
- Preceded by: Stephen Adoma-Yeboah

Personal details
- Born: 20 August 1959 (age 67)
- Party: New Patriotic Party
- Children: 4
- Education: University of Cape Coast
- Profession: Managers/Administrators

Yaw Ntow Ababio is a Ghanaian politician. He was a member of parliament for Dormaa East constituency in the Brong-Ahafo Region of Ghana.

== Early life and education ==
Ababio hails from Dormaa-Akwamu in the Brong Ahafo Region of Ghana. He was born on 20 August 1959. He graduated from International Professional Managers Association in the United Kingdom in 2003, with a diploma in Management. He also obtained his master's degree in Administration (Democracy, Governance and Law) at the University of Cape Coast in 2007.

== Career ==
Ababio is a Manager/Administrator. Prior to beginning his career in politics, he worked with Global Haulage Camp. Limited in Accra - Ghana as a Production Manager.

== Politics ==
On the ticket of the New Patriotic Party, Ababio first became a member of parliament for Dormaa East constituency in the Brong Ahafo Region of Ghana after his election in the 2004 Ghanaian general elections. He thus represented the constituency for the first time in the 4th parliament of the 4th republic of Ghana. He was elected with 11,533votes out of 19480 total valid votes cast. This was equivalent to 58.1% of all total valid votes cast. He was elected over Nicholas K. Adjei-Kyeremeh of the National Democratic Congress, Alexander Asante Oppong of the Convention People's Party and Lovea Amponsah of the Democratic People's Party. These obtained 38.00%, 2.90% and 1.00% respectively of all total valid votes cast. In the same elections, the New Partriotic Party won a majority total of 123parliamentary seat representation out of the 230 total seats for the 4th parliament of the 4th republic. The Dormaa East constituency formed part of 14 out of a total 24 parliamentary seats won by the party in the Brong Ahafo region. Ababio as a member of parliament in the 4th parliament also served as a Vice Chairman of the Parliamentary Select Committee on Roads and Transports.

During the 2008 Ghanaian general election he was re-elected on the ticket of the New Patriotic Party as the member of parliament for the Dormaa East constituency. He thus represented the constituency in the 5th parliament of the 4th republic of Ghana. He contested and won 11,363 votes out of the 19,188 valid votes cast. This was equivalent to 59.22% of total valid votes cast. 7 He was elected over Isaac Kofi Kyeremeh of the National Democratic Congress, Samuel Badu of the Democratic Freedom Party, Alexander Asante Oppong of the Convention People's Party and Lovea Amponsah of the Democratic People's Party. These obtained 33.80%, 4.35%, 2.48% and 0.16% respectively of all total valid votes cast. The New Patriotic Party won the majority 16seats out of 24 total parliamentary seats for the Brong Ahafo region in the 2008 Ghanaian general elections. However, they obtained a minority total of 107 out of 230 seats parliamentary representation in the 5th parliament of the 4th republic.

== Personal life ==
Ntow Ababio is married with four children. He is a Christian and a member of the Presbyterian church of Ghana.
