= Vida Yeboah =

Ghanaian educationalist and politician

Vida Amaadi Yeboah

Member of parliament for Akwapim South Constituency
- In office 7 January 1997 – 6 January 2001
- Preceded by: John Jerry Rawlings

Member of parliament for Akwapim South Constituency
- In office 7 January 1993 – 6 January 1997
- President: John Jerry Rawlings

Personal details
- Born: 27 July 1944 Akwapim South, Eastern Region Ghana)
- Died: 25 July 2006 (aged 61)
- Party: National Democratic Congress
- Education: University of Ghana
- Occupation: Politician
- Profession: Teacher, Civic Leader

Vida Amaadi Yeboah (1944-2006) was a former Ghanaian educator, politician and civic leader. She was Ghana's Deputy Minister of Education and Culture from 1988 to 1993. Amaadi Yeboah helped found the Forum for African Women Educationalists (FAWE) in 1992. Elected member of parliament in 1992, Yeboah became a member of Jerry Rawlings' government, serving as tourism minister from 1997 to 2001.

== Early life and education ==
Vida Yeboah was born on 27 July 1944 at her maternal family village in the Eastern Region. She is the daughter of Kate Oye Ntow Ofosu and Eric Perigrino Nelson. She was educated at Wesley Girls High School before gaining her BA in French from the University of Ghana. She then studied for a MA in French from the University of Bordeaux in France, and a post-graduate diploma in education from the University of Cape Coast.

She taught for fourteen years at girls' secondary schools in Ghana. She became the headmistress of Mfantsiman Girls' Secondary School, before being appointed as the Deputy Secretary for Education in 1985.

From 1988 to 1993, Vida Yeboah was Deputy Minister of Education and Culture. Yeboah overhauled the pre-university schooling system, increasing the attendance rates for girls. In 1992, she co-founded the Forum for African Women Educationalists with four other African women ministers of education: Fay Chung in Zimbabwe, Simone Testa in the Seychelles, Paulette Moussavon-Missambo in Gabon, and Alice Tiendrebengo in Burkina Faso.

== Politics ==
Vida Amaadi Yeboah was elected to represent Akuapim South in the first parliament of the fourth republic of Ghana on 7 January 1993 after she was pronounced winner at the 1992 Ghanaian parliamentary election held on 29 December 1992.

She was re-elected into the second parliament of the fourth republic after obtaining 48% of the vote at the 1996 elections. She was appointed in 1997 as the Minister of Tourism where she served till 2001, a ministerial position outside the Cabinet.

== Awards and recognition ==
Vida Yeboah is remembered as one of the four founders of Forum for African Women Educationalists (FAWE) Ghana's Chapter.

== Sources ==
- Vida Amaadi Yeboah at the African People Database
