= Isaac Ababio =

Ghanaian evangelist (1940–2018)

The Reverend Isaac Ababio

Personal details
- Born: Isaac Kofi Asomani Ababio; April 26, 1940 Kwahu Nkwatia, Ghana
- Died: July 6, 2018 (aged 78) Accra, Gold Coast (British colony)
- Denomination: Presbyterian (Presbyterian Church of Ghana)
- Spouse: Grace Appiah-Kusi (m. 1967)
- Children: 6
- Profession: Evangelist
- Education: Accra Academy; Kumasi College of Technology

Isaac Ababio (26 April 1940 - 6 August 2018) was a Ghanaian evangelist. He pioneered radio evangelism in Ghana and founded and served as Director of the Hour of Visitation Choir and Evangelism Association Ministries (H.V.C.E.A), the first evangelistic association in Ghana from 1968 to 2018. He was also one of the founding members of the Scripture Union in Ghana.

== Early life ==
Ababio was born on 26 April 1940 in Kwahu Nkwatia, in the Eastern Region of Ghana. He was the youngest child of Abena Nipaa and Kwaku Abaah, who hailed from Peki-Blengo. His mother died when he was just two years old, and his father also left his life at a young age. Ababio had very little interaction with his father, who had relocated when he was seven years old and was never seen again until news of his father's death reached him at the age of sixteen. Raised by his sisters and uncles in Kwahu Nkwatia, he grew up in a culturally diverse environment as an Ewe and Akan by birth, becoming fluent in both the Akan and English languages.

Ababio's early education took place in the Presbyterian primary and middle schools, which exposed him to memorization of biblical passages. Following this, he entered the Accra Academy in 1956 for his secondary education. It was during the Thanksgiving Service of the Silver Jubilee celebrations of the Accra Academy that he underwent a transformation. He was influenced by a scripture passage from the book of Ecclesiastes 11, which led him to accept Christianity.

In 1960, Ababio was admitted to Kumasi College of Technology, now known as Kwame Nkrumah University of Science and Technology (KNUST), where he pursued a degree in physics. During his time on campus, he became involved in the Christian Fellowship. He read the bible many times, and also engaged in reading Christian literature while listening to messages from Christian figures such as Dr. Billy Graham on the Hour of Decision, Dr. Howard O. Jones on the Hour of Revival, Dr. Stephen Olford on Calvary Hour, and many other Christian radio programmes.

== Career ==
Ababio actively engaged in outreach activities and embarked on evangelism journeys to nearby towns and villages. He introduced Bible Study sessions into the daily programs of Government Voluntary Work Camps, with the inaugural one being the Agbozume Work Camp in the Volta Region. He also participated in evangelistic teams during his university summer breaks.

Ababio participated in and assumed leadership roles in the All for Christ Campaigns, which conducted evangelistic crusades in various locations, including Nkwatia, Akwapim Mampong, Akropong, and Nsawam in the Eastern Region of Ghana. The Nsawam crusades spanned multiple towns and were coordinated by his longtime friend and engineering professor at KNUST, the late Dr. Isaac Allotey.

In 1966, Ababio decided to dedicate himself to full-time ministry as an evangelist. He preached at the Kwame Nkrumah Circle four times a week. That same year, he played a significant role in the first World Congress on Evangelism, where he delivered a paper that emphasised saving the lost. In the latter part of 1966, he commenced his journey as an itinerant evangelist, conducting crusades in various towns and villages across Ghana.

In 1967, he organised crusades at Bukom Square and Baden-Powell Memorial Hall, attracting many young men and women who actively supported his mission. They initiated open-air crusades at Kwame Nkrumah Circle, taking place from Wednesdays to Sundays on a weekly basis for many months. The following year, he founded the Hour of Visitation Choir and Evangelism Association Ministries (H.V.C.E.A) in Kumasi.

By 1968, he had introduced the Hour of Visitation Radio Broadcast on the National Broadcasting Network GBC-2, marking his role as the pioneering radio evangelist in Ghana. He also established the Hour of Visitation Choir to support these radio programmes. The programme continued for fourteen years until 1982, when it was discontinued by the military government of J. J. Rawlings. It later resumed on Radio ELWA in Monrovia, Liberia, from 1987 to 1990 before returning to Ghana. In Ghana, it was broadcast on JOY FM from 1995 to 1999, then moved to a different channel on that network, and ultimately to Spring FM.

In 1969, Ababio and his family relocated to Australia and Papua New Guinea, where he dedicated himself to mission and evangelism work. The family returned to Ghana in December 1973, and in 1974, he relocated to Kumasi to collaborate with the Christian Service College in training individuals for mission and evangelism.

Ababio helped in the establishment, development, and growth of various parachurch organisations, including New Life for All, Christian Outreach Fellowship, Ghana Congress on Evangelisation (GHACOE), Ghana Institute of Linguistics, Literacy, and Bible Translation (GILLBT), and the National Association of Evangelicals (NEA) of Ghana. He served as the inaugural chairperson of the NEA of Ghana from 1992 to 2000 and actively participated in mission activities within universities, schools, and colleges. He continued his affiliation with the Presbyterian Church of Ghana (PCG), and at least one or two PCG churches originated in his home. He was made resident minister of one of the church's branches (the Unity Congregation) in Sunyani.

Ababio also chaired evangelistic crusades for evangelists such as T. L Osborn and Benson Idahosa. He conducted outreach activities through churches and schools and training courses for leadership counsellors across various locations in Ghana.

== Personal life and death ==
In 1967, Ababio married Miss. Grace Appiah-Kusi, and together they had six children. Ababio died on Friday, 6 July 2018, due to complications arising from an orthopaedic surgery. He was buried on 4 August 2018 at the Dzorwulu Presbyterian Church.
