= Grace Amponsah-Ababio =

Ghanaian dentist and diplomat

- Born: 1941 (age 84–85)
- Education: National Technical University of Ukraine
- Occupation: diplomat
- Employer: Ministry of Foreign Affairs

Grace Amponsah-Ababio (born 22 December 1941) is a Ghanaian dentist and a retired diplomat.

== Career ==
From 1967 to 1969, she was a house officer at the Komo Anokye Teaching Hospital in Kumasi. From 1972 to 1974 she was a senior dentist at Korle-Bu Teaching Hospital. From 1974 to 1978 she was a leading dental surgeon at the municipal polyclinic in the district Ussher Fort in Accra. From January 1979 to September 2001 she led her private dental practice. From 1989 to 2001, she was one of the initiators of the "Mobile Dental Clinic" and "Social Dental Outreach" with the dental services for communities in need in Ghana. From September 2001 to September 5, 2004, she was ambassador in The Hague (Netherlands) and was accredited by the Organization for the Prohibition of Chemical Weapons
