= National Youth Authority (Ghana) =

- NYA

Agency overview
- Formed: 1974
- Preceding agency: National Youth Authority
- Jurisdiction: Government of Ghana
- Headquarters: Azumah Nelson Sports Complex aka Kaneshie Complex Dantu Avenue Accra, Ghana; 5.575704°N 0.226122°W
- Motto: Facilitating Youth Development
- Minister responsible: Lawyer George Opare Addo, Minister for Youth Development and Empowerment
- Agency executives: Osman Abdulai Ayariga Esq, Chief Executive Officer; [Alhaji Inusah Mahama], Deputy Chief Executive Officer Operations and Programme; [Jacob Adongo Atule], Deputy Chief Executive Officer, Finance and Administration
- Parent agency: Ministry of Youth Development and Empowerment
- Key document: National Youth Policy of Ghana
- Website: www.nya.gov.gh

The National Youth Authority (NYA) was established in 1974 by NRDC 241. It is thus, a Statutory Public Organization with the mandate to co-ordinate and facilitates youth empowerment activities in Ghana to ensure the development of the Ghanaian youth as a whole.

The Authority was formerly known as "the National Youth Council (NYC)." In 1981, by an administrative directive, the council was transformed into a "Commission" status as "the National Youth Organizing Commission" with the focus to organize a mass national youth movement called the "Democratic Youth League of Ghana (DYLG)."

With the inception of constitutional rule in 1992, the Commission status reverted to the "Council" once more. In consequence of a statute law revision exercise under the laws of Ghana (Revised Edition) Act, 1998 (Act 562), the nomenclature of the Authority was changed to the current, "National Youth Authority".

The National Youth Authority Act, 2016 (Act 939) In 2016, the Parliament of the Republic of Ghana passed the National Youth Authority Act, 2016 (Act 939) which received Presidential assent on 30 December 2016.

The objects of the Authority are - Ref: NYA Act, 2016 (Act 939) (2) to: a) develop the creative potential of the youth; b) develop a dynamic and disciplined youth imbued with a spirit of nationalism, patriotism and a sense of propriety and civic responsibility; and c) Ensure the effective participation of the youth in the development of the country.

Functions : The core functions of the National Youth Authority are - Ref: NYA Act, 2016 (Act 939) (3) to: a) formulate policies and implement programmes that will promote in the youth i. a sense of creativity, self-reliance, leadership, loyalty to the country, discipline and civic responsibility; and ii. a sense of friendship and cooperation through the exchange of ideas with recognized youth organizations in other countries in Africa and the world; b) develop the capacity of the youth to participate in decision-making at all levels; c) establish and supervise youth leadership and skills training institutes; and d) In collaboration with the Ghana Youth Federation, organize annual youth conferences at the national, regional and district levels.

Values: The National Youth Authority is guided by the under listed in the performance of its duties: 1.Discipline 2.Teamwork 3.Patriotism 4.Excellence 5.Hard work

To ensure the above objects and functions are well-coordinated, the National Youth Authority and the supervising sector Ministry has formulated a reviewable National Youth Policy. A first was in 1999, and a revised one launched in August 2010(Currently under Review).

== List of CEOs of National Youth Authority ==
Name	Duration	Government
Pius Enam Hadzide	2021 to 2024	NPP
Osman Abdulai Ayariga Esq	2024 till date	NDC

== See also ==
- National Youth Employment Program
- National Service Secretariat (Ghana)
