= Ghana National Science and Maths Quiz =

STEM competition for students

- Also known as: National Science and Maths Quiz
- Genre: Quiz show
- Presented by: Elsie Effah Kaufmann
- Country of origin: Ghana
- Original language: English

Original release
- Network: GTV; Joy News
- Release: 1993 – present

The National Science and Maths Quiz (NSMQ) is a premier annual academic quiz competition that tests the knowledge and quick-thinking abilities of senior high school students in Ghana in the fields of science and mathematics. Since its inception in 1993, the quiz has been produced and marketed by Primetime Limited, an advertising and public relations agency with a strong focus on educational programming. Over the decades, it has evolved from a simple quiz into a major national cultural and educational phenomenon.

The objective of the National Science & Maths Quiz is to promote the study of the sciences and mathematics, and help students develop quick thinking and a probing and scientific mind about the everyday world around them, while fostering healthy academic rivalry among senior high schools.

The quiz, originally sponsored by Unilever "Brillant Soap," is popularly referred to as "Brilla" by many who have gone through the secondary school system, and it is one of the few academic events that brings all of Ghana's secondary schools together. The National Science and Maths Quiz is the longest running educational programme on national TV. Historically, the quiz was broadcast on GTV Ghana during the quiz season every Saturday at 11am and Wednesday at 4pm. Today, it is telecast on Joy News, Joy Prime, Joy 99.7 FM and various social media platforms.

== History ==
The idea for the production of a quiz programme aimed at encouraging the study of the sciences and mathematics was not mooted at a national science fair or conference. It happened on the tennis court of the University of Ghana, Legon in 1993. Dr. Kwaku Mensa-Bonsu, then managing director of Primetime, was on the court to play a tennis game with his playmates, the late Professors Marian Ewurama Addy and Ebenezer Kweku Awotwe. Dr. Mensa-Bonsu was curious as to why birds could stand on a live electric wire without getting electrocuted, but human beings could not do same. From Awotwe's explanation, Mensa-Bonsu got the idea of putting together a quiz programme on science and mathematics.

When the quiz started, it involved only 32 schools across the country, and these were divided into the Northern Sector and Southern Sector, with 16 schools per sector. Winners in both sectors were then brought to Accra for the national championship. Prempeh College won the maiden edition.

In 1997, the geographical sector system was abandoned, and two northern sector schools (from the old format), Opoku Ware School and Prempeh College made it to the finals where Opoku Ware School won its first trophy.

In 1998, the tournament became known as the National Science & Maths Quiz, when the quiz show lost its original sponsorship from Brilliant Soap. Subsequently, in 2012, the Ghana Education Service, through the Conference of Heads of Assisted Secondary Schools (CHASS) took up the sponsorship of the programme. In terms of participation, beginning in 2000, the number of schools was increased to 40. The number of participating schools again, was increased in 2013 to 81, although 66 ultimately showed up for the competition. Thus, the participation format was changed to a three-team contest instead of the two-team contest that had characterized the competition since its inception in 1993. To give the programme a national character, the quiz has since 2014 involved 135 schools from all parts of Ghana. Since 2014, 108 schools are selected from regional and zonal competitions and qualifiers to join 27 seeded schools (quarter-finalists from the previous year's competition) at the National Championships. The NSMQ regions are Greater Accra, Central, Eastern, and Ashanti Regions, while the zones are Bono-Ahafo, Western, Volta-Oti, and Northern Zones.

The first quiz mistress was the late Professor Marian Ewurama Addy, a professor of biochemistry at the University of Ghana, Legon. She was quiz mistress from 1993 till 2000. “When in 1993/94, during the planning of a televised quiz programme on Science, I was asked to be the quiz mistress, I could not say No”, she wrote in her memoir, Rewards: An Autobiography. “I was interested in females becoming scientists and this was an opportunity to invite the young ones to become scientists… I thought that this was a most effective way of being a role model,” she added. In recognition of her contributions to promoting the study of science and mathematics among girls through the NSMQ, Prof. Addy was named the Marketing Woman of the Year by the Chartered Institute of Marketing Ghana in 1995.

Eureka Emefa Adomako, a botanist at the University of Ghana, Legon, took over as quizmistress from 2001 to 2005, having been recommended by Prof. Addy. Dr. Adomako took charge of the programme until she had to leave for postgraduate studies. Before leaving, just as Prof. Addy recommended her as quiz mistress, Dr. Adomako recommended that Prof. Kaufmann take over as quiz mistress.

In 2006, Prof. Elsie Effah Kaufmann, the founding Head of the Biomedical Engineering Department at the University of Ghana, Legon, took over as quiz mistress. Over the years, she has succeeded in bringing her own style to the programme, occasionally injecting some humour into an otherwise formal programme. As the chairperson of the moderation team, Prof. Kaufmann is supported by a team of consultants made up of Prof. W. A. Asomaning, Dr. Ebenezer Owusu, Dr. Amos Kuditcher, and Dr. Douglas Adu-Gyamfi, all of the University of Ghana, Legon. At the preliminary stages, the quiz is moderated by Drs. Anita Oppong-Quaicoe, Thelma Ohene-Agyei, Gladys Odey Schwinger and Lucy Agyepong.

Presbyterian Boys' Secondary School has been the most successful school in the quiz so far, having made thirteen appearances at the finals, including five consecutive grand finales. The school has won the competition nine times, a record that includes back-to-back wins on two separate occasions (2008 & 2009; 2022 & 2023). Mfantsipim School is the second school to win the competition twice in a row (2024 & 2025). Achimota School is the only coeducational school to have won the competition. No all-girls' school has ever won the competition.

Since its inception, only eleven schools in the country have won the competition. Nine out of the eleven winning schools (representing about 82%) were historically considered 'mission schools' during the British colonial era and are now formally religiously affiliated to four Christian denominations, namely Anglican, Catholic, Methodist and Presbyterian churches. Furthermore, only five out Ghana's sixteen administrative regions (representing approximately 31%) have produced winners - Greater Accra, Ashanti, Central, Eastern and Western Regions.

In 2021, Primetime Limited launched the STEM Festival comprising Mentorship Sessions and the Sci-Tech Fair. The Sci-Tech Fair component includes a Sci-Tech Innovation Challenge and an Exhibition open to Senior High Schools, Basic and Junior High Schools, Tech firms and start-ups.

=== List of main hosts and quiz mistresses ===
- Marian Ewurama Addy, 1993–2000
- Eureka Emefa Adomako, 2001–2005
- Elsie Effah Kaufmann, 2006–present

== Quiz structure ==
Three schools compete in each contest and each school is represented by two contestants. The current quiz mistress is Dr. Elsie Effah Kaufmann. Presently, every contest is composed of five rounds with the following rules:

- Round 1 — The round of fundamental questions. Each contesting school has to answer 4 Biology, 4 Chemistry, 4 Physics and 4 Mathematics questions. A wrongly answered question may be carried over as a bonus. Partial credit is sometimes awarded by the quiz mistress.
- Round 2 — This round is called the speed race. All three schools are presented with the same mainly applied questions at the same time. A school answers a question by ringing the bell. There are no partial credits at this stage and a school gains a maximum of three points for answering a question correctly.
- Round 3 — This round is known as the Problem of the Day. The contestants are required to solve a single question, worth 10 points, within 4 minutes.
- Round 4 — True or False statements are given to the contestants in turns. The objective is to determine whether each statement is true or false. A correctly answered question fetches 2 points. A wrongly answered question attracts a penalty of -1 point. One may decide not to answer a question, in which case it will be carried over to the next contesting school as a bonus for the full benefit of the two points.
- Round 5 — Riddles; clues are given to the contesting schools. The schools compete against each other to find the answers to the riddles. Getting the correct answer on the first clue fetches 5 points. On the second clue, 4 points are awarded for a correct answer. On the third or any other subsequent clue, a question answered correctly is given 3 points. There are 4 riddles in all.

== Overall records and statistics ==
=== List of past winners and finalists ===
Year	Winners	1st Runner-up	2nd Runner-up
1994	Prempeh College	Achimota School	
1995	Presbyterian Boys’ Secondary School	Opoku Ware School	
1996	Prempeh College	Presbyterian Boys' Secondary School	
1997	Opoku Ware School	Prempeh College	
1998	Achimota School	St. Peter's Senior High School	
1999	Mfantsipim School	Wesley Girls' High School	
2000	St. Peter's Senior High School	Mfantsipim School	
2001	Pope John Senior High School and Minor Seminary	Ghana Secondary Technical School	
2002	Opoku Ware School	St. Peter's Senior High School	
2003	Presbyterian Boys’ Secondary School	Opoku Ware School	
2004	Achimota School	St. Peter's Senior High School	
2005	St. Peter's Senior High School	Opoku Ware School	
2006	Presbyterian Boys’ Secondary School	St. Peter's Senior High School	
2007	St. Augustine's College	Kumasi Anglican Senior High School	
2008	Presbyterian Boys’ Secondary School	Opoku Ware School	
2009	Presbyterian Boys’ Secondary School	Achimota School	
2010	No competition held		
2011	No competition held		
2012	Ghana Secondary Technical School	St. Francis Xavier Minor Seminary	
2013	St. Thomas Aquinas Senior High School	Presbyterian Boys' Secondary School	Mfantsiman Girls' Senior High School
2014	Mfantsipim School	Ghana Secondary Technical School	St. Francis Xavier Minor Seminary
2015	Prempeh College	Adisadel College	University Practice Senior High School
2016	Adisadel College	Opoku Ware School	Mfantsipim School
2017	Prempeh College	St. Thomas Aquinas Senior High School	Adisadel College
2018	St. Peter's Senior High School	West Africa Senior High School	Adisadel College
2019	St. Augustine's College	Presbyterian Boys’ Secondary School	St. Peter's Senior High School
2020	Presbyterian Boys’ Secondary School	Adisadel College	Opoku Ware School
2021	Prempeh College	Presbyterian Boys’ Secondary School	Keta Senior High Technical School
2022	Presbyterian Boys’ Secondary School	Prempeh College	Adisadel College
2023	Presbyterian Boys’ Secondary School	Achimota School	Opoku Ware School
2024	Mfantsipim School	St. Augustine's College	Keta Senior High Technical School
2025	Mfantsipim School	St. Augustine's College	Opoku Ware School
2026	Presbyterian Boys’ Secondary School	Accra Academy	St. Augustine's College

=== Ranking ===
==== League of Finalists ====
Rank	School	Region	Wins (Ist Place)	1st Runner-up (2nd Place)	2nd Runner-up (3rd Place)	Total finals appearance s	Years won	Years 1st runner-up	Years 2nd runner-up	Win Conversion Rate (%)
1	Presbyterian Boys' Secondary School	Greater Accra	9	4	0	13	1995, 2003, 2006, 2008, 2009, 2020, 2022, 2023, 2026	1996, 2013, 2019, 2021	–	69%
2	Prempeh College	Ashanti	5	2	0	7	1994, 1996, 2015, 2017, 2021	1997, 2022	–	71%
3	Mfantsipim School	Central	4	1	1	6	1999, 2014, 2024, 2025	2000	2016	67%
4	St. Peter's Senior High School	Eastern	3	4	1	8	2000, 2005, 2018	1998, 2002, 2004, 2006	2019	38%
5	Opoku Ware School	Ashanti	2	5	3	10	1997, 2002	1995, 2003, 2005, 2008, 2016	2020, 2023, 2025	20%
6	Achimota School	Greater Accra	2	3	0	5	1998, 2004	1994, 2009, 2023	–	40%
7	St. Augustine's College	Central	2	2	1	5	2007, 2019	2024, 2025	2026	40%
8	Adisadel College	Central	1	2	3	6	2016	2015, 2020	2017, 2018, 2022	17%
9	Ghana Secondary Technical School	Western	1	2	0	3	2012	2001, 2014	–	33%
10	St. Thomas Aquinas Senior High School	Greater Accra	1	1	0	2	2013	2017	–	50%
11	Pope John Senior High School and Minor Seminary	Eastern	1	0	0	1	2001	–	–	100%
12	St. Francis Xavier Minor Seminary	Upper West	0	1	1	2	–	2012	2014	0%
13	Accra Academy	Greater Accra	0	1	0	1	–	2026	–	0%
13	West Africa Senior High School	Greater Accra	0	1	0	1	–	2018	–	0%
13	Kumasi Anglican Senior High School	Ashanti	0	1	0	1	–	2007	–	0%
13	Wesley Girls' High School	Central	0	1	0	1	–	1999	–	0%
17	Keta Senior High Technical School	Volta	0	0	2	2	–	–	2021, 2024	0%
18	University Practice Senior High School	Central	0		1	1	–	–	2015	0%
18	Mfantsiman Girls' Senior High School	Central	0	0	1	1	–	–	2013	0%

==== Regional Distribution of Finalist Medal Tally ====
Rank	Region	Wins (1st Place)	1st Runner-up (2nd Place)	2nd Runner-up (3rd Place)	Total Medals	Win Conversion Rate (%)
1	Greater Accra	12	9	1	22	55%
2	Central	7	6	7	20	37%
3	Ashanti	7	8	3	18	39%
4	Eastern	4	4	1	9	44%
5	Western	1	2	0	3	33%
6	Upper West	0	1	1	2	0%
7	Volta	0	0	2	2	0%
8	Ahafo	0	0	0	0	0%
9	Bono	0	0	0	0	0%
10	Bono East	0	0	0	0	0%
11	North East Region	0	0	0	0	0%
12	Northern	0	0	0	0	0%
13	Oti	0	0	0	0	0%
14	Savannah	0	0	0	0	0%
15	Upper East	0	0	0	0	0%
16	Western North	0	0	0	0	0%

=== Other rankings ===
==== EN Analytics ranking ====
The EN Analytics Rankings is an alternative ranking of senior high schools based on performance in the NSMQ. The 2025 ranking was based on data from 260 senior high schools across Ghana's 16 regions.

The ranking considers four parameters: the stage reached by a school at the national level in the NSMQ competition, its placement in its final national contest, its category assigned by the Ghana Education Service, and its historical NSMQ performance from 2013 to 2024. The points are exponentially smoothed to place greater emphasis on more recent performances.

EN Analytics national ranking — top 20 schools
2025 rank	School	2025 points	2024 rank	2023 rank	2022 rank	2021 rank
1	Presbyterian Boys' Secondary School	715	1	1	3	3
2	Prempeh College	645	2	2	1	2
3	Mfantsipim School	615	4	5	5	6
4	Adisadel College	597	3	3	2	1
5	Opoku Ware School	530	5	4	4	4
6	Keta SHTS	492.5	6	6	7	8
7	St. Peter's SHS	420	7	7	6	5
8	St. Augustine's College	415	8	12	11	14
9	Accra Academy	370	9	9	9	10
10	St. Thomas Aquinas SHS	364	10	8	8	7
11	University Practice SHS	347	12	10	10	9
12	Ghana National College	342.5	13	14	12	12
13	Wesley Girls' High School	342	11	11	13	11
14	Achimota School	315	15	15	25	24
15	Ghana Secondary Technical School	305	17	16	16	12
16	Kumasi High School	294	14	13	13	16
17	Tamale SHS	277	16	18	18	18
18	Pope John's Minor Seminary and SHS	265	22	25	26	29
19	Koforidua Secondary Technical School	265	19	24	20	18
20	KNUST SHS	256	18	17	15	14

According to EN Analytics, the national ranking is cumulative and is not determined by a school's performance in a single NSMQ year. Regional competitions do not count towards a school's national ranking.

== Awards ==
- TV Programme of the Year, 2017, 2022, 2023 (CIMG Awards)
- Six Gold Awards (Branded PR, Digital, Social Media, Print, Integrated Campaign, Television), 15th Advertising Association of Ghana (AAG) Gong Gong Awards, 2021
- New Media Campaign of the Year, 2022 (CIMG Awards)

== See also ==
- List of senior secondary schools in Ghana
