= St Rose's Senior High (Akwatia) =

Location
- PO Box 31; Akwatia, Eastern Region; Ghana; 6°02′18″N 0°48′53″W

Information
- Type: Public high school
- Motto: Latin: Veritas (Truth)
- Religious affiliation: Catholicism
- Denomination: Dominican Order
- Established: 1965 (61 years ago)
- Founder: Dominican Sisters
- Sister school: St. Peter's Boys Senior Secondary School
- School district: Denchembour District
- Oversight: Ministry of Education
- Headmistress: Marian Jackson
- Gender: Girls
- Age: 14 to 18
- Classes offered: General arts, home economics, science
- Houses: 6
- Colours: Blue and white
- Slogan: Truth and responsibility
- Nickname: Rosec
- Website: strosesshs.com

St Rose's Senior High (Rosec or Roses) is a public Catholic high school for girls, located in Akwatia in the Eastern Region of Ghana. The second-cycle high school was founded in 1965 by the Dominican Sisters.

== History ==
St Rose's Senior High School is one of the girls' schools in the Eastern Region being managed by the Catholic Church. St. Rose's Senior High School (Formerly St. Roses Secondary School) was founded in November 1965 by the Dominican Sisters from Speyer, Germany. The Dominican founding Sisters were; Rev. Sr. Victricia Koch, who was then the Superior General of the Dominican Sisters in Ghana; Rev. Sr. Beatrix Koob, Rev. Sr. Zita Simon and Rev. Sr. Solamen Ott. They were brought to Ghana by the Most Reverend Bishop Joseph Oliver Bowers, the then Bishop of the Accra Diocese of the Catholic Church.

The school first started as a teacher training college with 80 students but in September 1969, the teacher training college was changed over into a secondary school with the initial enrollment of 80 students. Barima Kofi Bempong II, the then chief of Akwatia, the Akwatia Traditional Council and the Akwatia Town Development Committee passed a resolution that gave birth to the establishment of the school. The school`s motto 'veritas' a Latin word which means truth and responsibility evokes strong integrity and discipline among its patrons. Current students of St.roses are called 'Rosecans' while old students are called 'Rosas'. Each batch of students have a special name and a particular color of uniform.

== Alliance ==
The school has an ongoing alliance with its fellow Roman Catholic boys' school St. Peter's Boys Senior Secondary School (called Sperosa).

== Competitions ==
They have been competing in the Ghana National Science and Maths Quiz over the years.

== Notable alumni ==
- Marietta Brew Appiah-Oppong, lawyer and politician
- Eureka Emefa Adomako, botanist, researcher and academic
- Hafisata Amaleboba, Justice of the Supreme Court of Ghana (2025–)
- Abena Amoah, investment banker
- Francisca Oteng-Mensah, politician
- Patricia Obo-Nai, Vodafone Ghana/CEO
- Nana Ama Dokua Asiamah Adjei, politician
- Nana Anima Wiafe-Akenten, media practitioner and academic
- Sandra "Alexandrina" Don-Arthur, International Makeup artist and beauty mogul
- Marian Asantewah Nkansah FGA, environmental chemist
- Sandra Opoku, acting director of Ghana Ports
- Phyllis Osei, police officer
- Caryn Agyeman Prempeh, medical practitioner and television personality

== See also ==
- Education in Ghana
- List of senior high schools in Ghana
- Roman Catholicism in Ghana
- Women in Ghana
