= Marian Ewurama Addy =

Ghanaian biochemist (1942–2014)

Marian Ewurama Addy FGA OV
- Addy wearing the Order of the Volta
- Born: Marian Ewurama Cole; 7 February 1942; Nkawkaw, Gold Coast
- Died: 14 January 2014 (aged 71); Accra, Ghana
- Resting place: Saltpond, Ghana
- Education: University of Ghana (BSc); Pennsylvania State University (M.Sc., Ph.D)
- Known for: First Ghanaian woman professor of natural science; First Host, National Science and Maths Quiz; Girl child education advocacy; Contributions to science education and the biochemistry of herbal medicine
- Spouse: Ebenezer Addy
- Awards: Kalinga Prize (1999)
- Scientific career
- Fields: Biochemistry of herbal medicine
- Workplaces: University of Ghana, Legon

Marian Ewurama Addy FGA OV (née Cole; 7 February 1942 – 14 January 2014) was a Ghanaian biochemist and the first Host of the National Science and Maths Quiz. The first Ghanaian woman to attain the rank of full professor of natural science, Addy became a role model for school girls and budding female scientists on the limitless opportunities in science, technology, engineering and mathematics (STEM) disciplines. Marian Addy was also a Fellow of the Ghana Academy of Arts and Sciences, elected in 1999. In the same year, she was awarded the UNESCO Kalinga Prize for the Popularization of Science.

== Early life and education ==
Marian Ewurama Cole was born 7 February 1942 in Nkawkaw in the Eastern Region of Ghana, to Samuel Joseph Cole and Angelina Kwofie Cole. She was educated at St Monica's Secondary School in Mampong-Ashanti from January 1956 to June 1960 where she excelled in sports and obtained her 'O' and 'A' level certificates. She also attended the Holy Child Girls' School in Cape Coast. She earned her Bachelor's degree with first class honours in botany with chemistry from the University of Ghana, Legon. She later obtained a master's degree and a doctorate in biochemistry from the Pennsylvania State University.

== Career ==
Addy reached the rank of full professor of biochemistry at the University of Ghana, where she was not only the first female professor in the sciences at the university, but also in Ghana as a whole country. At the same university, she became the Head of the Department for Biochemistry, Cell and Molecular Biology from 1988 to 1991 and 1994 to 1997. Addy retired in 2002 as a Professor of Biochemistry.

During her time as a professor and department head, she was a chair for the Policy Committee on Developing Countries (PCDC) and chaired the National Board for Professional and Technicians Examinations (NABPTEX). She served as the program director for the Accra-based Science Education Programme for Africa (SEPA), a Pan African programme for pre-tertiary science education in the 1970s. She served on the Kwami Committee, a technical committee on polytechnic education set up by the National Council for Tertiary Education (NCTE), to study and recommend policies to assist the Ghanaian government in supporting polytechnic education.

In 1994, she was a member of a 4-member UNDP team of consultants in Ghana tasked with formulating a National Action Program for Science and Technology Development. She was a board member of the Ghana Atomic Energy Commission from 1996 to 1998. She served as a member of WHO Regional Expert Committee on Traditional Medicine, and worked as an advisor to the International Foundation for Science, in Stockholm, Sweden. She was the Founder and First Executive Secretary of Western Africa Network of Natural Products Research Scientists (WANNPRES), which was established in February 2002.

She had extensive experience in both basic and applied science, lecturing to undergraduate, post-graduate, dental and medical students at the University of Ghana, Legon and subsequently at Howard University College of Medicine in Washington DC.

In January 2008, Addy was appointed as the first President of the Anglican University College of Technology, a technology initiative in higher education.

Her autobiography, "Rewards" was published in 2011.

Together with her sisters, Jane and Elizabeth, she instituted an Award for the “Best Girl” at her alma mater, St Monica's Secondary School. The Ghanaian government appointed her an Officer of the Order of the Volta for her contributions to science and girl-child education.

=== Research ===
Addy's focus of academic research was the biochemistry of herbal medicinal products used by traditional medical practitioners to treat common ailments; especially in areas relating to their safety and efficacy. Her research on the flowering legume Desmodium adscendens used by herbalists to treat asthma and allergies showed that the active ingredient was a new class of compounds now called soyasaponins. This helped verify the use of such medicines for asthma and Type 2 diabetes. Her research on the biochemistry of diabetes mellitus led to the improvement of herbal plant formulations for the treatment of the condition. During her life, Marian Ewurama Addy published 22 research publications pertaining to asthma, anaphylaxis, Type 2 diabetes, and hypertension in relation to herbal treatments.

=== National Science and Maths Quiz ===
One of Addy's major contributions to Ghana, and anyone who watched it, was the National Science and Math Quiz show. This quiz show provided senior secondary school students around Ghana the opportunity to compete in a skills math and science quiz. Addy's main purpose in starting the show was to promote science and math to the public and show its importance in daily life, as well as, to influence more children, especially young girls, to go into the field of science. She was the shows first Quiz Mistress and made many appearances to the schools and clubs competing in the competition. Her influence in the general science knowledge of the youth of Ghana led to more females being interested and pursuing STEM related fields of study. She served as the quiz mistress from 2001, she subsequently recommended Eureka Emefa Adomako to replace her in that role.

== Personal life ==
Marian Ewurama Addy was married to Ebenezer Charles Oko Addy, a sociologist and former athlete who won a gold medal in the 4 x 100 metres relay at the 1966 Commonwealth Games in Kingston, Jamaica. The couple had two daughters, Naa Lamiley Addy-Sadowsky and Lamiokor Esi Addy.

== Death and legacy ==
She died of natural causes on 14 January 2014 at the Korle-Bu Teaching Hospital in Accra. She was buried on 1 March 2014 in Saltpond, a historic coastal town in the Central Region of Ghana. A science laboratory at the Department of Biochemistry, Cell and Molecular Biology at the University of Ghana, was named the “Marian Ewurama Addy Laboratory for Medicinal Plants and Natural Products Research” in her honour. The biochemistry department also instituted the annual Professor Marian Ewurama Addy Memorial Lecture in her memory. Her research work in the medicinal biochemistry of herbal products made herbal medicine more popular and acceptable to the scientific community. National Science and Math Quiz still occurs every year and continues to bring science to the forefront of the public thought and promote math and science to young children.

== Awards and honours ==
- Shell Prize, awarded by the Shell Company, Ghana Ltd, to the top six candidates who passed the General Certificate of Examinations, "A" Level, 1962
- McCallien Prize, awarded to the best student in Volta Hall, the female hall of residence, 1963
- Waddell Prize, awarded to the best science student, 1962–66
- California Prize, awarded by the Chemistry Department, University of Ghana, to the best freshman in Chemistry, 1962–63
- Fellow, African Graduate Fellowship Program (AFGRAD) of the African-American Institute, 1966–71
- Fellow of the International Seminar in Chemistry, at Uppsala University, Uppsala Sweden, 1985–86
- Fulbright African Senior Scientist Award in 1990
- CIMG Marketing Woman of the Year, in 1995, for marketing Science.
- The Africa-America Institute's Distinguished Alumna for Excellence in 1998.
- UNESCO Kalinga Prize for the Popularization of Science in 1999.
- The Millennium Excellence Award for Educational Development in 1999.
- Inducted as a Fellow of the Ghana Academy of Arts and Sciences in 1999.
- National Award by the Enterprise Insurance Company Limited on the occasion of their 75th anniversary in 1999, for "invaluable contribution to educating Ghana's children and for creating enthusiasm in Mathematics and the Sciences"

== Books ==
- Condensation of free [alpha]-amino acids as a pro-biological polymerization system (1971)
- Genetic Demonstrations: Instructor's Manual (1980); co-authored with Ebenezer Laing and Carol Markwei
- Putting Science into the Art of Healing with Herbs: From Smoked-drum Kymograph to ELISA (2003)
- Training the Next Generation of Scientists (2004)
- Rewards: An Autobiography (2011)
