= Amevi Akapovi =

Ghanaian engineer and academic

Professor Amevi Acakpovi
- Occupations: Academic, engineer
- Employer: Accra Technical University
- Known for: Energy systems research, university leadership
- Title: Vice-Chancellor

Academic work
- Discipline: Electrical and energy systems engineering

Amevi Acakpovi is a Ghanaian academic and engineer who serves as the Vice-Chancellor of Accra Technical University (ATU). He specializes in electrical and energy systems engineering, with research focused on renewable energy, hybrid power systems, smart grids, and microgrid optimization.

== Early life and education ==
Acakpovi completed a Bachelor of Science degree in Computer and Electrical Engineering from the Lokossa Institute of Technology in Benin in 2006, followed by a master's degree in Electrical Engineering from the University of Abomey-Calavi in 2009. He received a Doctor of Philosophy (PhD) in Energy Systems Engineering from Open University Malaysia in 2017. He obtained a Postgraduate Certificate in International Higher Education Practice from Coventry University in 2018 and a certificate in doctoral supervision at Stellenbosch University.

== Career ==
Acakpovi spent his academic career at Accra Technical University, serving as Head of the Electrical/Electronics Engineering Department from 2012 to 2018 and Dean of the Faculty of Engineering from 2018 to 2020. He was appointed Pro Vice-Chancellor in December 2020, having previously held the role on an acting basis in 2019 and 2020. He assumed the role of Acting Vice-Chancellor in July 2023.

The university's Governing Council appointed him as the substantive Vice-Chancellor in January 2026. He launched the 2026–2030 Strategic Plan to align with the Sustainable Development Goals and the African Union's Agenda 2063. He expanded the academic curriculum by securing accreditation for 12 master's programs and 25 Bachelor of Technology programs. He established an industry partnership with Nestlé Ghana to train female engineering students in mechanical and electrical disciplines.

Acakpovi secured over $2.3 million in competitive research and institutional development grants. He led the establishment of the Sustainable Energy Service Centre at the university through the Millennium Challenge Corporation and acquired a GIZ grant to train energy auditors. He served as the institutional lead for grants from the Ghana Skills Development Fund, the Mastercard Foundation ACTIVATE Project, and the Design and Technology Institute.

== Research ==
Acakpovi researches energy systems engineering, specializing in hybrid renewable energy systems, smart grid modeling, and electromagnetic compatibility. He develops microgrid designs and applies artificial intelligence and Internet of Things (IoT) technology to power systems. He has authored over 150 peer-reviewed journal articles and conference papers. Accra Technical University hosted its first international academic conference in 2025 during his tenure, producing more than 200 peer-reviewed publications. He acts as a scientific reviewer and editorial board member for international journals published by IEEE, Springer, and Elsevier.

== Professional affiliations ==
He is a Fellow Professional Engineer with the Institution of Engineering and Technology, Ghana, and holds Senior Member status in the Institute of Electrical and Electronics Engineers (IEEE). He serves as President of the International Electrotechnical Commission (IEC) National Committee of Ghana and chairs the African Electrotechnical Standardization Commission (AFSEC) Technical Committee 77.

== Awards ==
Professional bodies in Ghana named Acakpovi the Best Engineering Technologist of the Year 2025. He received the Best Researcher Award at the International Young Scientist Awards in 2023. He won the Decade Researcher Award at the Applied Research Conference in Africa in August 2021. The Solarquarter Grandmaster Awards recognized him for Excellence in Research and Development Leadership in February 2023. Accra Technical University received national recognition for SDG Research under his administration.
