= Janet Husband =

Physician; consultant radiologist

Dame Janet Husband DBE FRCR FMedSci
- Born: Janet Elizabeth Siarey
- Education: Headington School, Oxford
- Known for: Cancer imaging, diagnostic radiology
- Awards: OBE (2002), DBE (2007), Emeritus Professor of Radiology at the Institute of Cancer Research (2007)
- Scientific career
- Fields: Radiology, clinical oncology
- Institutions: Royal Marsden, Institute of Cancer Research, Royal College of Radiologists, National Cancer Research Institute

Dame Janet Elizabeth Husband (née Siarey) is emeritus Professor of Radiology at the Institute of Cancer Research. She had a career in diagnostic radiology that spanned nearly 40 years, using scanning technology to diagnose, stage, and follow-up cancer. She continues to support medicine and research as a board member and advisor for various organisations.

== Education ==
Janet Elizabeth Siarey was educated at Headington School, Oxford. In 1963, after qualifying in medicine at Guy's Hospital, she married Peter Husband. She worked as a general practitioner while raising her three sons. Janet Husband is one of the first women to train in radiology part-time.

== Career ==
Husband began research on the prototype of the world's first CT body scanner at Northwick Park Hospital. She was later appointed to the Royal Marsden as a Research Fellow, focusing on cross-sectional cancer imaging. She was appointed as consultant radiologist to the Royal Marsden in 1980 and Director of the CRUK Clinical Magnetic Resonance Research Group at the Institute of Cancer Research in 1986. She led clinical research in CT and MRI scanning in cancer care, publishing over 200 papers and books.

She was one of the first people to use whole body CT scanning, and the first person to perform a CT guided biopsy in the UK. Her particular research focus was imaging treated cancer: she created rules of partial response or likely remission that are still in use.

In 1996, Husband was awarded a personal chair as head of the Academic Department of Radiology, and in 1998, Husband and Professor Rodney Reznek founded the International Cancer Imaging Society. She was selected as a Fellow of the Academy of Medical Sciences in 2001 and was appointed medical director of the Royal Marsden in 2003. She was also appointed president of the British Institute of Radiology at this time.

Husband was elected president of the Royal College of Radiologists in 2004, holding the role until 2007. She was also the vice chair of the Academy of Medical Royal Colleges from 2005 to 2007. She retired from full-time clinical practice as a consultant radiologist at the NHS Foundation Trust in September 2007.

== Post-retirement roles ==
In 2007, Elizabeth II appointed Husband Special Commissioner to the Royal Hospital Chelsea. She is an independent non-executive director of Spire Healthcare.

Husband took up a post as the Chair of the National Cancer Research Institute in April 2011, the radiologist taking the post 100 years after Marie Curie won her second Nobel Prize for her work on radium.

In June 2014, Husband became the Non-Executive Director of the Royal Marsden.

== Awards and honours ==
- Member of Society of Computed Body Tomography (USA; 1980)
- Fellow, Academy of Medical Sciences (2001)
- Hon. Fellowship of the Faculty of Radiology, Royal College of Surgeons in Ireland (Ireland; 2005)
- Hon. Fellowship of the Academy of Medicine, Singapore (2005)
- Hon. Membership of the Radiological Society of North America (2005)
- Member, Council of the General Medical Council (2005–08)
- Vice Chair, Academy of Medical Royal Colleges (2005–2007)
- Gold Medal, European Congress of Radiology and the European Association of Radiology (2006)
- Honorary Fellowship Hong Kong College of Radiologists (2007)
- Gold Medal, Royal College of Radiologists (2008)
- Honorary Fellowship of Royal College of Physicians and Surgeons of Glasgow (2008)
- Hon. Membership, European Society of Therapeutic and Radiation Oncology (1999)
- Hon. Doctor of Science Institute of Cancer Research, University of London (2013)

Husband was appointed OBE in 2002 and DBE in 2007 "for services to medicine".
