= Elsie Effah Kaufmann Foundation =

Ghanaian STEM nonprofit

The Elsie Effah Kaufmann Foundation (EEKF) is a nonprofit organization that works to improve STEM (science, technology, engineering, and math) education in Ghana.

Elsie Effah Kaufmann founded the EEKF in Accra on July 27, 2022. The foundation's goal is to address the current gap in STEM education in Ghana by providing students with the tools necessary to conduct extensive, practical research on the subjects.

The foundation aims to raise awareness and educate communities about the value of practical STEM education as well as connect and facilitate cooperation between industry and academia.

== Launch ==
The official launch of the foundation took place on July 27, 2022, in Accra. Delegates from science institutions in Ghana attended the ceremony. There were also representatives from the National Teaching Council, GhanaThink, the West African Examination Council (WAEC), the US Embassy, and other well-known organizations in the nation.

The Elsie Effah Kaufmann Foundation (EEKF) is a non-profit foundation which seeks to improve the teaching of STEM subjects in Ghana. The foundation hope to achieve this goal by giving students access to the resources they need for an in-depth and hands-on study of the disciplines, the Elsie Effah Kaufmann Foundation (EEKF) aims to fill the gap in STEM education currently present in Ghana.

The foundation's primary goal is to completely overhaul science education from the ground up, or from the most fundamental level. Since primary grades four through six now follow a new curriculum based on standards and emphasizing practical science, the foundation concentrates on them.

Additionally, the EEKF would train science instructors to better prepare them to teach the topic in a way that encourages students to pursue STEM fields.

Effah Kaufmann at the launch demonstrated how to produce power at the launch, bringing science down to the level of the average person. She showed the guests a basic method of producing power and explained that as learning progressed, the interest was generated and built upon to complicated levels. The guests were taught how to power a light bulb using a plastic casing, copper nails and zinc wires, 'banku', and salt. The participants built a plastic battery and used the copper nails and zinc wires, 'banku', and salt to light the bulb.

=== Project Alpha ===
The purpose of this project is to demystify the teaching and learning of science in Ghanaian Schools and also advocate for the usage of the science set in different schools to make science education more practical,

This project was launched as part of "Celebrating a year's impact of practical science education in basic schools," to commemorate the EEK Foundation's first anniversary which took place at the British Council in Accra. Students and instructors from over a hundred schools participated in practical and hands-on science projects during this event.

Elsie Effah Kaufmann, who has taught and engaged with several scientific students over the years, is certain that providing students with more practical instruction starting in elementary school would be the best investment in them.

Kaufmann emphasizes the urgency of this initiative by stating that, “The time for change is now, parents, teachers, and schools, we cannot compromise. We cannot afford to make a difference now. We need the change. Help us to make science more practical. Help us to make our education more relevant.”

The project is made possible through partnership between the foundation and Dext Technology, which makes the scientific kit available for the practical sessions.

As part of this project, scientific sets serving as an all-in-one laboratory are made available to schools to solve their lack access to adequate science resources. Students can use these sets to conduct a variety of experiments that will improve their hands-on learning experience and help them comprehend science subjects more deeply.

Also as part of the Project Alpha, a free online platform is made available by the Elsie Effah Kaufmann Foundation with support from Dext Technology Limited to track, assess, and maintain STEM (science, technology, engineering, and mathematics) initiatives nationwide.

The STEM Code platform is intended to give basic schools a special code upon registration, enabling them to complete and evaluate a variety of practical science projects. Officials from the Ghana Education Service (GES) and the West African Examinations Council (WAEC) would then award points based on the completion of these tasks .

The platform is also created to help those involved in the STEM field monitor, assess and reward educators and institutions that are dedicated to giving students the hands-on STEM education they need.

=== Impact ===
- The Foundation in just one year, has trained teachers in six regions of Ghana and impacted over 15,000 students.
- Since the STEM Code online platform as part of the Project Alpha was launched, and registration period commenced, 650 schools have registered to benefit from the project
- In Ghana, more than 200 schools and counting are adapting to the new scientific curriculum for elementary schools as a result of the impact of Project Alpha
