= Zhuo Renxi =

Chinese chemist (1931–2019)

- 卓仁禧
- Born: 12 February 1931; Xiamen, Fujian, China
- Died: 6 August 2019 (aged 88); Wuhan, Hubei, China
- Education: Nankai University; Fudan University
- Scientific career
- Fields: Biomedical materials, polymer, organosilicon chemistry
- Workplaces: Wuhan University
- Notable students: Hai-Quan Mao

Zhuo Renxi (Chinese: 卓仁禧; 12 February 1931 – 6 August 2019) was a Chinese chemist who specialized in biomaterial research. He served as professor and Chair of the Department of Chemistry of Wuhan University. He was an academician of the Chinese Academy of Sciences and a Fellow of Biomaterials Science and Engineering.

== Early life and education ==
Zhuo was born on 12 February 1931 in Xiamen, Fujian, Republic of China. After graduating from the Department of Chemistry of Fudan University, he was assigned to teach at Wuhan University as an assistant professor. From 1957 to 1959, he furthered his studies at Nankai University, where he conducted research in organosilicon chemistry under the guidance of Soviet experts.

After returning to Wuhan University, he was promoted to lecturer in 1960, associate professor in 1978, and full professor in 1982. From 1983 to 1984, he was a visiting scholar at Yale University in the United States. He later served as Chair of the Department of Chemistry of Wuhan University.

== Research career ==
In 1972, Zhuo developed an organosilicon-based anti-fogging coating for optical glass, which was widely used in military telescopes and telescopic sights. After the death of Mao Zedong in 1976, Zhuo developed anti-fogging coating for Mao's crystal coffin that is displayed in his mausoleum.

From the 1980s, Zhuo focused on biomedical polymer research. He led the Biomedical Materials Laboratory at Wuhan University, which was designated a national key laboratory in 2003. He was an editor for multiple research journals including Chinese Journal of Reactive Polymers, Chinese Journal of Polymer Science, and Polymer International.

For his significant contributions to the research of organosilicon chemistry and biomaterials, Zhuo was awarded multiple national and ministerial awards in natural sciences, including two National Science Congress awards. He was elected an academician of the Chinese Academy of Sciences in 1997 and a Fellow of Biomaterials Science and Engineering in 2000.

== Later life ==
Zhuo retired in December 2018. He died in Wuhan on 6 August 2019, at the age of 88.
