= Julia Mavrogordato =

English printmaker (1903–1992)

Julia Mary Mavrogordato (1903-1992, married surname Playfair) was an English print-maker and painter.

== Personal life ==
Mavrogordato was born in Shanklin, Isle of Wight, on 28 March 1903. Her mother, Elsie Napier-Bell (1876-1958) was an artist and illustrator from New Zealand, and her father, Eustratius Emmanuel Mavrogordato (1870-1946), was of Greek descent, a barrister and journalist, and for some time the chief tennis correspondent of The Times. She was educated at Headington High School for Girls in Oxford and at St Hilda's Hall, Oxford, where she gained a BA in 1925.

She married Patrick Herbert Lyon Playfair, FRCS, a gynaecologist and obstetrician, in London on 5 February 1935. He later remarried and had two children by his second wife, but was divorced by the time of his death.

Mavrogordato died on 28 June 1992 in Bungay, Suffolk.

== Works ==
Mavrogordato exhibited wood engravings and linocuts in several exhibitions in the 1930s. The 1939 "Exhibition of Modern Lino-cuts" at the City of Birmingham Museum and Art Gallery included eight of her works. Her prints have been described as "charming and vigorous" and featuring "the swirling movement that was one of the hallmarks of the pre-war British linocut." A sale at Bonhams in 2012 included a group of her paintings in a lot described as Mediterranean Houses Oil on board, 200 x 255mm (7 7/8 x 10in), together with three further oil paintings on canvas, In the Woods, 1273 x 760mm, a vase of flowers, Houses by a lake, 500 x 400mm, three watercolours Winter, signed lower right, 250 x 360mm, Village scene and portrait of a woman, one gouache on paper laid onto board Village with a church, 230 x 353mm, plus four pastels of a village, female portrait and two river scenes."

Her works are held in collections including

- British Museum (5 prints: Reynard the fox, Autumn morning, Hounds in bracken, Crossing the stream, Wild ponies)
- Christchurch Art Gallery Te Puna o Waiwhetū (2 prints: Gone to ground and Sailing)
- Museum of New Zealand Te Papa Tongarewa (5 prints: Evening, Norway, Calling hounds, Sailing, Autumn, Olympia)
- Aberdeen Art Gallery (4 prints: Orpheus, Autumn Morning, In the Cotswolds, In Covert)
- Brooklyn Museum (3 prints: North Wind, Olympia, The Piste)
- National Gallery of Australia (1 print: Black Swans)
- Victoria and Albert Museum (Parakeets, menu card for the Orient Line)
