= Li Hengde =

Chinese nuclear physicist and materials scientist (1921–2019)

Li Hengde 李恒德
- Born: 30 June 1921; Luoyang, Henan, China
- Died: 28 May 2019 (aged 97)
- Citizenship: Chinese
- Education: National Northwestern Engineering Institute; Carnegie Institute of Technology; University of Pennsylvania
- Scientific career
- Fields: Nuclear physics

Li Hengde (Chinese: 李恒德; 30 June 1921 – 28 May 2019) was a Chinese nuclear physicist and materials scientist who established China's first nuclear materials program at Tsinghua University. He was a founding academician of the Chinese Academy of Engineering, a Fellow of Biomaterials Science and Engineering (FBSE), and a Fellow of the Materials Research Society. He served as President of the Chinese Materials Research Society from 1991 to 1999 and as President of the International Union of Materials Research Societies (IUMRS) from 1999 to 2000.

== Early life ==
Li was born on 30 June 1921 in Luoyang, Henan, Republic of China. During the Second Sino-Japanese War, he studied mining and metallurgy at the temporary National Northwestern Engineering Institute. After graduating with a B.S. degree in 1942, he worked in a steel plant and an aircraft manufacturer for the remainder of the war.

== Studies and detention in the United States ==
After the end of World War II, Li went to the United States in 1946 to further his studies. He earned his master's degree from the Carnegie Institute of Technology in 1947 and worked at the University of Notre Dame for a year under Paul Beck. He subsequently entered the University of Pennsylvania, where he obtained his Ph.D. in 1953 under the supervision of R. M. Brick.

With the outbreak of the Korean War in 1950, the US and the newly established People's Republic of China became openly hostile. The US government forbade Chinese students in the country from going home and confiscated Li's passport. In 1952, he met with 14 other students in New Jersey and organized a secret network of students trying to return to China; they wrote several letters to Chinese Premier Zhou Enlai, which were delivered through various channels. When their detention was publicized by American newspapers in March 1954, the students appealed to President Dwight D. Eisenhower, the US Senate, the United Nations, and the American Civil Liberties Union for their right to return home.

Following protracted negotiations during and after the 1954 Geneva Conference, the US agreed to lift the restraining order on the Chinese students in exchange for the release of American prisoners in China. Li finally returned to China on the SS President Wilson in November, and the aerospace engineer Qian Xuesen was "deported" by the US in 1955. However, many of the students had established families and careers in the US in the intervening years, and decided to stay.

== Career in China ==
Back in China, Li was appointed an associate professor at Tsinghua University in Beijing, and later promoted to full professor. In 1956, he established China's first nuclear materials program at Tsinghua. He later served as Director of the Institute of Materials of Research of Tsinghua University from 1979 to 1987, and as Chair of the Department of Engineering Physics from 1982 to 1986.

Outside of Tsinghua University, he served as the inaugural Director of Materials and Engineering Sciences at the National Natural Science Foundation of China from 1986 to 1994. He was elected President of the Chinese Materials Research Society for two terms, serving from 1991 to 1999. He served as First Vice President of the International Union of Materials Research Societies (IUMRS) from 1997 to 1998 and as president from 1999 to 2000.

Li died on 28 May 2019 in Beijing, at the age of 97.

== Contributions and honours ==
Li's research areas included nuclear materials, material modification with ion beams, bioceramics and biomimetics. In the late 1940s, Li was one of the first scientists to work with beryllium and studied the plastic deformation of beryllium crystals. He also studied uranium dioxide and zirconium hydrides. After the Cultural Revolution, he began studying modification of metals with ion beams and published more than 100 papers in the field. His works were highly cited and he received the ISI Citation Classic Award in 2000.

In 1994, Li was elected a founding member of the Chinese Academy of Engineering. He was elected a Fellow of Biomaterials Science and Engineering (FBSE) in 2000 and a Fellow of the Materials Research Society in 2009.

Li was awarded the Ho Leung Ho Lee Prize for Science and Technology Achievement in 1998. In addition, he received more than ten national science prizes of China.
