= Cancer imaging =

Cancer imaging may refer to:

- Medical imaging in humans
- Preclinical imaging in animal models of research
- Cancer Imaging, an academic journal published by the International Cancer Imaging Society
