= Eureka Emefa Adomako =

Ghanaian botanist and academic

Eureka Emefa Ahadjie Adomako
- Education: St. Roses Secondary School; University of Ghana (BSc., MPhil); University of Cambridge (MPhil); University of Aberdeen (PhD)
- Occupations: Academic; Botanist
- Employer(s): University of Ghana, Legon
- Known for: Quiz Mistress for the National Science and Maths Quiz (2001–2005)

Eureka Emefa Ahadjie Adomako is a Ghanaian botanist and academic who is currently a senior lecturer at the Department of Plant and Environmental Biology, University of Ghana. Adomako served as the quiz mistress of the Ghana National Science and Maths Quiz (NSMQ) from 2001 to 2005.

== Early life and education ==
Eureka Adomako attended St. Rose's Secondary School. Adomako holds a bachelor of science degree in Botany from University of Ghana from 1993. She furthered her education at the University of Cambridge where she completed with a Master of Philosophy degree in Environment and Development in January, 1997. She returned to the University of Ghana to pursue a Master of Philosophy degree in Botany completing in December 1999.

In October 2005, she obtained a Commonwealth Academic Staff Scholarship to pursue a Ph.D in the United Kingdom at the University of Aberdeen. She completed in November 2008, with a Doctor of Philosophy degree in Plant Science.

Her thesis was Variations in Levels of Arsenic and Other Potentially Toxic Trace Elements in Ghanaian Soils and Grains: Human Health Implications for Mining-impacted Areas.

== Career ==
Between March 2000 and January 2002, Eureka Adomako was the Senior Program Coordinator at the nonprofit, Conservation International-Ghana office, where she worked on a campaign to curb the indiscriminate hunting and trade of endangered wildlife species. In 2003, Adomako was appointed a lecturer at the Department of Plant and Environmental Biology, University of Ghana. She rose to the rank of a senior lecturer in 2009. Upon her appointment as a lecturer, Adomako also took other roles starting as a fellow of Volta Hall in the University. She since then served in several roles including Sports Tutor from 2012 to 2014, President of the Senior Common Room from 2011 to 2014 and Senior Tutor from 2014 to 2018. As the senior tutor, she was a member of the Hall Council, a member of the hall's management board and Chairperson of the Tutorial Board. In January 2019, she was elevated and appointed as the 17th Warden of the Volta Hall during the hall's 60th anniversary celebration launch.

=== National Science and Maths Quiz ===
In 2001, Adomako succeeded Marian Ewurama Addy as the Quiz Mistress of the National Science and Maths Quiz after she had been recommended by the former herself. She presided over the quiz for 4 years from 2001 to 2005 and recommended Elsie Effah Kaufman, the current quiz mistress to take her place as she pursued her graduate studies at the University of Aberdeen.

== Awards, honours and fellowships ==
- ODA Cambridge-Commonwealth Scholarship, University of Cambridge (October 1995 - August 1996)
- Commonwealth Academic Staff Scholarship, University of Aberdeen (October 2005 – September 2008)
- Commonwealth Academic Fellowship for Post-Doctoral Studies, University of Aberdeen (October 2010 – April 2011)
- Honorary Research Fellow of the School of Biological Sciences, University of Aberdeen

== Personal life ==
Adomako is married with two children and she is a Christian.

== Published works ==
Adomako has worked on research works within the scope of botany, environmental science and plant and environmental biology.

- Variations in Levels of Arsenic and Other Potentially Toxic Trace Elements in Ghanaian Soils and Grains: Human Health Implications for Mining-impacted Areas, August 2008
- Enhanced transfer of arsenic to grain for Bangladesh grown rice compared to US and EU, September 2008
- Baseline soil variation is a major factor in arsenic accumulation in Bengal Delta paddy rice, January 2009
- Variations in Concentrations of Arsenic and Other Potentially Toxic Elements in Mine and Paddy Soils and Irrigation Waters from Southern Ghana, October 2010
- Inorganic arsenic and trace elements in Ghanaian grain staples, July 2011
- Impacts of Gold Mining on Rice Production in the Anum Valley of Ghana, July 2014
