= Hai-Quan Mao =

Chinese chemist and nanotechnologist

- Chinese: 毛海泉
Transcriptions
Standard Mandarin
- Hanyu Pinyin: Máo Hǎiquán
- Wade–Giles: Mao Hai-ch‘üan

Hai-Quan Mao is a Chinese chemist and nanotechnologist. He is a professor at Johns Hopkins University and associate director of the university's Institute for NanoBioTechnology. He is a fellow of the Royal Society of Chemistry and the American Institute for Medical and Biological Engineering and a member of the National Academy of Inventors.

== Biography ==
Mao earned a B.S. in chemistry in 1988 and a Ph.D. in polymer chemistry in 1993, both from Wuhan University in China. His doctoral advisor was Zhuo Renxi.

Mao taught as a lecturer in chemistry at Wuhan University from 1993 to 1995. From 1995 to 1998, he conducted postdoctoral research at Johns Hopkins University (JHU) in the United States. From 1999 to 2003, he was a co-principal investigator at the Johns Hopkins Singapore International Medical Center. From 2001 to 2003, he concurrently served as assistant professor in materials science at the National University of Singapore (NUS). He won the NUS's Young Investigator Award in 2002.

In 2003, Mao became a faculty member of Whiting School of Engineering at JHU. He is a professor at the university's Translational Tissue Engineering Center and the department of biomedical engineering at the Johns Hopkins School of Medicine. He was appointed associate director of JHU's Institute for NanoBioTechnology in 2016.

Mao's main research focus is nanotechnology for regenerative and therapeutic engineering. He has been awarded 23 patents in the United States.

Mao was elected a fellow of the Royal Society of Chemistry in 2014 and a member of the National Academy of Inventors in 2015. In 2018, he was elected a fellow of the American Institute for Medical and Biological Engineering (AIMBE) for engineering nanomaterials for regenerative medicine and drug delivery.
