= Caryn Agyeman Prempeh =

Ghanaian medical practitioner

- Born: Caryn Agyeman Prempeh
- Other name: Agyeman
- Citizenship: Ghana
- Education: St Rose's Senior High School; University College London; Headington Girls School; Kwame Nkrumah University of Science and Technology School of Medical Science
- Occupation: Physician
- Employer: Komfo Anokye Teaching Hospital 37 Military Hospital
- Known for: Medical practitioner Entrepreneur
- Father: Otumfuo Nana Osei Tutu II

Caryn Agyeman Prempeh is a Ghanaian medical practitioner and entrepreneur. She is the founder of CERVIVA Ghana Foundation.

== Education ==
Caryn is the daughter of Asantehene, Otumfuo Nana Osei Tutu II King of Asante. She was named after her paternal grandmother Nana Afia Kobi Serwah Ampem II, the Late Asantehemaa.

She had her secondary education at St Rose's Senior High School, Akwatia and Headington Girls School, Oxford, (United Kingdom). She furthered to University College Of London, Kwame Nkrumah University of Science and Technology School Of Medical Science and Queen Mary University of London to study Biomedical Science, Medicine and Global Public Health respectively.

== Career ==
Caryn started her medical practices in Komfo Anokye Teaching Hospital, Kumasi in 2015 then moved to 37 Military Hospital. She was a Resident Medical Officer Claron Health International Located at AirPort Residential Area in Accra - Ghana. Currently, Dr Caryn Agyeman Prempeh works at LEKMA Hospital, under the Ghana Health Service pursuing her interest in Public health ( Preventive Health).

In 2011, she founded Cerviva Ghana, a non profit that is creating awareness and educating young girls on prevention of cervical cancer. She is the team doctor of the Ghana Black Queens.
