= Accra Technical University =

Public technical university in Accra, Ghana

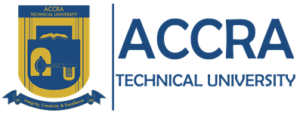

Location
- GP 561; Accra; Greater Accra Region; Accra, +233; Ghana
- Coordinates: 5.554028°N 0.205556°W

Information
- Type: Public Technical University
- Motto: Integrity, Creativity & Excellence
- Established: 1949; 77 years ago
- Status: Active
- School district: Accra Metropolitan District
- Category: Technical University
- Chairperson: Prof. Ernest Kofi Abotsi
- Campuses: Kinbu Campus & Mpehuasem Campus
- Campus type: Regular or Part-time
- Accreditation: Ghana Tertiary Education Commission, CTVET
- National ranking: 1
- Affiliations: Ghana Armed Forces School

The Accra Technical University (ATU) was established in 1949 as a Technical School in Ghana and commissioned in 1957 as Accra Technical Institute before being converted into a Polytechnic in 2007 by the Parliament of Ghana.

It was later given a university status, becoming Accra Technical University (ATU) in 2016. The school is located in Accra, the capital city of Ghana.

Accra Technical University focuses on technical and vocational education. The school offers a range of academic programs including applied sciences, engineering, business, arts, and design.

== History ==
=== Establishment ===
Accra Technical University was the first Technical University to be established. It was established in 1949 as a Technical School and commissioned in 1957 as Accra Technical Institute. In 1963, the institute was renamed Accra Polytechnic, by the orders of the then President, Dr. Kwame Nkrumah. By the Polytechnic Law of 1992 (PNDC 321), which became fully operative in the 1993/1994 academic year, Accra Technical University was elevated to a tertiary status. The institution was then placed under the Higher Education Council with autonomy to award Higher National Diplomas (through the National Board for Professional and Technician Examinations.

With the passage of the PNDC Law 321, the university upgraded its programmes and facilities in it to provide middle-level manpower to revolutionise and feed the growing Ghanaian industries. Notwithstanding the difficulties that characterized the sudden change over from secondary to a tertiary status, Accra Technical University made a tremendous progress in its review and expansion of curricula to suit contemporary needs. Accra Technical University began to offer Higher National Diploma (HND) programmes in Mechanical Engineering, Electrical/Electronic Engineering, Building Technology, Civil Engineering, Furniture Design and Production, Secretaryship and Management Studies, Bilingual Secretaryship and Management Studies, Accountancy, Marketing, Purchasing and Supply, Hotel Catering and Institutional Management, Fashion Design and Textiles, Mathematics and Statistics, and Science Laboratory Technology. The technician courses offered by the Polytechnic were maintained.

=== University status ===
In 2007 the Polytechnic Act (Act 745) was promulgated and it repealed PNDC Law 321 of 1992. This Act has granted the Polytechnics autonomy to award the Higher National Diplomas (HND), Diplomas and other Certificates accredited by the National Accreditation Board (NAB), and award Degrees subject to the conditions that the council of that Polytechnic may determine. Accra Technical University currently, offers ten (10) Degree (Btec) and fifteen (15) HND Programmes. These programmes are run in three schools. As a tertiary institution, Accra Technical University is governed by a Council established under the Technical University Act 2016 (Act 745).

== Campus ==
The campus is located at Barnes road, Accra

== Academics ==
The university has five faculties.

=== Faculty of Engineering ===
- Department of Mechanical Engineering
- Department of Electrical/Electronic Engineering
- Department of Civil Engineering

=== Faculty of Built Environment ===
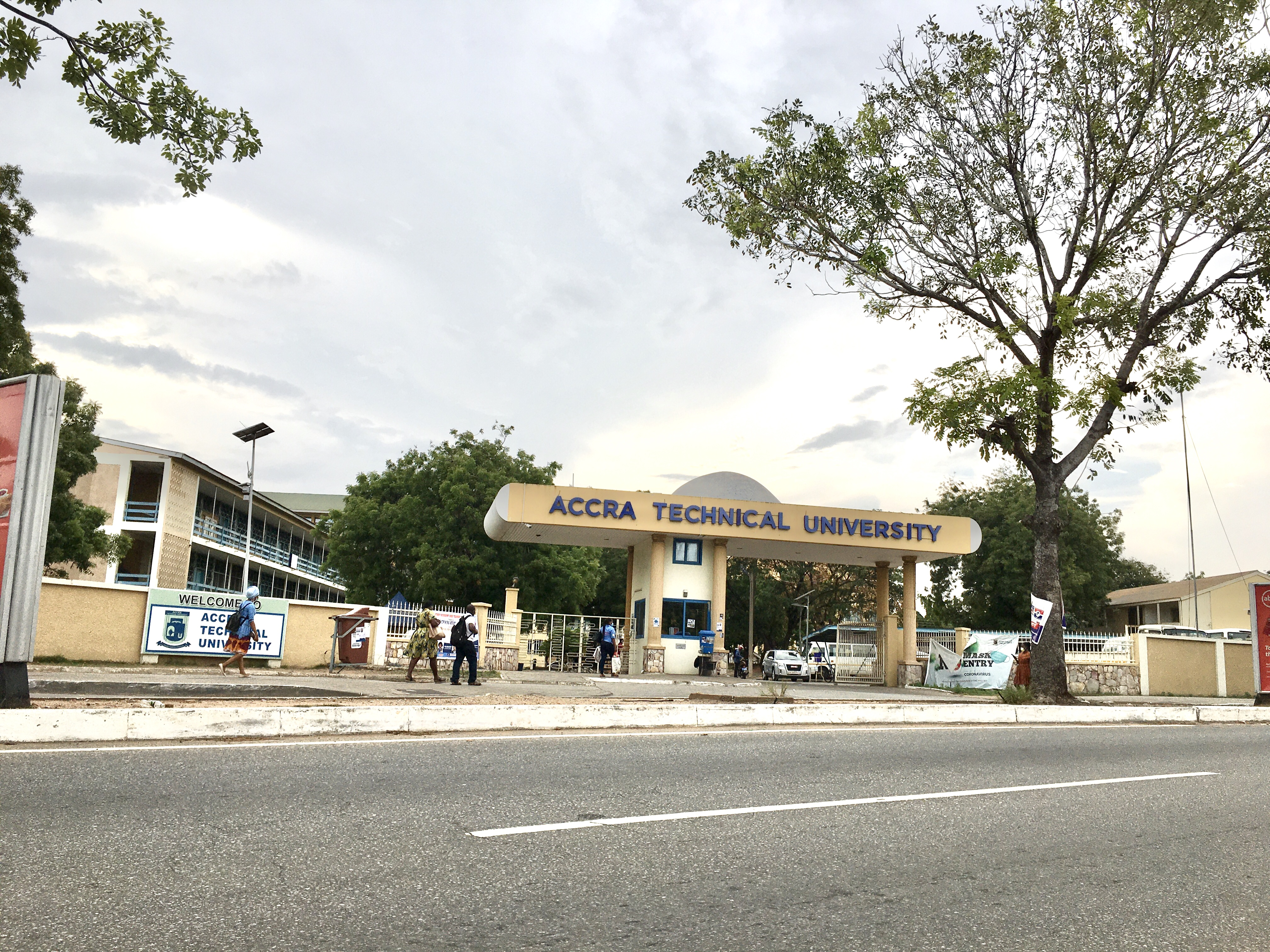
- Accra Technical University Ghana
  Department of Interior Design and Upholstery Technology
- Department of Building Technology

=== Faculty of Applied Sciences ===
- Applied Mathematics and Statistics
- Science Laboratory Technology
- Computer Science
- Medical Laboratory Technology

=== Faculty of Applied Arts ===
- Department of Hotel Catering & Institutional Management (HCIM)
- Fashion Design & Textile Department

=== Faculty of Business ===
- Accountancy and Finance
- Management and Public Administration
- Procurement and Supply Chain Management.
- Marketing

=== HND Programmes ===
With the upgrade in status, the technician courses previously offered by the school were maintained, and Higher National Diploma (HND) programmes in the following fields were added:

- Mechanical Engineering
- Electrical/Electronic Engineering
- Building Technology
- Civil Engineering
- Furniture Design and Production
- Secretaryship and Management Studies
- Bilingual Secretaryship and Management Studies
- Accountancy
- Marketing
- Purchasing and Supply
- Hotel Catering and Institutional Management
- Fashion Design and Textiles
- Mathematics and Statistics
- Science Laboratory Technology
- Medical Laboratory Science

== See also ==
- List of universities in Ghana
- Education in Ghana
