= Nana Anima Wiafe-Akenten =

Ghanaian linguist and media practitioner

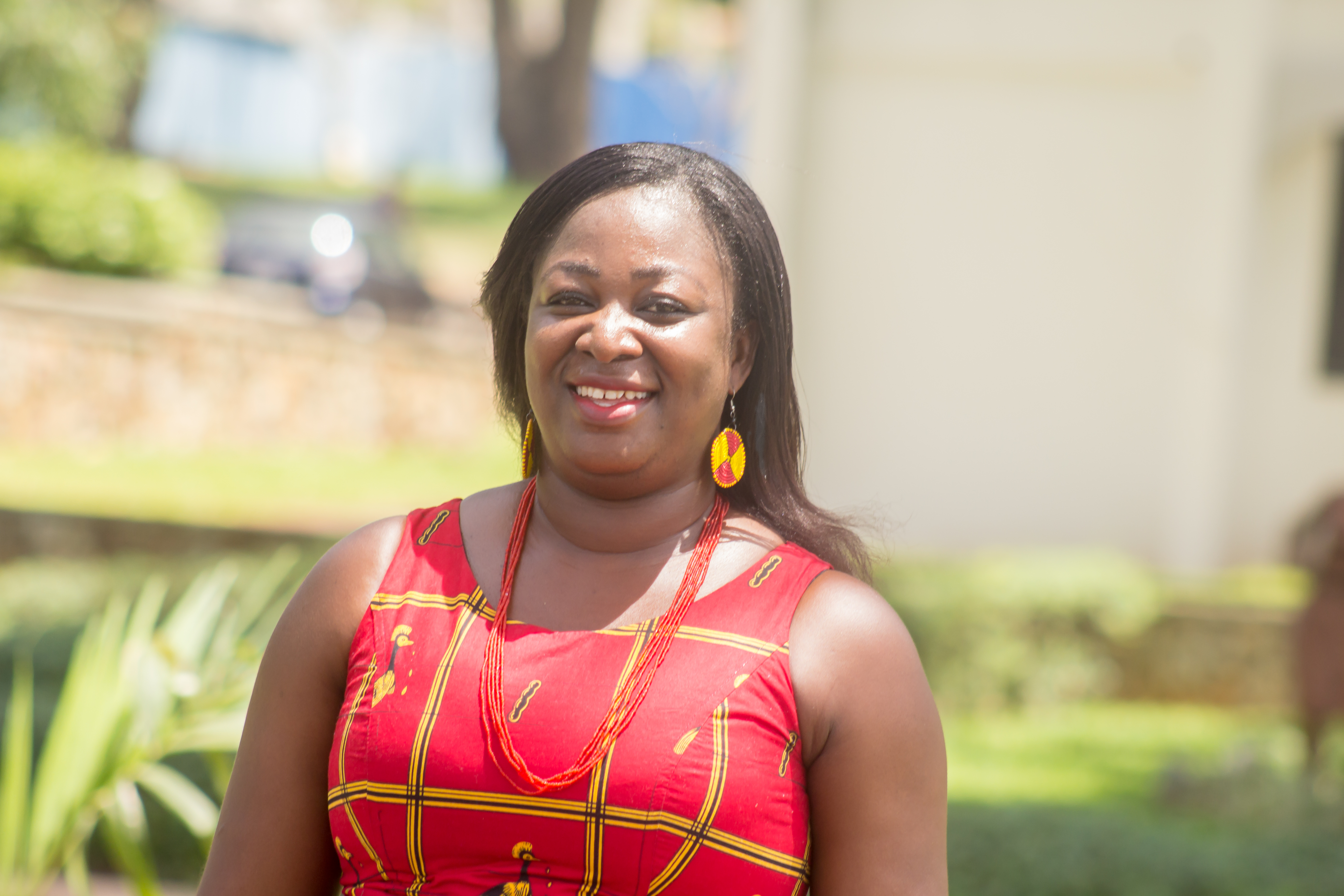
- Dr Nana Anima Wiafe Akenten in 2019
- Born: Atwima-Ofoase, Ashanti Region
- Occupation: Media personality

Nana Anima Wiafe-Akenten is a Ghanaian media practitioner and the Head of the Akan-Nzema Department of the College of Languages Education, Ajumako Campus of the University of Education, Winneba in Ghana. She is the first person to receive a doctorate degree in the Twi language, one of the varieties of Akan.

== Personal life ==
Wiafe-Akenten is from Atwima-Ofoase in the Ashanti Region. Dr. Anima grew up in a family of academicians. She is married to Dr. Charles B. Wiafe-Akenten, who is also a lecturer at the Psychology Department of the University of Ghana. Her first child, Dr Michael Wiafe-Kwagyan, is a lecturer with the Plant Science Department in the same institution. She has three daughters - Nana Adwoa, Awo Asantewaa, and Ohenemaa Wiafewaa.

== Education ==
Wiafe-Akenten had her secondary education at the St. Roses Secondary School, Akwatia in the Eastern Region of Ghana between 1991 and 1993. She attended University of Ghana for her first degree, graduating with a Bachelor of Arts in Linguistics and Theatre Arts (Theatre for Extension Communication) in 1995. She received the Doctorate Degree from the University of Ghana in July, 2017 in Ghanaian Language Studies (Akan Linguistics - Media Discourse). Notably, she wrote her dissertation on Modern usage of Akan on radio and TV (Sɛ dea wɔde akan kasa dzi dwuma enɛ mbre yi wɔ radio ne TV so) in the Twi language, the first person to do so. According to her, the main challenge of writing an academic paper in Twi was correctly translating quotations and terminology of scientific writing from English.

== Media work ==
She worked at the television station GTV, from 2003 to 2013. She also hosted a programme called Amammerefie on local radio station, Asempa FM between 2008 and 2010. Additionally, she worked as the head of Akan news at Top Radio and Radio Universe all based in Accra.

== Social work ==
Wiafe-Akenten established the Language Watch Foundation to help curb the use of vulgar language on the airwaves. She is in process of establishing the Nananom Language and Media Centre to train people in writing skills in Twi, choice of words, public speaking, the use of Twi proverbs and taboo words.
