= Dorset House, Oxfordshire =

Large house in Oxford, England

Coordinates: 51.758°N 1.216°W

Dorset House was a large house in Headington, Oxford, in Oxfordshire, England.

This villa, known in its later years as Dorset House, was built in 1878 on the south side of London Road, Oxford. It had several names during its lifetime:

- 1878–1899: Ellerslie
- 1899–1920: Hillstow
- 1920–1961: Hillstow Annexe, Headington School
- 1961–2004: Dorset House, School of Occupational Therapy (named after Dorset House, Bristol, where the School of Occupational Therapy had been originally established)

Catherine Caughey (1923–2008), who worked on codebreaking at Bletchley Park during World War II, subsequently trained as an occupational therapist at Dorset House.

The house was acquired by Quintain property developers in 2006 and demolished in 2009. Quintain sold the site to Berkeley Homes in September 2010 for £5m. The site was developed as student housing for Oxford Brookes University students during 2011–12. and is managed by Unite, still under the name of Dorset House.
