= Catherine Caughey =

New Zealand codebreaker (1923–2008)

Catherine Mary Caughey MBE (née Harvey, 8 December 1923 – 12 April 2008) used Colossus computers for codebreaking at Bletchley Park during World War II.

== Early life ==
Catherine Mary Harvey was born in Eldoret, Kenya, on 8 December 1923, and spent her early life on an isolated farm there. She was educated in England, at St Mary's School, Calne in Wiltshire, and Harcombe House Domestic Science School, in Dorset.

== World War II service ==
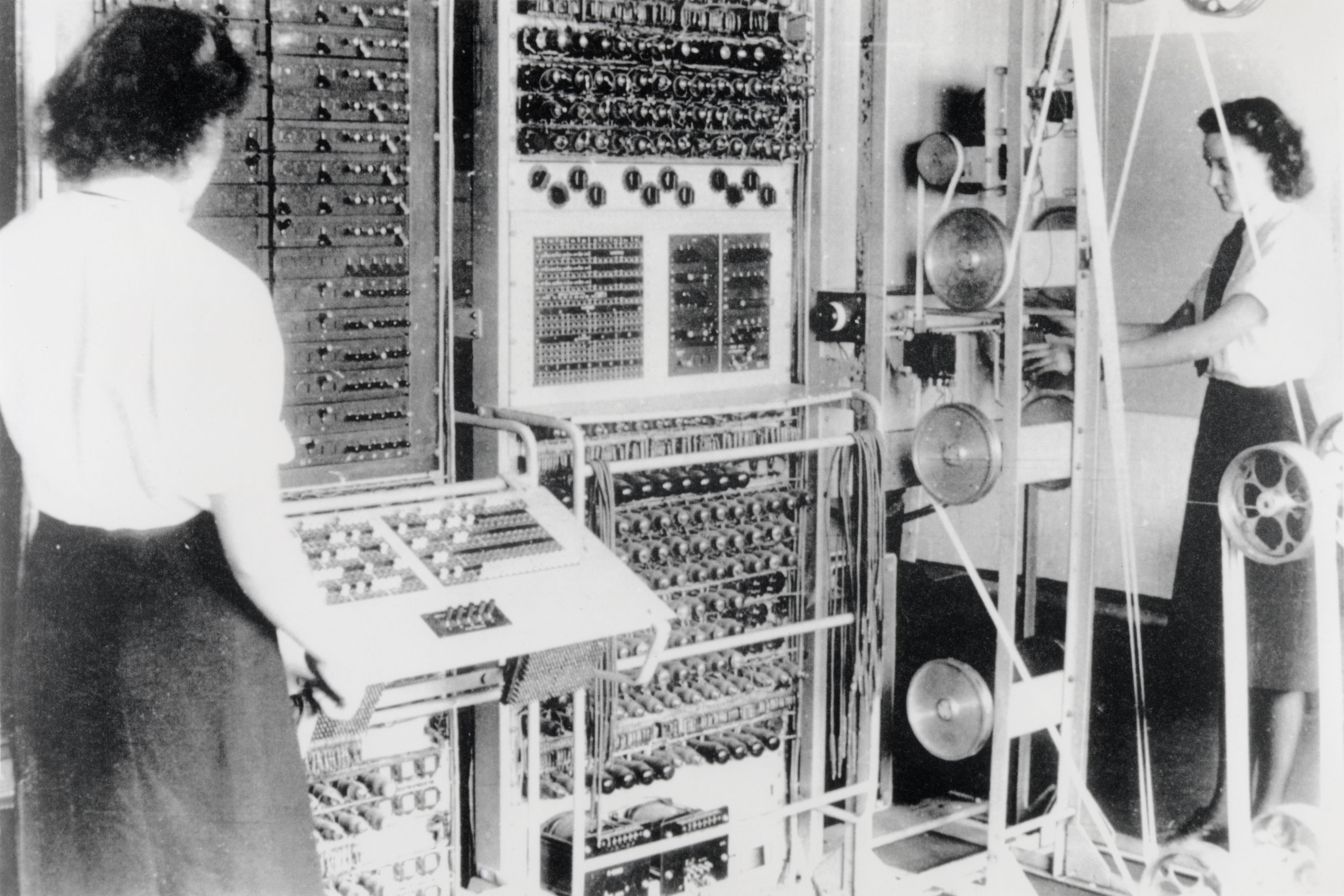
The Colossus computer, as operated by Catherine Caughey at Bletchley Park during World War II

Harvey was called up for war service in 1943. After thorough interviewing and testing, she was chosen to work as a "Wren" in the Women's Royal Naval Service (WRNS), allocated to "Special Duties X" at Bletchley Park. Here from early 1944, she worked in the "Newmanry" (named after Max Newman) using the Colossus computers for deciphering German High Command messages. Later she was responsible for the teleprinter room in the Newmanry, where Tunny (Lorenz cipher) messages were received from the main intercept station located in Kent.

== Post-war life ==
After the war, Harvey attended Dorset House in Oxford, trained as an occupational therapist. Once qualified, she worked at a psychiatric hospital in Oxford.

In 1950, she married Ron Caughey in Oxford. Ron Caughey was awarded a fellowship to work at a children’s hospital in Philadelphia, United States. The couple then moved to Auckland, New Zealand, in 1952, living first in Epsom and later in Remuera. They had a son and a daughter. In 1975, Catherine Caughey became a naturalised New Zealand citizen.

Ron Caughey died in 1975 before secrecy around wartime work at Bletchley Park was lifted in the same year, 30 years after the end of World War II, followed by the declassification of the 1945 General Report on Tunny in 2000.

Caughey was active in the Girl Guides in New Zealand, serving on the national council and executive, and in 1976 she was appointed honorary vice president for the Auckland province. In 1978, she founded the Auckland Multicultural Society, and served as its president. In the 1994 New Year Honours, Caughey was appointed a Member of the Order of the British Empire, for services to the community.

In 1994, Caughey published the autobiographical book World Wanderer in the form of her diaries, which was approved by the British Ministry of Defence. She also contributed to a chapter on bombes in The Turing Guide on Alan Turing that appeared posthumously in 2017. She died in Auckland on 12 April 2008, and her body was cremated at Purewa Crematorium.

== Publications ==
- Caughey, Catherine M. (1994). World Wanderer. Auckland: Catherine Caughey. (autobiography)
