= Elsie Effah Kaufmann =

Ghanaian academic and biomedical engineer

Elsie Effah Kaufmann FGA, FBSE, FGhIE, FREng, PE
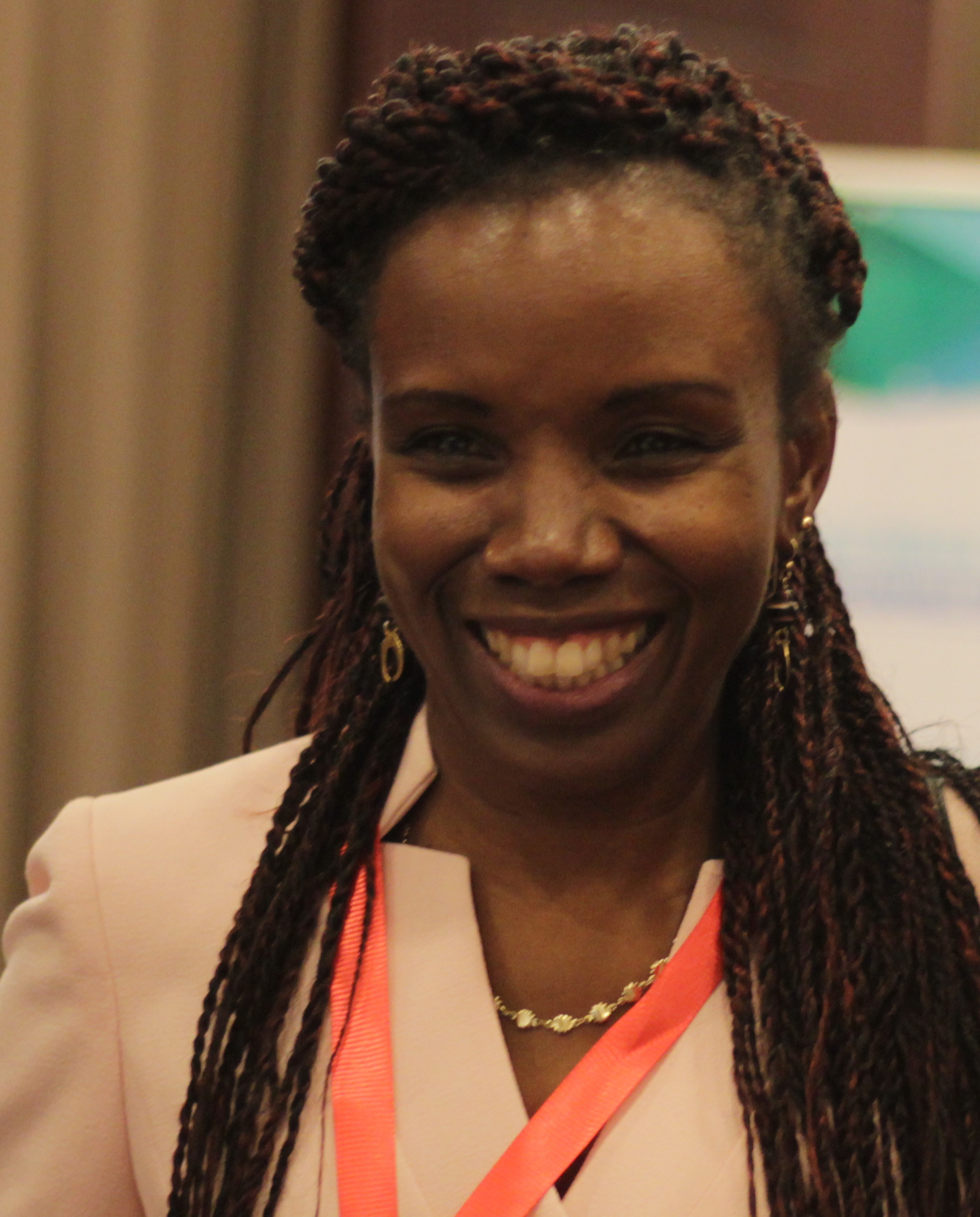
- Effah Kaufmann in 2021
- Born: 7 September 1969 (age 56); Accra, Ghana
- Education: Aburi Girls' Senior High School; UWC Atlantic; University of Pennsylvania (BSE, MSE, PhD)
- Occupations: Academic administrator; Biomedical Engineer; Television host
- Employer(s): University of Ghana, Legon
- Known for: Dean of the School of Engineering Sciences; Quiz Mistress for the National Science and Maths Quiz (2006–present)
- Awards: Fellow of the Royal Academy of Engineering (2025)

Elsie Akosua Biraa Effah Kaufmann FGA, FBSE, FGhIE, FREng, PE (born 7 September 1969) is a Ghanaian academic, academic administrator, biomedical engineer, and television host. She is the Dean of the School of Engineering Sciences at the University of Ghana since August 2022, the first woman to hold the position. Effah Kaufmann is renowned for her contributions to biomedical engineering education and research in Africa, and is the current host of the National Science and Maths Quiz since 2006.

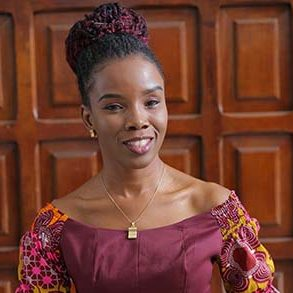
Prof. Elsie Effah Kaufmann

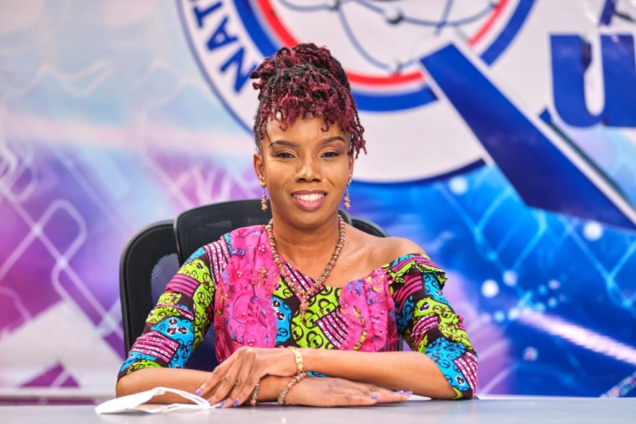
Prof. Elsie Effah Kaufmann on stage as Quiz Mistress of the National Science and Maths Quiz, 2022

A University of Pennsylvania-trained bioengineer, Effah Kaufmann's work focuses on tissue engineering, biomaterials, and STEM education accessibility in resource-limited settings. In 2025, she was inducted as the first Ghanaian International Fellow of the Royal Academy of Engineering.

== Early life and education ==
Effah Kaufmann was born on 7 September 1969 in Accra, Ghana. She hails from Assin in the Central Region, which is her hometown. Her father, Yusuf K. Effah, served as the headmaster of T.I. Ahmadiyya Senior High School, Kumasi and later as Director of Education in the Western Region.

She proceeded to the University of Pennsylvania for her Bachelor of Science in Engineering (BSE) in Bioengineering (graduated cum laude in 1992), a Master of Science in Engineering (MSE) in Bioengineering (1993), and a doctorate (PhD) in Bioengineering (1998).

== Career ==
Prof. Effah Kaufmann was a research supervisor at the Department of Chemistry at Rutgers University in New Jersey, United States from May 1998 to June 2001. She previously served as a Teaching Assistant at the Department of Bioengineering at the University of Pennsylvania.

Effah Kaufmann joined the University of Ghana in 2001 as a lecturer in the Department of Physics. She played a key role in establishing the Faculty of Engineering Sciences, serving on the committee for its creation (2001–2003). In July 2006, she became the Founding Head of the Department of Biomedical Engineering, a position she held until 2012 and again from 2014 to 2016. She was promoted to associate professor in December 2020.

From 2021 to 2022, Effah Kaufmann held leadership roles at the University of Health and Allied Sciences (UHAS), including Founding Head of the Department of Orthotics and Prosthetics.

Since 1 August 2022, she has been Dean of the School of Engineering Sciences at the University of Ghana, the first woman to hold the position.

She is the current host of the National Science and Maths Quiz.

== Elsie Effah Kaufmann Foundation ==
On 27 July 2022, in Accra, Effah Kaufmann established the Elsie Effah Kaufmann Foundation (EEKF), a non-profit organization focused on advancing STEM education in Ghana. The foundation aims to close gaps in STEM education by providing students with access to resources for in-depth, hands-on research and innovation.

== Awards and recognition ==
Effah Kaufmann has received numerous prestigious local and international awards and recognitions for her contributions to engineering, education, and STEM advocacy.

=== Major honors and fellowships ===
- Fellow, Royal Academy of Engineering, UK (2025) – Inducted on 18 November 2025 as the first Ghanaian International Fellow, one of nine International Fellows elected worldwide in 2025.
- Fellow, Ghana Academy of Arts and Sciences (2022) – Elected in June 2022.
- Fellow, International Union of Societies of Biomaterials Science and Engineering (2020) – Conferred the title Fellow of Biomaterials Science and Engineering (FBSE).
- National Society of Black Engineers Golden Torch Award for International Academic Leadership (2018) – First female recipient.
- University of Ghana Best Teacher Award for the Sciences (2009).

=== Other selected awards and recognitions ===
- 2025: Women's Choice Awards Africa – Her Legacy Honours in STEM Empowerment.
- 2024: Honoured on the Penn Engineering Wall of Fame, University of Pennsylvania (first African female).
- 2023: Ghana Institution of Engineering Excellence Award for Research (Academic-Industrial) and Award for Distinguished Woman in Engineering Excellence.
- 2022: EMY Africa Woman of the Year.
- 2022: Humanitarian Awards Global – Female Most Exceptional Change Maker (Education).
- 2021: Women's Choice Awards – STEM Personality of the Year.
- 2021: Instinct Women Awards – Exceptional Woman in Academia.
- 2021: Ghana Digital Innovation Week – Innovation Ecosystem Game Changer for the Advancement of STEM.
- 2020: Feminine Ghana Achievement Award for Education (General).
- 2020: Featured as an Inspirational Person in the *Those Who Inspire Ghana* Book.
- 2019: Ghana Women of Excellence Award for Tertiary Education (Science and Mathematics).
- 2019: Glitz Africa Honouree for Excellence in Education.
- 2019: Featured in *Who's Who in Ghana* Publication.
- 2018: Leading Women Achievers Award, Global Women Economic & Social Empowerment Summit (GWESES).
- 2017: Impact Africa Summit Ghana Laureate for Education.
- 2011: International Women's Forum Leadership Foundation Fellowship.

=== Professional certifications ===
Effah Kaufmann is a Professional Engineer (PE) and Fellow of the Ghana Institution of Engineers (FGhIE), and holds a PMP Certification from the Institute of Project Management Professionals – Ghana.

== Personal life ==
Effah Kaufmann is divorced and has three children: two daughters and a son, Augustus Kofi Effah Kaufmann.
