= Sandra Opoku =

Ghanaian lawyer

Sandra Opoku is a Ghanaian lawyer. In 2019, Nana Addo Dankwa Akufo-Addo appointed her the first female director of the Tema Port. She was formerly the general manager for the legal division of the Ghana Ports and Harbours Authority.

== Education ==
Opoku attended St Roses Senior High school in Akwatia, Eastern Region, where she acquired both her O level in 1992 and A Levels in 1994. Back in school, she was the protocol officer and a dining hall prefect. Upon completing her schooling at St. Roses, she gained admission into the University of Ghana to pursue a degree in Law and subsequently entered the Ghana School of Law, and there, she was called to the Bar in October 2001. In 2004, she again gained admission into the International Maritime Law Institute in Malta, where she obtained her Masters in International Maritime Law.

== Career ==
Opoku first joined the Ghana Ports and Harbours Authority in 2003. Since then she has worked there serving as a lawyer, general manager in charge of Administration, general manager in charge of legal and board secretary of the Ghana Ports and Harbours Authority. She took over from Edward Kofi Osei and is currently the acting director of the Tema Ports. Her appointment into office, which was done by Nana Addo Dankwa Akufo-Addo took place in March 2019.

== Personal life ==
Opoku is a Presbyterian. She is married with three children.
