= Headington Rye Oxford =

Girls' school in Oxford, England

Coordinates: 51°45′27″N 1°13′17.4″W

Headington School Oxford
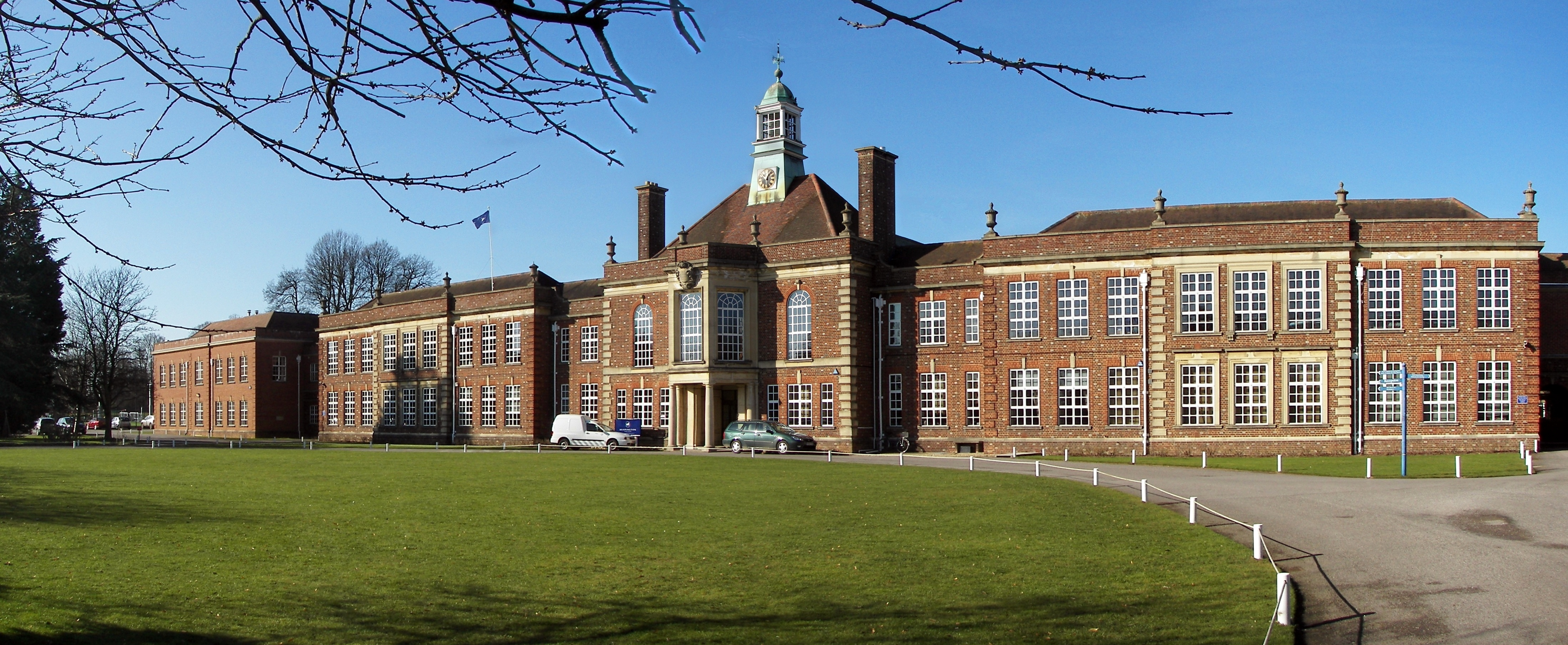

Location
- Headington Road; Oxford, OX3 0BL; England

Information
- Type: Private day and boarding school
- Motto: Αγωνίζου τον καλόν αγώνα της πίστεως (1 Timothy: 6:12. English: Fight the good fight of Faith)
- Religious affiliation: Church of England
- Established: 1915
- Local authority: Oxfordshire
- Headmistress: Caroline Jordan
- Gender: Girls
- Age: 3 to 18
- Enrolment: 1020~
- Houses: Davenport House Hillstowe House Napier House McGregor House Celia Marsh House
- Colour
- Song: Fight the Good Fight
- Former pupils: Headingtonians
- Boat Club: Headington School Oxford Boat Club
- Website: www.headington.org

Headington School Oxford is an independent day co-educational prep school for girls and boys aged 3–11 and a day and boarding school for girls aged 11–18, in Headington, Oxford, England.

Headington Rye Oxford was formed in 2024, when Headington School, founded in 1915, merged with the neighbouring Rye St Antony School, founded in 1930. The School officially changed its name to Headington School Oxford in 2026.

== History ==
Headington School was founded in 1915 by a group of evangelical Christians to provide "a sound education for girls to fit them for the demands and opportunities likely to arise after the war". It started at Headington Lodge on Osler Road with ten boarding and eight day girls. As the school expanded after the war, more buildings were bought and added to the school.

In 1920, Davenport House, one of the current boarding houses, (on the corner of London Road and Pullens Lane) was taken over by the school. The house had a 2-acre (0.81 ha) garden and another 19 acres (7.7 ha) of farmland attached stretching as far east as the White Horse pub. The main school then moved to its current building, built in the neo-Georgian style, in 1930. In 1942 it was registered as an educational charity.

== Headington Prep School ==
The preparatory school is located on a separate site on Pullens Lane. It used to be called a junior school, but changed to the prep in 2004. The premises which house the prep school were originally known as Rye St Antony. Its pupils uses some facilities of the senior school, such as the swimming pool, playing field, all-weather surface and theatre.

Both the prep and senior schools share the same governing body. It is a member of the Independent Association of Preparatory Schools.

== Facilities ==
The school embarked on a series of building projects during the early 2000s, beginning with the Art Department, the professional-standard Theatre at Headington (2002), Napier Boarding House (2003), a large Dining Hall (2005), the Music School (2008-9), the Diamond Jubilee building (nicknamed Diamond by students and staff, 2011-2012), the Sports Centre (2015), the Library extension (2016), sixth form centre redesign (2016-2019) and most recently, the Hive (2021). These complement the original neo-Georgian senior school building constructed in the 1930s.

There are 23 acres of grounds and playing fields, tennis courts, swimming pool and a floodlit Astroturf pitch. The school also owns the Headington School Oxford Boat Club.

== Boarding ==
Headington offers both full-time, part-time or flex-boarding to girls aged 11 and above. Approximately one third of its pupils are boarders. They are grouped by years and reside in four boarding houses.

- Davenport: U3 (Year 7) to U4 (Year 9)
- Hillstow: U4 to U5 (Year 11)
- Napier: L5 (Year 10) to U5 (Year 11)
- Celia Marsh: L6 & U6 (Sixth Form)
- MacGregor: L6 & U6 – attached to Celia Marsh House

== Curriculum ==
Headington is one of the higher achieving independent schools in Oxfordshire.

The International Baccalaureate was offered alongside A Levels from September 2009. Headington School ceased to offer the International Baccalaureate from September 2020.

== Extra-curricular activities ==
Headington offers over 50 different extracurricular activities ranging from sport to the Duke of Edinburgh Award. Headington's Combined Cadet Force is one of only four all girls contingents in the country.

Sports teams and athletes regularly take part in competitions at county or national level.

The rowing team (Headington School Oxford Boat Club) is one of the county's most successful school teams. It won the girls eights category at the National Schools Regatta in 2001 and completed the rare "Women's triple" in 2009, 2014, 2015, and 2016 by winning the National Schools, Schools Head and Henley. It has also performed well in the South of England Indoor Rowing Championships, winning five overall classes in 2008 and finishing runners-up in 2010. Two of its members were chosen to represent Great Britain at the 2010 Summer Youth Olympics in Singapore and claimed a gold medal in the girls' pair category.

In 2013 seven Headington girls won their category in the Oxford Music Festival and the sixth form vocal ensemble The Eleven received the top choral prize.

== Notable former pupils ==
- Freya Allan, actress (The Witcher, Gunpowder Milkshake)
- Samantha Butler, Professor of Neurobiology
- Lily van den Broecke, Great Britain Rowing Paralympian: Gold London 2012
- Angela Gallop, British forensic scientist
- Fiona Gammond, Great Britain Rowing Olympian
- Frances Gardner, cardiologist
- Katie Greves, Olympic Silver Medallist, European Champion and Triple Olympian in rowing
- Alice Hart-Davis, journalist
- Elizabeth Curzon, Countess Howe, Lord Lieutenant of Buckinghamshire
- Janet Husband, Emeritus Professor of Radiology
- Khadija Bukar Abba Ibrahim, Member of the Nigerian House of Representatives
- Lady Elizabeth Longford, biographer
- Elinor Lyon, children's author
- Ann Mallalieu, Baroness Mallalieu, barrister, politician, and president of the Countryside Alliance
- Ghislaine Maxwell, former socialite and convicted sex offender
- Ann Katharine Mitchell, 1922 - 2020, British codebreaker and social scientist
- Christina Onassis, shipping magnate
- Caryn Agyeman Prempeh, medical practitioner and television personality
- Julia Somerville, former BBC News and ITV News presenter
- Lady Henrietta Spencer-Churchill, daughter of the 11th Duke of Marlborough
- Sophie Sumner, model
- Jane Tewson, founder of Comic Relief
- Emma Watson, actress
- Barbara Woodhouse, TV personality and dog trainer
- Oluyinka Idowu, 1992 Olympic Games & 1994 Commonwealth Silver Medalist.
- Janet Young, Baroness Young, former Leader of the House of Lords

== See also ==
- Hillstow Annexe, later Dorset House
