= University Practice Senior High School =

Location
- Cape Coast; Ghana
- Coordinates: 5.1245°N 1.2860°W

Information
- Motto: Service To The Community
- Established: 1976; 50 years ago
- School district: Cape Coast Metropolitan Assembly
- Category: B
- Headmaster: Charles Agyapong Boamah
- Houses: Six Houses namely Ackah, Densu, Tano, Nkrumah, Pra, Volta
- Student Union/Association: UPOSA
- Nickname: UNIPRA

University Practice Senior High School (UPSHS) is a second-cycle institution within the University of Cape Coast vicinity in the Central Region of Ghana.
