= St. Francis Xavier Minor Seminary =

Catholic high school and minor seminary in Ghana

St. Francis Xavier Minor Seminary is an all-boys' Catholic secondary boarding school and minor seminary in Wa, Ghana.
