= Ghana Institution of Engineers =

Engineering society in Ghana

Ghana Institution of Engineering(GhIE)
- Founded: 1968; 58 years ago
- Type: Engineering society
- Headquarters: 13 Continental Road, Roman Ridge, Accra, Ghana
- President: Ing. Kwabena Bempong, FGhIE
- Website: www.ghie.org.gh

The Ghana Institution of Engineering (GhIE) is professional bodies responsible for licensing practicing engineers in Ghana. It was founded in 1968 to succeed the Ghana Group of Professional Engineers. The Institution derives its authority from the Engineering Council Act 2011, Act 819 and the Professional Bodies Registration Decree NRCD143 of 1973. It regulates the activities of engineers and engineering firms in Ghana. It also sets standards in engineering sector of Ghana and organises professional exams for engineers.

== Mission ==
As part of its mission, the GhIE aims to:

- Be leaders in the development of science, engineering and technology at all levels of society.
- Share knowledge and instill in the membership professionalism and ethical practice
- Establish structures to ensure good corporate image of the institution at all times.

== Membership ==
Membership categories include Fellows, Members, Associates, Graduate Members, Affiliates and Technicians.
