= Chartered Institute of Marketing Ghana =

Organization in Accra, Ghana

The Chartered Institute of Marketing, Ghana (CIMG) is the professional umbrella body for marketers in Ghana. It was established in July 1981 as the Institute of Marketing, Ghana, before its name was officially changed to the Chartered Institute of Marketing, Ghana in 1992. The institute's mission is “to lead in the development of world-class marketing professionals and practitioners for effective marketing practice in Ghana.”

== Legal Mandate and Regulation ==
The institute's status was formalised by the Chartered Institute of Marketing, Ghana Act, 2020 (Act 1021), which was assented to by the President of Ghana on August 13, 2020. This Act established the CIMG as a body corporate with the legal authority to regulate and set professional standards for marketing practice within the country. The Act also gives the CIMG the power to provide training, conduct examinations, and award professional certificates.

== National Marketing Performance Awards ==
The CIMG organises the annual National Marketing Performance Awards to recognise marketing excellence in Ghana. The awards' overarching purpose is to promote high professional standards and foster healthy competition among organisations in Ghana. The themes for the awards are selected each year to reflect current economic and social trends, with the goal of inspiring companies to develop strategies that contribute to national progress. The 36th Annual National Marketing Performance Awards were held in September 2025, at the Labadi Beach Hotel in Accra.

The awards recognise achievements across six competitive categories:

- Hall of Fame
- Personality
- Media and Marketing Communications
- Business organisations
- Products
- Not-for-Profit organisations

Additionally, a non-competitive CIMG President’s Special Awards is presented to individuals, businesses, or products that have positively contributed to national development.
