= International Cancer Imaging Society =

The International Cancer Imaging Society (ICIS) is a London-based organisation for medical imaging.

== History ==
It was founded in 1998.

== Structure ==
It is headquartered in London.

== Function ==
It produces the journal Cancer Imaging, published since the year 2000. It conducts teaching courses, and holds an annual conference (annual meeting).

=== Annual meetings ===
2016 annual meeting was held in Glasgow. 2017 annual meeting was held in Berlin. 2018 annual meeting was held in Menton. 2019 annual meeting was held in Verona. 2020 annual meeting will be held in London.

== See also ==
- Positron emission tomography
- Positron emission tomography–magnetic resonance imaging
- Royal College of Radiologists
