= National Board for Professional and Technician Examinations =

The National Board for Professional and Technician Examinations of Ghana is an academic accreditation body. The board has oversight of non-university tertiary institutions, professional bodies and private institutions with accreditation by the National Accreditation Board. It is responsible for the formulation and administration of schemes of examinations, evaluation, assessment, certification and standards for skill competence and syllabus competence.

== Operations ==
The Board is headquartered in Accra.
