= Fellow of Biomaterials Science and Engineering =

In April 1992, the constituent biomaterials societies of the World Biomaterials Congress, now the International Union of Societies for Biomaterials Science and Engineering (IUSBSE) experienced the need to recognize all their members who had a status of excellent professional standing and high achievements in the field of biomaterials science and engineering. This was the beginning of the establishment of the honorary status of "Fellow, Biomaterials Science and Engineering" (FBSE).

== Fellowship – What it means in letter and spirit ==
Distinguished members who had gained accomplishment and were acknowledged as role models in the field of biomaterials science and engineering are given the Fellow status. Such Fellows are expected, through word and deed, to foster the field of biomaterials and to support its professional development as a practical and intellectual endeavour.

New Fellows are announced and recognised at every World Biomaterials Congress (held once every four years). Fellows are confirmed on an international level by IUS-BSE. Approved candidates are installed on an international level at a World Congress. The duly nominated, approved, confirmed, and installed fellow has the right to carry the letters FBSE. These letters indicate the international recognition and respect of his/her comprehension of professional issues and accomplishments as a scientist or engineer in the field of biomaterials science and engineering. The fellow status is awarded for life. A Fellow has all rights and obligations of an active member of their Society.

== The Rights and Obligations of Fellowship ==
It is expected that Fellows shall recognise individual achievements and contributions to the practice of BSE, foster professional interactions of BSE practitioners among each other, and with medical practitioners, patients, regulatory and legislative offices, and the public, promote public awareness of the profession of BSE, and promote and encourage professional and continuing education in BSE. In general, these processes are based on the following guidelines.

- Candidates for Fellow status are to be nominated and evaluated by existing Fellows
- Candidates should normally have at least ten years of scientific or professional contributions to the field of biomaterials science and engineering, with at least ten years of continuous active (full) membership upon nomination, or alternatively, be founding membership in the Society.
- Candidates should have appropriate professional training, competence, and good standing in a discipline appropriate for biomaterials science and engineering research. Exceptions can be approved with sufficient justification.
- Candidates should have significant contributions to the field of Biomaterials Science and Engineering documented by a continuous productivity in biomaterials research, development, education, or administration. The documents shall evidence an increasing leadership role.
- Candidates should have a continuing record of publication in refereed journals appropriate to the candidate's contributions to the field.

== See also ==
- Biomaterial
- European Society for Biomaterials
