= Germany in the Eurovision Song Contest 2019 =

- Eurovision Song Contest 2019
- Participating broadcaster: ARD (Note: Arbeitsgemeinschaft der öffentlich-rechtlichen Rundfunkanstalten der Bundesrepublik Deutschland) – Norddeutscher Rundfunk (NDR)
- Country: Germany
- Selection process: Unser Lied für Israel
- Selection date: 22 February 2019

Competing entry
- Song: "Sister"
- Artist: Sisters
- Songwriters: Laurell Barker; Marine Kaltenbacher; Tom Oehler; Thomas Stengaard

Placement
- Final result: 25th, 24 points

Participation chronology

Germany was represented at the Eurovision Song Contest 2019 with the song "Sister" written by Laurell Barker, Marine Kaltenbacher, Tom Oehler and Thomas Stengaard, and performed by the duo Sisters (stylised as S!sters), consisting of Laurita Kästel and Carlotta Truman. The German entry for the 2019 contest in Tel Aviv, Israel was selected through the national final Unser Lied für Israel, organised by the German broadcaster ARD in collaboration with Norddeutscher Rundfunk (NDR). The national final took place on 22 February 2019 and featured seven competing acts with the winner selected by the votes of a 100-member Eurovision panel, a 20-member international jury panel and a public televote. "Sister" performed by Sisters was selected as the German entry for Tel Aviv after gaining the most points following the combination of votes.

As a member of the "Big Five", Germany automatically qualified to compete in the final of the Eurovision Song Contest. Performing in position 4, Germany placed twenty-fifth out of the 26 participating countries with 24 points.

== Background ==
Prior to the 2019 contest, Germany had participated in the Eurovision Song Contest sixty-two times since its debut as one of seven countries to take part in 1956. Germany has won the contest on two occasions: in 1982 with the song "Ein bißchen Frieden" performed by Nicole and in 2010 with the song "Satellite" performed by Lena. Germany, to this point, has been noted for having competed in the contest more than any other country; they have competed in every contest since the first edition in 1956 except for the 1996 contest when the nation was eliminated in a pre-contest elimination round. In 2018, the German entry "You Let Me Walk Alone" performed by Michael Schulte placed fourth of twenty-six competing songs scoring 340 points.

The German national broadcaster, ARD, broadcasts the event within Germany and delegated the selection of the nation's entry to the regional broadcaster Norddeutscher Rundfunk (NDR). NDR confirmed that Germany would participate in the 2019 Eurovision Song Contest on 19 May 2018. Since 2013, NDR had set up national finals with several artists to choose both the song and performer to compete at Eurovision for Germany. Along with their participation confirmation, the broadcaster announced that they would organise a multi-artist national final to select the German entry.

== Before Eurovision ==
=== Unser Lied für Israel ===
Unser Lied für Israel (English: Our Song for Israel) was the competition that selected Germany's entry for the Eurovision Song Contest 2019. The competition took place on 22 February 2019 at the Studio Berlin Adlershof in Berlin, hosted by Linda Zervakis and Barbara Schöneberger. Like in the previous year, the national final was co-produced by the production companies Kimmig Entertainment and Lodge of Levity. Seven acts competed during the show with the winner being selected through a combination of votes from a 100-member Eurovision panel, a 20-member international jury panel and a public televote. The show was broadcast on Das Erste, One and Deutsche Welle as well as online via the broadcaster's official website live.daserste.de and Eurovision Song Contest website eurovision.de. Peter Urban provided commentary during the show with interpretation in German Sign Language also being provided for the online broadcast on eurovision.de. The national final was watched by 2.99 million viewers in Germany with a market share of 9.6%.

==== Competing entries ====
Interested performers were able to apply by submitting an online application between 21 June 2018 and 31 July 2018. Additional artists were also invited by NDR and proposed by composers, producers and record companies. By the end of the process, it was announced that 965 applications were received and 198 performers were longlisted by a panel consisting of Christoph Pellander (head of German delegation for Eurovision), Thomas Niedermeyer (Digame general manager), Werner Klötsch (Digame managing director) and representatives of NDR.

50 artists were further longlisted by a Eurovision panel consisting of 100 German television viewers put together according to selected criteria in cooperation with Simon-Kucher and Digame through surveys on social media in order to reflect the taste of the wider European audience, while an international jury panel consisting of 20 members who had been national juries for their respective countries at the Eurovision Song Contest shortlisted 15 artists to go through a workshop, held at the Maarwegstudio 2 in Cologne between 28 September and 2 October 2018, where they received vocal coaching and choreography training. 90-second videos showcasing each artist during the workshop were recorded and presented to both groups that ultimately selected the six competing artists. The six participating acts were announced on 8 November 2018. Between 5 and 9 November 2018, the six artists worked with 24 German and international composers and lyricists in a songwriting camp in order to create their candidate songs for the national final. The participating songs were announced on 8 January 2019 alongside the announcement of S!sters as the seventh participating act after NDR received additional proposals from composers, producers and artists themselves.

Shortlisted acts
- Aly Ryan
- Barna
- BB Thomaz
- Daniel Schuhmacher
- Diana Schneider
- Dimi Rompos
- Gregor Hägele
- Kasalla
- Lilly Among Clouds
- Linus Bruhn
- Makeda
- Nicole Cross
- Nina Kutschera
- ~~Sebastian Schub (withdrew)~~
- S!sters
- Thilo Berndt

Artist	Song	Songwriter(s)
Aly Ryan	"Wear Your Love"	Aly Ryan, Michelle Leonard, Thomas Stengaard, Tamara Olorga
BB Thomaz	"Demons"	BB Thomaz, Andrew Tyler, Ricardo Bettiol, Tim Schou
Gregor Hägele	"Let Me Go"	Gregor Hägele, Jonas Shandel, David Jürgens, Tamara Olorga
Lilly Among Clouds	"Surprise"	Elisabeth Brüchner, Udo Rinklin
Linus Bruhn	"Our City"	Linus Bruhn, Dave Roth, Pat Benzner, Serhat Sakin, Simon Reichardt, Gianna Roth
Makeda	"The Day I Loved You Most"	Makeda, Tim Uhlenbrock, Kelvin Jones, Kristine Bogan
S!sters	"Sister"	Laurell Barker, Marine Kaltenbacher, Tom Oehler, Thomas Stengaard

==== Final ====
The televised final took place on 22 February 2019. The winner, "Sister" performed by S!sters, was selected through a combination of votes from a 100-member Eurovision panel (1/3), a 20-member international jury panel (1/3) and public televoting which included options for landline and SMS voting (1/3). In addition to the performances of the competing entries, 2010 German Eurovision Song Contest winner Lena performed her song "Thank You", 2018 German Eurovision entrant Michael Schulte performed his new song "Back to the Start", German singer Udo Lindenberg performed his song "Radio Song" together with singer Andreas Bourani, and German band Revolverheld performed their song "So wie jetzt". A total of 374,313 televotes were cast during the show: 255,837 votes through landline and 118,476 votes through SMS.

Final – 22 February 2019
R/O	Artist	Song	Eurovision Panel		Jury		Televote		Total	Place
R/O	Artist	Song	Votes	Points	Votes	Points	Votes	Points	Total	Place
1	Gregor Hägele	"Let Me Go"	592	5	100	4	26,053	5	14	6
2	Aly Ryan	"Wear Your Love"	991	12	125	6	39,503	7	25	4
3	Makeda	"The Day I Loved You Most"	840	10	186	10	39,480	6	26	2
4	BB Thomaz	"Demons"	566	4	117	5	20,697	4	13	7
5	Lilly Among Clouds	"Surprise"	789	8	158	7	83,677	10	25	3
6	Linus Bruhn	"Our City"	782	7	167	8	71,490	8	23	5
7	S!sters	"Sister"	640	6	187	12	93,413	12	30	1

Detailed International Jury Votes
R/O	Song	Florent Luyckx	Ruth Lorenzo	Mark De-Lisser	Nicolò Cerioni	Ludmila Kuts	Einar Bardarson	Argyro Christodoulides	Deivydas Zvonkus	Adrienn Zsédenyi	Jick Nakassian	Margaret Berger	Janis Sidovský	Sasha Saedi	Tinkara Kovač	Filip Adamo	Anca Lupes	Bruno Berberes	Aija Puurtinen	Grzegorz Urban	Johannes Strate	Total
R/O	Song	NLD	ESP	GBR	ITA	BLR	ISL	CYP	LTU	HUN	GRC	NOR	CZE	AUT	SVN	SWE	ROU	FRA	FIN	POL	DEU	Total
1	"Let Me Go"	4	4	4	7	4	7	6	5	4	6	6	7	4	4	6	5	5	4	4	4	100
2	"Wear Your Love"	7	8	8	6	7	4	5	4	5	7	8	6	8	5	8	4	4	10	5	6	125
3	"The Day I Loved You Most"	8	10	12	10	10	12	12	7	6	12	12	10	10	8	7	12	6	7	8	7	186
4	"Demons"	5	5	5	4	6	5	4	6	7	10	4	5	6	10	4	8	7	5	6	5	117
5	"Surprise"	6	6	6	12	12	6	8	8	10	4	5	4	7	12	12	7	10	8	7	8	158
6	"Our City"	12	12	7	8	8	10	10	12	8	8	7	8	5	7	5	6	8	6	10	10	167
7	"Sister"	10	7	10	5	5	8	7	10	12	5	10	12	12	6	10	10	12	12	12	12	187

=== Promotion ===
S!sters made several appearances across Europe to specifically promote "Sister" as the German Eurovision entry. On 6 April, Sisters performed during the Eurovision in Concert event which was held at the AFAS Live venue in Amsterdam, Netherlands and hosted by Edsilia Rombley and Marlayne. They also performed at the Eurovision Pre-Party Madrid event, which was held on 21 April at the Sala La Riviera venue in Madrid, Spain and hosted by Tony Aguilar and Julia Varela.

== At Eurovision ==
According to Eurovision rules, all nations with the exceptions of the host country and the "Big Five" (France, Germany, Italy, Spain and the United Kingdom) are required to compete in one of two semi-finals, and qualify in order to participate in the final; the top ten countries from each semi-final progress to the final. As a member of the "Big Five", Germany automatically qualified to compete in the final on 18 May 2019. In addition to their participation in the final, Germany is also required to broadcast and vote in one of the two semi-finals. During the semi-final allocation draw on 28 January 2019, Germany was assigned to broadcast and vote in the second semi-final on 16 May 2019.

In Germany, the two semi-finals and the final were broadcast on One. ARD also broadcast the final on Das Erste and Deutsche Welle. All broadcasts featured commentary by Peter Urban. The final was watched by 8.1 million viewers in Germany, which meant a market share of 34.3 per cent. The German spokesperson, who announced the top 12-point score awarded by the German jury during the final, was Barbara Schöneberger.

=== Final ===
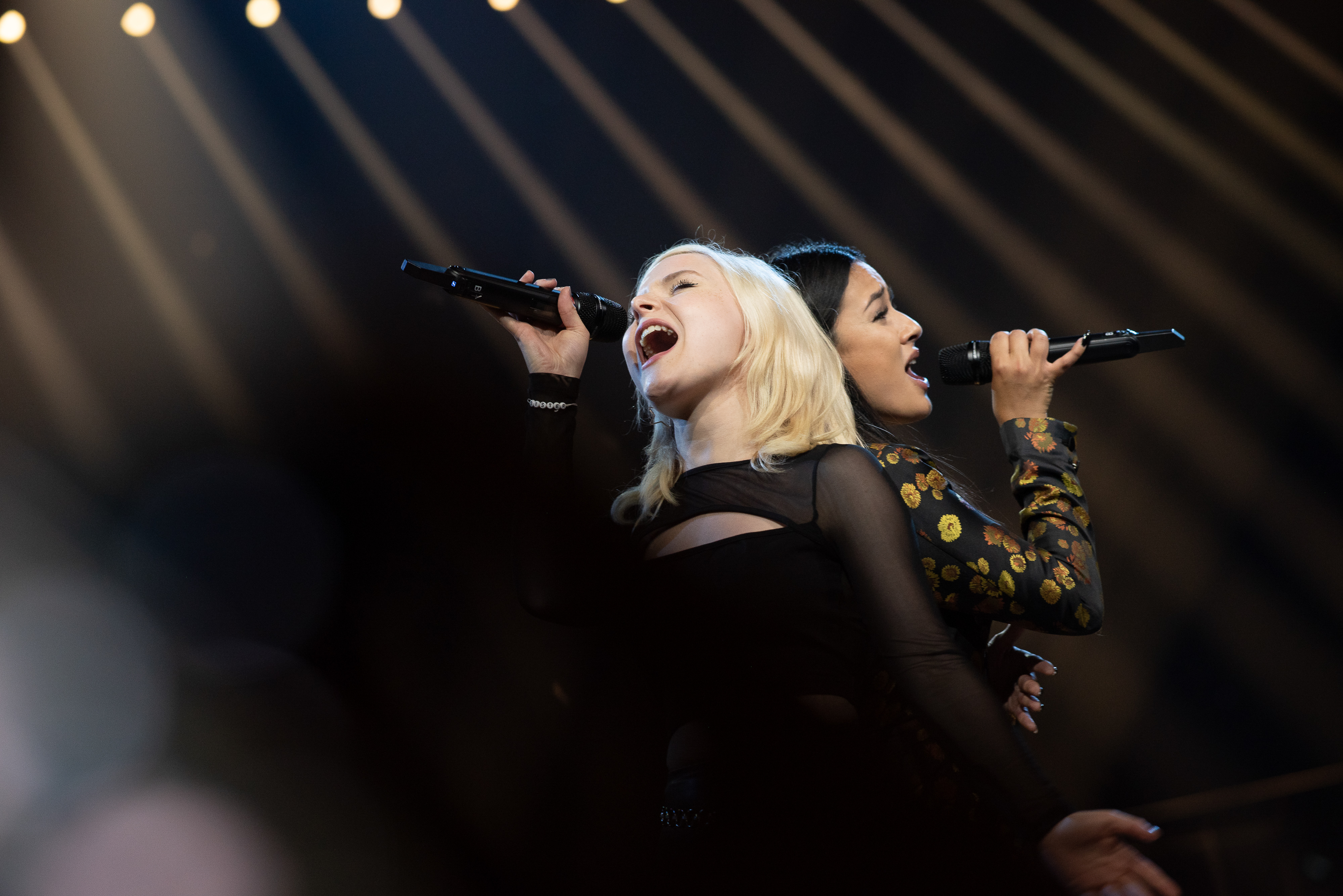
S!sters during a rehearsal before the final

S!sters took part in technical rehearsals on 10 and 12 May, foll owed by dress rehearsals on 15, 17 and 18 May. This included the semi-final jury show on 15 May where an extended clip of the German performance was filmed for broadcast during the live show on 16 May and the jury final on 17 May where the professional juries of each country watched and voted on the competing entries. After technical rehearsals were held on 12 May, the "Big Five" countries and host country Israel held a press conference. As part of this press conference, the artists took part in a draw to determine which half of the grand final they would subsequently participate in. Germany was drawn to compete in the first half. Following the conclusion of the second semi-final, the shows' producers decided upon the running order of the final. The running order for the semi-finals and final was decided by the shows' producers rather than through another draw, so that similar songs were not placed next to each other. Germany was subsequently placed to perform in position 4, following the entry from the Czech Republic and before the entry from Russia.

The German performance was designed by Florian Wieder and featured the members of S!sters performing on stage; Carlotta Truman was in a leather black outfit, while Laurita Kästel was in a gold and black flower-patterned mini dress. The staging presentation included Truman standing at the left of the stage and Kästel sitting at the right of the stage at the beginning. As the song progressed, a pyrotechnic waterfall was displayed and both members walked towards the front of the stage to meet each other. The LED screens displayed clips of the duo singing with their faces multiplied as well as words such as "sorry" and "respect" in big letters for the first chorus, and a group of women in various types of relationships as well as a peace symbol for the second chorus. S!sters were joined by four off-stage backing vocalists: Inga Lühning, Ray Lozano, Sonja Wiegand and Verena Heinz. Germany placed twenty-fifth in the final, scoring 24 points: 0 points from the televoting and 24 point from the juries.

=== Voting ===
Voting during the three shows involved each country awarding two sets of points from 1-8, 10 and 12: one from their professional jury and the other from televoting. Each nation's jury consisted of five music industry professionals who are citizens of the country they represent, with their names published before the contest to ensure transparency. This jury judged each entry based on: vocal capacity; the stage performance; the song's composition and originality; and the overall impression by the act. In addition, no member of a national jury was permitted to be related in any way to any of the competing acts in such a way that they cannot vote impartially and independently. The individual rankings of each jury member, as well as the nation's televoting results, were released shortly after the grand final.

Below is a breakdown of points awarded to Germany and awarded by Germany in the second semi-final and grand final of the contest, and the breakdown of the jury voting and televoting conducted during the two shows:

==== Points awarded to Germany ====
Points awarded to Germany (Final)
Score	Televote	Jury
12 points		
10 points		
8 points		Denmark
7 points		
6 points		Switzerland
5 points		Lithuania
4 points		
3 points		Australia
2 points		Ireland
1 point		

==== Points awarded by Germany ====
Points awarded by Germany (Semi-final 2)
Score	Televote	Jury
12 points	Switzerland	North Macedonia
10 points	Norway	Netherlands
8 points	Netherlands	Switzerland
7 points	Russia	Sweden
6 points	North Macedonia	Malta
5 points	Sweden	Denmark
4 points	Azerbaijan	Romania
3 points	Croatia	Azerbaijan
2 points	Albania	Norway
1 point	Lithuania	Austria

Points awarded by Germany (Final)
Score	Televote	Jury
12 points	Norway	Italy
10 points	Switzerland	Australia
8 points	Russia	Netherlands
7 points	Netherlands	North Macedonia
6 points	Italy	Switzerland
5 points	Australia	Norway
4 points	Denmark	France
3 points	Slovenia	Malta
2 points	Iceland	Sweden
1 point	Sweden	Denmark

==== Detailed voting results ====
The following members comprised the German jury:

- Michael Schulte (jury chairperson) – singer, songwriter, represented Germany in the 2018 contest
- Annett Louisan – singer, songwriter
- Nico Santos – singer, songwriter, composer
- Nicola Rost – singer, songwriter, artist
- Joe Chialo – manager, label founder

Detailed voting results from Germany (Semi-final 2)
R/O	Country	Jury							Televote	
R/O	Country	M. Schulte	A. Louisan	N. Santos	N. Rost	J. Chialo	Rank	Points	Rank	Points
01	Armenia	8	15	11	12	15	12		12	
02	Ireland	15	14	8	14	17	14		17	
03	Moldova	17	13	10	18	11	15		18	
04	Switzerland	1	4	5	4	3	3	8	1	12
05	Latvia	12	16	12	11	12	13		16	
06	Romania	13	2	6	8	9	7	4	14	
07	Denmark	10	5	7	7	2	6	5	11	
08	Sweden	3	10	2	6	5	4	7	6	5
09	Austria	5	8	14	9	18	10	1	13	
10	Croatia	16	12	13	16	14	17		8	3
11	Malta	4	7	3	5	7	5	6	15	
12	Lithuania	18	18	18	15	16	18		10	1
13	Russia	9	11	15	13	10	11		4	7
14	Albania	14	17	17	10	13	16		9	2
15	Norway	7	6	9	17	6	9	2	2	10
16	Netherlands	2	3	4	2	4	2	10	3	8
17	North Macedonia	6	1	1	1	1	1	12	5	6
18	Azerbaijan	11	9	16	3	8	8	3	7	4

Detailed voting results from Germany (Final)
R/O	Country	Jury							Televote	
R/O	Country	M. Schulte	A. Louisan	N. Santos	N. Rost	J. Chialo	Rank	Points	Rank	Points
01	Malta	8	8	6	13	7	8	3	24	
02	Albania	19	22	21	6	14	14		16	
03	Czech Republic	12	20	16	16	13	16		18	
04	Germany									
05	Russia	18	19	19	8	8	13		3	8
06	Denmark	11	15	9	11	10	10	1	7	4
07	San Marino	25	24	24	25	15	24		25	
08	North Macedonia	5	3	7	1	5	4	7	15	
09	Sweden	9	14	4	12	11	9	2	10	1
10	Slovenia	14	10	17	19	23	17		8	3
11	Cyprus	15	11	14	22	16	15		21	
12	Netherlands	3	4	5	4	3	3	8	4	7
13	Greece	21	12	18	20	25	22		19	
14	Israel	23	23	23	18	21	25		20	
15	Norway	7	5	11	10	4	6	5	1	12
16	United Kingdom	24	16	15	17	18	21		22	
17	Iceland	20	13	20	15	17	19		9	2
18	Estonia	22	21	22	14	24	23		14	
19	Belarus	16	7	8	21	19	11		23	
20	Azerbaijan	10	18	25	9	9	12		13	
21	France	6	9	12	3	12	7	4	11	
22	Italy	1	1	1	2	2	1	12	5	6
23	Serbia	17	17	10	23	20	18		17	
24	Switzerland	2	6	2	7	6	5	6	2	10
25	Australia	4	2	3	5	1	2	10	6	5
26	Spain	13	25	13	24	22	20		12	
