= Independence Arch =

Landmark in Accra, Ghana

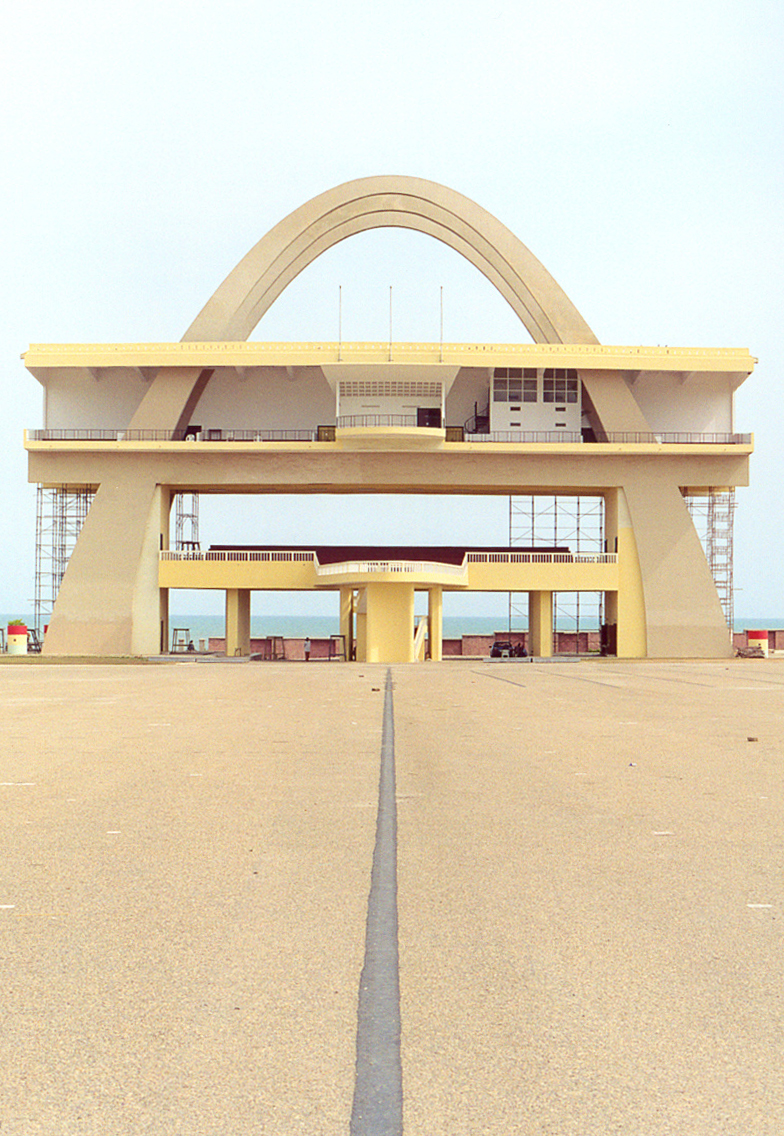
- The Independence Arch at Black Star Square, Accra
- Interactive map of Independence Arch
- Location: Black Star Square, Accra, Ghana
- Coordinates: 5.5465°N 0.1924°W
- Designer: Ghana Public Works Department
- Type: Triumphal arch
- Material: Concrete and stone
- Completion date: 1961
- Inauguration date: 6 March 1961
- Dedicated to: Ghana’s independence from the United Kingdom in 1957

The Independence Arch is a national monument located at Black Star Square (also known as Independence Square) in Accra, the capital of Ghana. It forms part of a complex of monuments commemorating the country's independence from British colonial rule in 1957. The Arch, alongside the Black Star Gate and the Liberation Day Monument forms part of the greater independence square.

== History ==
Construction of the Independence Arch was commissioned by Kwame Nkrumah, Ghana’s first Prime Minister and President, as part of a broader effort to establish national symbols following the country’s independence on 6 March 1957.

The Arch and its surrounding structures were completed in 1961 in time for the state visit of Queen Elizabeth II to Ghana by Ghanaian contractors and G.N.C.C which formed part of Solel Boneh International Ltd. The square was designed to host national parades, independence anniversaries, and other state ceremonies.

== Design and symbolism ==
The Independence Arch is a triumphal arch constructed primarily from concrete and stone. It stands on a raised platform with stairways on either side, symbolizing ascension and progress. It encapsulates a modern Eastern European Architecture spacious enough to seat about 3000 people. The structure is marked by Ghana’s national emblem, the Black Star of Africa.

== Access and photography ==
The arch holds two separate structures with the lower chamber mostly reserved for dignitaries and head of states who grace occasions at the square. The upper tier however includes office spaces.

As of 2011, visitors to the Independence Arch may not approach the monument closely without authorization, due to an active military presence in the area. Photography of the Arch itself is often restricted, although tourists are free to take pictures of the surrounding Independence Square and the Black Star Gate.
