= Global Citizen Festival =

Annual music festival

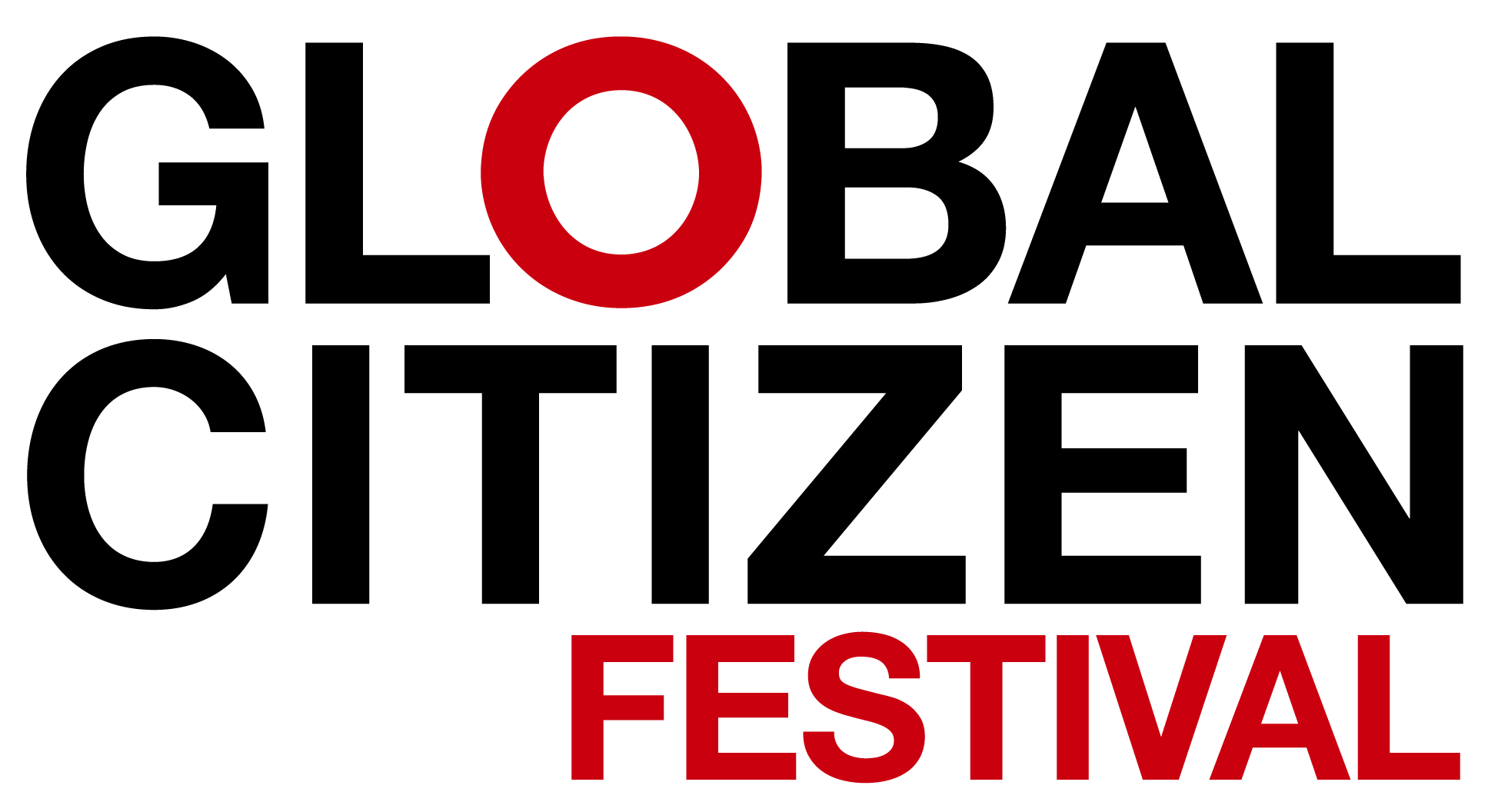
- Locations: Central Park (Manhattan, New York City, United States); MMRDA Grounds (BKC, Mumbai, India); Barclaycard Arena (Hamburg, Germany); FNB Stadium (Johannesburg, South Africa)
- Coordinates: 40°47′N 73°58′W (United States); 19°4′N 72°52′E (India)
- Years active: 14
- Founders: Ryan Gall, Hugh Evans
- Attendance: ~60,000 (New York City)
- Organizer: Global Citizen
- Website: globalcitizen.org

The Global Citizen Festival is an annual music festival held in Central Park, started in 2012 and organized by Global Citizen. The festival was founded by Ryan Gall and Hugh Evans. Gall said he was inspired by visiting Austin City Limits and seeing the branding on the stage, but wanting to replace the corporate branding with branding from charities. Since 2015, Coldplay lead vocalist Chris Martin has served as the festival's curator.

== Background ==
The Global Citizen Festival is part of a movement to end extreme poverty. By contributing to charity acts on the website, including watching videos and signing petitions, fans can get free tickets to the festival. In addition, the organizers are striving to make the event "global" by live-streaming events in public locations. Since 2015, the goals of the festival have been closely aligned with the United Nations' Sustainable Development Goals (SDGs), which include 17 tasks to end extreme global poverty by 2030.

According to Time, Global Citizen's model of ticket distribution in 2017 generated 1.6 million actions in two months, equaling commitments and announcements of $3.2 billion for sustainable development and affecting 221 million people.

== History ==
=== 2012 ===
Co-founder Ryan Gall created the Global Citizen Festival when he met festival co-founder Hugh Evans at Columbia University at a conference and proposed the idea of holding a festival on the Great Lawn of Central Park. The pair later approached concert promoter Goldenvoice to launch the festival in 2012.

Gall says the inspiration for the festival came from visiting Austin City Limits and seeing the branding on each stage but wanting to replace the corporate branding with branding from charities. Tickets to the festival are distributed through a lottery system with festival-goers performing actions on Global Citizen's website. The festival has taken its model to Australia, India, the United Kingdom, Germany, Belgium and Canada and is one of the largest, most visible events drawing attention to sustainability and anti-poverty efforts for young people around the world.

The Global Citizen Music Festival was first held in New York City on September 29, 2012. The headliners included the Foo Fighters, The Black Keys, John Legend, Band of Horses, K'naan, and Neil Young & Crazy Horse.

=== 2013 ===
In its second year, the festival was held on September 28, 2013. The headliners included Stevie Wonder, Kings of Leon, Alicia Keys, and John Mayer. The event's major themes for the year were education, women's equality, global health, and global partnerships. The event was produced by Anschutz Entertainment Group and Diversified Production Services, with Ticketmaster serving as the event's ticketing partner.

=== 2014 ===
In 2014, the festival was held on September 27. The line-up included Alicia Keys playing a special piece of music for the show along with Palestinian and Jewish artists. Tiësto opened, followed by Fun, The Roots, Carrie Underwood, No Doubt – joined by Sting for a song, and Jay Z – whose set featured two duets with Beyoncé. The event was hosted by Hugh Jackman, alongside presenters Dianna Agron, Zachary Quinto and Erin Heatherton. Speakers at the event included Queen Silvia of Sweden, Prime Minister of India Narendra Modi, Prime Minister of Norway Erna Solberg and US President Barack Obama via a pre-recorded video.

=== 2015 ===
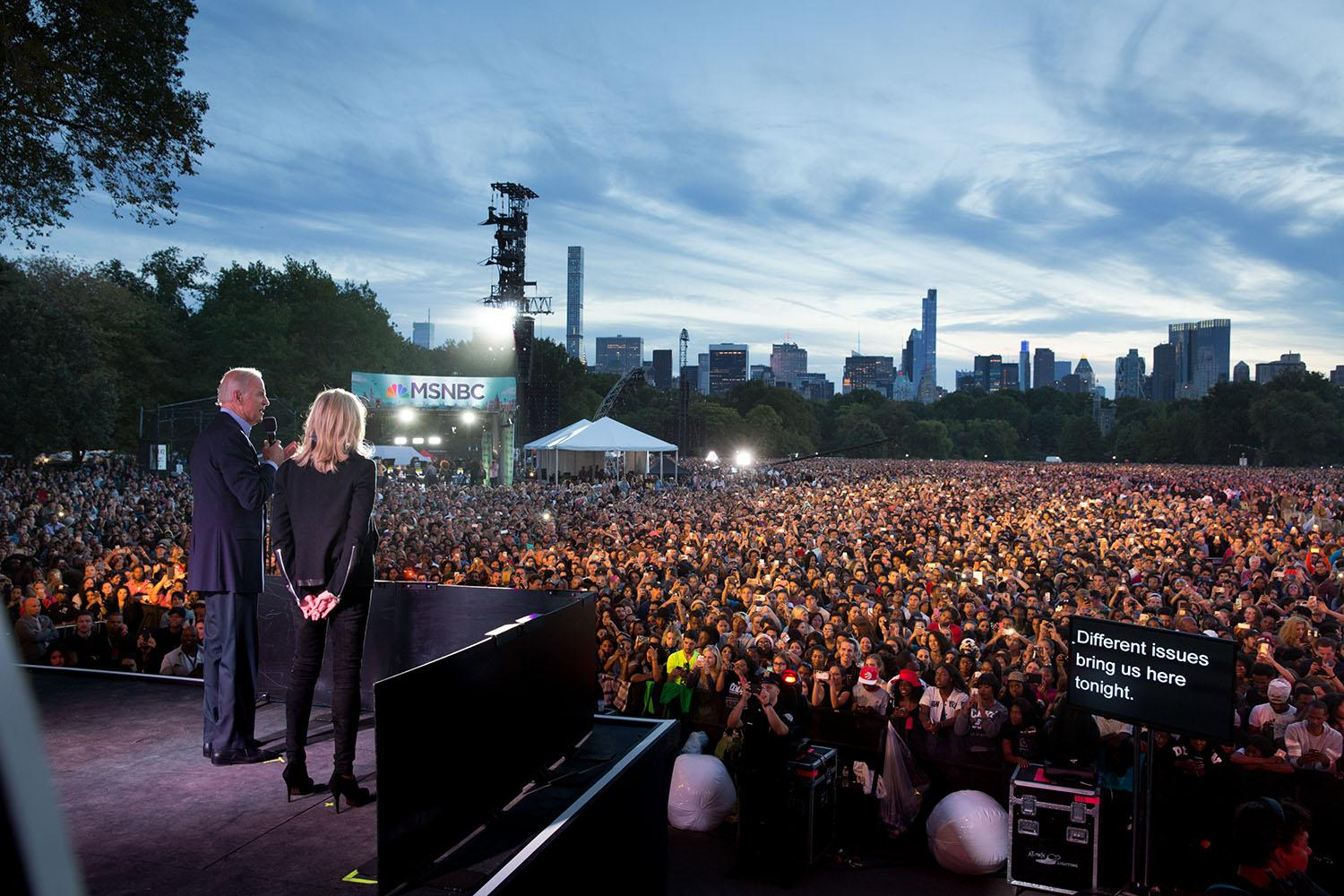
Vice President Joe Biden speaking at the 2015 Global Citizen Festival in New York City

The 2015 festival, which was held on Central Park's Great Lawn in New York City on September 26, included performances by Beyoncé (joined by Ed Sheeran for "Drunk in Love"), Coldplay (joined by Ariana Grande for "Just a Little Bit of Your Heart"), Pearl Jam (joined by Beyoncé for "Redemption Song"), Ed Sheeran (joined by Chris Martin for "Thinking Out Loud"), and Fall Out Boy. Special appearances and speakers included Stephen Colbert, Hugh Jackman, Leonardo DiCaprio, Vice President Joe Biden and First Lady Michelle Obama. The show was broadcast live on MSNBC in the U.S. The Hong Kong free-to-air TV channel TVB Pearl aired the festival on the first day of January 2016. An edited one-hour special aired on NBC in the U.S. on September 27 and the BBC One in the UK on September 28. The edited version also aired in Australia on September 30, on the Nine Network.

=== 2016 ===
==== Montreal, Canada ====
The 2016 Global Citizen Canada was held on September 17, 2016, in Montreal, Canada, at Bell Centre. This performance was held a week before the Global Citizen Festival in New York. The headliners included Usher backed by The Roots, Metric, and Grimes, as well as special guest Half Moon Run, and Charlotte Cardin. There were also special appearances by Prime Minister of Canada Justin Trudeau and Bill Gates.

The 2016 festival was held on September 24 in New York City at Central Park's Great Lawn and included performances by headliners Rihanna, Kendrick Lamar, Demi Lovato, Major Lazer, and Metallica, as well as special guests Usher, Coldplay's Chris Martin, Pearl Jam's Eddie Vedder, Ellie Goulding, Yandel, and Yusuf / Cat Stevens. Lovato replaced Selena Gomez, who was originally slated to be one of the festival's headliners, but had to pull out of the lineup for health reasons. Special appearances and speakers included Chelsea Handler, Deborra-Lee and Hugh Jackman, Neil Patrick Harris, Priyanka Chopra, Salma Hayek Pinault, and Seth Meyers. The event was broadcast live on MSNBC.

==== Mumbai, India ====
The 2016 festival was also hosted in Mumbai, India, where it was headlined by Coldplay and Jay Z. Prime Minister of India Narendra Modi made a short address to the crowd via video conference. Other performers included Demi Lovato, A. R. Rahman, The Vamps, Arijit Singh, Shraddha Kapoor, Sonakshi Sinha, Shankar–Ehsaan–Loy, Monali Thakur, Ranveer Singh. Farhan Akhtar, and Amitabh Bachchan. There were also appearances by Indian film actors Shah Rukh Khan, Parineeti Chopra, Sonam Kapoor, Vidya Balan, Alia Bhatt, Ayushmann Khurrana, and Arjun Kapoor, and cricket legend Sachin Tendulkar.

=== 2017 ===
==== Hamburg, Germany ====
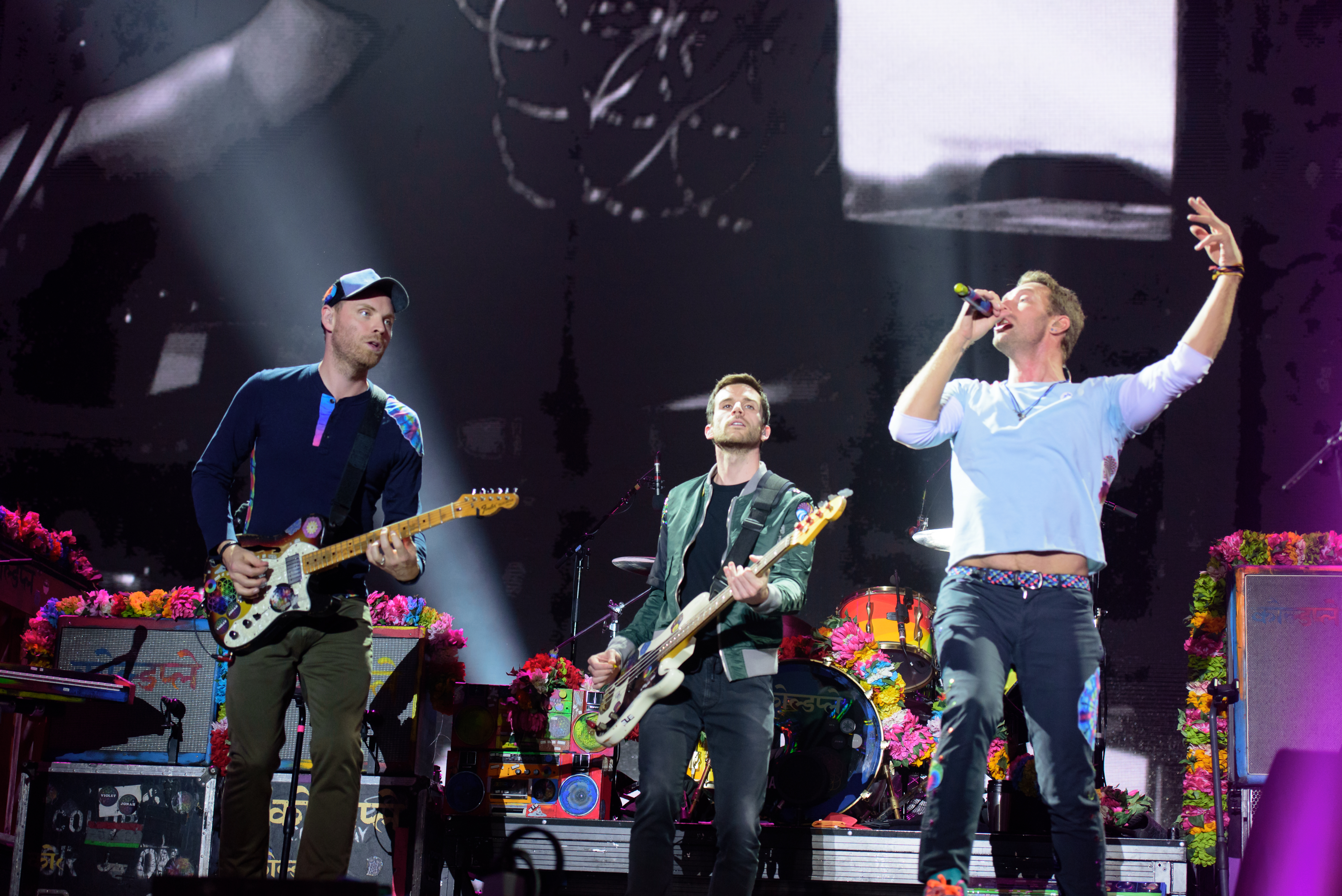
Coldplay at the 2017 Global Citizen Festival in Hamburg

In 2017, the festival was held on the eve of the G20 Hamburg summit on July 6. The concert in the Barclaycard Arena was headlined by Coldplay, Shakira, and Herbert Grönemeyer. Other performers and presenters included Pharrell Williams, Ellie Goulding, Demi Lovato, Khatia Buniatishvili, Andreas Bourani, Sido, Lena, Elyas M'Barek, Hadnet Tesfai, Nikeata Thompson, Barbara Schöneberger, and Linda Zervakis. Appearances of politicians during the concert included the first mayor of Hamburg Olaf Scholz, Justin Trudeau, Erna Solberg, Mauricio Macri, and Sigmar Gabriel. The event was broadcast live on the Global Citizen Festival's YouTube channel. During the event, Argentinian president Mauricio Macri announced that the Global Citizen Festival would be invited to the 2018 G20 Buenos Aires summit.

==== New York City ====
The main 2017 festival was held at Central Park's Great Lawn in New York City on September 23 and was headlined by Stevie Wonder, Green Day, The Killers, The Lumineers, and The Chainsmokers, with special performances by Pharrell Williams, Big Sean, Andra Day, and Alessia Cara. Some of the notable hosts and presenters were Hugh Jackman, Demi Lovato, Jane Goodall, Whoopi Goldberg, Priyanka Chopra, Lupita Nyong'o, Connie Britton, and Camren Bicondova. During his performance, Wonder took a knee in solidarity with the U.S. national anthem protests.

=== 2018 ===
==== New York City ====
The main 2018 festival was held at Central Park's Great Lawn in New York City on September 29 and was headlined by Janet Jackson, The Weeknd, Shawn Mendes, Cardi B and Janelle Monáe, with John Legend being a special guest performer. Some of the notable hosts and presenters were Hugh Jackman, Deborra-lee Furness, Danai Gurira, Chris Martin, Naomi Campbell, Dakota Johnson, Robert De Niro, New York Governor Andrew Cuomo, and U.S. Sen. Chris Coons. During the festival, a loud noise was heard by some attendees, leading to many believing there was an active shooter, as many ran toward the nearest exit. It was first believed to be as a result of a large police barrier having collapsed, but it was soon revealed to be from someone stepping on and popping a drink bottle. The situation was soon resolved and the festival continued, although some attendees were unable to re-enter the park for the festival and a few dozen were injured.

==== Johannesburg, South Africa ====
It was announced that a festival would take place on December 2 in the FNB Stadium, Johannesburg, South Africa, that would celebrate the life's work and lasting legacy of Nelson Mandela for his 100th birthday. Beyoncé and Jay-Z headlined the festival, followed by performances from Cassper Nyovest, Chris Martin, Kacey Musgraves, Pharrell Williams, Eddie Vedder, Ed Sheeran, D'banj, Femi Kuti, Sho Madjozi, Tiwa Savage, Usher and Wizkid. Presenters included Naomi Campbell, Bob Geldof, Gayle King, Tyler Perry, Trevor Noah, Forest Whitaker and Bonang Matheba. Oprah Winfrey delivered the keynote address for the event, which served as the culmination of Mandela 100, Global Citizen's collaboration with the House of Mandela.

The Johannesburg show was marred by violence as many concertgoers were robbed and assaulted outside the venue by armed attackers, allegedly due to a total lack of police and security presence. Twitter users reported that SAPS had not given them the help they needed though they were asked multiple times. It caused a debate whether the festival should have had more security or lack of help from the security and SAPS.

=== 2019 ===
The main 2019 festival took place on September 28 at Central Park's Great Lawn in New York City, with Queen + Adam Lambert, Pharrell Williams, Alicia Keys, OneRepublic, H.E.R., and Carole King headlining, and French Montana, Ben Platt, Jon Batiste and Stay Human, David Gray, and NCT 127 as special guest performers. Hugh Jackman and Deborra-lee Furness returned to host the festival alongside Matt Bomer, Connie Britton, Rachel Brosnahan, Leonardo DiCaprio, Nina Dobrev, Elvis Duran, Becky G, Taraji P. Henson, Dakota Johnson, Becky Lynch, Aasif Mandvi, Rami Malek, Greta Thunberg, Bridget Moynahan, Bill Nye, Kal Penn, Natalie Portman, Joy Reid, Erin Richards, Seth Rollins, Savannah Sellers, and Forest Whitaker.

=== 2020: Together at Home ===
Due to the fallout of the COVID-19 pandemic, the 2020 festival was cancelled. It was replaced with One World: Together at Home, a benefit concert that was organized by Global Citizen in support of the World Health Organization. It was televised live worldwide. The special was intended to promote the practice of social distancing while staying together during the pandemic. Various singers performed live from their homes, and various celebrities appeared and hosted the show. Lady Gaga curated the special.

=== 2021: Global Citizen Live ===
The 2021 event took place concurrently in multiple cities around the world, including Lagos, Seoul, Paris, New York City, Rio de Janeiro, Los Angeles, London, Mumbai, and Sydney, on September 25–26.

=== 2022 ===
==== New York City ====
The main 2022 festival took place on September 24 at Central Park's Great Lawn in New York City, with Metallica, Charlie Puth, the Jonas Brothers, Måneskin, Mariah Carey, Mickey Guyton and Rosalía headlining and Priyanka Chopra Jonas hosting.

==== Accra, Ghana ====
A parallel edition was held at Black Star Square in Accra, Ghana the same day featuring performances from Usher, SZA, Stormzy, Tems, Uncle Waffles, Gyakie, Sarkodie, and Stonebwoy. Usher also brought three surprise guests onto the stage, Pheelz, Tiwa Savage and Oxlade. The event was hosted by Danai Gurira, alongside presenters Berla Mundi, Joselyn Dumas, Michaela Coel, Nomzamo Mbatha and Sabrina Dhowre Elba.

=== 2023 ===
The main 2023 festival took place on September 23 at Central Park's Great Lawn in New York City, with Red Hot Chili Peppers, Ms. Lauryn Hill, Jung Kook, Anitta, Conan Gray, D-Nice, Sofia Carson and Stray Kids headlining.

=== 2024 ===
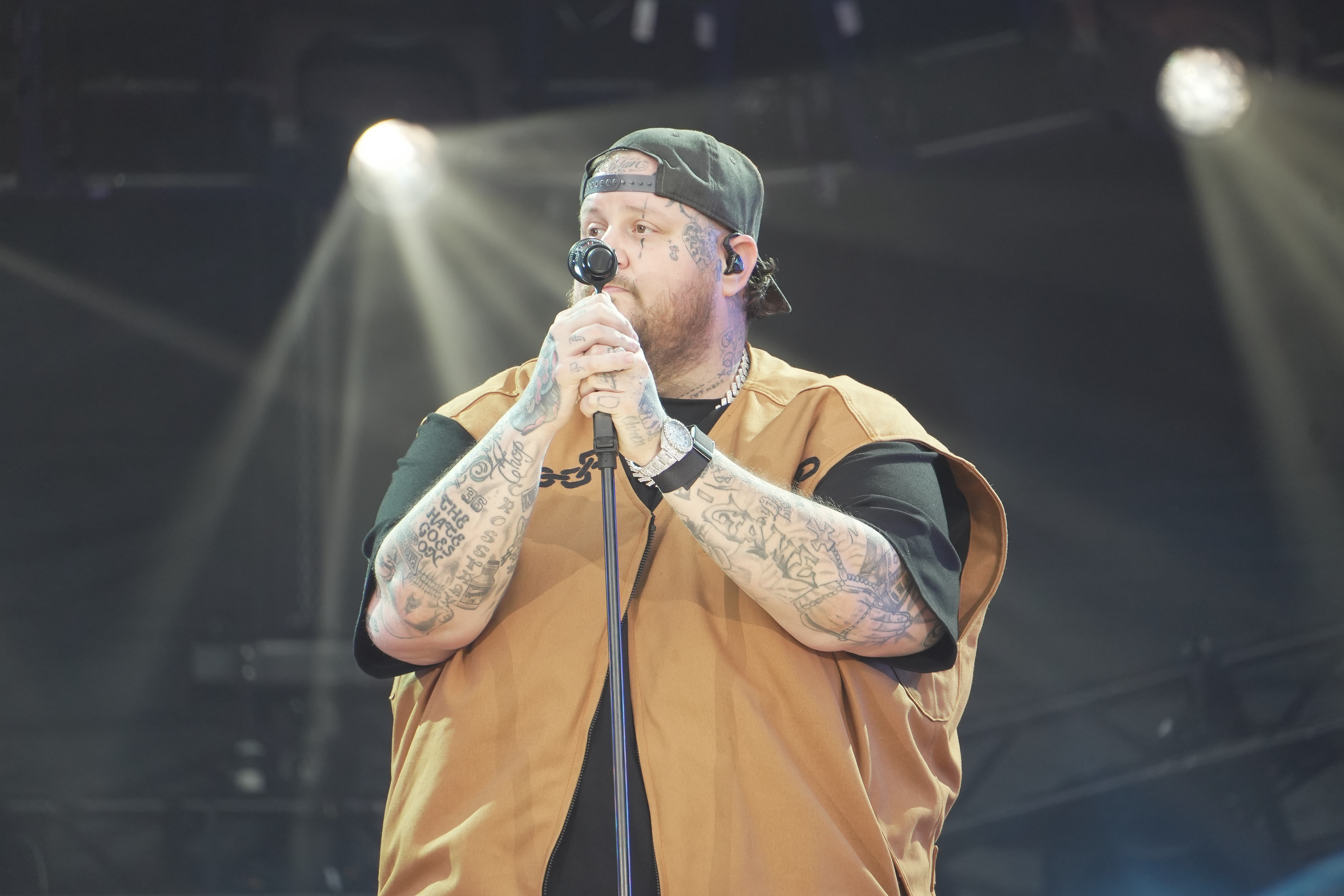
Jelly Roll at the 2024 Global Citizen Festival in New York City

The main 2024 festival took place on September 28 at Central Park's Great Lawn in New York City. The venues for the 2025 FIFA Club World Cup in the United States were announced at the festival. Performers included Post Malone, Jelly Roll, LISA, Doja Cat, and Chris Martin with special guest Ed Sheeran.

=== 2025 ===
The main 2025 festival took place on November 1st at Mangueirão stadium in Belém, Brazil. Performers included Charlie Puth, Chris Martin, Anitta, Gilberto Gil, Seu Jorge, Gaby Amarantos and Viviane Batidão.

=== 2026 ===
==== Rio de Janeiro ====
Global Citizen Live: Rio de Janeiro was held on June 6, 2026, at Botafogo Bay, featuring Lauryn Hill, Wyclef Jean, YG Marley, Zion Marley, and Ludmilla.

==== Tokyo ====
Global Citizen Live: Tokyo, Global Citizen's first-ever live concert event in Japan, was held at the Tokyo International Forum on June 18, 2026, featuring headliner Yoshiki and performances by &Team, Ai, and Yuki Chiba, with Chris Peppler serving as MC.

==== New York City ====
The Global Citizen Festival was originally scheduled to be held in New York City on September 26, 2026 however it was cancelled due to inclement weather from a nor'easter. This marks the first time that the festival was cancelled as a result from inclement weather and the second time overall.
