= Sister (S!sters song) =

2019 song by Sisters

Single by Sisters
- Released: 22 February 2019
- Length: 3:00
- Label: Anchor; Universal
- Songwriters: Laurell Barker; Marine Kaltenbacher; Tom Oehler; Thomas Stengaard

Music video
- "Sister" on YouTube

Eurovision Song Contest 2019 entry
- Country: Germany
- Artist: Sisters
- Language: English
- Composers: Laurell Barker; Marine Kaltenbacher; Tom Oehler; Thomas Stengaard
- Lyricists: Laurell Barker; Marine Kaltenbacher; Tom Oehler; Thomas Stengaard

Finals performance
- Final result: 25th
- Final points: 24

Entry chronology
- ◄ "You Let Me Walk Alone" (2018)
- "Violent Thing" (2020) ►

Official performance video
- "Sister" (Grand Final) on YouTube

"Sister" is a 2019 single by German duo Sisters (stylised as S!sters). The song represented Germany in the Eurovision Song Contest 2019 in Tel Aviv, Israel after winning Unser Lied für Israel, Germany's national final. In the final, the song would earn a 25th place finish, earning 24 points, all coming from the jury vote.

== Background ==
According to the duo, the song brings a message of wanting women to put aside their differences and drama to get along together. The song does not talk about literal sisters; however, it does talk about women "putting their sisters down", meaning their fellow compatriots. Carlotta, in an interview with Eurovision fansite Wiwibloggs, had said that the duo "want to be the women who will help other women grow".

== Eurovision Song Contest ==
=== Unser Lied für Israel ===
Unser Lied für Israel (English: Our Song for Israel) was the competition that selected Germany's entry for the Eurovision Song Contest 2019. The competition took place on 22 February 2019 at the Studio Berlin Adlershof in Berlin, hosted by Linda Zervakis and Barbara Schöneberger. Seven acts competed during the show, with the winner being selected through a combination of votes from a 100-member Eurovision panel, a twenty-member international expert jury panel and public voting. The show was broadcast on Das Erste, One and Deutsche Welle as well as online via ARD's official website daserste.de.

The competition featured seven competing acts performing a song especially written for Eurovision and the winner was selected through a combination of votes from a 100-member Eurovision panel, a 20-member international expert jury panel and public voting. The international jury panel consisted of members who had been national juries for their respective countries at the Eurovision Song Contest, while the Eurovision panel consisted of German television viewers selected in cooperation with Simon-Kucher and Digame through surveys on social media in order to reflect the taste of the wider European audience.

The televised final took place on 22 February 2019. The winning song, "Sister", was selected through a combination of votes from a 100-member Eurovision panel (1/3), a twenty-member international jury panel (1/3) and public voting (1/3), including options for landline and SMS voting. While only getting six points from the Eurovision panel, they managed to get the maximum 12 points from both the international jury and televote, earning 30 points, securing a win and the spot for Germany in the Eurovision Song Contest 2019.

=== At Eurovision ===
The Eurovision Song Contest 2019 took place at Expo Tel Aviv in Tel Aviv, Israel and consisted of two semi-finals on 14 and 16 May and the final on 18 May 2019. According to Eurovision rules, all nations with the exceptions of the host country and the "Big Five" (France, Germany, Italy, Spain and the United Kingdom) are required to qualify from one of two semi-finals in order to compete for the final; the top ten countries from each semi-final progress to the final. As a member of the "Big Five", Germany automatically qualifies to compete in the final.

In the final, "Sister" received 24 points from the jury, and zero televote points, finishing in 25th place out of 26 finalists.

== Track listing ==
Digital download
No.	Title	Length
1.	"Sister"	3:00
2.	"Sister" (Karaoke Version)	3:00
