= Ghanaian cedi =

Currency of Ghana

- Cedi banknotes

ISO 4217
- Code: GHS (numeric: 936)
- Subunit: 0.01

Units of account
- Plural: cedis
- Symbol: GH₵ (also often GH¢)
- Subunit
- 1/100: pesewa
- Plural
- pesewa: pesewas
- Symbol
- pesewa: Gp

Denominations
- Banknotes
- Freq. used: GH₵5, GH₵10, GH₵20, GH₵50, GH₵100, GH₵200
- Rarely used: GH₵1, GH₵2
- Coins
- Freq. used: 50Gp, GH₵1, GH₵2
- Rarely used: 1Gp, 5Gp, 10Gp, 20Gp

Demographics
- Replaced: Ghanaian pound
- User(s): Ghana

Issuance
- Central bank: Bank of Ghana
- Website: www.bog.gov.gh

Valuation
- Inflation: 17%
- Source: Ghana Statistical Service

The cedi (/ˈsiːdiː/ SEE-dee; currency sign: GH₵; currency code: GHS) is the unit of currency of Ghana. It is the fourth historical and only current legal tender in the Republic of Ghana. One Cedi is divided into one hundred Pesewas (Gp).

After independence in 1957, Ghana separated itself from the British West African pound, which was the currency of the British colonies in the region. The new republic's first independent currency was the Ghanaian pound (1958–1965). In 1965, Ghana decided to leave the British colonial monetary system and adopt the widely accepted decimal system. The African name Cedi (1965–1967) was introduced in place of the old British pound system. Ghana's first President Kwame Nkrumah introduced Cedi notes and Pesewa coins in July 1965 to replace the Ghanaian pounds, shillings and pence. The Cedi bore the portrait of the President and was equivalent to eight shillings and four pence (8s 4d), i.e. one hundred old pence, so that 1 pesewa was equal to one penny.

After the February 1966 military coup, the new leaders wanted to remove the face of Nkrumah from the banknotes. The "new Cedi" (1967–2007) was worth 1.2 Cedis, which made it equal to half of a pound sterling (or ten shillings sterling) at its introduction. Decades of high inflation devalued the new Cedi, so that in 2007 the largest of the "new cedi" banknotes, the 20,000 note, had a value of about US$2. The new cedi was gradually phased out in 2007 in favour of the "Ghana Cedi" at an exchange rate of 1:10,000. By removing four digits, the Ghana Cedi became the highest-denominated currency unit issued in Africa. It has since lost more than 90% of its value.

== Etymology ==
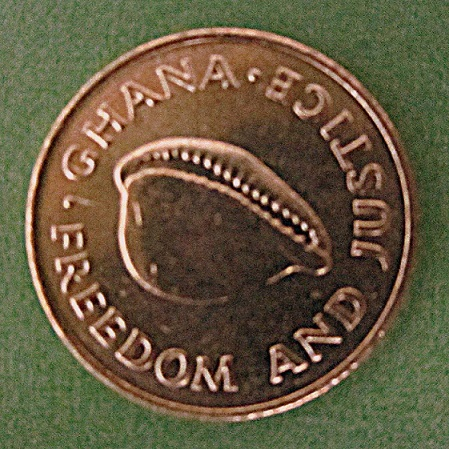
Cedi with a cowry

The word cedi is the Akan word for cowry shell. Cowries (plural of cowry) were formerly used as currency in what is now Ghana. The Monetaria moneta or money cowry is not native to West African waters but is a common species in the Indian Ocean. The porcelain-like shells came to West Africa, beginning in the 14th century, through trade with Arab merchants. The first modern coins exclusively used at the Gold Coast were produced in 1796 but cowries were used alongside coins and gold as currency until 1901.

== History ==
=== First cedi, 1965–1967 ===
First cedi
Preceded by: Ghanaian pound Reason: decimalisation Ratio: 2.4 first cedi = 1 pound, or 1 pesewa = 1 pennyAS	Succeeded by: Second cedi Reason: convenience of exchange and an opportunity to remove Kwame Nkrumah from coins and notes Ratio: 1 second cedi = 1.2 first cedis

The first cedi was introduced in 1965, replacing the pound at a rate of 2.4 cedi = 1 pound, or 1 pesewa = 1 penny. The first cedi was pegged to sterling at a rate of 2.4 cedis = £1, or 8s 4d per cedi.

=== Second cedi (GHC), 1967–2007 ===
Second cedi (New cedi)
Preceded by: First cedi Reason: convenience of exchange and an opportunity to remove Kwame Nkrumah from coins and notes Ratio: 1 second cedi = 1.2 first cedis = 10 shillings	Currency of Ghana; 23 February 1967 – 2 July 2007	Succeeded by: Third cedi Reason: inflation Ratio: 1 third cedi = 10,000 second cedis

The first cedi was replaced in 1967 by a "new cedi" which was worth 1.2 first cedis. This allowed a decimal conversion with the pound, namely 2 second cedis = 1 pound. The change also provided an opportunity to remove Kwame Nkrumah's image from coins and notes.

The second cedi was initially pegged to sterling at a rate of ₵2 = £1. However, within months, the second cedi was devalued to a rate of ₵2.45 = £1, less than the initial value of the first cedi. This rate was equivalent to ₵1 = 0.98 U.S. dollars and the rate to the dollar was maintained when sterling was devalued in November 1967. Further pegs were set of $0.55 in 1971, $0.78 in 1972, and $0.8696 in 1973 before the currency was floated in 1978. High inflation ensued, and so the cedi was re-pegged at ₵2.80 = $1.00.

The cedi's value continued to be eaten away on the black market. In the early 1980s, the government started cracking down on the retail of products at prices other than the official established sale price (also known as price controls). This had the effect of driving nearly all commerce underground, where black market prices for commodities were the norm, and nothing existed on store shelves. By 1983, one U.S. dollar equalled about 120 cedis on the black market; a pack of cigarettes cost about ₵150 (if they could be found), but the bank rate continued at ₵2.80 = $1.00. Finally, with foreign currency completely drying up for all import transactions, Ghana was forced to begin a process of gradual devaluation, as well as a liberalization of its strict price controls. This process ended in 1990 with a free float of the cedi against foreign currencies. Inflation continued (see the exchange rate chart) until by July 2007, one US dollar was worth about ₵9500, and a transition to the third cedi was initiated.

In 1979 a currency confiscation took place. New banknotes were issued which were exchanged for old ones at a rate of 10 old notes for 7 new ones. Coins and bank accounts were unaffected.

A second confiscation took place in 1982, when the ₵50 note (the highest denomination) was demonetized. Ghanaians, in theory, could exchange any number of ₵50 notes for coins or other banknotes without loss, but foreigners could not make any exchange. However, many Ghanaians who were hoarding large amounts of cedis feared reprisal if they tried to convert all of it, and so simply burned a lot of their money. Meanwhile, Ghanaians in the United Kingdom received "promise payment notes" from banks, but never received compensation. This confiscation of money was publicly justified as a means to create a disincentive for the flourishing black market. However, from a monetary perspective, currency confiscations have the effect of reducing available cash reserves in the economy of Ghana, thereby slowing the rate of inflation. After the ₵50 note confiscation, the ₵20 note was the highest cedi denomination, but had a street value of only about $0.35 (U.S.)

After the ₵50 note confiscation, fears existed that the government could also confiscate the ₵20 or even the ₵10 notes. This fear, along with inflation running at about 100% annually, started causing Ghanaians to lose faith in their country's own currency. Some transactions could only then be done in foreign currencies (although that was technically illegal), and other, more routine transactions began to revert to barter.

In 1991, 10, 20, 50, and 100 cedi coins were introduced, followed by 200 and 500 cedis in 1996. These six denominations were still in circulation until 2007. However, the 10 cedis (~0.1 U.S. cents) and 20 cedis (~0.2 U.S. cents) coins were not seen much due to their small value.

=== Third cedi (GHS), 2007–present ===
Third cedi (Ghanaian cedi)
Preceded by: Second cedi Reason: inflation Ratio: 1 third cedi = 10,000 second cedis	Currency of Ghana; 2 July 2007 – Present	Succeeded by: Current

Because of the rampant inflation in the decades before the exchange the second cedi was only worth a small fraction of its original value. The government decided to "cut" four zeros off the currency by switching to the third cedi. The new currency was not introduced as the third cedi but is instead officially called the "Ghanaian cedi" (GH₵), in contrast to the second cedi that was officially known as the "new cedi". In the second half of 2007 both the second and third cedi were legal tender as the old currency was being gradually withdrawn. At the end of December 2007, more than 90% of all old coins and notes had been withdrawn. From January 2008 old banknotes could only be exchanged at banks and were no longer legal tender.

On 14 May 2010, a GH₵2 banknote was issued to meet public need for an intermediate denomination and reduce the frequency, and associated cost, of printing large volumes of the GH₵1 banknote. The introduction of the new denomination coincided with the conclusion of the year-long centenary celebrations of the birth of Kwame Nkrumah, Ghana's first president, and has the commemorative text "Centenary of the Birth of Dr. Kwame Nkrumah".

Due to periods of "sustained high inflation" and "perennial depreciation of the currency", the Bank of Ghana on 29 November 2019, announced the issuance of a new 2-cedi coin and as well as new 100 and 200-cedi banknotes. Existing 1 and 2 cedi banknotes remain legal tender, though these denominations will be gradually replaced by coins to reduce costs.

The third Cedi has been losing value continuously since it was introduced. In 2014, the inflation rose rapidly as the value of the third cedi fell to a fourth of its original value. The devaluation was temporarily halted in the last quarter of 2014 as the currency stabilized due to a pending IMF bailout of Ghana.

Due to its negligible purchasing power, the one pesewa coin is rarely seen in circulation. In September 2021, the Bank of Ghana began the process of withdrawing GH₵1 and GH₵2 notes from circulation to encourage the use of coins of their corresponding face values.

In August 2022, accelerating inflation and continued economic mismanagement has caused the cedi's value to drop to 10 U.S. cents (GH₵10 = US$1). As of September 2022, the annual inflation rate of 37.2% as reported by the Ghana Statistical Service was the highest since 2001.

From the end of 2021 to 2024, the cedi was the world's worst-performing currency, depreciating to around GH₵15 per U.S. dollar in October 2022 before reaching its current all-time low of GH₵16.4 per U.S. dollar in November 2024. However, in 2025, the cedi made a remarkable turnaround, becoming the world's best-performing currency. As of 10 September 2025, the exchange rate is around GH₵12.25 per U.S. dollar.

Ghana’s President John Dramani Mahama said his government is promoting fiscal discipline and economic stability as part of its "Resetting Ghana" agenda. Speaking to Zambia’s National Assembly, he highlighted steps taken since returning to office, including reducing the number of ministers and deputies to 58 to lower government costs and restructuring public debt with a focus on investing in human capital. Mahama stated these reforms have contributed to a sharp drop in inflation—from about 23.4 % in late 2024 to 3.8 % in January 2026—and noted the Ghanaian cedi appreciated by 32 % in 2025. He also pointed to efforts to increase value from natural resources, including boosting gold output under the "Gold Board" and moving toward local processing of manganese and bauxite.

== Coins ==
The Bank of Ghana has been issuing all Ghanaian coins since 1958. Beside the coins in general circulation the bank has also issued commemorative coins. These special coins have been issued in shillings (1958), crowns (1965), pounds (1958–1977), sikas (1997–2003) and cedis (2013–). It is unclear if the Bank of Ghana considered commemorative crowns and sikas together with the commemorative pounds that were coined after 1965 as legal tender or simply as medallions.

Only coins that have been or are in general circulation are included in this list. The years of issue does not indicate that the series have been coined every year in the period but that the coin has been issued more than once in the stated period. Some coins are held back and released years after they are issued. This means that in the general circulation there are worn out coins and coins in mint condition from the same issuing year. The Bank of Ghana has never stated if they are simply holding back already stamped coins until they are needed or if they are stamping coins successively with old issue years.

=== First cedi (1965–67) ===
First cedi (Legal tender: 1965–67)
Image	Value	Description						Date of issue
Obverse & Reverse	Value	Obverse	Reverse	Metal	Weight	Diameter	Edge	Date of issue
	5 pesewas	Kwame Nkrumah (Lettering:); CIVITATIS GHANIENSIS CONDITOR (Latin: Founder of the Ghanaian State); KWAME NKRUMAH	Five-pointed star (Lettering:); The value of the coin & 1965	Copper-nickel	4.1 g	22 mm	Smooth	19 July 1965
	10 pesewas	Kwame Nkrumah (Lettering:); CIVITATIS GHANIENSIS CONDITOR (Latin: Founder of the Ghanaian State); KWAME NKRUMAH	Five-pointed star (Lettering:); The value of the coin & 1965	Copper-nickel	3.2 g	20 mm	Milled	19 July 1965
	25 pesewas	Kwame Nkrumah (Lettering:); CIVITATIS GHANIENSIS CONDITOR (Latin: Founder of the Ghanaian State); KWAME NKRUMAH	Five-pointed star (Lettering:); The value of the coin & 1965	Copper-nickel	8.65 g	27.4 mm	Milled	19 July 1965
	50 pesewas	Kwame Nkrumah (Lettering:); CIVITATIS GHANIENSIS CONDITOR (Latin: Founder of the Ghanaian State); KWAME NKRUMAH	Five-pointed star (Lettering:); The value of the coin & 1965	Copper-nickel	13.9 g	32 mm	Reeded	19 July 1965

=== Second cedi ===
Second cedi (Legal tender: 1967–2007)
Image	Value	Description						Years of issue
Obverse & Reverse	Value	Obverse	Reverse	Metal	Weight	Diameter	Edge	Years of issue
	1/2 pesewa	Adowa drums (Lettering:); GHANA; FREEDOM AND JUSTICE	Five-pointed star (Lettering:); The value of the coin & The year of issue	Bronze	2.9 g	20.2 mm	Smooth	1967
	1 pesewa	Adowa drums (Lettering:); GHANA; FREEDOM AND JUSTICE	Five-pointed star (Lettering:); The value of the coin & The year of issue	Bronze	5.72 g	25.47 mm	Smooth	1967–1979
	2 1/2 pesewas	Cacao fruits (Lettering:); GHANA; FREEDOM AND JUSTICE	The shield from the coat of arms of Ghana (Lettering:); The value of the coin & The year of issue	Copper-nickel	3.2 g	19.5 mm	Smooth	1967
	5 pesewas	Cacao fruits (Lettering:); GHANA; FREEDOM AND JUSTICE	The shield from the coat of arms of Ghana (Lettering:); The value of the coin & The year of issue	Copper-nickel	2.85 g	19 mm	Reeded	1967–1975
	10 pesewas	Cacao fruits (Lettering:); GHANA; FREEDOM AND JUSTICE	The shield from the coat of arms of Ghana (Lettering:); The value of the coin & The year of issue	Copper-nickel	5.6 g	23.5 mm	Reeded	1967–1979
	20 pesewas	Cacao fruits (Lettering:); GHANA; FREEDOM AND JUSTICE	The shield from the coat of arms of Ghana (Lettering:); The value of the coin & The year of issue	Copper-nickel	11.2 g	28 mm	Reeded	1967–1979
	50 pesewas	Cacao fruits (Lettering:); GHANA; FREEDOM AND JUSTICE	The shield from the coat of arms of Ghana (Lettering:); The value of the coin & The year of issue	Copper-nickel	12.5 g	32 mm	Milled	1979
	1 cedi	Cowry shell (Lettering:); GHANA; FREEDOM AND JUSTICE	The shield from the coat of arms of Ghana (Lettering:); The value of the coin & The year of issue	Brass	11.9 g	30 mm	Smooth	1979

=== Third cedi ===
The new coins are 1 pesewa (100 old cedi), 5 pesewas (500), 10 pesewas (1,000), 20 pesewas (2,000), 50 pesewas (5,000), 1 cedi (10,000) and 2 cedis (20,000).

== Banknotes ==
The Bank of Ghana has issued all Ghanaian banknotes since 1958. Most of the Ghanaian banknotes have been changed slightly from one year's issue to the next year's issue in the ongoing technological fight against counterfeit money. The signature on the notes also changes when a new governor takes over the management of the Bank of Ghana. Such changes are frequent and are not covered in this list. The years of issue do not indicate that the series has been printed every year in the period, but that the banknote has been issued more than once in the given period.

=== First cedi (1965–67) ===
First cedi (Legal tender: 1965–67)
Image	Value	Description		Date of issue
Obverse & Reverse	Value	Obverse	Reverse	Date of issue
	1 cedi	Kwame Nkrumah	Bank of Ghana	19 July 1965
	5 cedis	Kwame Nkrumah	Supreme Court	19 July 1965
	10 cedis	Kwame Nkrumah	Black Star Gate	19 July 1965
	50 cedis	Kwame Nkrumah	Seashore, Palms	19 July 1965
	100 cedis	Kwame Nkrumah	Kumasi Central Hospital	19 July 1965
	1,000 cedis (Only used in Interbanking Transactions)	Black Star	Bank of Ghana	19 July 1965

=== Second cedi (1967–2007) ===
==== 1967 to 1979 ====
Second cedi – 1st series (Legal tender: 1967–79)
Image	Value	Description		Years of issue
Obverse & Reverse	Value	Obverse	Reverse	Years of issue
	1 cedi	Cocoa	Shield and sword	1967–1971
	5 cedis	Fauna carvings	Fauna carvings	1967–1969
	10 cedis	Art projects	Statuettes	1967–1970

Second cedi – 2nd series (Legal tender: 1972–79)
Image	Value	Description		Years of issue
Obverse & Reverse	Value	Obverse	Reverse	Years of issue
	1 cedi	Young girl	Cocoa farmer	1973–1978
	2 cedis	Farmer	Fishermen	1972–78
	5 cedis	Woman	Larabanga Mosque	1973–1978
	10 cedis	Pipe smoker	Akosombo Dam	1973–1978

==== 1979 to 2007 ====
Second cedi – 3rd series (Legal tender: 1979–2007)
Image	Value	Description		Years of issue
Obverse & Reverse	Value	Obverse	Reverse	Years of issue
	1 cedi	Young man	Basket weaver	1979–1982
	2 cedis	Schoolgirl	Field workers	1979–1982
	5 cedis	Old man	Lumberers	1979–1982
	10 cedis	Young woman	Fishermen	1979–1982
	20 cedis	Miner	Kente weaver	1979–1982
	50 cedis (Demonetized in 1982)	Old man	Cocoa farmers	1979–1980

Second cedi – 4th series (Legal tender: 1983–2007)
Image	Value	Description		Years of issue	
Obverse & Reverse	Value	Obverse	Reverse	Start	End
	10 cedis	W. O. II Larbi, Fred Otoo, E. Kwasi Nukpor	Rural bank building	1984	1984
	20 cedis	Queen Mother Yaa Asantewaa	Miner, army officer, student, demonstrators	1984	1986
	50 cedis	Young man	Workers drying grain	1983	1986
	100 cedis	Docia Kisseih	Loading produce	1983	1991
	200 cedis	Old man	Teacher and students	1983	1993
	500 cedis	Black star, fist, and "Gye Nyame"	Cocoa and miner	1986	1994
	1,000 cedis	Diamonds	Cocoa harvest	1991	2003
	2,000 cedis	Adomi Bridge	Fishermen	1994	2006
	5,000 cedis	Coat of arms of Ghana	Cargo ships and logs	1994	2006
	10,000 cedis	The Big Six	Black Star Gate	2002	2006
	20,000 cedis	Ephraim Amu	National Theatre of Ghana	2002	2006

=== Third cedi (2007–present) ===
Third cedi
Image	Value	Dimensions	Main Colour	Description		First issued
Obverse & Reverse	Value	Dimensions	Main Colour	Obverse	Reverse	First issued
	1 cedi	137 × 65 mm	Red	The Big Six, Black Star Gate	Akosombo Dam	3 July 2007
	2 cedis	140 × 67 mm	Beige	Kwame Nkrumah	Parliament House	14 May 2010
	5 cedis	141 × 68 mm	Blue	The Big Six, Black Star Gate	University of Ghana, The Balme Library	3 July 2007
	5 cedis	147 × 68 mm	Blue	James Emman Kwegyir Aggrey	Kwame Nkrumah vessel in Tweneboa, Enyenra, and Ntomme oil fields	7 March 2017 (commemorative issue); 4 August 2017 (regular issue)
	10 cedis	145 × 71 mm	Yellow-green	The Big Six, Black Star Gate	Bank of Ghana	3 July 2007
	20 cedis	149 × 74 mm	Purple	The Big Six, Black Star Gate	Supreme Court	3 July 2007
	50 cedis	153 × 77 mm	Brown	The Big Six, Black Star Gate	Christiansborg Castle	3 July 2007
	100 cedis	157 x 80 mm	Cyan	The Big Six, Black Star Gate	Interior of the Parliament of Ghana	2 December 2019
	200 cedis	161 x 83 mm	Orange	The Big Six, Black Star Gate	Jubilee House	2 December 2019

=== Heritage Series (2026) ===
Value	Obverse	Reverse
1 cedi	Agnes Oforiwa Tagoe-Quarcoopome, Black Star Gate	Market women at the Makola Market
2 cedis	Peter Poreku Dery, Black Star Gate	Larabanga Mosque
5 cedis	James Emman Kwegyir Aggrey, Black Star Gate	Achimota School
10 cedis	Annie Jiagge, Black Star Gate, Black Star Gate	Supreme Court
20 cedis	Ephraim Amu, Black Star Gate	National Theatre of Ghana
50 cedis	Theodosia Okoh, Black Star Gate	Jubilee House
100 cedis	Kofi Annan, Black Star Gate	Kofi Annan International Peacekeeping Training Centre
200 cedis	Kwame Nkrumah, Black Star Gate	Kwame Nkrumah Mausoleum

== Exchange rate history ==
Historical values of one U.S. dollar in Ghanaian cedis
Date	Cedi per U.S$.	Date	Cedi per U.S$.
First cedi (Cedi)
1965	0.824	1967	0.714
Second cedi (New cedi)
1970s	~1.000 (0.833 to 1.111)	1980	2.80 Bank rate (~20 Black market)
1983	30.00 Bank rate (~120 Black market) (Oct 83)	1984	35.00 (Mar 84); 38.50 (Aug 84); 50 (Dec 84)
1985	50–60	1986	90
1987	150–175	1988	175–230
1989	230–300	1990	300–345
1991	345–390	1992	390–520
1993	555–825	1994	825–1050
1995	1050–1450	1996	1450–1750
1997	1750–2250	1998	2250–2350
1999	2350–3550	2000	3550–6750
2001	6750–7300	2002	7300–8450
2003	8450–8850	2004	8850–8900
2005	8900–9500	2006	9500–9600
2007	9300–9600		

Ghana Cedi (Third cedi)
Year	1 January	1 May	1 September	October 1
2008	0.930	1.005	1.155	1.159
2009	1.265	1.460	1.465	0.688
2010	1.430	1.425	1.440	1.429
2011	1.486	1.496	1.535	1.597
2012	1.639	1.855	1.932	1.893
2013	1.905	1.974	2.150	2.179
2014	2.353	2.823	3.723	3.219
2015	3.215	3.847	3.831	3.780
2016	3.809	3.789	3.963	3.963
2022	6.200	7.550	10.05	13.100
2023	11.000	12.100	14.01	15.243
2024	11.903	13.623	15.583	15.782
2025	14.694	14.143	11.681	12.482
2026	Pending	Pending	Pending	Pending

The price of one US$ in GH₵

Current GHS exchange rates
From Google Finance:	AUD CAD CHF CNY EUR GBP HKD JPY USD XOF
From Yahoo! Finance:	AUD CAD CHF CNY EUR GBP HKD JPY USD XOF
From XE.com:	AUD CAD CHF CNY EUR GBP HKD JPY USD XOF
From OANDA:	AUD CAD CHF CNY EUR GBP HKD JPY USD XOF

Note: Rates obtained from these websites may contradict with pegged rate mentioned above

== See also ==
- Economy of Ghana
- E-Cedi
- Previous Ghanaian currencies:
  - Money cowry
  - Akan goldweights (golddust)
  - Gold Coast ackey
  - British West African pound
  - Ghanaian pound
