= Lilly Among Clouds =

German singer-songwriter (born 1990)

- Born: Elisabeth Brüchner; 1990 (age 34–35); Straubing, Germany
- Occupations: Singer; songwriter; record producer
- Years active: 2015–present
- Website: lillyamongclouds.com

Lilly Among Clouds (born 1990) is a German singer-songwriter.

== Biography ==
Born Elisabeth Brüchner in 1990 into a musical family, Lilly was drawn to music as a young child, learning to play the piano and, later, guitar.

Inspired by Alanis Morissette, Tori Amos, Norah Jones and, later, Rihanna, she began writing songs and while still in her teens began performing under the name Lilly Among Thorns, playing in local clubs.

She never thought there might be a living in it until she entered a Finnish Battle of the Bands contest and came first, winning a slot at the following year's Maata Näkyvissä Festival in Turku, Finland.

At the age of 20, she moved to Würzburg in northern Bavaria, where she formed a band, also named Lilly Among Thorns, but never recorded anything.

Under Udo Rinklin direction, she blossomed creatively, winning the Würzburg Young Culture Prize in 2014. Changing the name of the band to Lilly Among Clouds, she recorded her self-released, eponymous debut EP with Rinklin, and it was well received, drawing comparison to Adele and Fiona Apple.

On 25 August 2017, she released her first album, Aerial Prospective.

In 2019 Lilly Among Clouds took part in the German preliminary decision for the Eurovision Song Contest 2019, Unser Lied für Israel, with the song Surprise and finished third.

On 27 September 2019, she released her second album, Green Flash.

== Discography ==
- 2015: Lilly Among Clouds (EP)
- 2017: Aerial Perspective (Album)
- 2018: Wasting My Time (Single)
- 2019: Surprise (Single)
- 2019: Love U 4ever (Single)
- 2019: Look at the Earth (Single)
- 2019: Girl Like Me (Single)
- 2019: Green Flash (Album)

== Awards ==
- 2014: Preis für junge Kultur der Stadt Würzburg (as Lilly)
