= Pavel Vítek =

Czech singer and actor (born 1962)

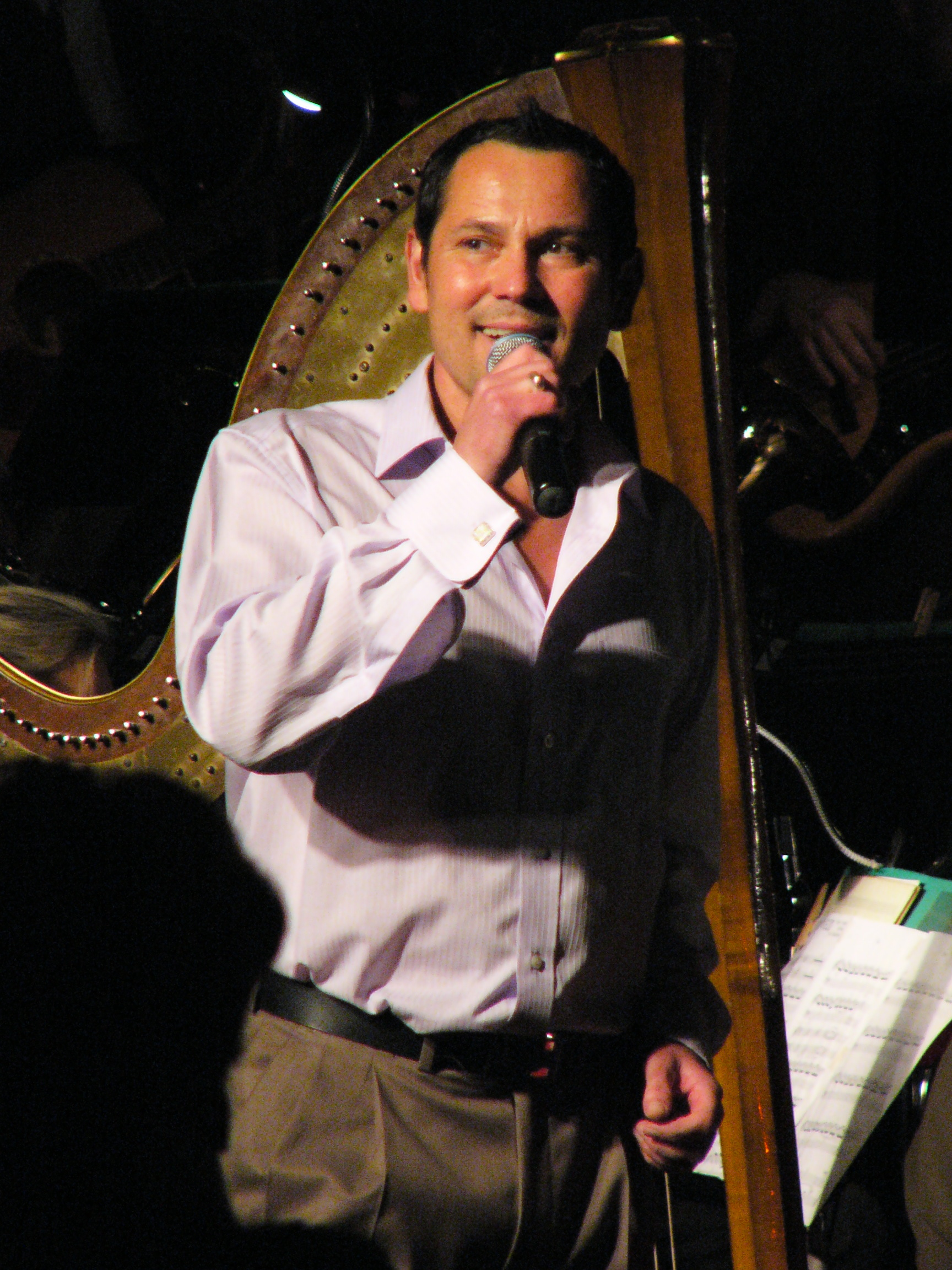
- Pavel Vítek (2008)

Background information
- Born: 30 April 1962 (age 63)
- Genres: Musical theater; pop
- Occupations: Singer, actor
- Website: www.pavelvitek.cz

Pavel Vítek (born 30 September 1962) is a Czech singer and actor.

He performed in the musicals Les Misérables (as Marius), Miss Saigon (as John), Grease (as Teen Angel), and in the play Romeo and Juliet (as Mercutio).

He is also a pop star in the Czech Republic with eight albums, five top ten hits, and two number one hits.

Vitek is the first celebrity in the Czech Republic to publicly disclose his homosexuality to a newspaper (October, 2000). In July 2006, he married his long-time boyfriend Janis Sidovský in a Civil Partnership ceremony in Karlštejn Castle near Prague.
