= Black Star Square =

Square in Ghana

- Independence Square
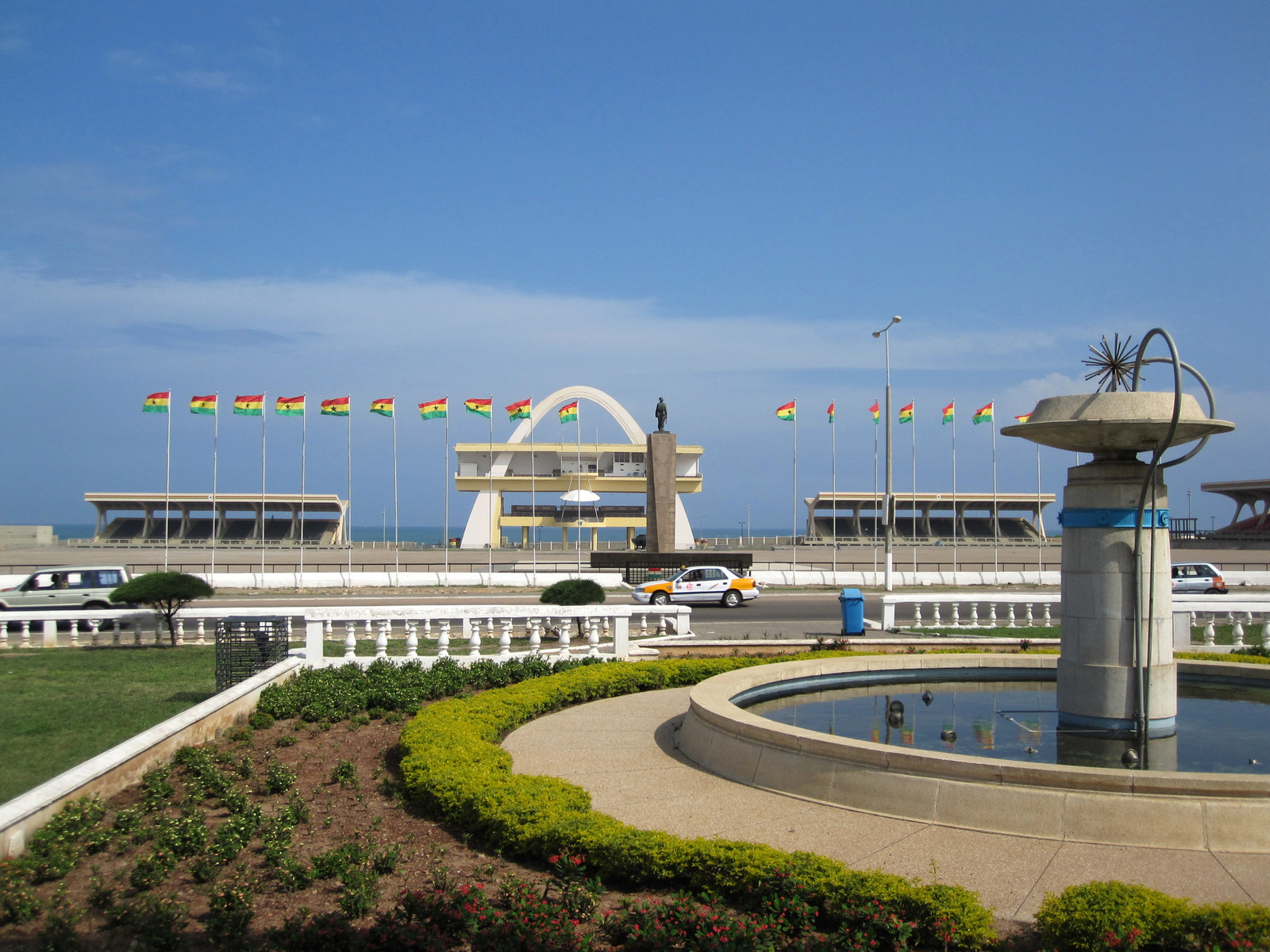
- Aerial view of Black Star Square in Accra, Ghana
- Interactive map of Black Star Square
- Location: Independence Avenue, Accra, Greater Accra Region, Ghana
- Coordinates: 5.5476°N 0.1926°W
- Designer: Theo Lawson (commissioned by Kwame Nkrumah)
- Type: Public square / national monument
- Material: Concrete and stone
- Dedicated to: Ghanaian independence

Black Star Square, also known as Independence Square, is a public square in Accra, Ghana, bordered by the Accra Sports Stadium and the Kwame Nkrumah Memorial Park. The square often hosts the annual independence celebrations as well as other national events, and is the site for all civic and military parades and other national gatherings. It was completed in 1961, in time for the state visit of Queen Elizabeth II to Ghana.

== History ==
In 1957, Kwame Nkrumah became the first prime minister and president of Gold Coast, now Ghana, after gaining independence from the British. Kwame Nkrumah commissioned the construction of the square to celebrate the nation's independence. The square was designed by a renowned Ghanaian architect Theo Lawson. The construction of the square coincided with the visit of Queen Elizabeth II. Construction ended in 1961, and it was named Black Star Square. Kwame Nkrumah was the one who led Ghana, formerly Gold Coast, to gain independence from Britain.

== Importance ==
Black Star Square is a site for Ghana's Independence Day parade, which falls on 6 March every year. A particularly notable parade was the Golden Jubilee, which was Ghana's 50th anniversary of independence from British colonial rule. The Golden Jubilee celebration occurred on March 6, 2007, and it was led by President John Kuffour. It also hosts all major national public gatherings and national festivals.

== Structure ==
In Independence Square there are stands that can seat 30,000 people. The square boasts three monuments that encapsulate the fight for independence and liberation. This includes the Independence Arch, the Liberation Day Monument, and the Black Star Gate, also known as the Black Star Monument. Also the origin of the blackstar signifying black hope was brought to light by doctor Kwame Nkrumah due to Marcus Garvey's shipping line known as the black star line. A statue of a soldier facing the Independence Arch symbolizes the Ghanaians who lost their lives fighting for Ghana's independence.

== Major events ==
The state funerals for presidents John Atta Mills and Jerry Rawlings, and for vice-president Aliu Mahama, were held at the square. On March 24, 1998, over 500,000 people gathered at the square to welcome former U.S. President Bill Clinton and First Lady Hillary Clinton. This was the first visit to Ghana by a U.S. president.

== Gallery ==
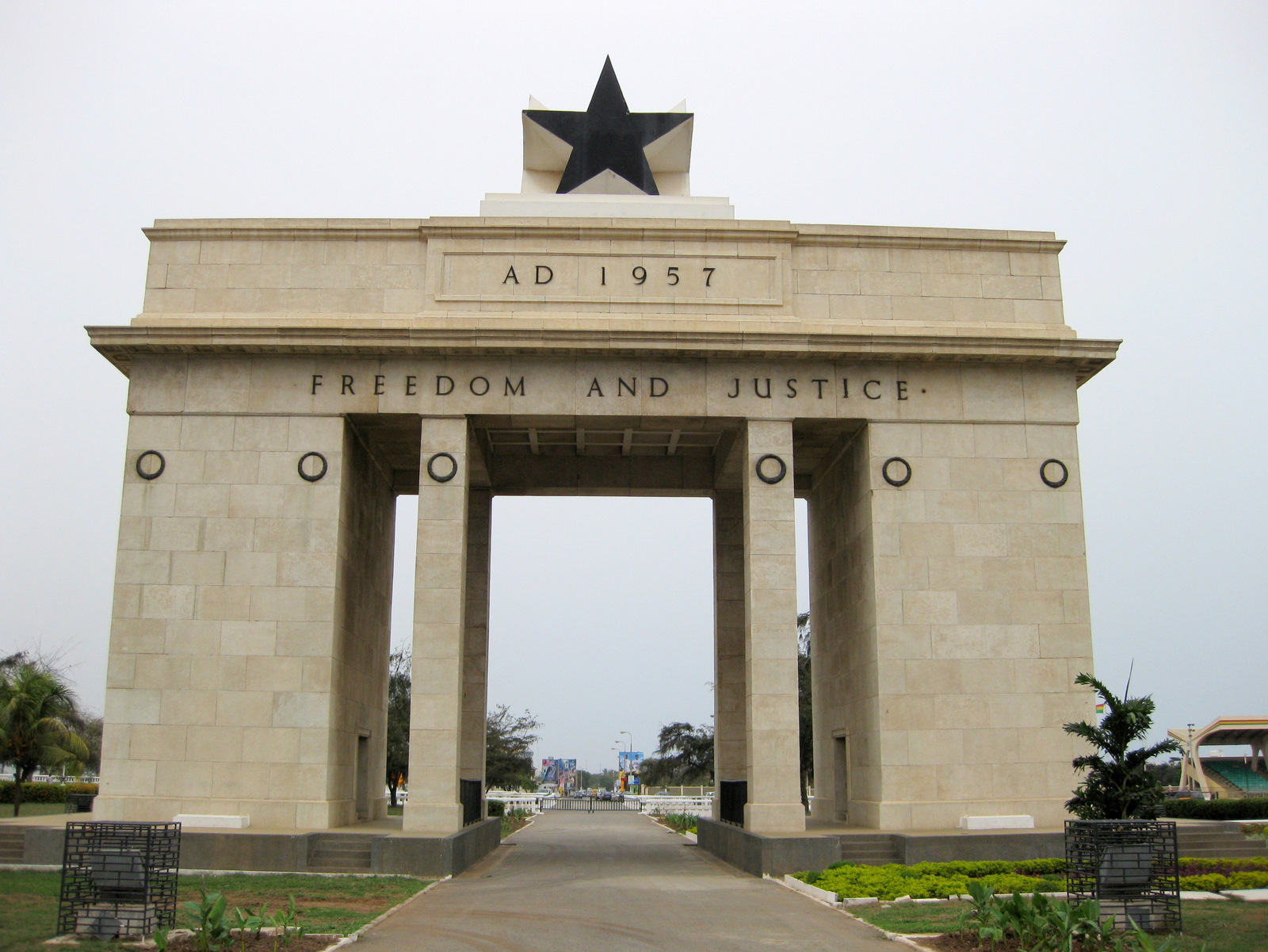
Front view of the Black Star Gate monument at Black Star Square

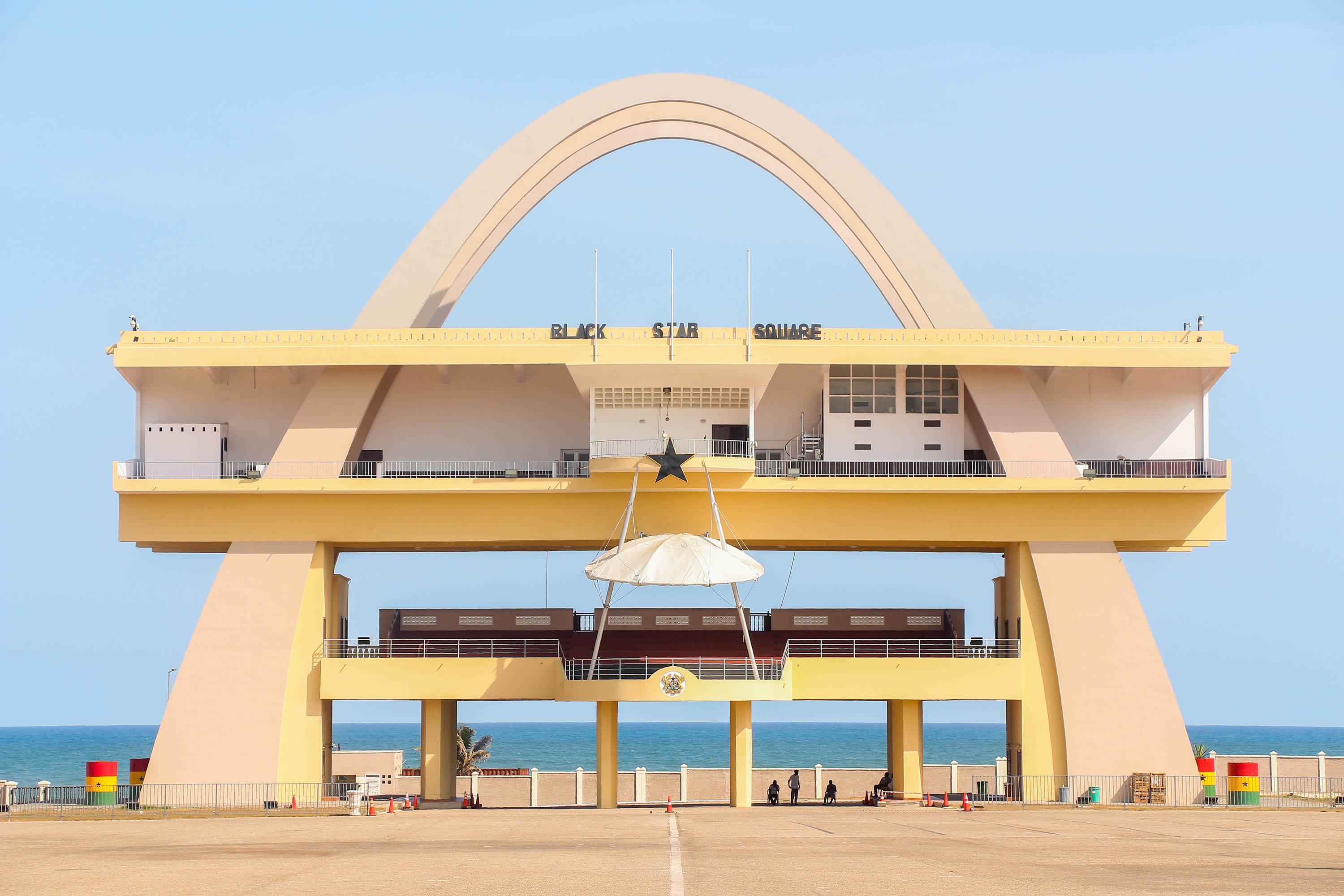
Wide view of Black Star Square showing the plaza and monuments

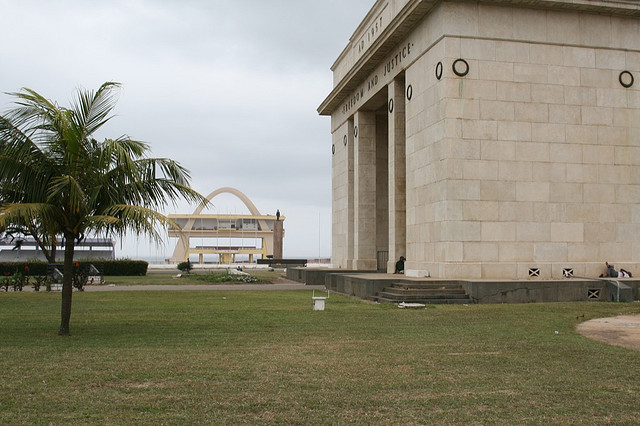
View of Independence Arch with Black Star Square in the foreground

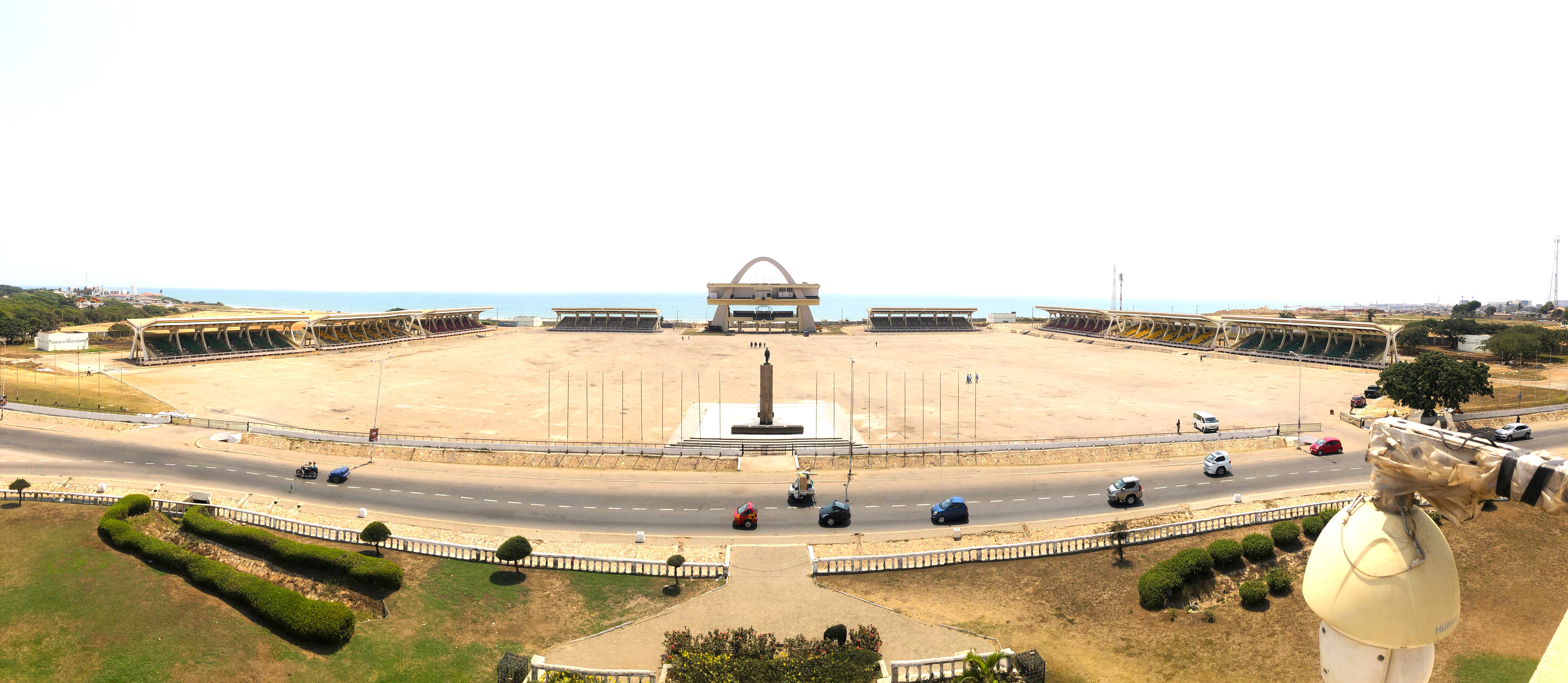
Another perspective of Black Star Square, Accra

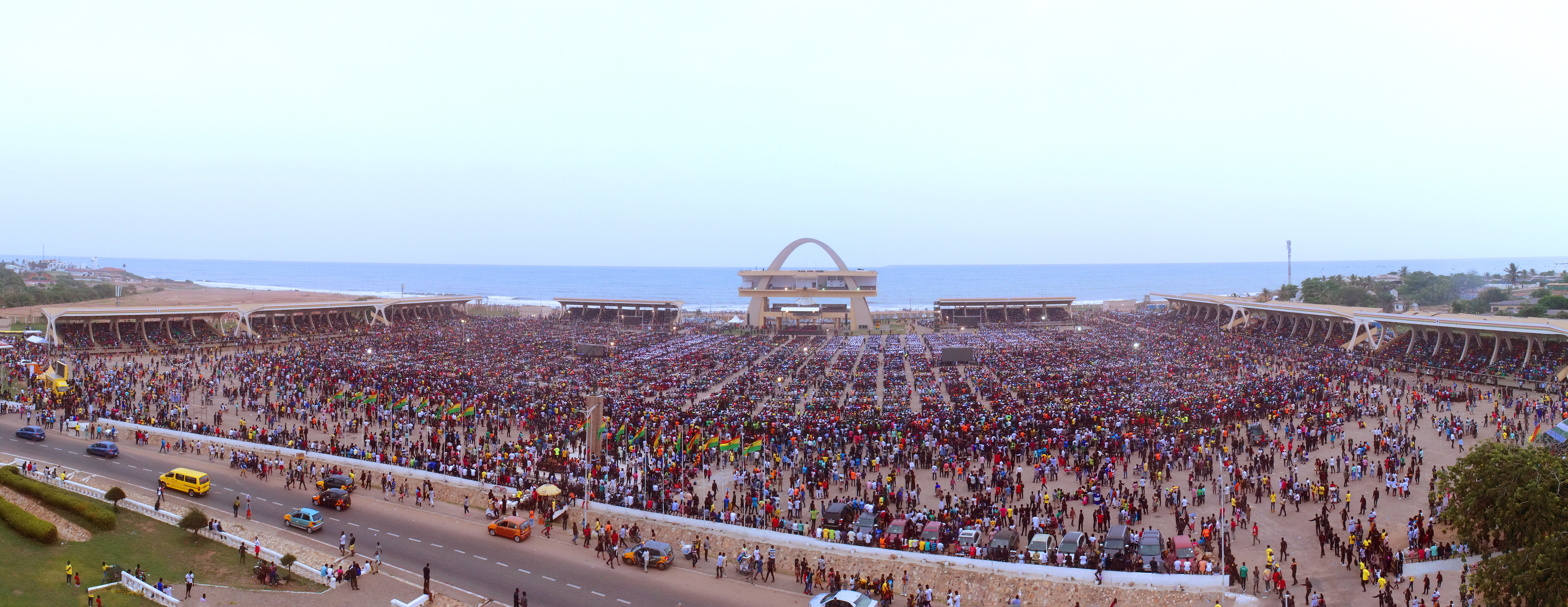
People gathered at Black Star Square, Accra
