= Agnes Oforiwa Tagoe-Quarcoopome =

Ghanaian trader

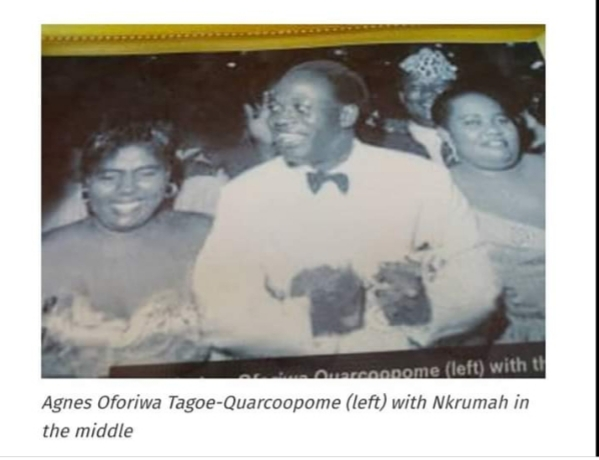
- Agnes Oforiwa Tagoe-Quarcopoome with Dr. Kwame Nkrumah
- Born: 27 May 1913; Ghana
- Died: 7 July 1997 (aged 84)
- Occupation: Trader
- Parent(s): George Aryeequayefio Tagoe and Madam Okaikai Aryee

Agnes Oforiwa Tagoe-Quarcoopome (27 May 1913 – 7 July 1997), also known as Auntie Oforiwa, was one of the women who supported Kwame Nkrumah in the fight for Ghanaian independence. She was also a market queen.

== Early life ==
Agnes was born on 27 May 1913 to George Aryeequayefio Tagoe and Madam Okaikai Aryee. Due to financial problems, she could not continue her education, despite being an intelligent student.

== Career ==
Between 1921 and 1929, she ventured into the buying and selling business and later owned shops in Makola and Okaishie in Accra, a vital business centre in Ghana. By 1940, she had become one of Ghana's renowned market women who was greatly revered by all. She worked hard and became the first Makola woman to open an account with the then Standard Bank of West Africa (now Standard Chartered Bank), although in those days the rich Makola women customarily saved their earnings at home in safes. Through her efforts other market women and businessmen gained the trust to also save their earnings with the bank and opened accounts there.

Apart from doing business, Agnes was a devout Christian and activist. She was also a staunch member of the Convention People's Party (CPP) and supported Kwame Nkrumah by organizing the Makola Women Association, generating substantial funds for Nkrumah's campaign in the fight for independence. She became close friends with Nkrumah when he had to stay with her for a short time after his arrival from the UK to join the United Gold Coast Convention (UGCC) as General Secretary.

In 1949 after the CPP was established, Agnes single-handedly mobilized the support of the market women for Kwame Nkrumah during his campaign and got them to finance his activities. She organised several meetings at the market places for Nkrumah to speak with the market women. She used her connection in the society to help Kwame Nkrumah raise funds. She being a market woman made her popular and influential. She became a vital member of the trade union groups and was the main reason for the ongoing trade between Britain and Ghana.

In 1964, she built a very expensive house in Kokomlemle, furnished fully with air-conditioning, and rented it to the Nkrumah Government to be used as the official residence of Russians officials until Nkrumah was overthrown in the 1966 coup d'état. After Nkrumah was overthrown, Agnes was taken into custody on orders from Lieutenant Arthur. She was forced outside her home by more than 50 armed soldiers in the middle of the night. It was until Lieutenant Arthur was executed in 1967, that Agnes was released by Lieutenant General Joseph Arthur Ankrah and she returned to her business.

By the 1970s, she had become very wealthy and purchased several properties in London, which she rented out.

== Awards ==
In 1958 Agnes was awarded a travelling scholarship by the United Africa Company (UAC), a British company that mainly traded in West Africa. She became the first Ghanaian trader to visit the UAC head offices in the UK and the Netherlands. She imported a variety of products to Ghana in huge quantities, aside from her main product, which was textiles. She continued to fund and support the CPP and Kwame Nkrumah, together with the market women.
