= Black Star Gate =

Monument in Ghana

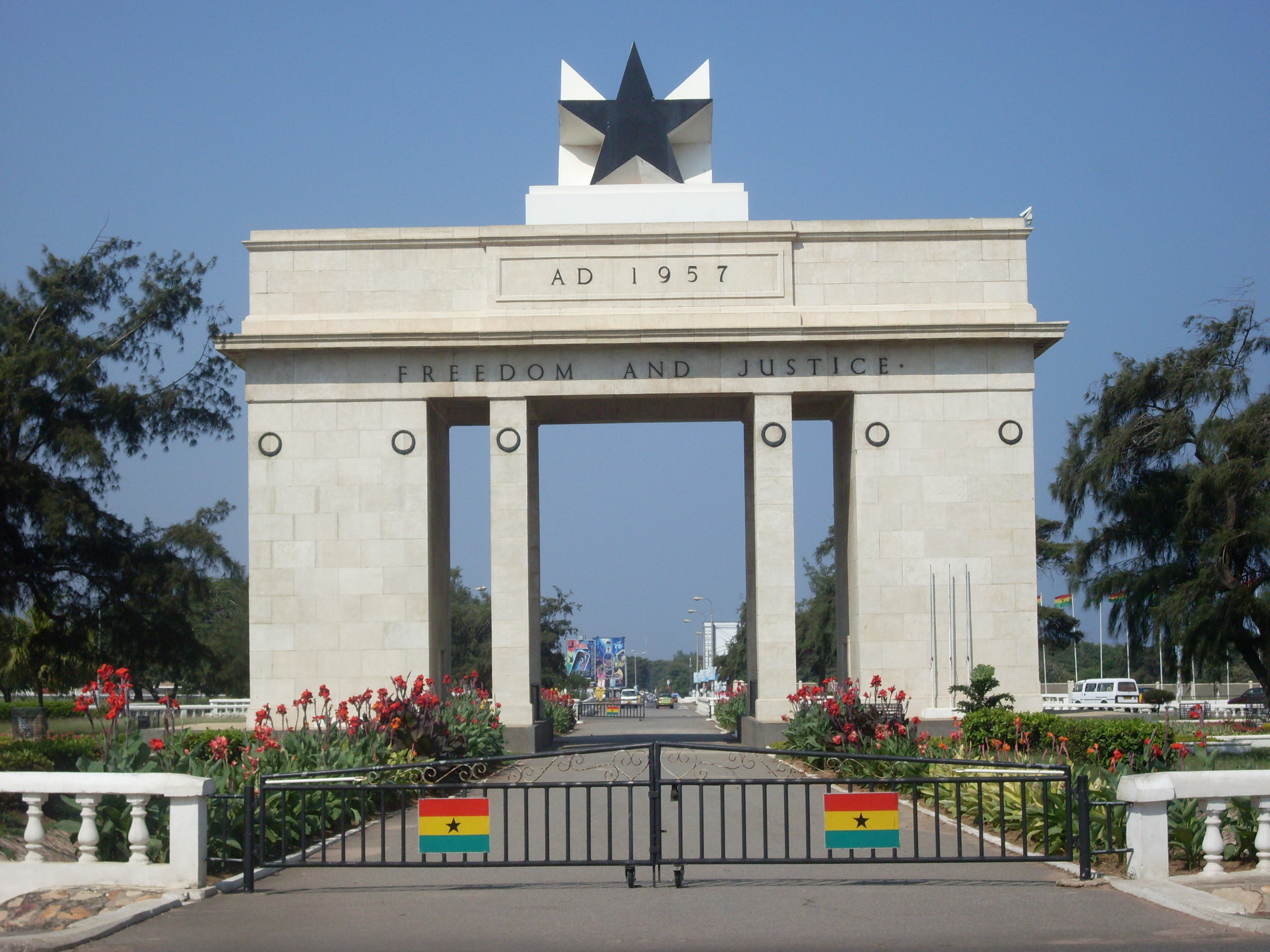
- The Black Star Gate in Accra, Ghana
- Interactive map of Black Star Gate
- Location: Independence Square (Black Star Square), Accra, Ghana
- Coordinates: 5.54901°N 0.19286°W
- Designer: Kwame Nkrumah (commissioned)
- Type: Monument / triumphal arch
- Material: Concrete and metal
- Height: Approx. 40 ft (12 m)
- Dedicated to: Ghanaian independence

The Black Star Gate is a monument located in Accra, Ghana, at the center of Black Star Square (formerly Independence Square). The gate is topped with the Black Star of Africa, a five-pointed star that symbolizes Africa in general and the independence and sovereignty of Ghana in particular.

== History ==
The Black Star Gate was commissioned by Kwame Nkrumah, the first president of Ghana, to symbolize the country's supreme power to control its own affairs following independence from British colonial rule in 1957.

=== Significance ===
It appears on national currency, including the reverse of the 2002 10,000 cedis note.

== Gallery ==
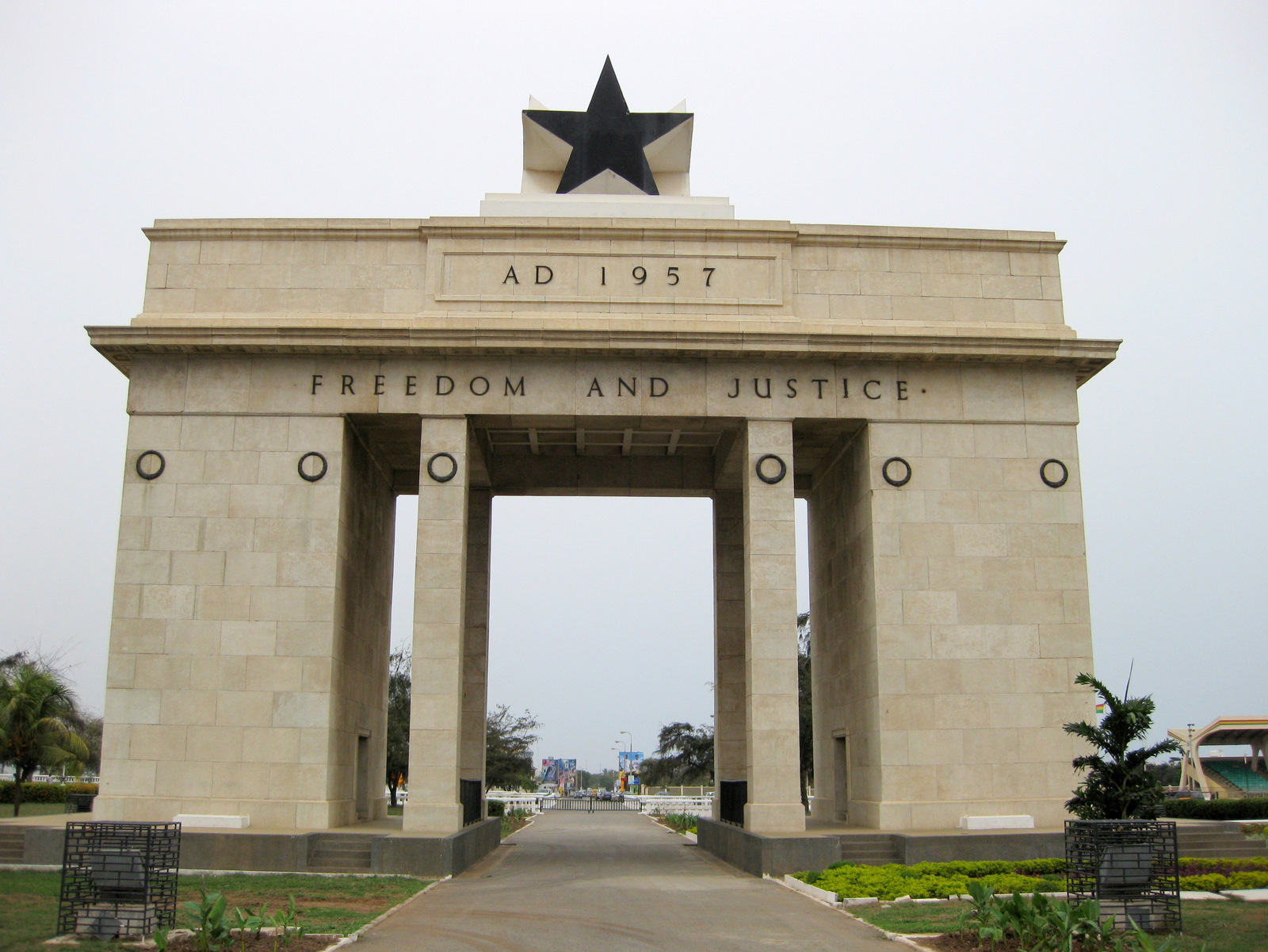
Front view of the Black Star Gate with "Freedom and Justice" inscription

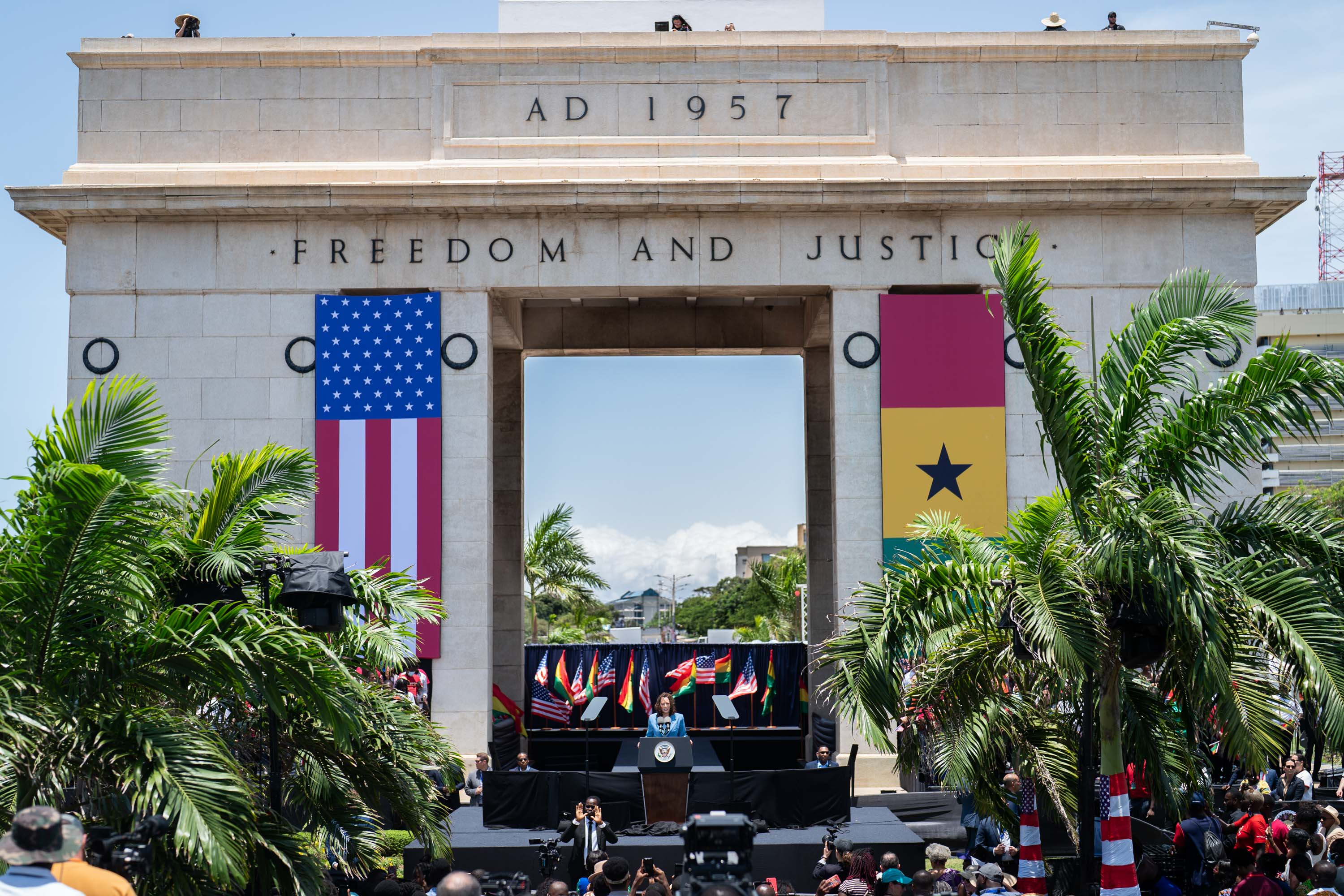
US Vice President Harris delivers remarks at the Black Star Gate, 2023

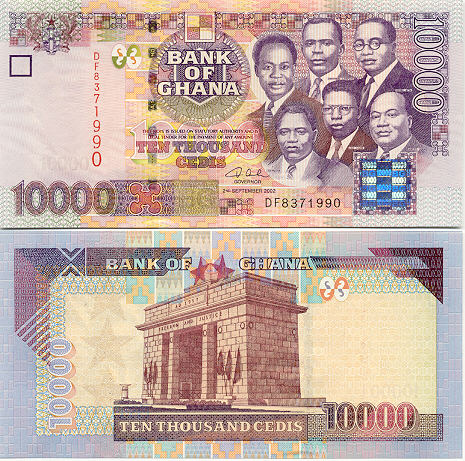
Black Star Gate on the reverse of a 2002 10,000 Cedis banknote
