= Janis Sidovský =

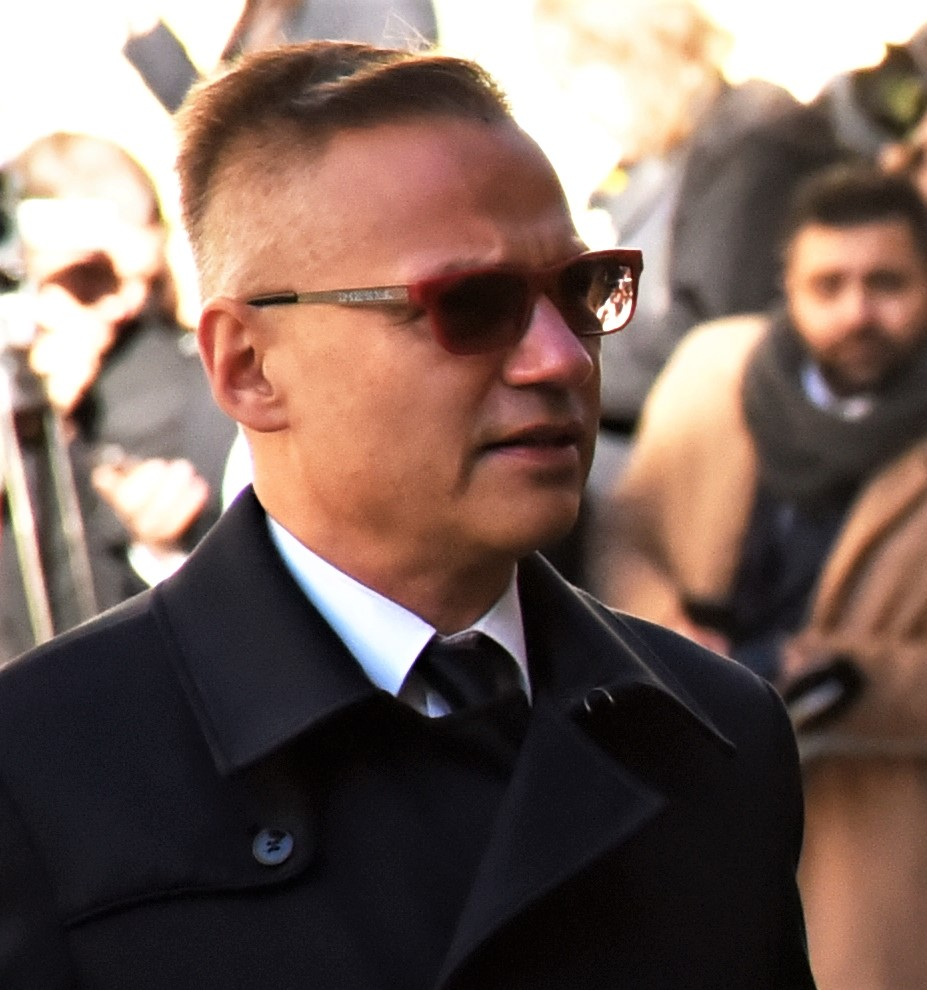
Janis Sidovský

Janis Sidovský (born 21 January 1968 in Pardubice) is a Czech producer, manager and publicity supervisor. He has been awarded 3 Platinum records, his theatre production "Night on Karlštejn" was nominated on the Czech Theatre Award Thalie (2017).

== Career ==
Sidovský is the leading representative of PR in show business. Created a campaign for the Czech versions of the world's musical Les Misérables, Mamma Mia!, Miss Saigon, Rocky and Grease, he also participated in domestic theatre projects such as Cleopatra, Dracula and Rebels. He lectures on public relations in culture at universities.

As a producer and author, he created a 13-part series of the TV show "Queens of Pop", which is one of the most successful TV events in the Czech Republic. He was the producer of the special event Tribute to President Václav Havel in the Prague National Theatre during 2003, as well many charity concerts, pop stars tours and theatre performances. His theatre production "Night on Karlštejn" with music from Karel Svoboda is successfully presented for the fourth season at Karlštejn Castle (from summer 2016).

He was a member of the marketing board at the Prague National Theatre, and has co-operated with the charity foundation Vize 97 of Dagmar a Václav Havel and Kapka naděje. Now, he is a member of the Czech Academy of Popular Music. Between 2008 and 2012, he worked as a marketing and program director of Czech digital television TV Barrandov. He was also Vice-Chairman. During the period of his leadership of the station became the fourth most watched TV in the country.

In 2017, he was chairman of the Czech jury of Eurovision. In February 2019 Germany elected him as a member of The International Expert Jury Of the national finale Eurovision "Unser Lied für Israel".

He is currently the speaker of The Czech National Symphony Orchestra and Prague Proms Music Festival.

== Personal life ==
Sidovský and his life partner Pavel Vítek were the first gay Czech couple to announce their marriage after the Czech Republic legalised same-sex civil unions in 2006. He supported the Czech minority LGBT several financial gift, especially at an auction of artworks in a charity project Art For Life.
