= Linda Zervakis =

German-Greek television presenter (born 1975)

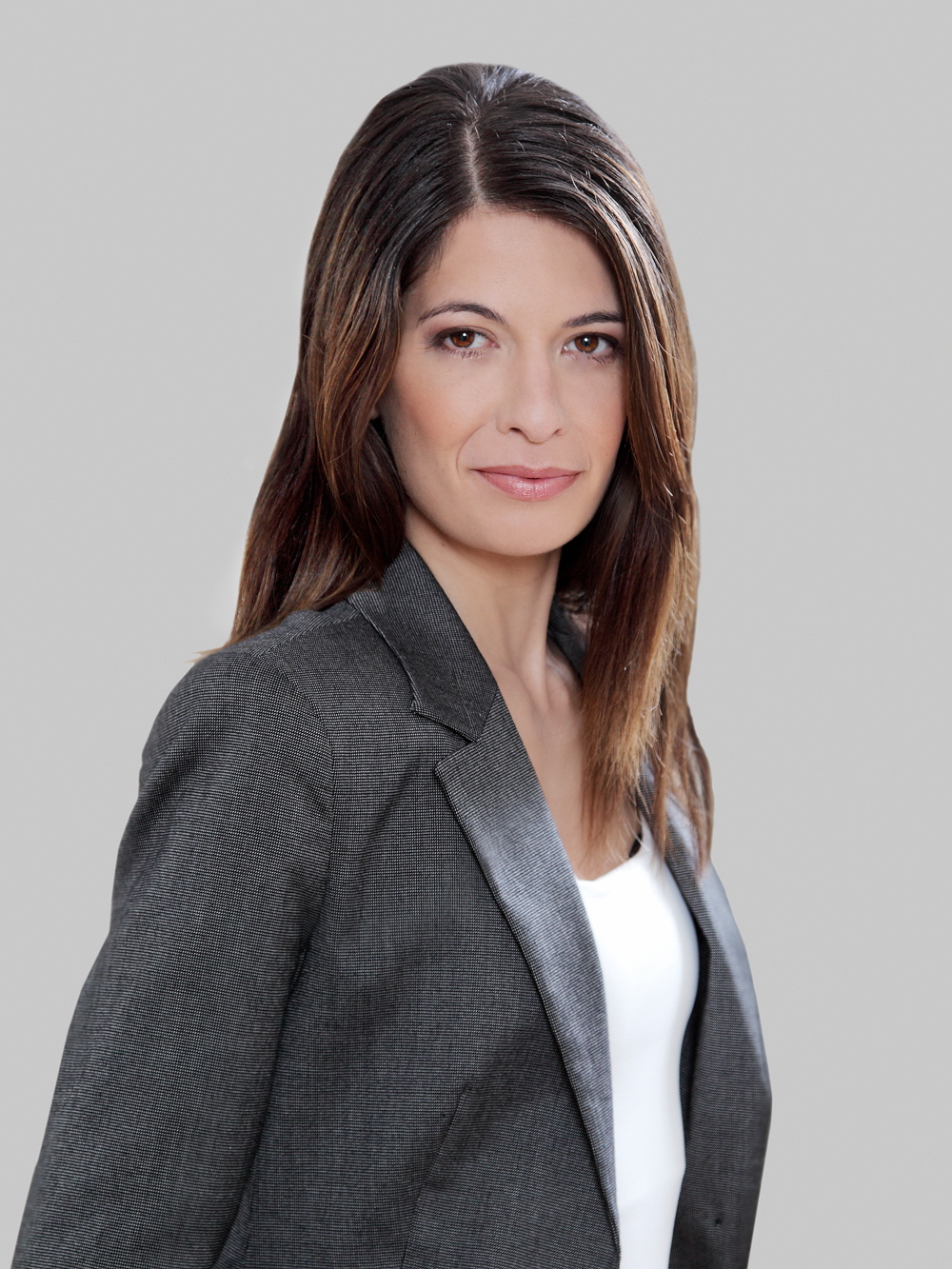
- Born: 25 July 1975; Hamburg
- Website: www.lindazervakis.de

Linda Zervakis (Greek: Λίντα Ζερβάκη; born 25 July 1975 in Hamburg) is a German-Greek television presenter as well as newsreader and journalist. She was the first Tagesschau presenter with an immigrant background.

== Early life and education ==
Zervakis is the daughter of Greek immigrant guest workers in Harburg, Hamburg, where she attended the Friedrich-Ebert-Gymnasium until 1994. Her father ran a kiosk in Harburg. Following her father's death, Zervakis and her brothers had to help their mother by working in the kiosk while they were still children. Until the age of 28, Zervakis worked on Sundays in the kiosk.

== Career ==
After graduation in 1994, Zervakis interned at the advertising agency BBDO, where she was then employed as a copywriter. Later, she worked as a volunteer and editor at various radio and television production companies.

=== NDR ===
In 2001, Zervakis moved to NDR. There she was first employed as a newsreader and editor of the radio program N-JOY, beginning in 2004. She was also a news anchor and reporter for the Schleswig-Holstein Magazin and the Schleswig-Holstein 18 o'clock broadcast. Since 2006, Zervakis moderates the Tagesschau news on tagesschau24. From 2008 to 2010, she was an external reporter on the NDR program My Afternoon.

From February 2009, Zervakis regularly filled in for Gabi Bauer and Ingo Zamperoni in the Nachtmagazin. In February 2010, she became the female speaker for the Tagesschau. From July 2011 to September 2011, Zervakis also appeared together with Simon Beeck in the afternoon program of 1 Live as a holiday replacement.

On 17 May 2013, Zervakis replaced Marc Bator and became one of the anchors of Tagesschau at 8pm. Alongside Barbara Schöneberger, she moderated the Global Citizen Festival ahead of the 2017 G20 Hamburg summit, with Justin Trudeau, Olaf Scholz and others.

=== ProSieben ===
In 2021, Zervakis moved to ProSieben. Alongside Claudia von Brauchitsch, she moderated one of three TV election debates between the three candidates to succeed Chancellor Angela Merkel – Annalena Baerbock, Armin Laschet and Olaf Scholz – ahead of the 2021 elections, which was aired live on both RTL, Sat.1 and kabel eins during prime-time.

== Filmography ==
Year	Title	Role
2017	Sharknado 5: Global Swarming	News Anchor Woman

== Memoir ==
- Zervakis, Linda (2015). Königin der bunten Tüte Geschichten aus dem Kiosk (in German). Reinbek bei Hamburg: Rowohlt Polaris. ISBN 978-3-499-63080-4. OCLC 935764824.
