= Liberation Day Monument =

Coordinates: 5.55°N 0.19°W

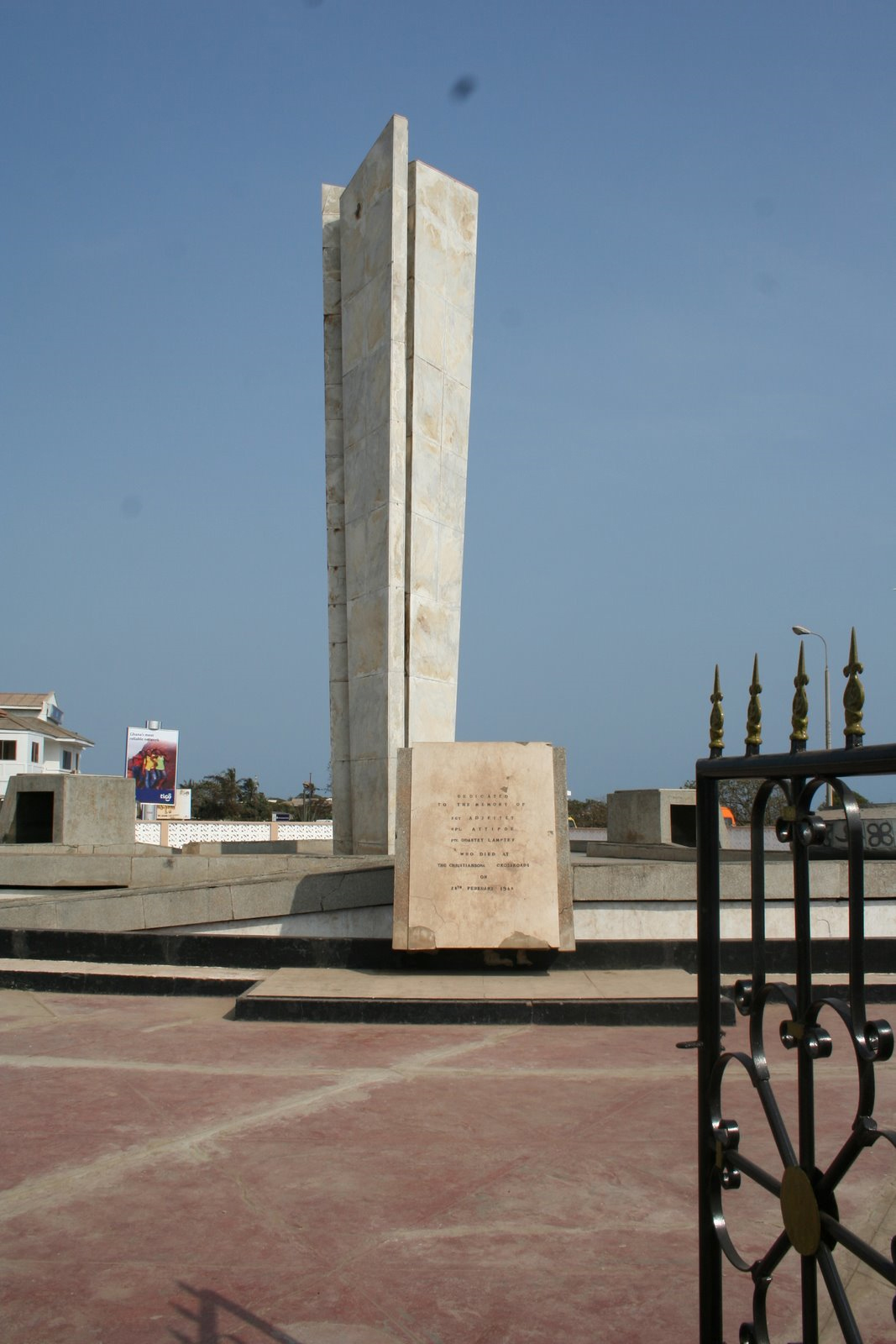

Liberation Day monument is a monument in Accra, Ghana. It stands in honour of several veterans of the Burma campaign conducted during the Second World War by Commonwealth forces in which the veterans fought for the British Empire. After returning to the Gold Coast, some of the veterans began a peaceful protest and marched towards Christiansborg Castle. The protesters were fired upon, and seven of the veterans were killed.

Liberation Day monument

Inscription on monument
