= Barbara Schöneberger =

German TV presenter and entertainer

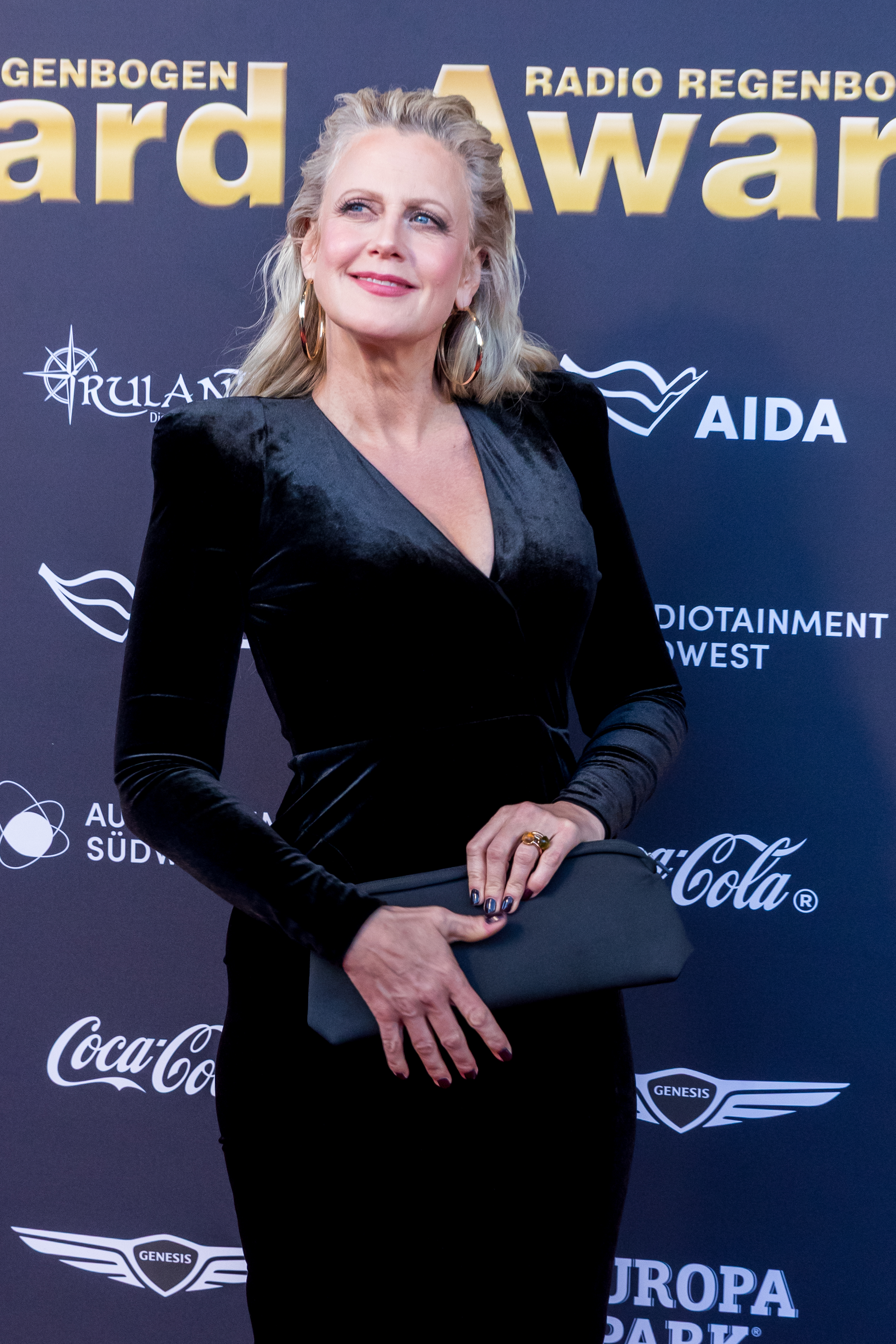
- Schöneberger in 2025
- Born: 5 March 1974 (age 52); Munich, West Germany
- Occupations: TV presenter, comedian, actress, singer
- Years active: 1998–present
- Spouse: Maximilian von Schierstädt (m. 2009)
- Children: 2

Barbara von Schierstädt (née Schöneberger, IPA: [ˈbaʁbaʁa ˈʃøːnəˌbɛʁɡɐ]; born 5 March 1974) is a German television presenter, entertainer, talk show host, actress and singer.

== Early life ==
Schöneberger is the only child of clarinet player Hans Schöneberger and his wife Annemarie. She studied sociology, art history and communication studies in Augsburg.

== Career ==
=== Television ===
Since 1999, Schöneberger has hosted several shows on German television, including Die Schöneberger Show and Blondes Gift ("Blond Poison"), for which she received a Grimme Award nomination. She has also acted in a number of TV movies and hosted such award ceremonies as the Echo Award 2009.

Schöneberger was Germany's spokesperson for the Eurovision Song Contest 2015, held in Vienna, and for the 2016 contest, which was held in Stockholm – having earlier also presented Unser Lied für Stockholm ("Our Song for Stockholm"), at which the German entry for the contest was chosen. Schöneberger was again the German spokesperson for the 2017 contest in Kyiv, for the 2018 contest in Lisbon, for the 2019 contest in Tel Aviv, for the 2021 contest in Rotterdam and for the 2022 contest in Turin; she has also hosted all the German national finals held since 2014 (except in 2018).

=== Music ===
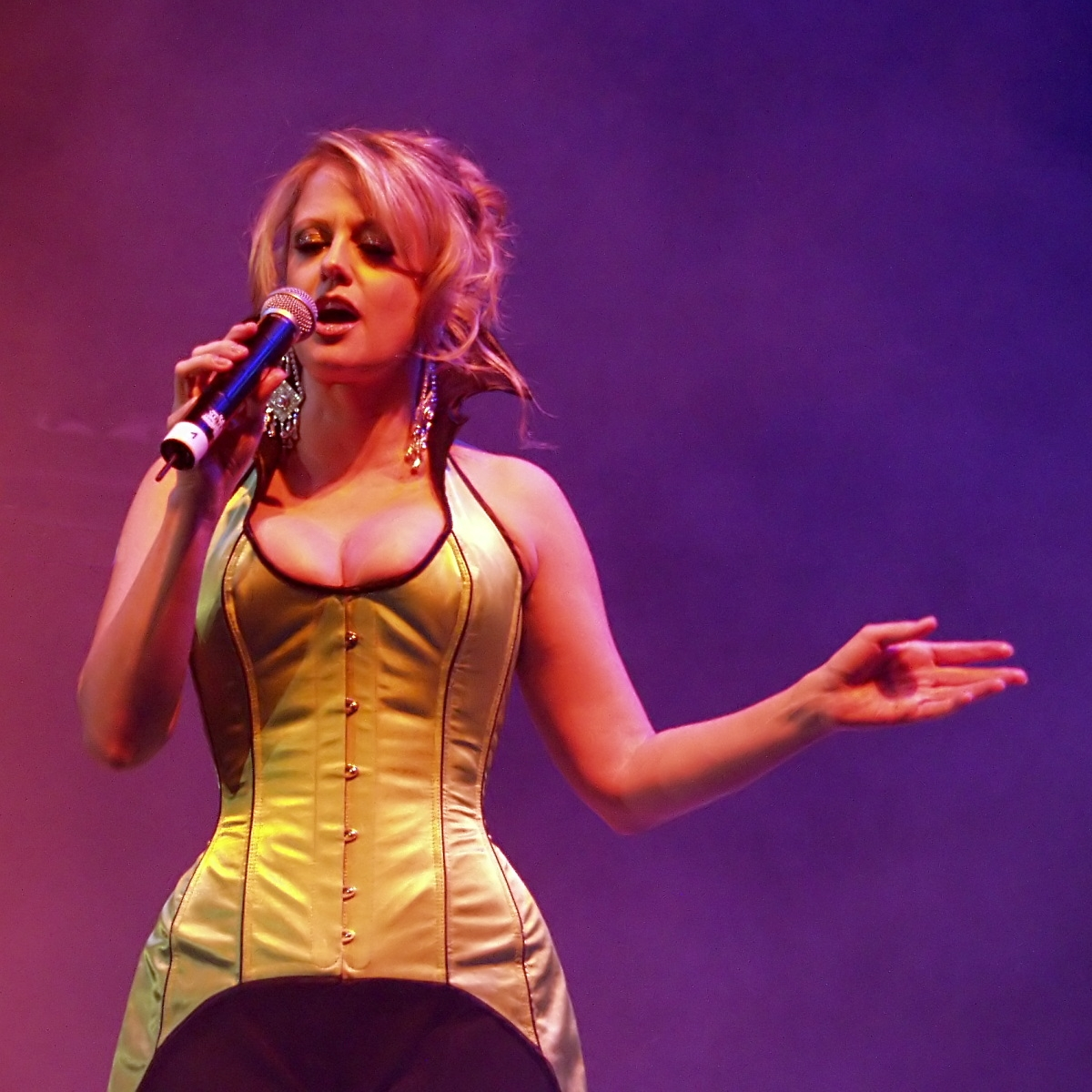
Schöneberger performing in 2007

In 2007, Schöneberger released her first studio album, Jetzt singt sie auch noch! ("Now she's singing too!"). Her second album, Nochmal, nur anders ("Again, only different"), followed in 2009. In 2014 she announced her first tour in Germany. On 25 October 2013, Schöneberger's third album, Bekannt aus Funk und Fernsehen ("Known from radio and television"), was released, which thematically revolves around her life between a television woman and a housewife, and which she also presented on stage in 2014.

On 11 May 2018, Schöneberger's fourth album Eine Frau gibt Auskunft ("A woman gives information") was released, which thematically deals with different perspectives of women in each song and pokes fun at the men's world critically, but with a wink.

=== Radio ===
In October 2018, a 24-hour radio program focused on her started, Barba Radio.

== Personal life ==
Schöneberger lives in Berlin with her second husband Maximilian von Schierstädt and has a son and a daughter. She volunteers for the German bone marrow donor database and has been moderating the DKMS-Dreamball several times. In 2009, she was awarded the Douglas Hope Carrier Prize for her commitment. She is also, together with her TV presenter colleague Oliver Welke, long-time ambassador for the international children's aid organization Terre des hommes.

== Discography ==
=== Studio albums ===
List of albums, with selected chart positions and certifications
| Title | Album details | Peak chart positions | | |
| Title | Album details | GER | AUT | SWI |
|---|---|---|---|---|
| Jetzt singt sie auch noch | Released: 2 November 2007; Label: Polydor; Formats: CD, digital download | 28 | — | — |
| Nochmal, nur anders | Released: 25 September 2009; Label: Polydor; Formats: CD, digital download | 43 | — | — |
| Bekannt aus Funk und Fernsehen | Released: 25 October 2013; Label: Polydor; Formats: CD, digital download | 52 | — | — |
| Eine Frau gibt Auskunft | Released: 11 May 2018; Label: Polydor; Formats: CD, digital download | 15 | 72 | — |

== Honors ==
- 2002: Nomination for the German Television Award (Deutscher Fernsehpreis)
- 2003: Nomination for the Adolf Grimme Prize in the "entertainment / special" category for "the independent, playful handling of the conventions of a talk show in the Blondes Gift series "
- 2007: German Comedy Award as a member of the Frei Schnauze XXL ensemble (Best Comedy Show)
- 2015: Federal Cross of Merit on the ribbon of the Order of Merit of the Federal Republic of Germany for the commitment as an ambassador for the relief organization terre des hommes for the rights of children in need
- 2016: German Television Award for the moderation of Die 2 - Gottschalk & Jauch against ALL
- 2016: Romy in the "Show / Entertainment" category
- 2016: Goldene Henne in the category "audience award entertainment"
- 2019: Horizont Award for "Woman of the Year" in the "Media" category
