= Ghana at the 2025 World Aquatics Championships =

- Flag of Ghana
- World Aquatics code: GHA
- National federation: Ghana Swimming Association

in Singapore
- Competitors: 4 in 1 sport
- Medals: Gold 0 Silver 0 Bronze 0 Total 0

World Aquatics Championships appearances
- 1973; 1975; 1978; 1982; 1986; 1991; 1994; 1998; 2001; 2003; 2005; 2007; 2009; 2011; 2013; 2015; 2017; 2019; 2022; 2023; 2024; 2025

Ghana is competing at the 2025 World Aquatics Championships in Singapore from 11 July to 3 August 2025.

== Competitors ==
The following is the list of competitors in the Championships.

Sport	Men	Women	Total
Swimming	2	2	4
Total	2	2	4

== Swimming ==
Men

Athlete	Event	Heat		Semifinal		Final	
Athlete	Event	Time	Rank	Time	Rank	Time	Rank
Harry Stacey	50 m freestyle	23.05	55	Did not advance			
Harry Stacey	100 m freestyle	51.43	59	Did not advance			
Abeku Jackson	50 m butterfly	24.49	50	Did not advance			
Abeku Jackson	100 m butterfly	DQ		Did not advance			

Women

Athlete	Event	Heat		Semifinal		Final	
Athlete	Event	Time	Rank	Time	Rank	Time	Rank
Joselle Mensah	50 m freestyle	26.48	47	Did not advance			
Joselle Mensah	100 m freestyle	58.98	46	Did not advance			
Nubia Adjei	50 m backstroke	32.23	57	Did not advance			
Nubia Adjei	50 m butterfly	28.82	55	Did not advance			

Mixed

Athlete	Event	Heat		Final	
Athlete	Event	Time	Rank	Time	Rank
Nubia Adjei; Abeku Jackson; Joselle Mensah; Harry Stacey	4 × 100 m freestyle relay	DNS		Did not advance	
Nubia Adjei; Abeku Jackson; Joselle Mensah; Harry Stacey	4 × 100 m medley relay	4:13.77	30	Did not advance	
