= Ghana at the 2015 World Aquatics Championships =

- Flag of Ghana
- World Aquatics code: GHA
- National federation: Ghana Swimming Federation

in Kazan, Russia
- Competitors: 4 in 1 sport
- Medals: Gold 0 Silver 0 Bronze 0 Total 0

World Aquatics Championships appearances
- 1973; 1975; 1978; 1982; 1986; 1991; 1994; 1998; 2001; 2003; 2005; 2007; 2009; 2011; 2013; 2015; 2017; 2019; 2022; 2023; 2024; 2025

Ghana competed at the 2015 World Aquatics Championships in Kazan, Russia from 24 July to 9 August 2015.

== Swimming ==
Ghanaian swimmers have achieved qualifying standards in the following events (up to a maximum of 2 swimmers in each event at the A-standard entry time, and 1 at the B-standard):

Men

Athlete	Event	Heat		Semifinal		Final	
Athlete	Event	Time	Rank	Time	Rank	Time	Rank
Abeiku Jackson	50 m freestyle	24.72	70	did not advance			
Abeiku Jackson	50 m butterfly	26.41	55	did not advance			
Kwesi Jackson	100 m freestyle	56.94	98	did not advance			

Women

Athlete	Event	Heat		Semifinal		Final	
Athlete	Event	Time	Rank	Time	Rank	Time	Rank
Natasha Addai	50 m freestyle	41.71	110	did not advance			
Natasha Addai	50 m breaststroke	51.73	70	did not advance			
Kaya Forson	200 m freestyle	2:23.72	61	did not advance			
Kaya Forson	200 m backstroke	2:43.94	44	did not advance			
