= Labadi =

Capital of La Dade-Kotopon Municipality, Ghana

Coordinates: 5°34′00″N 0°09′30″W

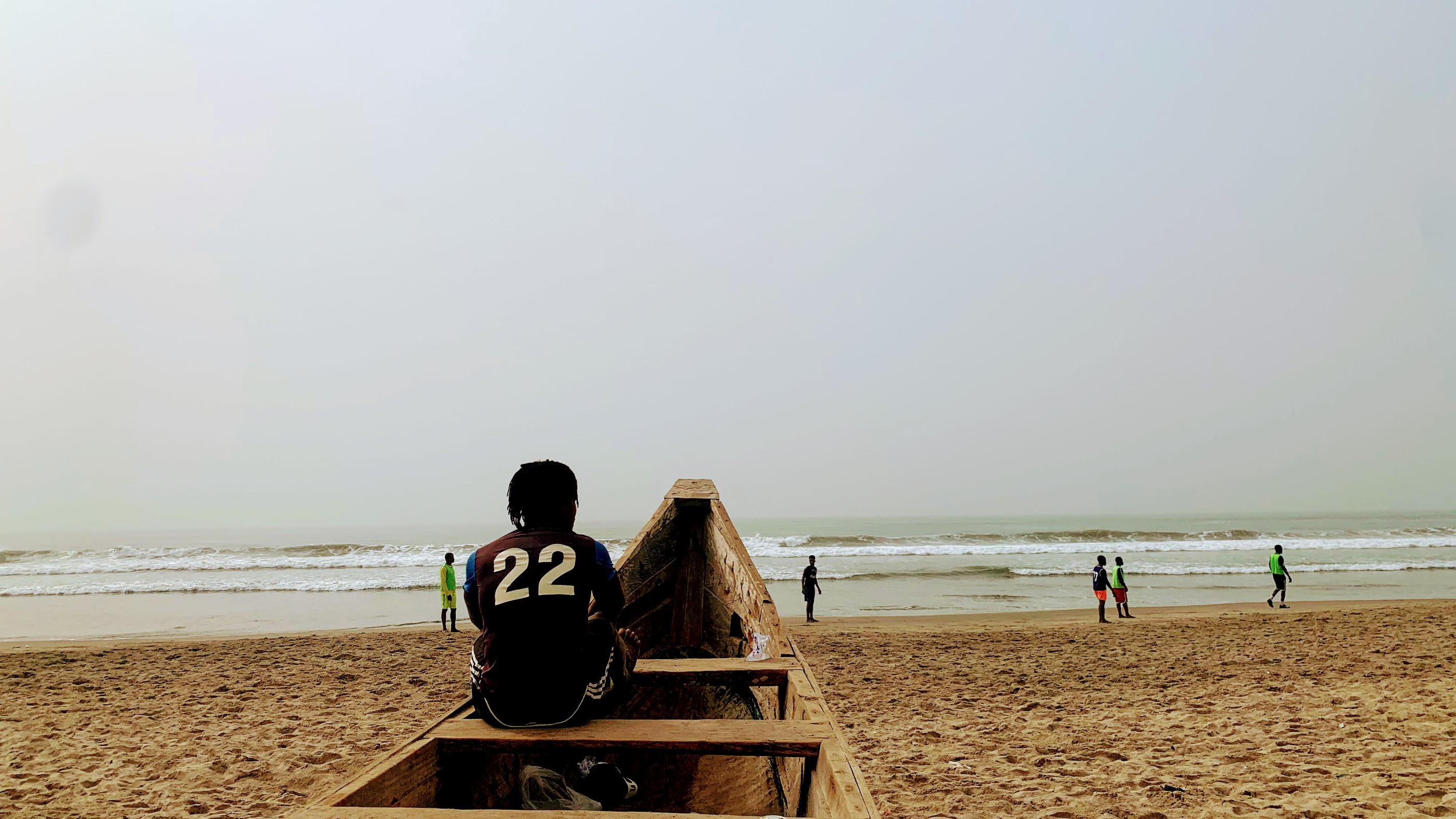
Labadi Beach

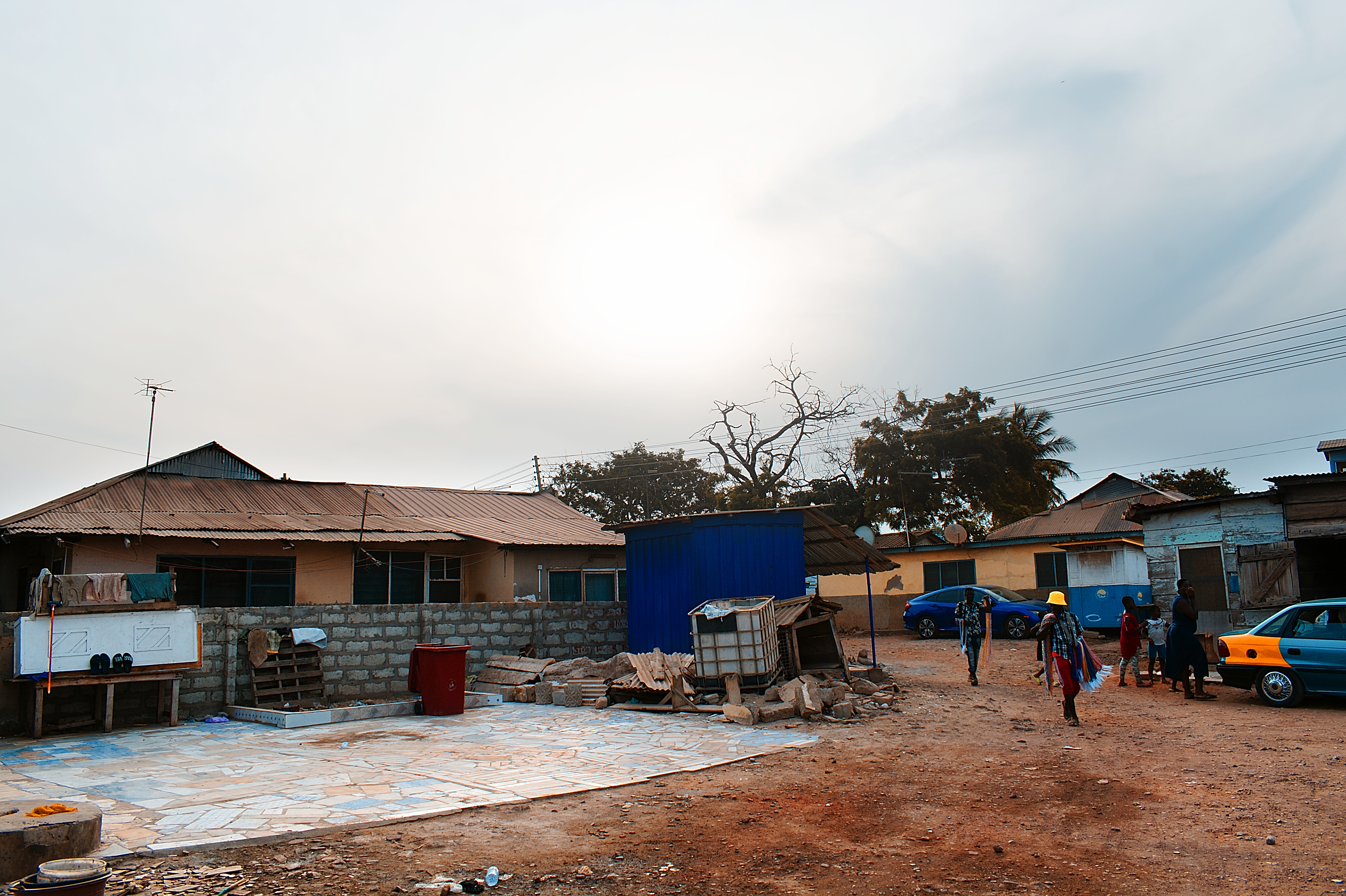
Labadi neighbourhood at sundown.

Labadi, also known as La, is a Peri-urban town in La Dade Kotopon Municipal District in the Greater Accra Region of Ghana.

== Location ==
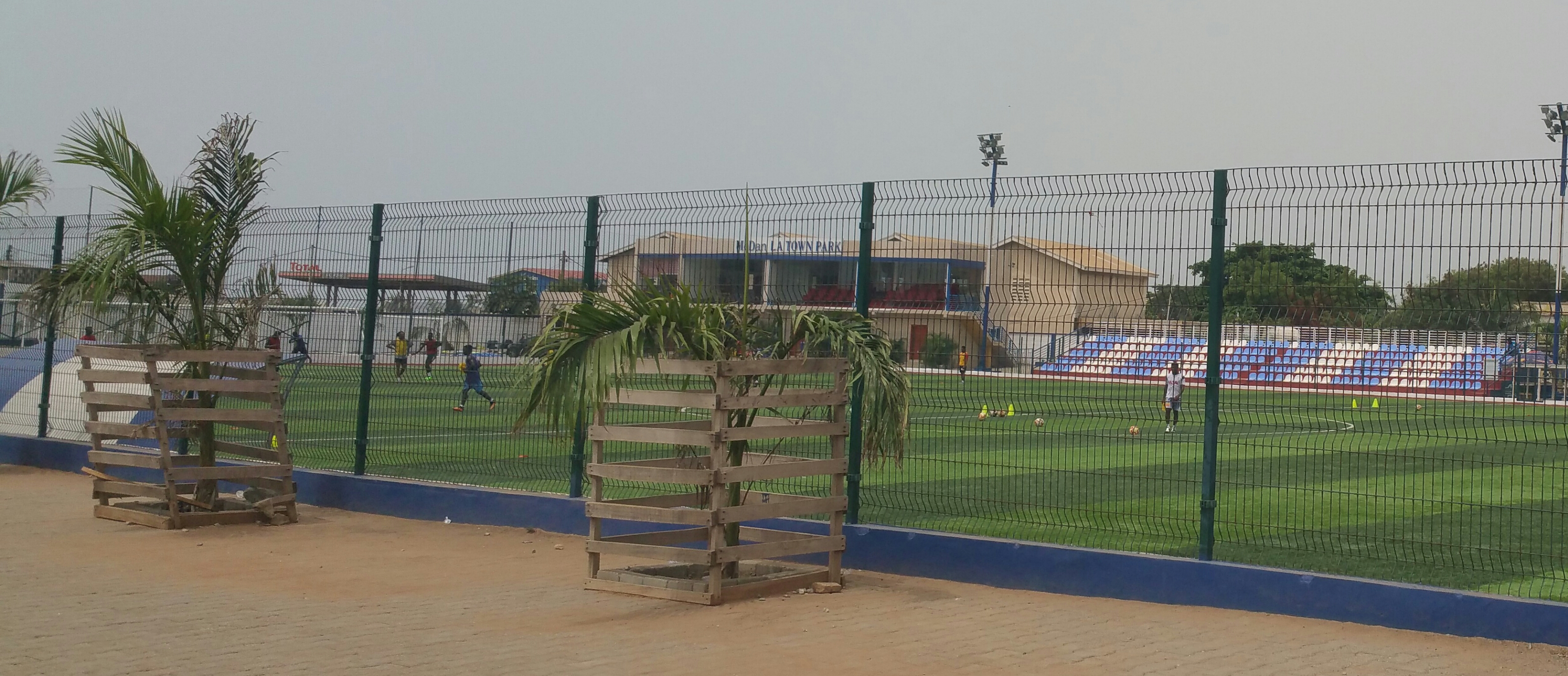
Footballers training at McDan La Town Park.

Labadi is located along the coast of the Atlantic Ocean. Its distance by road from Accra International Airport is 7.11 kilometers (3.04 miles). It is bounded by Osu to the west and Teshie to the east.

== Politics ==
Labadi is in the Dade Kotopon constituency, led by Rita Naa Odoley Sowah of the National Democratic Congress. She succeeded Vincent Sowah Odotei, a member of the New Patriotic Party, who also succeeded Nii Amasah Namoale of the National Democratic Congress.

== Notable Labadians ==
- Rita Naa Odoley Sowah (born 1968), politician, former MCE of La Dade Kotopon Municipal Assembly (LADMA), and member of parliament of La Dade Kotopon Constituency.
- Amon Kotei (1915–2011), commissioned designer of the coat of arms of Ghana.
