= Ghana at the 2019 World Aquatics Championships =

- Flag of Ghana
- FINA code: GHA
- National federation: Ghana Swimming Association

in Gwangju, South Korea
- Competitors: 4 in 1 sport
- Medals: Gold 0 Silver 0 Bronze 0 Total 0

World Aquatics Championships appearances
- 1973; 1975; 1978; 1982; 1986; 1991; 1994; 1998; 2001; 2003; 2005; 2007; 2009; 2011; 2013; 2015; 2017; 2019; 2022; 2023; 2024

Ghana competed at the 2019 World Aquatics Championships in Gwangju, South Korea from 12 to 28 July.

== Swimming ==
Ghana entered four swimmers.

Men

Athlete	Event	Heat		Semifinal		Final	
Athlete	Event	Time	Rank	Time	Rank	Time	Rank
Jason Arthur	50 m backstroke	26.84	51	did not advance			
Jason Arthur	100 m backstroke	56.86	45	did not advance			
Abeiku Jackson	50 m butterfly	24.85	50	did not advance			
Abeiku Jackson	100 m butterfly	54.94	47	did not advance			

Women

Athlete	Event	Heat		Semifinal		Final	
Athlete	Event	Time	Rank	Time	Rank	Time	Rank
Kaya Forson	100 m freestyle	1:00.29	66	did not advance			
Kaya Forson	200 m individual medley	2:34.59	36	did not advance			
Zaira Forson	200 m freestyle	2:18.74	56	did not advance			
Zaira Forson	200 m butterfly	2:39.20	33	did not advance			

Mixed

Athlete	Event	Heat		Final	
Athlete	Event	Time	Rank	Time	Rank
Jason Arthur; Kaya Forson; Abeiku Jackson; Zaira Forson	4×100 m medley relay	4:21.40	31	did not advance	
