= Black Star of Africa =

Symbol of Africa and Ghana

The Black Star of Africa

The Black Star of Africa is a black five-pointed star (★) symbolizing Africa in general and Ghana in particular. The Black Star Line, founded in 1919 by Marcus Garvey as part of the Back-to-Africa movement, modelled its name on that of the White Star Line, changing the colour from white to black to symbolise ownership by black people rather than white people. The black star became a symbol of Pan-Africanism and anti-colonialism. Described as the "Lodestar of African Freedom", the black star was used in 1957 by Theodosia Okoh in the design of the Flag of Ghana.

== Ghana ==
Ghanaians have come to regard the Black Star as a specific symbol of Ghana rather than of Africa in general. As well as on the flag, the star appears on the coat of arms; on the Black Star Gate in Black Star Square in the capital, Accra; and on the Seat of State in Parliament, on which the President sits on ceremonial occasions. The Ghana national football team is nicknamed the "Black Stars". The house flag of Ghana's former national shipping carrier, the Black Star Line, also featured the star.

Flag of Ghana

Coat of arms of Ghana

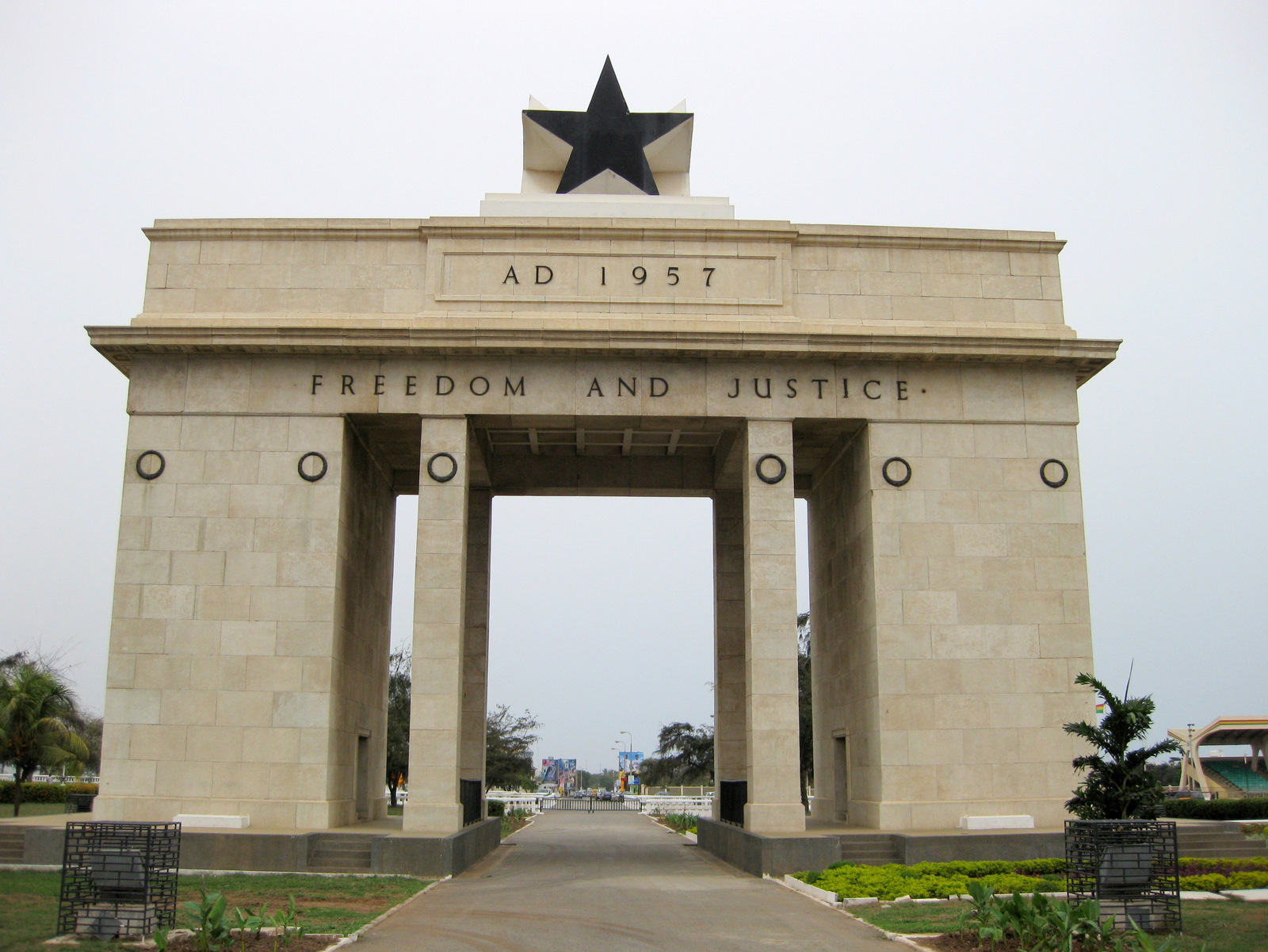
Black Star Gate, Accra

Civil air ensign of Ghana

Flag of Ghana (1964–66)

House flag of Ghana's former national shipping carrier, the Black Star Line

== Elsewhere ==
The Black Star was also in the flag of the African Party for the Independence of Guinea and Cape Verde (PAIGC) on which the flag of Guinea-Bissau and the former flag of Cape Verde were based. The flag of São Tomé and Príncipe consists of the Ethiopian Pan-African colours with two black stars, one each for São Tomé and Príncipe. The flag of the short-lived Union of African States had three black stars, one for each member state. Black Star Industries, named after the Black Star Line, is a commercial venture associated with the U.S. African People's Socialist Party.

PAIGC flag

Flag of Guinea-Bissau

Emblem of Guinea-Bissau

Roundel of the Guinea-Bissau air force

Flag of Cape Verde (1975–92)

Flag of São Tomé and Príncipe

Flag of Somaliland

Flag of Suriname (proposal 3)

Union of African States flag (1961–62)

UFEFCF flag

== See also ==
- Flags of Africa
- National symbol
- Flags with stars
