= Ghana at the 2022 World Aquatics Championships =

- Flag of Ghana
- FINA code: GHA
- National federation: Ghana Swimming Federation

in Budapest, Hungary
- Competitors: 3 in 1 sport
- Medals: Gold 0 Silver 0 Bronze 0 Total 0

World Aquatics Championships appearances
- 1973; 1975; 1978; 1982; 1986; 1991; 1994; 1998; 2001; 2003; 2005; 2007; 2009; 2011; 2013; 2015; 2017; 2019; 2022; 2023; 2024

Ghana competed at the 2022 World Aquatics Championships in Budapest, Hungary from 18 June to 3 July.

== Swimming ==
Athlete	Event	Heat		Semifinal		Final	
Athlete	Event	Time	Rank	Time	Rank	Time	Rank
Abeku Jackson	Men's 50 m butterfly	24.11	37	did not advance			
Abeku Jackson	Men's 100 m butterfly	54.67	44	did not advance			
Kaya Forson	Women's 50 m freestyle	29.25	67	did not advance			
Kaya Forson	Women's 100 m freestyle	1:03.19	51	did not advance			
Zaira Forson	Women's 200 m freestyle	2:20.83	37	did not advance			
Zaira Forson	Women's 200 m individual medley	2:41.45	38	did not advance			
