= List of Ghanaian flags =

The following is a list of flags associated with Ghana. For more information about the current national flag, see flag of Ghana.

== National flag ==
Flag	Date	Use	Description
	1966–present	Flag of Ghana	A horizontal triband of red, gold, and green, charged with a black star in the centre.

== Government flags ==
Flag	Date	Use	Description
	1966–present	Flag of the president of Ghana	A horizontal triband of red, gold, and green, charged with a black star in the centre, with a gold fringe.
	1964–1966	Flag of the president of Ghana	An electric blue field with the government emblem in the centre.
	1966–present	Flag of the president of Ghana	A navy blue field with the government emblem in the centre.

== Ethnic group flags ==
Flag	Date	Use	Description
	1935–present	Flag of the Ashanti people	A horizontal tricolour of gold, black, and green separated by thin white stripes, with the Golden Stool stationed in the middle of flag.
	?–present	Flag of the Ewe people	A horizontal triband of green (top), red, and green with three golden stars in the red stripe.
	?–present	Flag of the Hausa people	A white field with the Dagin Arewa star in the centre.
	?–present	Flag of the Yoruba people	A blue field with a white disc off-centre toward the hoist and two green rings and a golden spear inside the disc.

== Political party flags ==
Flag	Date	Use	Description
	1992–present	Flag of the Ghanan National Democratic Congress	Four horizontal stripes of black, red, white, and green with the emblem in the centre.
	1966–present	Flag of the Convention People's Party	
	2017–present	Flag of Western Togoland	
Link to file	1992–present	Flag of the People's National Convention	
Link to file	2006–2012	Flag of the Democratic Freedom Party	

== Military flags ==
Flag	Date	Use	Description
	1964–1966	Civil ensign of Ghana	A red field with the national flag, fimbriated in black, in the canton.
	1966–present	Civil ensign of Ghana	A red field with the national flag, fimbriated in black, in the canton.
	1964–1966	Naval ensign of Ghana	Red St. George's Cross on a white field, with the national flag in canton.
	1966–present	Naval ensign of Ghana	Red St. George's Cross on a white field, with the national flag in canton.
	1964–1966	Air Force ensign of Ghana	A light-blue field with the national flag in canton and charged in the fly with a red, white, and green roundel.
	1966–present	Air Force ensign of Ghana	A light-blue field with the national flag in canton and charged in the fly with a red, yellow, and green roundel.
	1964–1966	Civil air ensign of Ghana	A light-blue field with the national flag in canton and charged in the fly with a black five-pointed star.
	1966–present	Civil air ensign of Ghana	A light-blue field with the national flag in canton and charged in the fly with a black five-pointed star.

== Proposed flags ==
Flag	Date	Use	Description
	2002	Emmanuel Enoch Agbozo's proposal	
	1914	Proposed flag of German Togoland	A tricolour, made of three equal horizontal bands coloured black (top), white, and red (bottom) with the emblem of Togoland in the centre.

== Historical flags ==
Flag	Date	Use	Description
	1482–1485	Flag of the Kingdom of Portugal (Portuguese Gold Coast)	Five blue escutcheons each charged with an undetermined number of bezants on a white field. Border: red with yellow castles and a green cross of the Order of Aviz.
	1485–1495	Flag of the Kingdom of Portugal (Portuguese Gold Coast)	Five blue escutcheons each charged with five bezants on a white field. Border: red with seven yellow castles.
	1495–1521	Flag of the Kingdom of Portugal (Portuguese Gold Coast)	A white field with the Portuguese coat of arms in the centre.
	1521–1578	Flag of the Kingdom of Portugal (Portuguese Gold Coast)	A white field with the Portuguese coat of arms in the centre.
	1578–1640	Flag of the Kingdom of Portugal (Portuguese Gold Coast)	A white field with the Portuguese coat of arms in the centre.
	1612–1795	The Prince's Flag of the Dutch Republic (Dutch Gold Coast)	A horizontal tricolour of orange, white, and blue.
	1616–1640	Flag of the Kingdom of Portugal (Portuguese Gold Coast) (putative flag)	A white field with the Portuguese coat of arms in the centre.
	1631–1637; 1663–1700	Flag of the Kingdom of England (English Gold Coast)	A white field with centred red cross.
	1640–1642	Flag of the Kingdom of Portugal (Portuguese Gold Coast)	A white field with the Portuguese coat of arms in the centre.
	1650–1658; 1660–1663	Flag of the Kingdom of Sweden (Swedish Gold Coast)	Blue triple-tailed swallowtail flag with a yellow Nordic cross that extends to the edges of the flag and forms the middle tail.
	1652–1672	States Flag of the Dutch Republic (Dutch Gold Coast)	A horizontal tricolour of red, white, and blue.
	1658–1850	Flag of Denmark–Norway and the Kingdom of Denmark (Danish Gold Coast)	A red field charged with a white Nordic cross that extends to the edges; the vertical part of the cross is shifted to the hoist side.
	1663–1700	Flag of the Royal African Company	A white field with centred red cross with a red and white checkered border.
	1682–1721	Flag of the Holy Roman Empire (Brandenburger/Prussian Gold Coast)	A black double-headed eagle with haloes on a yellow field.
	1682–1701	Flag of the Margraviate of Brandenburg (Brandenburger Gold Coast)	Seven horizontal stripes alternating white and black; with a red eagle off-centred toward the hoist.
	1684–1701	Flag of the Margraviate of Brandenburg (Brandenburger Gold Coast)	A white field with a red crowned eagle off-centred toward the hoist.
	1701–1721	Flag of the Kingdom of Prussia (Prussian Gold Coast)	A black eagle holding a sword and rod on a white field, a crown on top.
	1750–1801	Flag of the Kingdom of Great Britain	A superimposition of the flags of England and Scotland.
	1795–1813	Flag of the French First Republic and the First French Empire (French occupied Dutch Gold Coast)	A vertical tricolour of blue, white, and red.
	1795–1806	Flag of the Batavian Republic	A horizontal triband of red, white, and blue with the Republic's emblem in the canton.
	1801–1960	Flag of the United Kingdom	A superimposition of the flags of England and Scotland with the Saint Patrick's Saltire (representing Ireland).
	1806–1872	Flag of the Kingdom of Holland, the Sovereign Principality of the United Netherlands, the United Kingdom of the Netherlands and the Kingdom of the Netherlands (Dutch Gold Coast)	A horizontal tricolour of red, white, and blue.
	1870–1877	Flag of British West Africa	A blue ensign defaced with the emblem of the West African Settlements.
	1877–1957	Flag of the British Gold Coast	A blue ensign defaced with the emblem of the Gold Coast.
	1884–1916	Flag of the German Empire (German Togoland)	A tricolour, made of three equal horizontal bands coloured black (top), white, and red (bottom).
	1884–1916	Colonial flag of the German Empire	A tricolour, made of three equal horizontal bands coloured black (top), white, and red (bottom) with the Reichsadler in the centre.
	1916–1956	Flag of the British Togoland	A Blue Ensign defaced with an elephant.
	1957–1964	Flag of the Dominion of Ghana and first flag of Ghana	A horizontal tricolour of red, gold, and green, charged with a black star in the centre.
	1958–1961	Flag of the Union of African States	A horizontal tricolour of red, gold, and green, charged with two black stars on the yellow band.
	1961–1962	Flag of the Union of African States	A horizontal tricolour of red, gold, and green, charged with three black stars on the yellow band.
	1964–1966	Second flag of Ghana	A horizontal tricolour of red, white, and green, charged with a black star in the centre.

== See also ==
- Flag of Ghana
- Coat of arms of Ghana
