= Rita Naa Odoley Sowah =

Ghanaian politician

Hon. Rita Naa Odoley Sowah
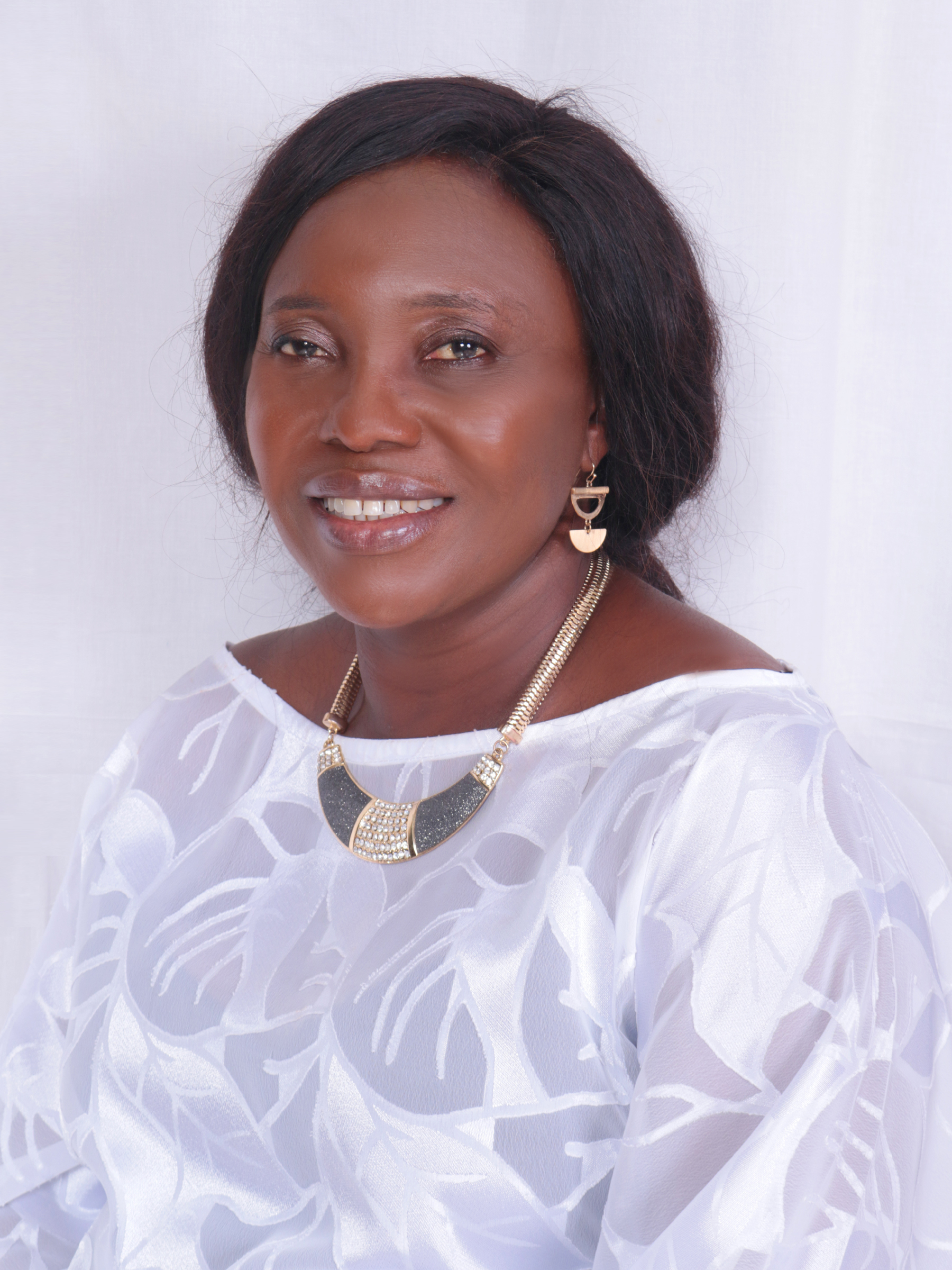

Member of Parliament for La Dade Kotopon Constituency
- Incumbent
- Assumed office 7 January 2021
- Preceded by: Vincent Sowah Odotei

Personal details
- Party: National Democratic Congress
- Occupation: Politician

Rita Naa Odoley Sowah (born 2 July 1968) is a Ghanaian politician. She is a member of the National Democratic Congress (NDC). She is the first female member of parliament for the La Dade Kotopon Constituency. A native of Labadi in the Greater Accra Region, she previously served as the Municipal Chief Executive (MCE) for La Dade kotopon Municipal Assembly (LADMA) from 2013 to 2017.

== Early life ==
Rita Naa Odoley Sowah was born on 2 July 1968. She is a Ga and a native La also known as Labadi in the Greater Accra Region of Ghana.

== Career ==
=== Early career ===
Sowah worked as a secretary at the Premix Secretariat under the Fisheries Commission of Ghana. She also worked as a Data Entry Officer at the Department of National Lotteries now the National Lottery Authority in Ghana and as a secretary at the La Dade Kotopon Office of the Member of Parliament.

=== Municipal Chief Executive ===
She served as the first Municipal Chief Executive (MCE) for La Dade kotopon Municipal Assembly (LADMA) from 2013 to 2017. She also served as the treasurer of National Association of Local Authorities of Ghana (NALAG).

== Politics ==
=== Parliamentary bid ===
She ran for the NDC primaries to be selected as their candidate going into the 2020 elections and won. She made history as the first female to win the La Dade-Kotopon parliamentary seat in the 2020 Parliamentary elections. She won by getting 47,606 representing 53.67% whilst her closest Joseph Gerald Tetteh Nyanyofio of the New Patriotic Party (NPP) polled 41,101 votes representing 46.33%. She is one of the 40 women who are representing their respective constituencies in the 8th Parliament from 7 January 2021.

=== Member of Parliament ===
Sowah was sworn in as Member of Parliament representing the La Dade Kotopon Constituency in the 8th Parliament of the 4th Republic of Ghana on 7 January 2021. She serves as a member on the Youth, Sports and Culture Committee and the Gender and Children Committee of Parliament.

== Personal life ==
Sowah is a Christian.
