= Ghana at the 2023 World Aquatics Championships =

- Flag of Ghana
- FINA code: GHA
- National federation: Ghana Swimming Association

in Fukuoka, Japan
- Competitors: 3 in 1 sport
- Medals: Gold 0 Silver 0 Bronze 0 Total 0

World Aquatics Championships appearances
- 1973; 1975; 1978; 1982; 1986; 1991; 1994; 1998; 2001; 2003; 2005; 2007; 2009; 2011; 2013; 2015; 2017; 2019; 2022; 2023; 2024

Ghana is set to compete at the 2023 World Aquatics Championships in Fukuoka, Japan from 14 to 30 July.

== Swimming ==
Ghana entered 3 swimmers.

Men

Athlete	Event	Heat		Semifinal		Final	
Athlete	Event	Time	Rank	Time	Rank	Time	Rank
Ekow Gwira	50 metre freestyle	27.22	101	Did not advance			
Ekow Gwira	100 metre freestyle	1:01.18	109	Did not advance			
Abeku Jackson	50 metre butterfly	24.14	48	Did not advance			
Abeku Jackson	100 metre butterfly	53.73	42	Did not advance			

Women

Athlete	Event	Heat		Semifinal		Final	
Athlete	Event	Time	Rank	Time	Rank	Time	Rank
Nubia Adjei	50 metre backstroke	31.61	48	Did not advance			
Nubia Adjei	50 metre butterfly	29.54	48	Did not advance			
