= Ghana at the 2024 World Aquatics Championships =

- Flag of Ghana
- FINA code: GHA
- National federation: Ghana Swimming Association

in Doha, Qatar
- Competitors: 3 in 1 sport
- Medals: Gold 0 Silver 0 Bronze 0 Total 0

World Aquatics Championships appearances
- 1973; 1975; 1978; 1982; 1986; 1991; 1994; 1998; 2001; 2003; 2005; 2007; 2009; 2011; 2013; 2015; 2017; 2019; 2022; 2023; 2024

Ghana competed at the 2024 World Aquatics Championships in Doha, Qatar from 2 to 18 February.

== Competitors ==
The following is the list of competitors in the Championships.

Sport	Men	Women	Total
Swimming	2	1	3
Total	2	1	3

== Swimming ==
Ghana entered 3 swimmers.

Men

Athlete	Event	Heat		Semifinal		Final	
Athlete	Event	Time	Rank	Time	Rank	Time	Rank
Abeiku Jackson	50 metre butterfly	24.29	36	Did not advance			
Abeiku Jackson	100 metre butterfly	54.28	38	Did not advance			
Christian Nii Nortey	50 metre freestyle	27.16	96	Did not advance			
Christian Nii Nortey	100 metre freestyle	1:02.39	102	Did not advance			

Women

Athlete	Event	Heat		Semifinal		Final	
Athlete	Event	Time	Rank	Time	Rank	Time	Rank
Unilez Takyi	50 metre freestyle	27.75	65	Did not advance			
Unilez Takyi	100 metre freestyle	1:01.68	55	Did not advance			
