= Nanjira Sambuli =

Kenyan researcher, writer, policy analyst and strategist

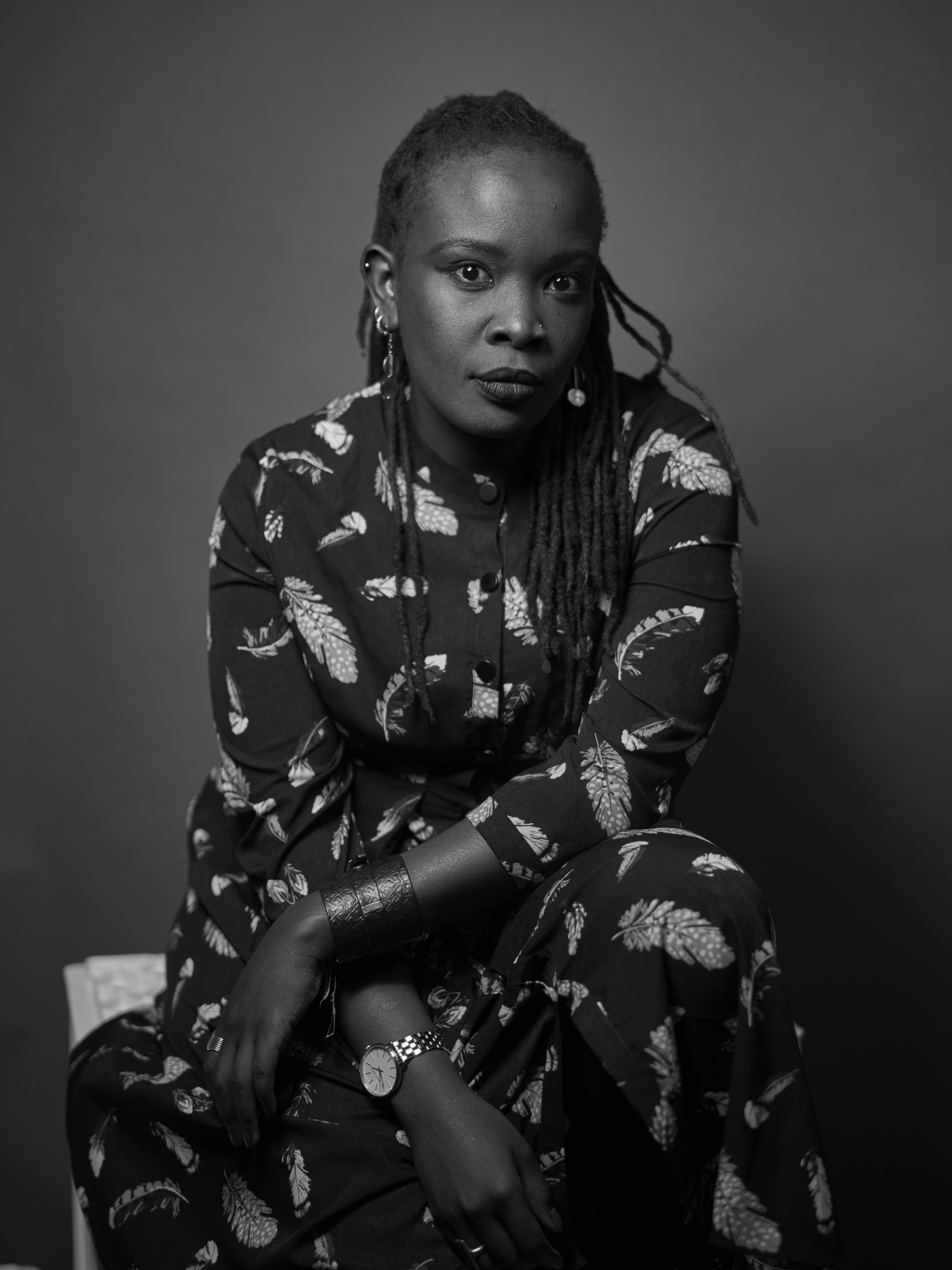
- Born: Nanjira Sambuli; 1988 (age 37–38); Kenya
- Citizenship: Kenyan
- Education: Bachelor's degree in Actuarial Science
- Alma mater: University of Nairobi
- Occupation: Tech Policy and Governance Analyst
- Years active: 2013–present
- Employer(s): Carnegie Endowment for International Peace; World Wide Web Foundation (former); iHub (former)
- Organization(s): Transform Health Coalition; Digital Impact Alliance (DIAL); Development Gateway; The New Humanitarian
- Known for: Digital equality advocacy, ICT policy, gender and technology research
- Notable work: Editor of Innovative Africa; Women's Rights Online initiative
- Title: Fellow, Technology and International Affairs Program (Carnegie Endowment)
- Board member of: Transform Health Coalition (President & Co-Chair); The New Humanitarian; Development Gateway; Digital Impact Alliance (DIAL)
- Awards: BBC 100 Women (2019); New African 100 Most Influential Africans (2016)

Nanjira Sambuli (born in 1988) is a Kenyan researcher, writer, policy analyst and strategist interested in and working on understanding the unfolding, gendered impacts of ICT adoption on governance, media, entrepreneurship and culture.

== Education ==
Sambuli holds a bachelor's degree in actuarial science from the University of Nairobi.

== Career ==
Nanjira is a Fellow in the Technology and International Affairs Program at The Carnegie Endowment for International Peace, and a Ford Global Fellow. She is also President and co-Chair of the Transform Health Coalition, a board member at The New Humanitarian, Development Gateway and Digital Impact Alliance (DIAL) and a Commissioner on the Lancet & Financial Times Global Commission (Governing Health Futures 2030).

Nanjira also sits on several advisory boards, including the World Economic Forum’s Technology and Social Justice Initiatives, ⟨A+⟩ Alliance for Inclusive Algorithms and the Carnegie Council’s AI and Equality Initiative. Additionally, she is a Diplomacy Moderator at the Geneva Science and Diplomacy Anticipator (GESDA).

Nanjira has served as a Senior Policy Manager and previously as the Digital Equality Advocacy Manager at the World Wide Web Foundation. Nanjira Sambuli was the former Research Lead and Research Manager at iHub in Nairobi between 2013 and 2016. She has spoken at a number of conferences and events about digital equality and digital policies, including re:publica 2019, rp:Accra 2018, Open Up 2016 and the African Summit on Women and Girls in Technology. Nanjira is a member of the UN Secretary General's High Level Panel on Digital Cooperation and served as a deputy on the UN Secretary General's High Level Panel for Women's Economic Empowerment (2016–17).

== Works ==
Sambuli led the Women's Rights Online work at the Web Foundation, that comprises a network of gender and digital rights organisations across Africa, Asia and Latin America.

Sambuli developed a framework for accessing the viability, verification and validity of Crowdsourcing, Umati, an online dangerous speech monitoring project. This project currently runs in Kenya, Nigeria and South Sudan. She has worked publications on a range of issues including Kenya's Media Policy and Civic Tech Landscape.

She is the editor of Innovative Africa. She also occasionally writes a column for the Daily Nation newspaper in Kenya and international press.

In 2018, she was invited by António Guterres, the United Nations Secretary General to join the High- Level Panel on Digital Cooperation.

== Awards and Recognitions ==
- 2019 - She was named in the list of BBC 100 Women.
- 2016 - She was named one of the New African Magazine's 100 Most Influential Africans
