= Flag of Guinea-Bissau =

Guinea-Bissau
- Use: National flag and ensign
- Proportion: 1:2
- Adopted: 24 September 1973; 53 years ago
- Design: One vertical red band on the hoist side charged with a black five-pointed star; two horizontal bands on the fly side of yellow and green

The national flag of Guinea-Bissau was adopted on the day Guinea-Bissau proclaimed its independence from Portugal on 24 September 1973. It is almost identical to the flag of the African Party for the Independence of Guinea and Cape Verde, the country's dominant party and previously sole ruling party.

The black star symbolises the leadership of the PAIGC, with its colour representing the people of Africa. Yellow and green correspond to Guinea-Bissau's northern savannas and southern forests, respectively, and the two are also meant to represent agriculture. Little legislation has been made on the proper colours of the flag, though a piece of legislation from 1993 states, "Anyone who, publicly, by words, gestures or written disclosures, or by other means of communication with the public, outrages the Republic, the national flag or anthem, the weapons or emblems of Bissau-Guinean sovereignty or fails to respect due to him, is punished up to three years in prison."

== Design and symbolism ==
Like the flag of Cape Verde upon independence, the flag of Guinea-Bissau is based on that of the African Party for the Independence of Guinea and Cape Verde (PAIGC), which is the same but with the party's initials below the black star. The party adopted its flag in 1961, echoing the Pan-African colours used by the existing flags of neighbouring Ghana and Guinea, namely red, yellow, and green. The black star symbolises the leadership of the PAIGC, with its colour representing the people of Africa. Yellow and green correspond to Guinea-Bissau's northern savannas and southern forests, respectively, and broadly speaking the yellow is said to refer to agriculture and the fruits of labour, while green is said to represent the agriculture in the jungle. The yellow is also sometimes reported to represent the Sun or mineral wealth, green represents hope, and red represents bloodshed in the revolution.

=== Colours ===
There has not been legislation on the specific shades of these colours, but these have been used as standards by such organisations as Olympic Games.

(1958–present)	Red	Yellow	Green	Black
Refs				
Pantone	032 C	109 C	355 C	Black
CMYK	0-0.92-0.82-0.19	0-0.17-0.91-0.01	1-0-0.35-0.42	0-0-0-100
RGB	206-17-38	252-209-22	0-148-96	0-0-0
Hexadecimal	#CE1126	#FCD116	#009460	#000000

== History ==
Flag of the African Party for the Independence of Guinea and Cape Verde

Flag of Cape Verde (1975–1992), following independence, based on the PAIGC flag.

The African Party for the Independence of Guinea and Cape Verde was established in Bissau on 19 September 1956 as the African Party of Independence (Partido Africano da Independência), and was based on the Movement for the National Independence of Portuguese Guinea (Movimento para Independência Nacional da Guiné Portuguesa) founded in 1954 by Henri Labéry and Amílcar Cabral. The party had six founding members; Cabral, his brother Luís, Aristides Pereira, Fernando Fortes, Júlio Almeida and Elisée Turpin. Rafael Paula Barbosa became its first president, whilst Amílcar Cabral was appointed secretary-general.

In 1961, the party adopted a flag based on the flags of two countries it was considering unifying with in some way following independence - Guinea-Conakry and Ghana. (The two had already formed Union of African States in 1958). They used the Pan-African colours of yellow, green and red, which had been popularised by Ghana and before that, Ethiopia. They added the Black Star of Africa, an established symbol of anti-colonial resistance, and put it and a red bar on the left (hoist) side of the flag, to represent the country's position on the West coast of Africa. The flag also has a further geographical meaning, with the yellow stripe representing Guinea-Bissau's northern savannahs, and the green stripe representing its southern forests. This flag differed from the modern Guinea-Bissau flag, however, as it also featured the initials of the African Party's Portuguese initials PAIGC.

=== Adoption ===
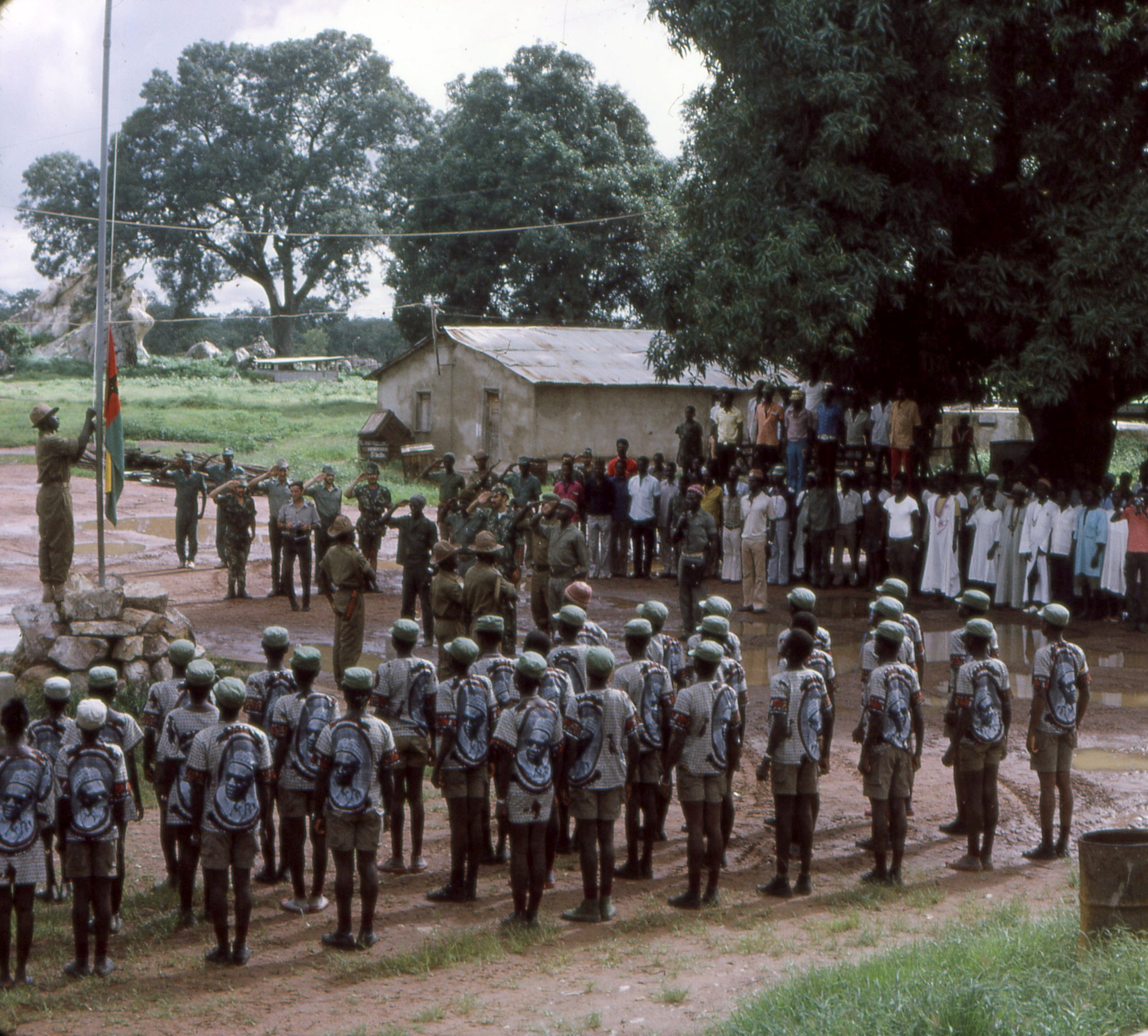
The flag of Guinea-Bissau is raised in place of the flag of Portugal in Canjadude, 1974.

The flag was adopted upon Guinea-Bissau's proclamation of its independence from Portugal on 24 September 1973. The Independence of Guinea Bissau was proclaimed by the National Assembly, which was appointed by the PAIGC, the independence party which fought for independence from Portugal for Guinea-Bissau and Cape Verde. The latter also adopted a flag similar to the PAIGC flag upon its independence, though later abandoned the Marxist ideas of the party, and abandoned the flag in the process.

The first edition of the Government Gazette of Guinea-Bissau was published on 4 January 1975, and describes the flag as follows:

The Guinea-Bissau National Flag shall consist of three stripes bands with the same surface, one being red arranged vertically and marked with a black star. The other two are arranged horizontally, the upper one being yellow and the lower one being green.

Notably not specifying the exact shades of each colour, nor the ratio of the flag (1:2). The second constitution gave a similarly vague description:

The National Flag of the Republic of Guinea-Bissau is formed by three rectangular bands, red, in a vertical position, and yellow and green, in a horizontal position, respectively on the upper and lower right sides. The red band is marked with a black five-pointed star.

Though this one clarifies that the star has five points.

== Gallery ==
Flag of the armed forces

Roundel of Guinea-Bissau
