= Ghana at the 2017 World Aquatics Championships =

- Flag of Ghana
- FINA code: GHA
- National federation: Ghana Swimming Federation

in Budapest, Hungary
- Competitors: 4 in 1 sport
- Medals: Gold 0 Silver 0 Bronze 0 Total 0

World Aquatics Championships appearances
- 1973; 1975; 1978; 1982; 1986; 1991; 1994; 1998; 2001; 2003; 2005; 2007; 2009; 2011; 2013; 2015; 2017; 2019; 2022; 2023; 2024

Ghana competed at the 2017 World Aquatics Championships in Budapest, Hungary from 14 July to 30 July.

== Swimming ==
Ghana has received a Universality invitation from FINA to send a maximum of four swimmers (two men and two women) to the World Championships.

Athlete	Event	Heat		Semifinal		Final	
Athlete	Event	Time	Rank	Time	Rank	Time	Rank
Abeiku Jackson	Men's 100 m freestyle	DNS		Did not advance			
Abeiku Jackson	Men's 50 m butterfly	DNS		Did not advance			
Kwesi Jackson	Men's 50 m freestyle	DNS		Did not advance			
Maayaa Ayawere	Women's 50 m freestyle	DNS		Did not advance			
Maayaa Ayawere	Women's 100 m breaststroke	DNS		Did not advance			
Laila Zangwio	Women's 50 m breaststroke	42.03	49	Did not advance			
