= Sweet Adjeley =

Ghanaian-American chef and food vlogger

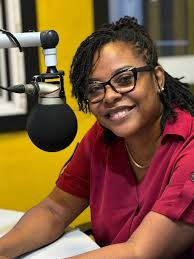
Sweet Adjeley, Ghanaian food content creator

Sweet Adjeley, also known as Marklina Naa Adjeley Quaye, is a Ghanaian American-based chef, food vlogger, and digital content creator known for producing cooking tutorials and providing useful cooking hacks. She is the first Ghanaian food blogger to have reached over 1 million subscribers on YouTube and Facebook.

== Early and personal life ==
Sweet Adjeley developed an interest in cooking at age 10, growing up in Labadi, a town in Accra, Ghana. She currently resides in New Jersey with her husband and three children.

== Career ==
Sweet Adjeley rose to prominence through online cooking tutorials. Her content focuses mainly on Ghanaian cuisine and traditional dishes. She mentioned her husband’s initial opposition to entering into content creation and negative comments as some of her challenges on her journey.

== Education ==
She attended Tema Secondary School, where she studied home economics, and later continued her culinary education at the New York Restaurant School, focusing on culinary arts.
