= Amon Kotei =

Ghanaian artist (1915–2011)

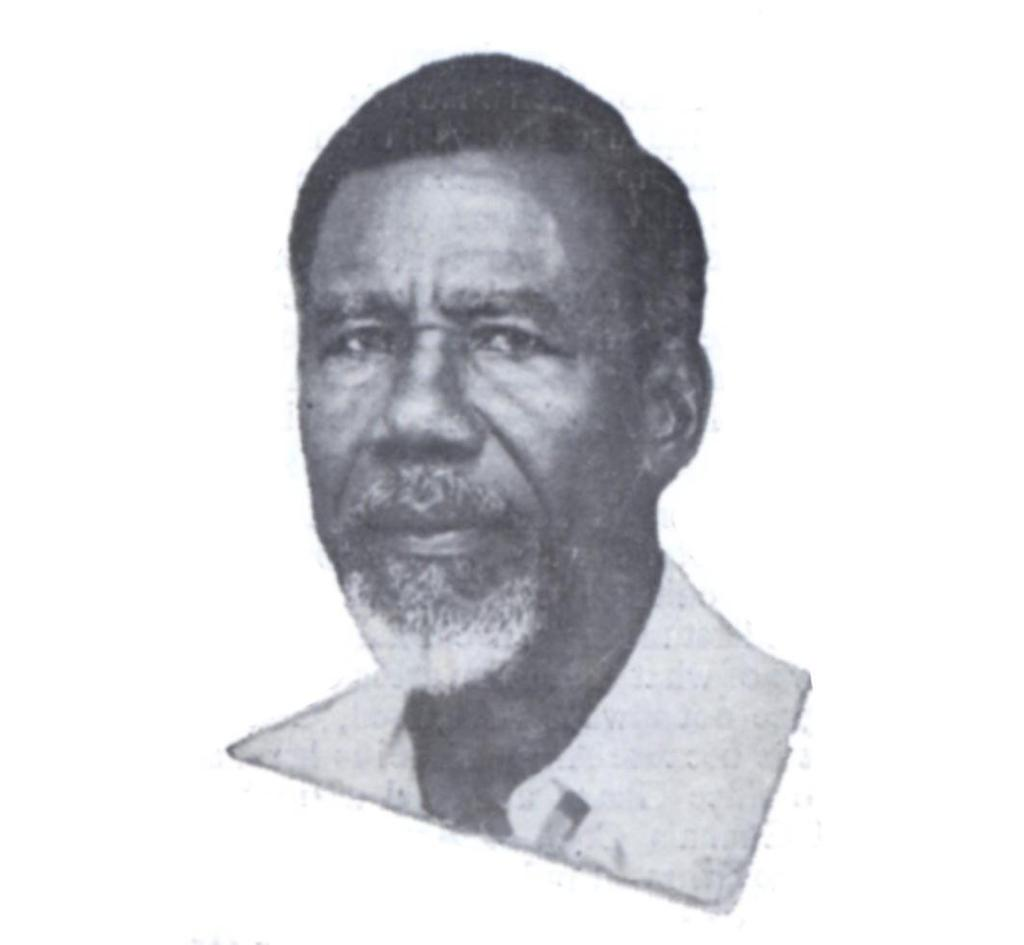
- Amon Kotei, designer of the Ghanaian coat of arms
- Born: May 24, 1915; Labadi, Greater Accra Region, Ghana
- Died: October 17, 2011 (aged 96)
- Education: Achimota School
- Alma mater: London School of Printing and Graphic Art
- Known for: Designer of the coat of arms of Ghana

Nii Amon Kotei (24 May 1915 – 17 October 2011) was a Ghanaian sculptor, painter, musician, surveyor, and graphic artist. He is mostly remembered and celebrated as the designer of the coat of arms of Ghana. He was one of Ghana's leading artists.

== Early life ==
Kotei was born on 24 May 1915, in a town called Labadi, located in the Greater Accra region of Ghana. He belonged to the Ga ethnic group.

== Education and military service ==
Kotei was awarded a scholarship at Achimota School and later received a scholarship to study art at the London School of Printing and Graphic Art from 1949 to 1952. During World War II, he served in the Royal West African Frontier Force and worked in the Cartographic Division of the Army drawing maps and plans for soldiers on the front lines.

== Notable contributions ==
His most notable contribution was the creation of Ghana's national coat of arms on 4 March 1957. Kotei was commissioned by the British colonial government to replace the older badge which depicted an Elephant and a Palm tree; two symbols used throughout British West African colonies. After his initial design, under the government's instruction, the coat of arms was sent to the Queen's College of Heraldry for approval.

The Ghanaian coat of arms, found on all government official letter heads, is composed of a shield, divided into four quarters by a green St. George's Cross, rimmed with gold.

== Death ==
Kotei died on 17 October 2011. Following his passing, his contribution to Ghanaian art and heraldry were recognized by the Ghanaian parliament.

== Awards ==
He was awarded the State Honour of Grand Medal, Civil Division, for his coat of arms design presented to him on Friday, 7 March 1997, by then-president Jerry Rawlings. He received several other awards.
