= Theodosia Okoh Hockey Stadium =

Field hockey stadium in Accra, Ghana

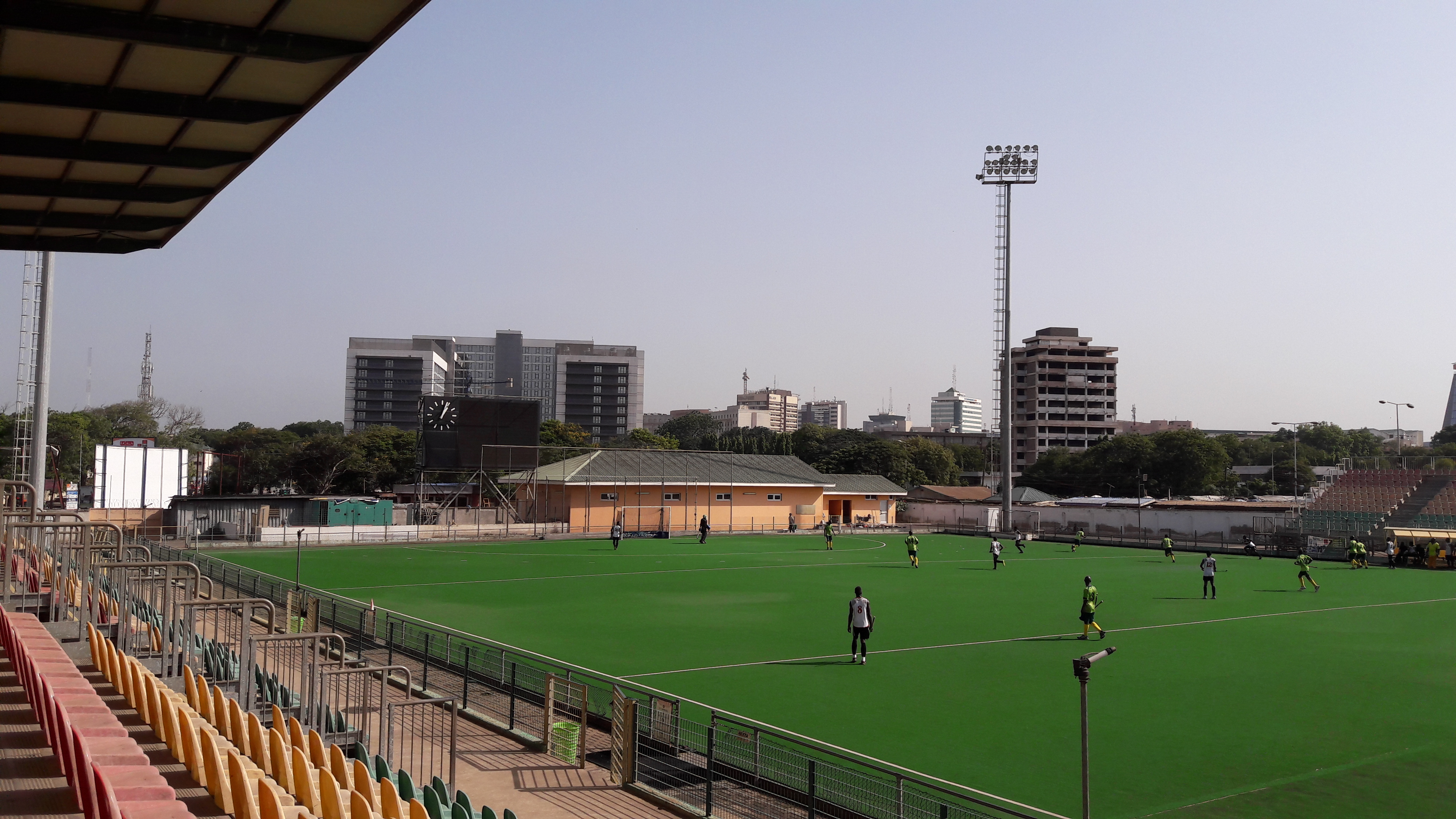
- Interactive map of Theodosia Okoh Hockey Stadium
- Location: Accra, Greater Accra Region; Ghana
- Coordinates: 5°32′53″N 0°12′11″W
- Capacity: 1,200
- Surface: Astroturf

The Theodosia Okoh Hockey Stadium is a field hockey stadium in Accra, Ghana. The stadium hosted the 2009 Hockey African Cup for Nations.

== History ==
The stadium was named after Theodosia Okoh, a former Ghana Hockey Association chairman.

The Ghana men's and women's national hockey teams use the stadium for trainings and matches, in preparation for international tournaments.

The stadium is also home to the men's and women's Ghanaian Hockey League, as well as the master's and youth leagues.

== Gallery ==
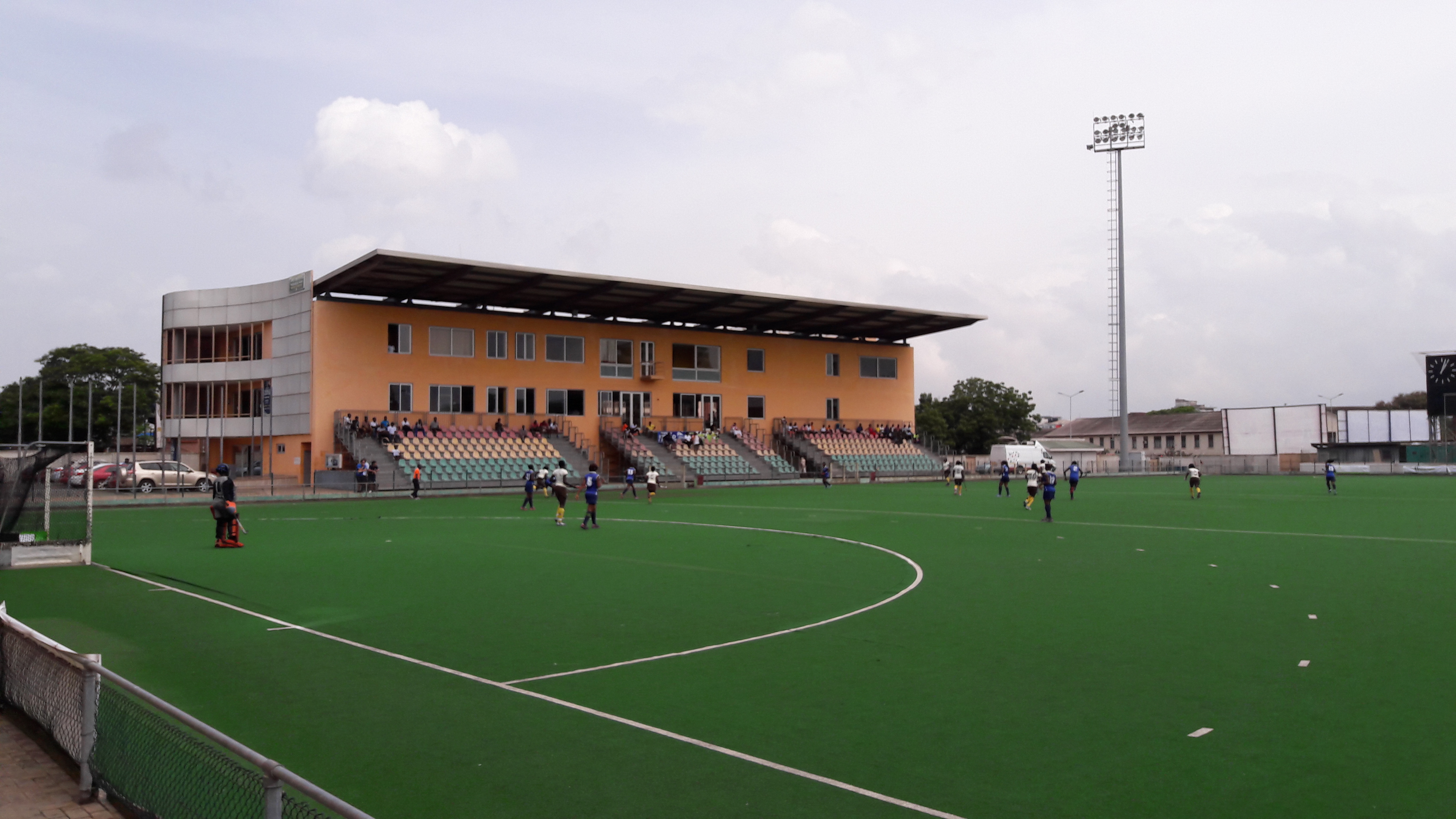

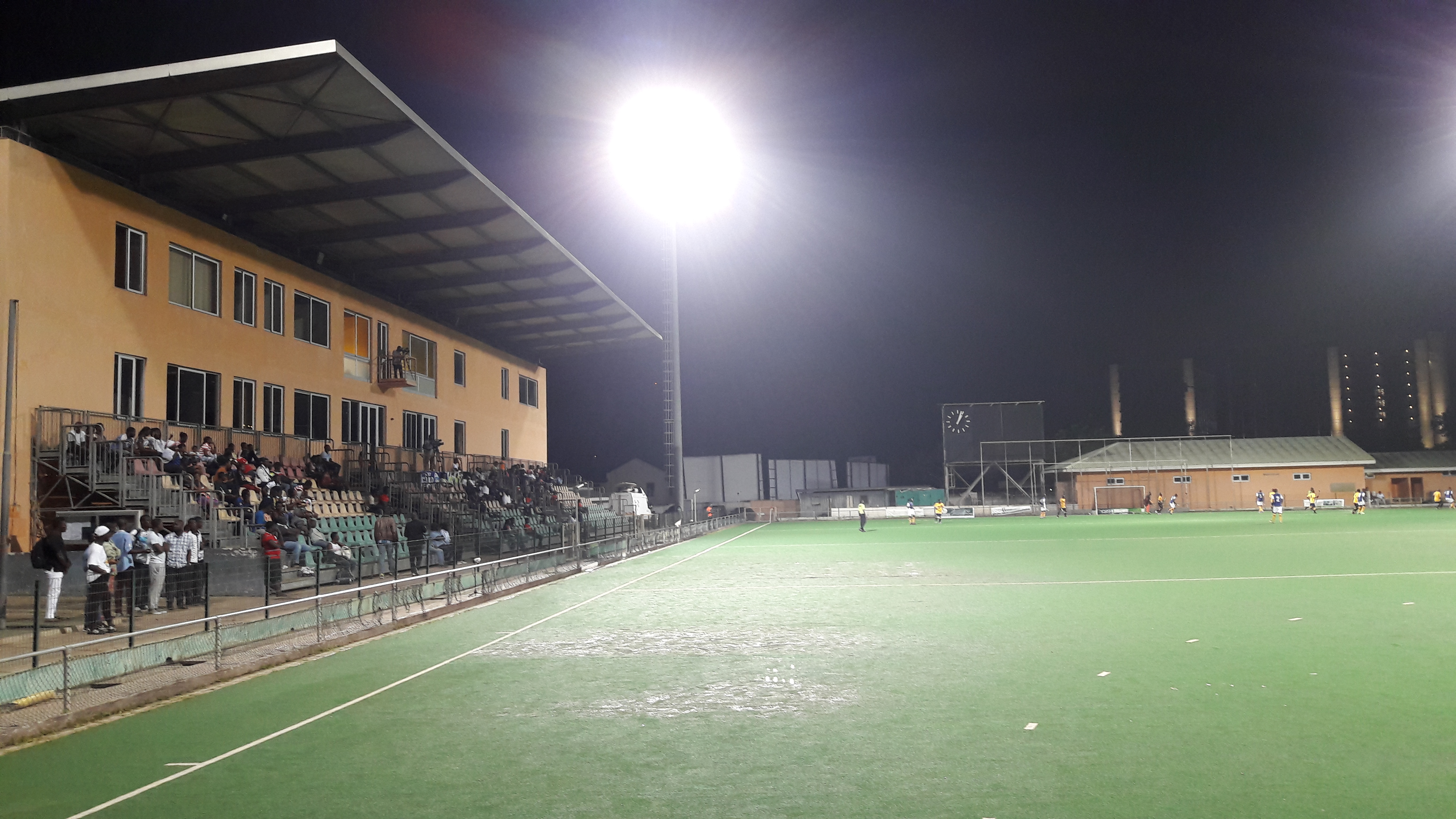

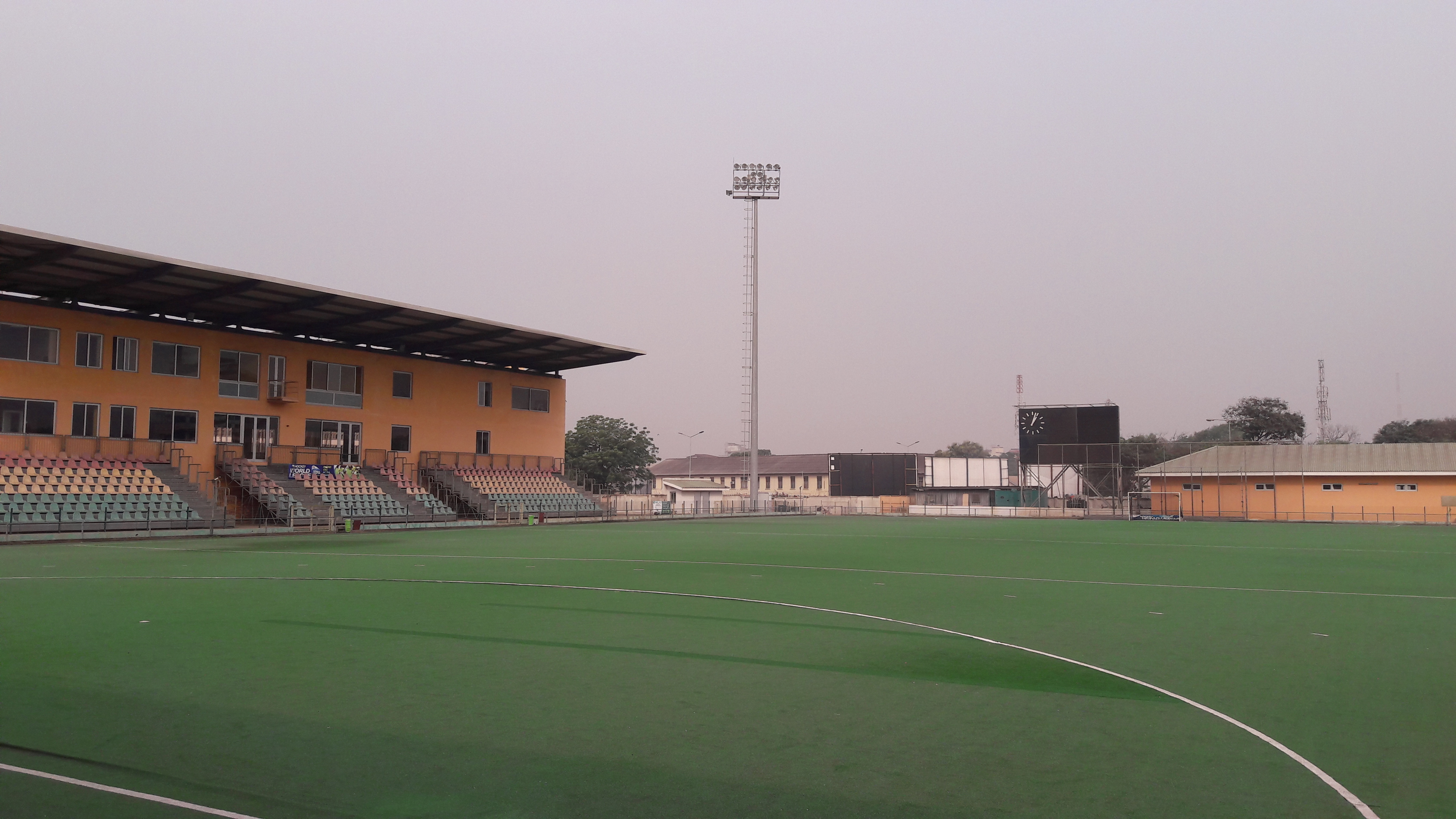

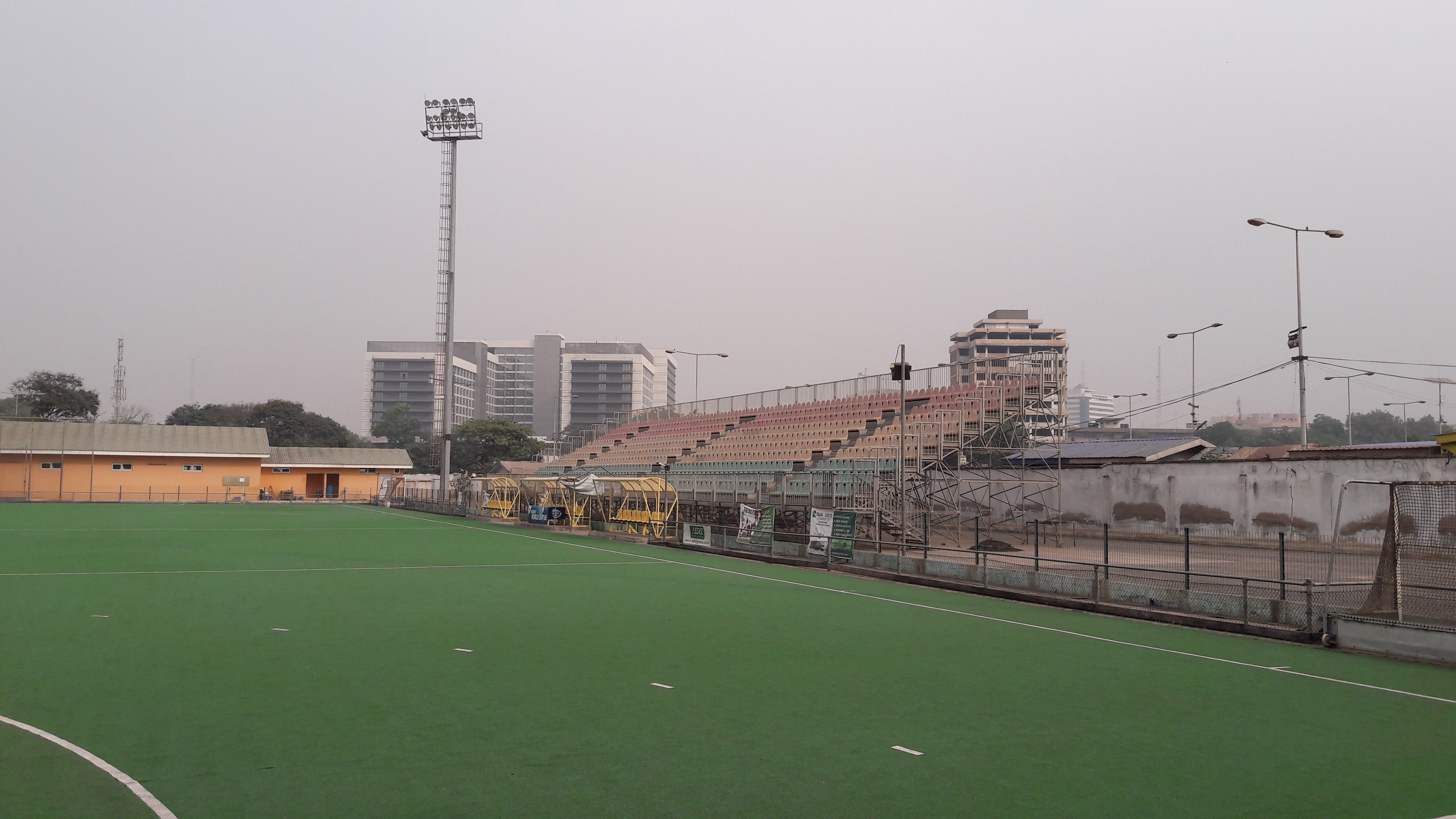
