= African Summit on Women and Girls in Technology =

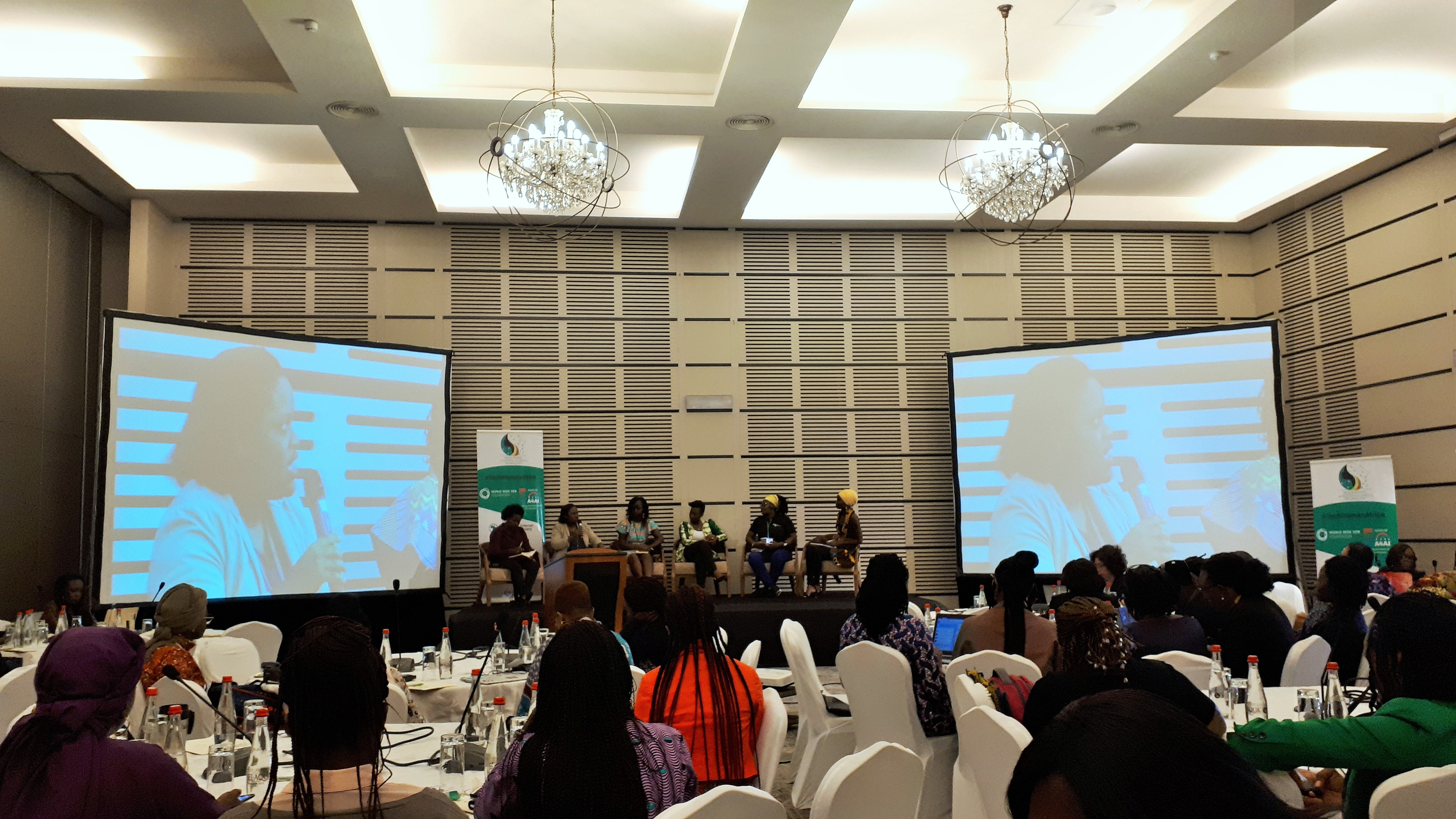
A discussion panel at the summit

The African Summit on Women and Girls in Technology is an international summit organized by the World Wide Web Foundation and the Alliance for Affordable Internet in collaboration with other international organizations and ministries. It is a gathering of digital equality advocates who are mostly women and the main focus of discussion is bridging the digital gender gap.

== Agenda ==
The summit focuses on exploring how technology policies could further the rights and interest of women in Africa and how these policies could work to help bridge the digital gender gap.

=== Topics ===
- Affordable Broadband
- Women’s rights online
- Digital education and skills
- Digital Entrepreneurship

== 2016 - First African Summit on Women and Girls in Technology ==
The First Edition of the African Summit on Women and Girls in Technology was held on the 13 to the 14 of September 2016 in Accra, with about 150 digital equality advocates in attendance. It was a collaboration between Alliance for Affordable Internet (A4AI), the World Wide Web Foundation, UN Women, the Ghana-India Kofi Annan Center of Excellence in ICT (AITI-KACE), and the African Development Bank.

== 2018 - Second African Summit on Women and Girls in Technology ==
The second edition of the summit was held from the 9th – 11 October 2018 in Accra with over 250 participants in attendance. The 2018 summit is a collaboration between the World Wide Web Foundation, Alliance for Affordable Internet (A4AI), African Development Bank, Internet Society, Ministry of Communications, Ghana, Open Society Initiative for West Africa, UN Women, Federal Ministry for Economic Cooperation and Development Germany, Google, Facebook and the Swedish International Development Cooperation Agency. The three day summit includes lightning talks, panel discussions and workshops.

=== Participants ===
The 2018 edition of the summit was attended by the following dignitaries.

Country	Title	Name
Ghana	Deputy Minister of Communications	Vincent Sowah Odotei
Nigeria	Former Minister of Communication Technology in Nigeria	Omobola Johnson
Senegal	Gender Technical Advisor at the Ministry of Communication, Telecommunications, Posts and Digital Economy	Bitilokho N'diaye
