= Nii Amasah Namoale =

Ghanaian politician

Hon. Nii Amasah Namoale

Member of Parliament
- In office January 2005 – 2008
- President: John Kufuor
- Preceded by: Godfried Ako-Nai
- Constituency: Dade Kotopon

Member of Parliament
- In office 7 January 2009 – 6 January 2013
- President: John Atta Mills
- Constituency: Dade Kotopon
- Majority: NDC

Personal details
- Born: 14 July 1958 (age 68)
- Party: National Democratic Congress
- Children: 3
- Education: University of Cape Coast
- Occupation: Agronomist

Nii Amasah Namoale (born 14 July 1958) is a Ghanaian politician who served as member of parliament for Dadekotopon constituency in the Greater Accra region of Ghana from 7 January 2009 to 7 January 2017. Namoale was appointed Ghana's ambassabor to Brazil as of October 2025.

== Early life and education ==
Namoale was born on 14 July 1958. He hails from La-Accra, a town in the Greater Accra Region of Ghana. He schooled at Accra High School and Ofori Panin Senior High School. He entered the University of Cape Coast, Ghana and obtained his Master of Philosophy degree in agronomy in 2000.

== Career ==
Namoale is an Agronomist by profession. He has worked as the assistant director in the Ministry of Food & Agriculture.

== Politics ==
Namoale is a member of the National Democratic Congress (NDC). He was elected on the ticket of the National Democratic Congress as the Member of parliament for the Dade Kotopon constituency in the 5th parliament of the 4th republic of Ghana. He was elected with 42,678 votes out of the 74,499 total valid votes cast, equivalent to 57.3% of total valid votes cast. He was elected over Francis Nii Annan Sowah of the New Patriotic Party and Cynthia Akua Mensah of the Convention People's Party. These obtained 40.37% and 2.34% respectively of total valid votes cast. In 2012, he contested for the Dadekotopon seat on the ticket of the NDC for representation in the sixth parliament of the fourth republic and won. He was defeated by Hon Vincent Sowah Odotei in the 2016 parliamentary election. He has worked as the Deputy Minister of Agriculture. Namoale was appointed Ghana's ambassabor to Brazil as of October 2025.

== Personal life ==
Namoale is a Christian (Church of Christ). He is married with three children.
