= Ghana Hockey Association =

Governing body of field hockey in Ghana

- Sport: Field Hockey
- Jurisdiction: Ghana
- Founded: 1961
- Affiliation: FIH
- Regional affiliation: AHF
- (Ghana)

The Ghana Hockey Association is the governing body of field hockey in Ghana. It is affiliated to IHF International Hockey Federation and AHF African Hockey Federation. The headquarters of the association is in Accra, Ghana. The main hockey venue of the association is the Theodosia Okoh Hockey Stadium (named after the former president of the Ghana Hockey Association, Theodosia Okoh).

As of 2020, Dr. Ben K.D. Asante is the President and Rita Odei Asare is the Secretary General.

== History ==
The origin of Ghana Hockey Association goes back to November 1950. In 1961, Mr. Owusu Afriyie, Minister of Social Welfare, was elected the Chairman. Mr E.K. Okoh, Cabinet Secretary was elected as his deputy.
