= Theodosia Okoh =

Designer of the Ghana national flag (1922–2015)

Theodosia Salome Okoh
- Born: Theodosia Salome Abena Kumea Asihene; 13 June 1922; Effiduase, Gold Coast
- Died: 19 April 2015 (aged 92); Tema, Ghana
- Citizenship: Ghanaian
- Education: Achimota School
- Known for: Design of the Flag of Ghana
- Notable work: Ghana national flag
- Title: Chairman of the Ghana Hockey Association and President of the Ghana Hockey Federation
- Spouse: Enoch Kwabena Okoh
- Children: 3
- Parent(s): Rev. and Mrs Asihene
- Relatives: Ian Jones-Quartey (grandson); Rebecca Sugar (grandchild-in-law)

Theodosia Salome Okoh (née Theodosia Salome Abena Kumia Asihene on 13 June 1922 – 19 April 2015) was a Ghanaian teacher and artist known for designing Ghana's national flag in 1957. She exhibited her artwork internationally. She also played a leading role in the development of hockey in Ghana.

== Early years and education ==
She was born on 13 June 1922 as Theodosia Salome Abena Kumea Asihene in Effiduase to the Very Reverend Emmanuel Victor Asihene, a former moderator of the Presbyterian Church of Ghana, and Madam Dora Asihene, both from Anum in the Asuogyaman District of Ghana's Eastern Region. She was the fourth of eight children. She had the opportunity to travel around Ghana and abroad with her father.

She started school at Ashanti Efiduasi Primary School, continued to the Basel Mission Middle, Senior and Teacher Training Schools in Agogo and then Achimota School, where she received three years training in Fine Art.

== Career ==
When Ghana gained Independence from Britain, there was the need for a new flag which was advertised. She submitted her design, which was adopted as the national flag of Ghana by the country's first president, Kwame Nkrumah, from 6 March 1957. As she explained in an interview: "I decided on the three colors of red, gold and green because of the geography of Ghana. Ghana lies in the tropics and is blessed with rich vegetation. The color Gold was influenced by the mineral rich nature of our lands and Red commemorates those who died or worked for the country’s independence. The five-pointed lone star is symbolic of African emancipation and unity in the struggle against colonialism…."

Flag of Ghana

Theodosia Okoh was the first female chairman of the Ghana Hockey Association and later President of the Ghana Hockey Federation for more than 20 years, and it was during her tenure that Ghana first qualified for both the Hockey World Cup and the Olympic Games. She was named "the Joan of Arc of Ghana hockey" by Ohene Djan "because she rose to the occasion to save Ghana hockey when men were faltering and vacillating about development of the game. This is also the reason why the National Hockey Stadium was named after her in 2004". She was a long-time patron of the Sport Writers Association of Ghana.

== Personal life ==
She was married to Enoch Kwabena Okoh, Head of Civil Service in the Kwame Nkrumah regime in the 1960s, and had three children: E. Kwasi Okoh, Stanley Kwame Okoh and Theodosia Amma Jones-Quartey.

Her grandson is Ian Jones-Quartey, creator of OK K.O.! Let's Be Heroes, and her granddaughter-in-law is Rebecca Sugar, creator of Steven Universe.

== Death ==
She died on 19 April 2015 at the Narh-Bita Hospital in Tema after a short illness, aged 92. President John Dramani Mahama directed that all flags should fly at half-mast for three days, starting from Tuesday, 21 April, in her honour. A statement signed by Minister of Communications Edward Omane Boamah said that the directive was "in honour of this extraordinary Ghanaian", further stating: "Government acknowledges Mrs. Okoh for her invaluable contributions to our nation building efforts. The instant recognition that our nation receives the world over through the unique flag that she designed for us has cemented her place in history as a colossus of Ghanaian history.... Her talent, zeal and sense of duty to Ghana will continue to offer inspiration for Ghanaians and serve as a reference point in service to the nation."

She was given a state funeral on 28 May, with final rites held in the forecourt of the State House, Accra.

== Awards and honours ==
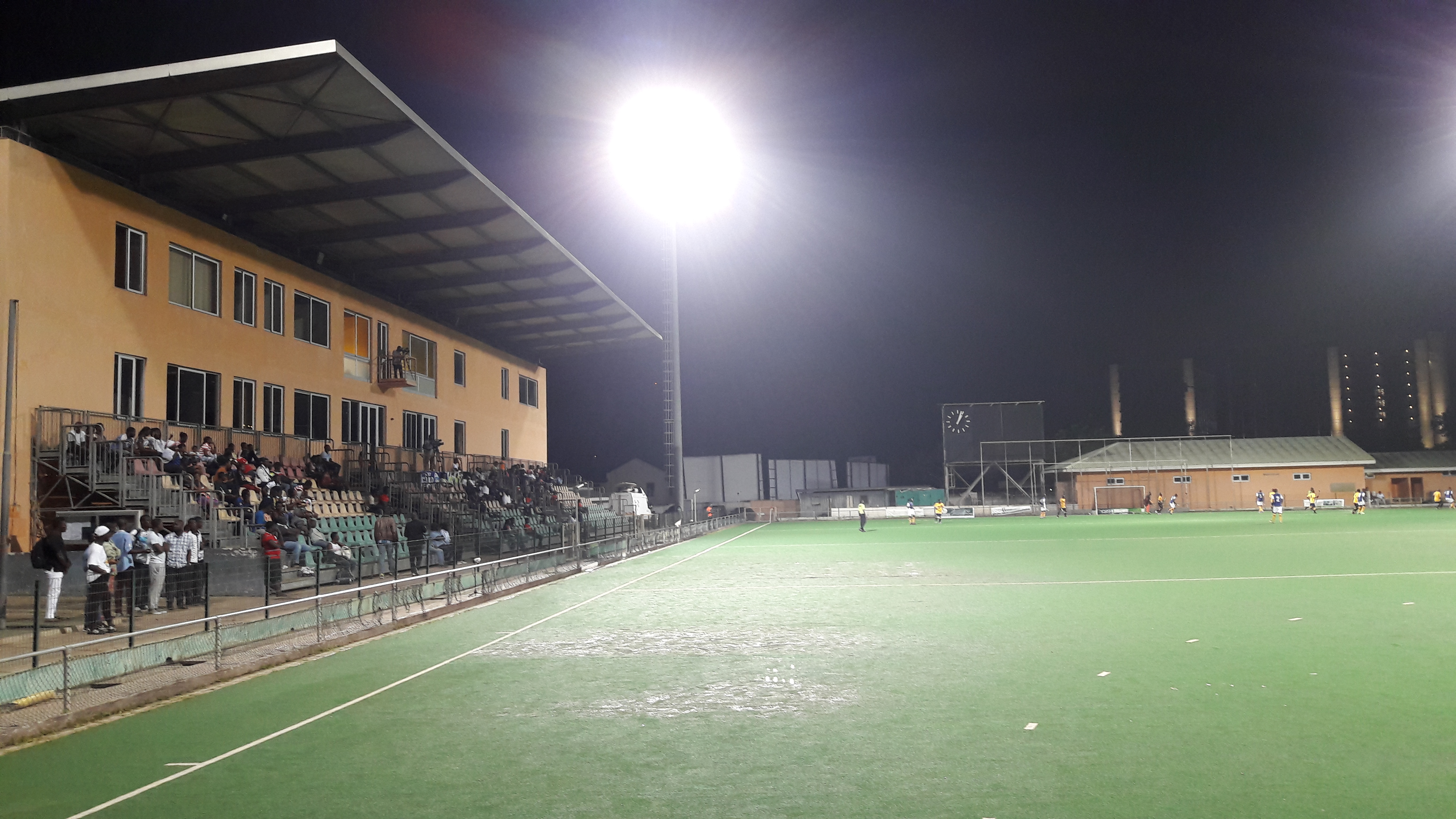

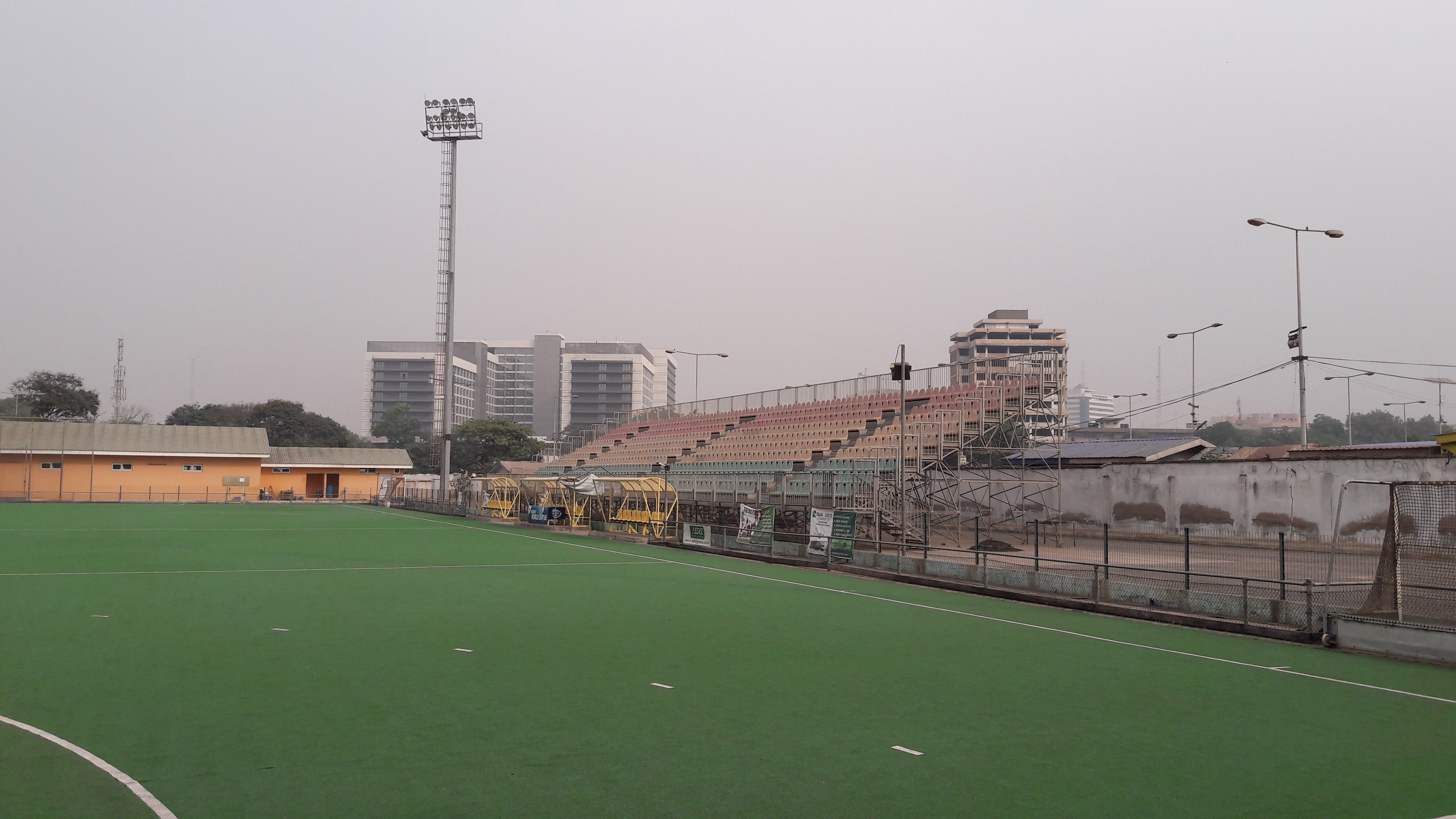
Theodosia Okoh Hockey Stadium

Theodosia Okoh was awarded the Grand Medal (GM) by the nation, and a number of awards from other institutions in the country. She received a citation from the Ghana Broadcasting Corporation and the National Sports Awards in 2004, as well as an award from the Sport Writers Association of Ghana and an award from the TV Africa series Obaa Mbo.

On 13 June 2016, a Google Doodle commemorated what would have been her 94th birthday.

== Legacy ==
- The Accra hockey pitch is named after her in recognition of her contribution to the game, and in 2013 a resolution was overturned to rename the Theodosia Okoh Hockey Stadium. She had lamented the change from her name (to "John Evans Atta Mills National Hockey Stadium") while she was still alive, but was satisfied that President John Mahama acted speedily to reverse it.
- The Asuogyaman District Assembly in the Eastern Region has erected a bust in her honour at Anum, her hometown.
- Okoh's grandson, animator/director Ian Jones-Quartey, based the character Nanefua Pizza in the Cartoon Network animated show Steven Universe on her.
