= La Dade Kotopon =

Ghana parliament constituency

- constituency for the Parliament of Ghana
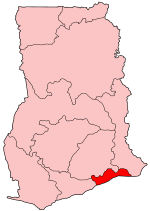
- District: Accra Metropolitan Area
- Region: Greater Accra Region of Ghana

Current constituency
- Party: National Democratic Congress
- MP: Hon. Rita Naa Odoley Sowah

La Dade Kotopon is one of the constituencies represented in the Parliament of Ghana. It elects one Member of Parliament (MP) by the first past the post system of election. The Dade Kotopon constituency is located in the Greater Accra Region of Ghana.

== Members of Parliament ==
Election	Member	Party
1992	Lemuel Nii-Amon Kotei	National Convention Party
1996	Sylvester A. Mensah	National Democratic Congress
2000	Godfried Ako-Nai	New Patriotic Party
2004	Nii Amasah Namoale	National Democratic Congress
2016	Vincent Sowah Odotei	New Patriotic Party
2021	Rita Naa Odoley Sowah	National Democratic Congress

== Elections ==
2016 Ghanaian parliamentary election: Dade Kotopon Constituency Sources:Peace Fm Online
Party	Candidate	Votes	%	±%
New Patriotic Party	VINCENT SOWAH ODOTEI	40,126	50.58	
National Democratic Congress	Nii Amasah Namoale	38,504	48.54	
Convention People's Party	Cynthia Akua Mensah	697	0.88	

2012 Ghanaian parliamentary election: Dade Kotopon Constituency Sources:Peace Fm Online
Party	Candidate	Votes	%	±%
National Democratic Congress	Nii Amasah Namoale	50,016	56.91	
New Patriotic Party	OSCAR NII ODOI GLOVERNPP	34,533	39.29	
Progressive People's Party	SIMON SOWAH PPP	1,868	2.13	
Convention People's Party	TORTO O NABI ADJAH	1,339	1.52	
Independent	ERIC KODI	134	0.15%	

2008 Ghanaian parliamentary election: Dade Kotopon Constituency Sources:Ghana Home Page
Party	Candidate	Votes	%	±%
National Democratic Congress	Nii Amasah Namoale	42,678	57.3	
New Patriotic Party	Francis Nii Annan Sowah	30,077	40.4	
Convention People's Party	Cynthia Akua Mensah	1,744	2.3	

== See also ==
- List of Ghana Parliament constituencies
