= Coat of arms of Ghana =

- Armiger: Republic of Ghana
- Adopted: 4 March 1957
- Crest: A black star bordered in gold
- Torse: Gold, green and red
- Shield: Azure on a cross vert fimbriated Or a lion passant guardant Or, in the first quarter a linguist's staff and ceremonial sword crossed in saltire Or, in the second quarter issuant from five bars wavy Argent and Azure a castle Argent upon a mount Or, in the third quarter affixed in a grassy plain a cocoa tree proper and in the fourth quarter upon a grassy plain a mine proper.
- Supporters: Two eagles displayed Or around each of whose neck hangs a black star fimbriated Or suspended from a ribbon tierced gules, Or and vert upon a grassy compartment proper
- Motto: Freedom and Justice
- Earlier version(s): Gold Coast
- Use: 1877-1957
- Designer: Nii Amon Kotei

The coat of arms of Ghana was designed by Ghanaian artist Nii Amon Kotei and was introduced on 4 March 1957.

== Description ==
- The first quarter, on the upper left shows a machete used by chiefs, and a staff, used by the linguist (known as an okyeame in Akan), at ceremonies. It is a symbol for the traditional authority of Ghana.
- The second quarter shows a representation of Osu Castle on the sea, the presidential palace on the Gulf of Guinea, symbolises the national government.
- The third quarter of the shield shows a cocoa tree, which embodies the agricultural wealth of Ghana.
- The fourth quarter shows a gold mine, which stands for the richness of industrial minerals and natural resources in Ghana.
- A gold lion centred on a green St George's Cross with gold fimbriation on the field of blue, represents the continuing link between Ghana and the Commonwealth of Nations.
- The crest is a Black star of Africa with gold outline, upon a torse in the national colours.
- Supporting the shield are two golden Tawny eagles, with the Order of the Star of Ghana suspended from their necks.
- The compartment upon which the supporters stand is composed of a grassy field, under which a scroll bears the national motto of Ghana: Freedom and Justice. The shield stands for a weapon which helps to fight poverty, ignorance and hunger.

== History ==
=== British Gold Coast ===
1821-1837

1837-1877

=== Danish Gold Coast ===
1658-1699.

1699-1819.

1819-1855.

=== Dutch Gold Coast ===
1612-1665.

1665-1795.

1795-1802.

1802-1806.

1808-1810.

1810-1814.

1814-1815.

1815-1872.

=== English Gold Coast ===
1631-1637.

1663-1688.

1694-1700.

=== Brandenburger/Prussian Gold Coast ===
1682-1688

1688-1721

=== Portuguese Gold Coast ===
1482-1557.

1557-1578.

1578-1580.

1580-1640.

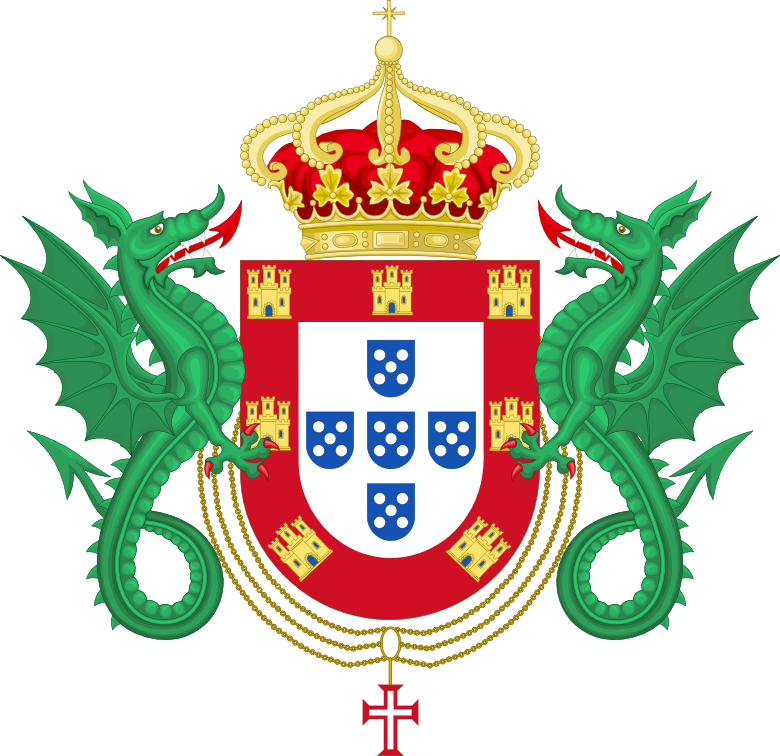
1640-1642.

=== Swedish Gold Coast ===
1650-1654.

1654-1663.
