= Kaya Forson =

Ghanaian swimmer

Kaya Adwoa Forson
Personal information
- Born: 19 March 2002 (age 24) Canada

Sport
- Sport: Swimming
- Event(s): 200m freestyle 200m backstroke

Kaya Adwoa Forson (born 19 March 2002) is a Ghanaian swimmer. She competed in the 200 metre freestyle and 200 metre backstroke at the 2015 World Championships in Kazan, Russia. Aged just 13, she was the youngest competitor at the World Championships. Forson lives in Málaga, Spain.

Forson represented Ghana in the 200 metre freestyle at the 2016 Summer Olympics in Rio de Janeiro, Brazil. Forson and male swimmer Abeiku Jackson, who competed in the 50 metre freestyle in Rio, became the first Ghanaians ever to compete in swimming at the Olympic Games.

== Education ==
She is studying at the Lycée Français International de Malaga and trains with the Real Club Mediterráneo de Málaga.

== Competitions ==
- 2016: Forson represented Ghana in the 200 metre freestyle at the 2016 Summer Olympics in Rio de Janeiro, Brazil.

== Competition record ==
Year	Competition	Venue	Position	Event	Notes
Representing Ghana
2015	World Championships	Kazan, Russia	61st	200m freestyle	2:23.72
2015	World Championships	Kazan, Russia	44th	200m backstroke	2:43.94
2016	Olympic Games	Rio de Janeiro, Brazil	42nd	200m freestyle	2:16.02
