= Vincent Sowah Odotei =

Ghanaian politician

Vincent Sowah Odotei MP

Deputy Minister of Communications
- In office March 2017 – April 2020
- President: Nana Akufo-Addo
- Succeeded by: Alex Kodwo Kom Abban

Personal details
- Born: La-Accra, Greater Accra, Ghana
- Party: New Patriotic Party
- Children: 3
- Occupation: Varied Profession
- Cabinet: Minister

Vincent Sowah Odotei is a Ghanaian politician and a former Member of Parliament for La Dadekotopon in the Greater Accra Region of Ghana. He is a member of the New Patriotic Party and was the deputy minister for communications in Ghana until his appointment was terminated on April 6, 2020, by President Nana Akufo-Addo.

He defeated Hon. Nii Amasah Namoale in the 2016 elections.

== Early life and education ==
Vincent Odotei was born on 5 May 1968 in Accra. He holds a B.A from the University of Ghana and a postgraduate diploma from the Graduate School of Business, University of Strathclyde, Scotland.

== Personal life ==
Vincent Osei Odotei is a Christian.

== Current involvement ==
Vincent Sowah Odotei was at the World Summit Awards Grand Jury held in Accra, Ghana, held from November 3, 2018, to November 7, 2018, where he expressed his ministry's willingness to partner with the private sector for development.

== Politics ==
Hon. Vincent Odotei is a member of the New Patriotic Party and was a member of parliament for Dade Kotopon in the Greater Accra Region in the Seventh Parliament of the Fourth Republic of Ghana.

=== 2016 election ===
Odotei contested the Dade kotopon constituency parliamentary seat on the ticket of the New Patriotic Party during the 2016 Ghanaian general election and won with 40,126 votes, representing 50.58% of the total votes. He was elected over Nii Amasah Namoale of the National Democratic Congress, who polled 38,504 votes, which is equivalent to 48.54%, and the parliamentary candidate for the Convention People's Party, Cynthia Akua Mensah, had 697 votes, representing 0.88% of the total votes.
