= Union of African States =

Ghana-Guinea-Mali Union (1961–1963)

Union of African States Union des États africains
- Flag (1961–1963)

- Map of UAS members, shown in green.
- Formation: 23 November 1958
- Dissolved: 3 June 1963
- Type: Regional organization
- Headquarters: Accra, Ghana
- Region served: West Africa
- Members: 3 states: Ghana; Guinea; Mali (joined in 1961)

Flag (1958–1961)

The Union of African States (French: Union des États africains), sometimes called the Ghana–Guinea–Mali Union, was a short-lived and loose regional organization formed in 1958 linking the West African nations of Ghana and Guinea as the Union of Independent African States. Mali joined in 1961. It disbanded in 1963.

The union planned to develop a common currency and unified foreign policy amongst members; however, none of these proposals were implemented by the countries. The union was the first organization in Africa to bring together former colonies of the British and the French. Although the union was open to all independent states in Africa, no other states joined. The union had a limited impact on politics as there was never any administration or permanent meetings to support the goals of unity. Its legacy was largely limited to longstanding political relationships between Ghana and Mali.

== President and Prime Minister ==
Kwame Nkrumah (Prime Minister of Ghana 1957–1960, then President from 1960), Ahmed Sékou Touré (President of Guinea 1958–1984), and Modibo Keïta (President of Mali 1960–1968). The union again came into the news when Nkrumah was named as the co-president of Guinea after he was deposed as President of Ghana by a military coup in 1966.

#	Name (Birth–Death)	Took office	Left office
Ghana–Guinea–Mali Union
1	Kwame Nkrumah	23 November 1958	1963
2	Ahmed Sékou Touré	1958	1963
3	Modibo Keïta	1958	1963
Ghana–Guinea–Mali

== Background ==
The colonies of Guinea, the Gold Coast (which became Ghana), and French Sudan (which became Mali) followed different paths toward decolonization. French Sudan and Guinea were both French colonies and thus after the May 1958 crisis were given the chance to vote for immediate independence or to join a reorganized French Community (which would grant domestic autonomy while maintaining French defense and economic policy). Guinea voted for full independence (the only French colony in Africa to do so) while French Sudan voted to join the French Community. The Gold Coast, in contrast, was a British colony which achieved independence as Ghana in March 1957 and joined the Commonwealth of Nations.

The difference continued into the post-independence era. The French government, with urging from the Ivory Coast, began a complete withdrawal of French personnel from Guinea and a suspension of aid when the country declared independence. This resulted in economic turmoil throughout the country and sent a warning against independence for the other colonies. French Sudan joined with Senegal to form the Mali Federation for a few months in 1960. However, political intractability led to the dissolution of the Mali Federation in August 1960. Ghana, in contrast, was presented as a success story of the decolonization period in Africa with a booming economy and the recognition from international organizations for its astute fiscal management.

Despite these differences, the leaders of the three countries shared a common vision of Africa's future. Kwame Nkrumah, Ahmed Sékou Touré, and Modibo Keïta were each pivotal anti-colonial figures in their countries and the first leaders after independence. In addition, each became prominent in the Pan-African movement and were architects in developing a theory of African socialism. (Note: Historian John Donnelly Fage categorizes the three leaders together as the "radical West African leaders" in the independence era.)

The motivation for creating a federation was to reduce the dependence of the states to the former colonial powers. Large size would reduce the economic vulnerability of the states, improve economic development programs, and reduce interference by foreign powers. The ultimate goal of Ghana-Mali-Guinea federation was for more African states to join the union; however between 1963 and 1965, most African states preferred the organization Organization of African Unity over a formal union. Nkrumah was influenced by the United States as a successful model for how to organize an African federation.

== Mutual assistance ==
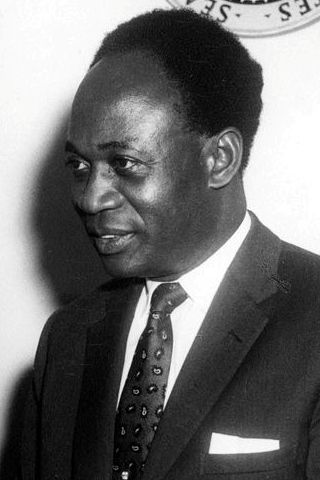
Kwame Nkrumah, first President of Ghana and major leader in the Union of African States

In November 1958, with the sudden cessation of French aid and personnel for Guinea, Nkrumah and Touré met in Conakry, the capital of Guinea, to discuss an emergency loan that Ghana was going to provide to Guinea. On 23 November, the two leaders announced a plan for the creation of a union of African states, which the two leaders would work towards over a series of meetings with the loan as the first of many steps towards integration. Following these negotiations, the Union of Independent African States (UIAS) was declared on 1 May 1959. The agreement was very loose, only requiring that the members work together on relations with other African countries and thus was, in the words of journalist Russel Warren Howe, more pragmatic than ambitious. They declared intentions for developing a shared currency (a union bank and union economic council were planned) and shared citizenship, but did not include unified defense or foreign policy provisions in regards to countries outside of Africa. Despite these declarations, little happened to cement any shared currency or create unified citizenship between the two countries in 1958 or 1959. The only significant effect of the union was the £10 million (about £204 million today (Note: UK Consumer Price Index inflation figures from 1209–2024 based on data from "Inflation calculator". Bank of England. London. 18 February 2026.)) loan provided by Ghana to Guinea. However, even this relationship was hesitantly agreed to by the members. Guinea used less than half of the funds provided by Ghana despite its continued economic problems.

The individual constitutions of Ghana, Mali and Guinea contained provisions that would allow the national parliaments to transfer the sovereignty of the whole or part of each country; the intent was to easily form a Union of African States.

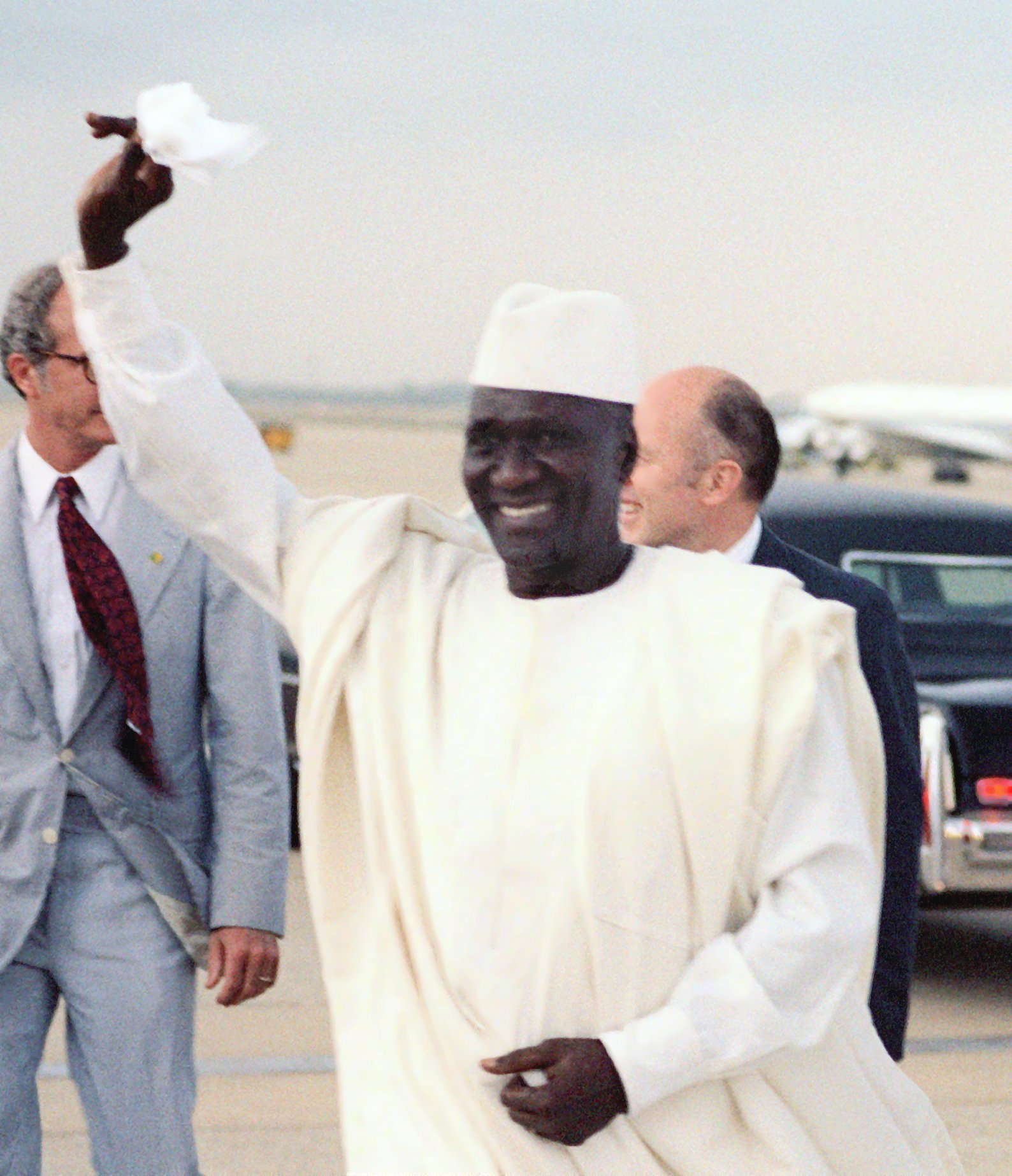
Ahmed Sékou Touré, First President of Guinea

In November 1960, following the tense end of the Mali Federation in August, talks begun between the two original members with Mali to join an expanded union. These negotiations reached fruition on 1 July 1961 when the charter of the newly named Union of African States was published simultaneously in the capitals of the three members. The charter of the union provided for collective security (the agreement that an attack on any of the three countries would be an attack on all) and shared diplomatic, economic, educational, and cultural activities. The union remained loose but the leaders believed it would set the ground for a larger and stronger union between members. At the signing ceremony on 1 July, Nkrumah declared that the union would be "a nucleus of a United States of Africa". Diplomatically, the union became a key part of the Casablanca group and the three members agreed to push for similar policy issue within that forum. Similarly, the leaders approached Cold War politics in a similar manner, promoting a pro-Soviet involvement in the Non-Aligned Movement. Although Mali and Ghana had discussed creating a shared parliament, such a provision was not contained in the final agreement. Other issues, such as the creation of a single flag for all three countries, a unified economic policy, a unified foreign policy, and the development of a common constitution were mentioned but not provided with details and were to be worked out by regular meetings of the three leaders. (Note: Although no common flag was decided on by the members in this declaration, a flag for the union was decided to be based on the Ghanaian flag, but "with as many black stars as there are members".) No administration was ever established and the only regular governance of the union was set to be meetings between the three leaders of the members.

The union was confronted by a series of significant problems from its establishment. Ghana was separated from Guinea by the country of Ivory Coast and separated from Mali by the country of Upper Volta. (Note: This geographic division between the countries was emphasized in the 1 July ceremonies which included the first radiotelephone call between Mali and Guinea, but did not include Ghana because the connections were not yet constructed to enable such a transmission.) Attempts to bridge this gap by including Upper Volta in the union failed, despite a number of overtures by Nkrumah. In one meeting between Maurice Yaméogo, the president of Upper Volta, and Nkrumah the two pledged to work together toward "effective unity of Africa" and together knocked down a wall constructed specifically for the ceremony. Similarly, although Mali and Guinea share a border, there had been little creation of significant transportation infrastructure between the countries (both of them being more significantly linked to Senegal during the colonial period). Another problem was that the countries had separate linguistic and colonial infrastructures, which limited the space for any significant policy unification. In addition, although the parties agreed on many foreign policy goals, they were divided about United Nations Operation in the Congo in 1960 and 1961. Finally, although the agreement was open to all African states, suspicion about Nkrumah and regional politics between the three leaders and Félix Houphouët-Boigny in the Ivory Coast limited the union's expansion.

The economic council never got started and only a few meetings were held between the three leaders. Tensions increased between the members in 1963 with the 1963 Togolese coup d'état: Nkrumah was accused of having supported the coup. In the preparation for the Addis Ababa summit to found the Organization of African Unity, Touré was upset with Nkrumah for pursuing an agenda without consultation of the other members. The union was dissolved without much attention in May 1963.

Different explanations have been offered for the failure of the UAS, such as competing nationalisms and intrinsic flaws in the U.S. model of federation that Nkrumah was influenced by. Adom Getachew argues that the failure was caused by "deep disagreements about the precise balance between federal union and independence of member states." Nkrumah advocated for a strong federal state capable of major economic development projects.

== Legacy ==
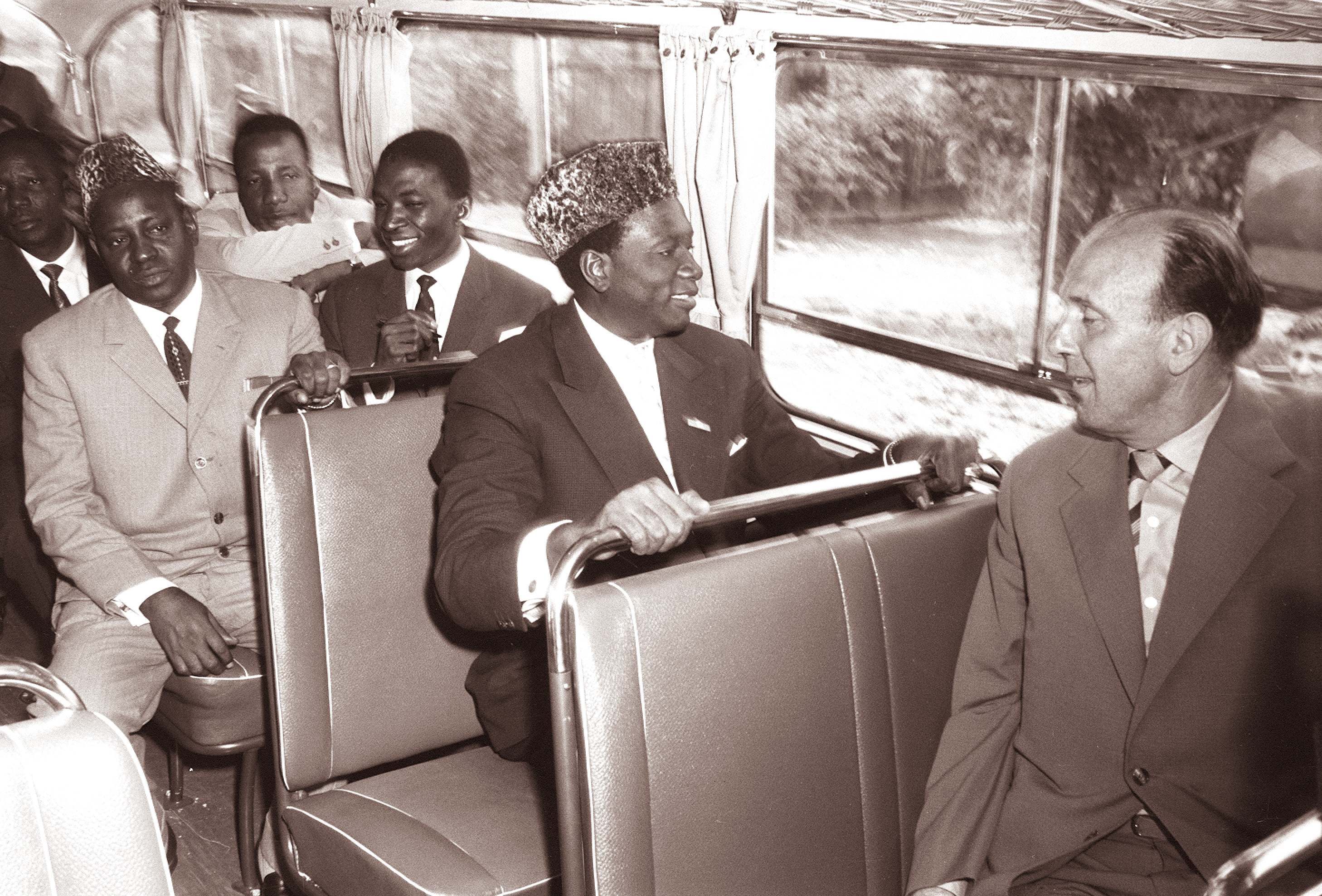
Modibo Keïta, the first President of Mali

The political alliance between the three leaders was the most significant legacy of the union. Ghana, Guinea, and Mali remained tightly connected until Nkrumah was removed from power by a military coup in 1966. As an example of this continuing relationship, the Ghanaian ambassador to Mali retained the title of "Resident Minister" even after the political union had dissolved.

The union again became important in 1966 when Nkrumah was removed as the President of Ghana by a military coup while he was in People's Republic of China dealing with peace talks about the Vietnam War. After the coup, he could not return to Ghana and so instead came to Guinea where he was greeted ceremoniously by Touré who declared that Nkrumah was now the head of state of Guinea and the Secretary General of the Democratic Party of Guinea. Touré declared that "If there were a conference of African heads of state tomorrow, Comrade Nkrumah would speak in the name of Guinea, because Nkrumah is not a simple African but a universal man." The U.S. State Department was incredulous at the time about whether this naming of Nkrumah as president of the country was genuine and the declaration of Nkrumah as the co-president of Guinea with Touré is often considered to be an honorific title.

== Population and area of members ==
Country	Area (km^{2})	Population (in millions, 1960)
Mali	1,240,192	5.2637
Ghana	238,535	6.6352
Guinea	245,857	3.4942
Total	1,724,584	15.393
