= Flag of Ghana =

- Use: National flag, civil and state ensign
- Proportion: 2:3
- Adopted: 6 March 1957; 69 years ago
- Design: A horizontal triband of the Ethiopian Pan-African colors of red, gold, and green, charged with a black star in the centre
- Designed by: Theodosia Okoh
- Use: Civil ensign
- Proportion: 2:3
- Design: A red field with the national flag, fimbriated in black, in the canton
- Use: Naval ensign
- Proportion: 2:3
- Design: Red English St. George's Cross on white, with the national flag in canton.

The national flag of Ghana consists of a horizontal triband of red, yellow, and green with a black five-pointed star in the center taking up all of the width of the yellow stripe, touching the red and green stripes. It replaced the British Gold Coast's Blue Ensign.

The flag, which was adopted upon the independence of the Dominion of Ghana on 6 March 1957, was designed that same year by Theodosia Okoh, a renowned Ghanaian artist and teacher. The flag was flown from the time of Ghana's independence until 1962, then reinstated in 1966 after Kwame Nkrumah was overthrown by a coup d'état in February 1966. The flag of Ghana consists of the Ethiopian Pan-African colours of red, gold, and green in horizontal stripes with a black five-pointed star in the centre of the gold stripe. The Ghanaian flag was the second African flag after the flag of the Ethiopian Empire to feature the red, gold, and green colours, although these colours are inverted. The design of the Ghanaian flag influenced the designs of the flags of Guinea-Bissau (1973) and São Tomé and Príncipe (1975).

== Design ==
The Ghanaian flag was designed as a tricolour of red, gold and green with a black star in the centre.

The red colour of the flag represents the blood of forefathers who led the struggle of independence from British colonial rule. This fight against colonial rule claimed the lives of many civilians as well as notable traditional and political leaders.

The gold colour represents the wealth imbued by mineral resources mostly found in Obuasi in Ashanti Region and Tarkwa in the Western Region. The gold in Ghana led to the initial name of the Gold Coast, which was later changed to Ghana upon independence in 1957. Ghana's other mineral resources are diamond, bauxite, and manganese.

The green symbolises Ghana's forests and natural wealth which provide the nation with oil, food, and crops such as cocoa, timber, Shea Butter. Most of Ghana's crops are exported to overseas countries in exchange for physical cash which is used for the country's development of roads, schools, water, sanitation and industries for employment.

The black star of the Ghanaian national flag is a symbol for the emancipation of Africa and unity against colonialism. The black star was adopted from the flag of the Black Star Line, a shipping line incorporated by Marcus Garvey which operated from 1919 to 1922. It became also known as the Black Star of Africa. It is also where the Ghana national football team derived their nickname, the "Black Stars".

| Colour scheme | Red | Yellow | Green | Black |
|---|---|---|---|---|
| CMYK | 0-96-84-19 | 0-17-94-1 | 100-0-43-58 | 100-100-100-99 |
| HEX | #CF0921 | #FCD20F | #006B3D | #000000 |
| RGB | 207-9-33 | 252-210-15 | 0-107-61 | 0-0-0 |

Flag construction sheet

== Purpose and use ==
The purpose of the Ghanaian national flag was to be a symbol of jubilation during the post-independence era. There were many flags ensembled for Ghana's use. Notably, the Ghanaian national flag described which has been used for many purposes in national and international celebrations, such as the Independence Day Celebration, commemoration of Ghana's Big Six and past leaders of the nations. The flag is raised up flying in the sky to grace glorious occasions while it is usually lowered to fly halfway to show some kind of misfortune that may have hit on the country.

== Other national flags ==
=== National ensign ===
Under terms of section 183 of Ghana's Merchant Shipping Act of 1963, the civil ensign is a red flag with the national flag in a black-fimbriated canton. In 2003, a new merchant shipping act was enacted, however, and this simply provides that "the National Flag of Ghana" is the proper national colours for Ghanaian ships. No mention is made of other flags or other possible flags.

The naval ensign is a red St. George's Cross on white flag, with the national flag in canton.

=== Air force ensign and civil air ensign ===
The ensign of the Ghana Air Force

The Ghanaian civil air ensign

The Ghana Air Force has its own ensign that incorporates the flag of Ghana. Civil aviation in Ghana is represented by the national civil air ensign. It is a standard light-blue field with the Ghanaian flag in the canton. It is charged in the fly with either a red, yellow and green roundel (in the case of the military ensign) or black five-pointed star (in the case of the civil ensign). Both have been used since Independence in 1957, and the subsequent founding of the Ghana Air Force in 1959.

== History ==
Flag of the Gold Coast, the forerunner to Ghana. Used until 1957.

First flag of the Union of African States with Guinea, used between 1958 and 1961.

Second flag of the Union of African States, used between 1961 and 1963 (after Mali joined).

Ghana national flag (1964–66).

Flag of the Presidency of Ghana since 1966. Presidential Standard of Ghana; replicate of the national flag of Ghana with a gold rim.

House flag of Ghana's former national shipping carrier, the Black Star Line

The Ghanaian government flag was designed by Theodosia Salome Abena Kumea Okoh, a renowned Ghanaian artist who has contested and showcased her artistic internationally. She joined the Ghana Hockey Association (GHA) and worked in the role of a chairperson. She was also a patron of the Sports Writer's Association of Ghana (SWAG).

It was adopted in 1957 and flown until 1962. Similarly, when the country formed the Union of African States, the flag of the Union was modeled on Bolivia's flag, but with two black stars, representing the nations. In May 1959, a third star was added.

Following the January 1964 constitutional referendum, Ghana adopted a variant of the 1957 tricolour with white in the place of yellow, after the colours of Kwame Nkrumah's ruling and then-sole legal party Convention People's Party, making it similar to the flag of Hungary. The original 1957 flag was reinstated in February 1966 following Nkrumah's overthrow in the February 1966 coup d'état.

When the flag was changed in 1964, popular public demand upon the remembrance of Ghana's rich history agitated for the nation to revert to its use of the original Ghanaian national flag with the red, gold and green colour. The original Ghana national flag which was used in 1957 upon Ghana's independence was reinstated for use in 1966. Ghana was then one of the first countries to adopt the Pan African colours originally used in the Ethiopian flag.

== See also ==
- List of Ghana flags
