= Ghana at the 2011 World Aquatics Championships =

Sporting event delegation

Ghana competed at the 2011 World Aquatics Championships in Shanghai, China between July 16 and 31, 2011.

Because the Ghana Olympic Committee is suspended by the International Olympic Committee, Ghanaian athletes participated as Athletes from Ghana under the flag of FINA.

== Swimming ==
Ghana qualified 1 swimmer.

Women

Athlete	Event	Heats		Semifinals		Final	
Athlete	Event	Time	Rank	Time	Rank	Time	Rank
Ophelia Swyne	Women's 50m Freestyle	DNS		did not advance			
