= Elizabeth Nyanibah =

Ghanaian mother of Kwame Nkrumah (c. 1877–c. 1977)

- Born: c. 1877; Tarkwa-Nsuaem, Western Region, Gold Coast (now Ghana)
- Died: c. 1977 (aged ~100); Nkroful, Western Region, Ghana
- Other name: Nyaniba
- Occupations: Petty trader, fishmonger
- Known for: Mother of Kwame Nkrumah; Nyaniba Estate named in her honour
- Spouse: Kofi Nwiana Ngolomah
- Children: Kwame Nkrumah

Elizabeth Nyanibah (also spelled Nyaniba; c. 1877 – c. 1977) was the mother of Kwame Nkrumah, the first President of Ghana. She raised Nkrumah in the town of Nkroful. Nyaniba Estate in Osu, Accra, was named after her.

== Early life ==
Nyanibah was born around 1877 in Tarkwa-Nsuaem, in what is now Ghana's Western Region. She belonged to the Agona family and worked as a petty trader and fishmonger. She later married Kofi Nwiana Ngolomah, a goldsmith from Nkroful in Nzema East, now Ellembele.

== Motherhood and relationship with Kwame Nkrumah ==
Nyanibah gave birth to Kwame Nkrumah in September 1909, though some sources list 1912 as his birth year. After her husband moved to another village, she raised Nkrumah in Nkroful. In his autobiography, Nkrumah described their relationship as close, writing: "I never cared for any woman as much as I cared for her. We are both alike in one thing. We seem to draw strength from each other."

== Later life ==
Nyanibah lived to be over 100 years old. According to the New York times, she lost her sight in later years but maintained her ability to speak clearly and recall events. She spent her later life in Nkroful and was present during events related to her son's legacy, including the period following his death in 1972.

== Legacy ==
The Nyaniba Estate in Osu, Accra, was named after her by President Nkrumah. In 2014, calls were made by local leaders and cultural advocates for the government to further honour her, including naming the Nkroful Agricultural Senior High School after her.

== See also ==
- Kwame Nkrumah
