= Kwame Nkrumah Festival =

Festival in Ghana in honor of Kwame Nkrumah

The Kwame Nkrumah Pan-African Intellectual Cultural Festival, better known as the Kwame Nkrumah Festival (KNF), is a festival organized by the Kwame Nkrumah Chair at the Institute of African Studies in the University of Ghana.

== History ==
The festival was first held in September 2010 to honor Kwame Nkrumah's dedication to cultural and intellectual activity centered in Africa.

== 3rd Kwame Nkrumah Festival ==
The 3rd Kwame Nkrumah Festival was curated by the 4th Kwame Nkrumah Chair, Amina Mama. It was a Pan-African curation of alternative culture, ideas and alternative ways of doing business. Its goal was to advance a new and liberating Pan-African cultural economy that will serve the material interests of Africans. The festival took place as the COVID-19 pandemic swept Africa and this was the first to be digitally curated, hosted fully online and globally broadcast. The festival was embraced as an opportunity for positive action to lift and re-energise our collective pan-African morale and advance pan-African digitalization while celebrating the legacy of Kwame Nkrumah.

During the 10 days of activities it was visited by over 6,000 visitors from 103 countries, more than half of whom came from 48 of Africa's 54 nations. The festival has since turned it into a digital archive to serve as a Pan-African knowledge resource. The contents include the latest intellectual and political dialogues among pan-Africanist feminist, youths and other Information Age groups and movements dedicated to bringing about positive change.
