= Kwame Nkrumah =

Ghanaian politician (1909–1972)

His Excellency The Right Honourable Osagyefo Kwame Nkrumah
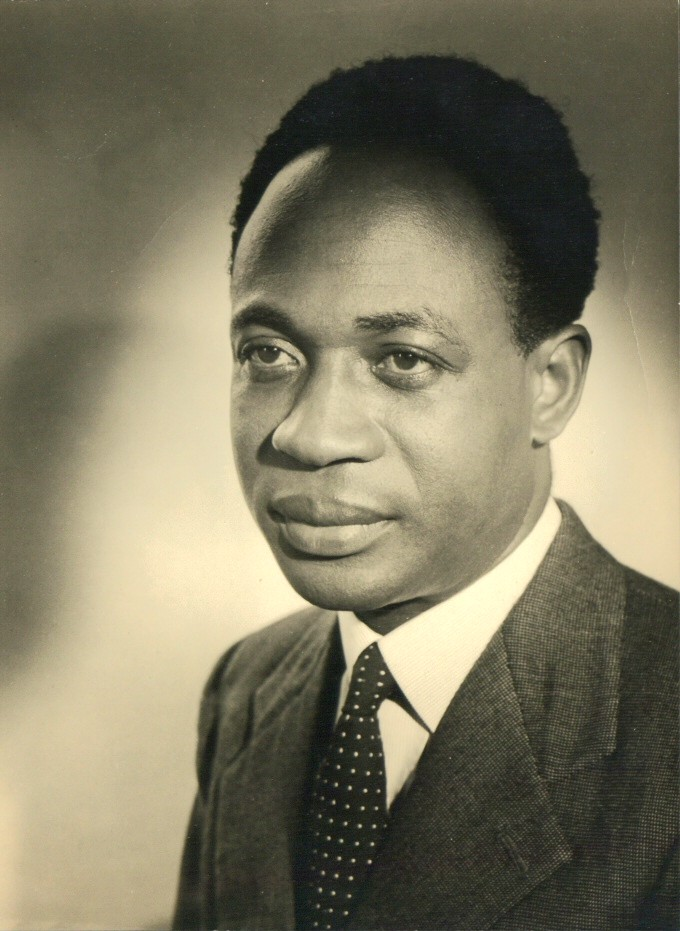
- Portrait of Nkrumah

1st President of Ghana
- In office 1 July 1960 – 24 February 1966
- Preceded by: Office established
- Succeeded by: Joseph Arthur Ankrah as Chairman of the NLC

3rd Chairperson of the Organisation of African Unity
- In office 21 October 1965 – 24 February 1966
- Preceded by: Gamal Abdel Nasser
- Succeeded by: Joseph Arthur Ankrah

1st Prime Minister of Ghana
- In office 6 March 1957 – 1 July 1960
- Monarch: Elizabeth II
- Governors-General: Charles Arden-Clarke; The Lord Listowel
- Preceded by: Himself as Prime Minister of the Gold Coast
- Succeeded by: Himself as President

1st Prime Minister of the Gold Coast
- In office 21 March 1952 – 6 March 1957
- Monarch: Elizabeth II
- Governor-General: Charles Arden-Clarke
- Preceded by: Office established
- Succeeded by: Himself as Prime Minister of Ghana

Personal details
- Born: Francis Nwia Kofi Nkrumah; 21 September 1909 Nkroful, Colony of the Gold Coast
- Died: 27 April 1972 (aged 62) Bucharest, Socialist Republic of Romania
- Resting place: Kwame Nkrumah Memorial Park; Accra, Ghana
- Party: UGCC (1947–1949); CPP (1949–1966)
- Spouse: Fathia Rizk (m. 1957)
- Children: 4, including Gamal and Samia
- Parent: Elizabeth Nyanibah (mother)
- Education: Lincoln University (BA, BTh); University of Pennsylvania (MA, MS)
- Occupation: Politician, political theorist and revolutionary
- Awards: Lenin Peace Prize (1962)

Kwame Nkrumah (born Francis Nwia Kofi Nkrumah /(ə)nˈkruːmə/ (ə)n-KROO-mə; 21 September 1909 – 27 April 1972) was a Ghanaian politician, political theorist and revolutionary. He served as Prime Minister of the Gold Coast from 1952 until 1957, when it gained independence from the United Kingdom. He was then the first prime minister and then the president when the country became Ghana from 1957 until he was deposed in 1966 in a coup d'état. An influential advocate of Pan-Africanism, Nkrumah was a founding member of the Organisation of African Unity (OAU) and winner of the Lenin Peace Prize from the Soviet Union in 1962.

After twelve early years abroad pursuing higher education, developing his political philosophy, and organising with other diasporic pan-Africanists, Nkrumah returned to the Gold Coast to begin his political career as an advocate of national independence. He formed the Convention People's Party, which achieved rapid success through its unprecedented appeal to the common voter. He became prime minister in 1952 and retained the position when he led Ghana to independence from the United Kingdom in 1957, a first in sub-Saharan Africa at the time. In 1960, Ghanaians approved a new constitution and elected Nkrumah as president.

His administration was primarily socialist as well as nationalist. It funded national industrial and energy projects, developed a strong national education system and promoted a pan-Africanist culture. Nkrumah had a vision to consolidate African countries under a single continental leadership (that was socialist in nature) with himself as president of this bloc. Under Nkrumah, Ghana played a leading role in African international relations and the Pan-Africanist movement during Africa's decolonisation period, supporting numerous liberation struggles. The anti-socialist Western nations saw the Kwame Nkrumah Ideological Institute (KNII) as a sympathetic base for military support to African nationalists and hence as a problematic threat.

After an alleged assassination plot against him, coupled with increasingly difficult local economic conditions, Nkrumah's government became increasingly authoritarian in the 1960s, as he repressed political opposition and conducted elections that were neither free nor fair. In 1964, a constitutional amendment made Ghana a one-party state, with Nkrumah as president for life of both the nation and its party. He fostered a personality cult, forming ideological institutes and adopting the title of "Osagyefo." The KNII served the purpose of spreading propaganda and the ideology of Nkrumah's own version of scientific socialism known as Nkrumaism. Nkrumah was deposed in 1966 in a coup d'état by the National Liberation Council. Complicity on the part of the United States' Central Intelligence Agency has been claimed, including by former agents, but never fully verified. Nkrumah lived the rest of his life in Guinea, where he was named honorary co-president. In 1999, he was voted BBC African of the millennium.

== Early life and education ==
=== Gold Coast ===
Kwame Nkrumah was born on Saturday, 21 September 1909 in Nkroful, Nzema East, (now Ellembele), Gold Coast (now Ghana). Nkroful was a small village in the Nzema area, in the southwest of the Gold Coast, close to the frontier with the French colony of the Ivory Coast. Kwame was his mother's only child. His father did not live with the family, but worked in Half Assini where he pursued his goldsmith business until his death. At age 3, Nkrumah and his mother moved to Half Assini to join his father. They sent him to the elementary school run by a Catholic mission at Half Assini, where he proved an adept student.

During his years as a student in the United States, he was known as Francis Nwia Kofi Nkrumah, Kofi being the Akan name given to males born on Fridays. He later changed his name to Kwame Nkrumah in 1945 in the UK, preferring the name "Kwame". According to Ebenezer Obiri Addo in his study of the future president, the name "Nkrumah", a name traditionally given to a ninth child, indicates that Kwame probably held that place in the house of his father, who had several wives.

His father, Opanyin Kofi Nwiana Ngolomah, came from Nkroful and belonged to the Asona clan of the Akan Tribe. Sources indicated that Ngolomah stayed at Tarkwa-Nsuaem and dealt in the goldsmith business. Ngolomah was respected for his wise counsel by those who sought his advice on traditional issues and domestic affairs. He died in 1927.

Although his mother, whose name was Elizabeth Nyanibah (1877–1979), later stated his year of birth as 1912, Nkrumah wrote that he was born on 21 September 1909. His mother hailed from Nsuaem and belonged to the Agona family. She was a fishmonger and petty trader when she married his father. Eight days after his birth, his father named him as Francis Nwia-Kofi after a relative but later his parents named him as Francis Kwame Ngolomah.

He progressed through the ten-year elementary programme in eight years. In 1925, he was a student-teacher in the school and was baptised into the Catholic faith. He would fondly remember having to stand atop a box to teach his mates. While at the school, he was noticed by the Reverend Alec Garden Fraser, principal of the Government Training College (soon to become Achimota School) in the Gold Coast's capital, Accra. Fraser arranged for Nkrumah to train as a teacher at his school. Here, Columbia-educated deputy headmaster Kwegyir Aggrey exposed him to the ideas of Marcus Garvey and W. E. B. Du Bois. Aggrey, Fraser, and others at Achimota thought that there should be close co-operation between the races in governing the Gold Coast, but Nkrumah, echoing Garvey, soon came to believe that only when the black race governed itself could there be harmony between the races.

After obtaining his teacher's certificate from the Prince of Wales' College at Achimota in 1930, Nkrumah was given a teaching post at the Catholic primary school in Elmina in 1931. During his years at Achimota, Nkrumah was noted for his debating and leadership skills, traits that later shaped his role as a nationalist leader.

After a year there, he was made headmaster of the school at Axim. In Axim, he started to get involved in politics and founded the Nzema Literary Society. In 1933, he was appointed a teacher at the Catholic seminary at Amissano. Although life there was strict, he liked it, and considered becoming a Jesuit. Nkrumah had heard journalist and future Nigerian president Nnamdi Azikiwe speak while a student at Achimota; the two men met and Azikiwe's influence increased Nkrumah's interest in black nationalism. The young teacher decided to further his education. Azikiwe had attended Lincoln University, a historically black college in Chester County, Pennsylvania, west of Philadelphia, and he advised Nkrumah to enroll there.

Nkrumah, who had failed the entrance examination for London University, gained funds for the trip and his education from relatives. He travelled by way of Britain, where he learned, to his outrage, of Italy's invasion of Ethiopia, one of the few independent African nations. He arrived in the United States, in October 1935.

=== United States ===
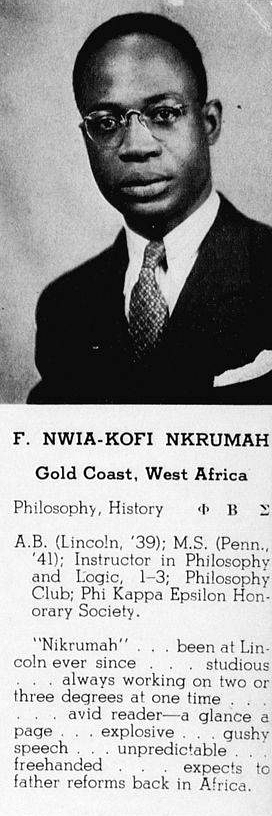
Nkrumah in the Lincoln University yearbook, 1942

According to historian John Henrik Clarke in his article on Nkrumah's American sojourn, "the influence of the ten years that he spent in the United States had a lingering effect on the rest of his life." Nkrumah had sought entry to Lincoln University some time before he began his studies there. On Friday, 1 March 1935, he sent the school a letter noting that his application had been pending for more than a year. The university responded, asking him to write a short essay on his life story and personal goals. He notably wrote of his ambitions, saying: "In all things, I have held myself to but one ambition and that is to make necessary arrangements to continue my education... that I may be better prepared to serve my fellowman."

When he arrived in New York in October 1935, he travelled to Pennsylvania, where he enrolled despite lacking the funds for the full semester. He soon won a scholarship that provided for his tuition at Lincoln University. He remained short of funds through his time in the US. To make ends meet, he did menial jobs on roles such as a wholesaler of fish and poultries, cleaner, dishwasher and others. On Sundays, he visited black Presbyterian churches in Philadelphia and in New York.

Nkrumah completed a Bachelor of Arts degree in economics and sociology in 1939. Lincoln then appointed him an assistant lecturer in philosophy. He began to receive invitations to be a guest preacher in Presbyterian churches in Philadelphia and New York. In 1939, Nkrumah enrolled at Lincoln's seminary and at the Ivy League institution, the University of Pennsylvania in Philadelphia and in 1942, he was initiated into the Mu chapter of Phi Beta Sigma fraternity at Lincoln University. Nkrumah gained a Bachelor of Theology degree from Lincoln in 1942, the top student in the course. He earned from Penn the following year a Master of Arts degree in philosophy and a Master of Science in education. While at Penn, Nkrumah worked with the linguist William Everett Welmers, providing the spoken material that formed the basis of the first descriptive grammar of his native Fante dialect of the Akan language. Nkrumah was also initiated into Prince Hall Freemasonry while living in the United States.

Nkrumah spent his summers in Harlem, a centre of black life, thought and culture. He found housing and employment in New York City with difficulty and involved himself in the community. He spent many evenings listening to and arguing with street orators, and according to Clarke, Kwame Nkrumah in his years in America stated;

These evenings were a vital part of Kwame Nkrumah's American education. He was going to a university – the university of the Harlem Streets. This was no ordinary time and these street speakers were no ordinary men ...The streets of Harlem were open forums, presided over [by] master speakers like Arthur Reed and his protege Ira Kemp. The young Carlos Cook [sic], founder of the Garvey oriented African Pioneer Movement was on the scene, also bringing a nightly message to his street followers. Occasionally Suji Abdul Hamid [sic], a champion of Harlem labour, held a night rally and demanded more jobs for blacks in their own community ...This is part of the drama on the Harlem streets as the student Kwame Nkrumah walked and watched.

Nkrumah was an activist student, organising a group of expatriate African students in Pennsylvania and building it into the African Students Association of America and Canada, becoming its president. Some members felt that the group should aspire for each colony to gain independence on its own; Nkrumah urged a Pan-African strategy. Nkrumah played a major role in the Pan-African conference held in New York in 1944, which urged the United States, at the end of the Second World War, to help ensure Africa became developed and free.

His old teacher Aggrey had died in 1929 in the US, and in 1942, Nkrumah led traditional prayers for Aggrey at the graveside. This led to a break between him and Lincoln, though after he rose to prominence in the Gold Coast, he returned in 1951 to accept an honorary degree. Nevertheless, Nkrumah's doctoral thesis remained uncompleted. He had adopted the forename Francis while at the Amissano seminary; in 1945, he took the name Kwame Nkrumah.

Just as in the days of the Egyptians, so today God had ordained that certain among the African race should journey westwards to equip themselves with knowledge and experience for the day when they would be called upon to return to their motherland and to use the learning they had acquired to help improve the lot of their brethren. ...I had not realised at the time that I would contribute so much towards the fulfillment of this prophecy.

— Kwame Nkrumah, The Autobiography of Kwame Nkrumah (1957)

Nkrumah read books about politics and divinity, and tutored students in philosophy. In 1943 Nkrumah met Trinidadian Marxist C. L. R. James, Russian expatriate Raya Dunayevskaya, and Chinese-American Grace Lee Boggs, all of whom were members of an American-based Marxist intellectual cohort. Nkrumah later credited James with teaching him "how an underground movement worked". Federal Bureau of Investigation files on Nkrumah, kept from January to May 1945, identify him as a possible communist. Nkrumah was determined to go to London, wanting to continue his education there now that the Second World War had ended. James, in a 1945 letter introducing Nkrumah to Trinidad-born George Padmore in London, wrote: "This young man is coming to you. He is not very bright, but nevertheless do what you can for him because he's determined to throw Europeans out of Africa."

=== London ===
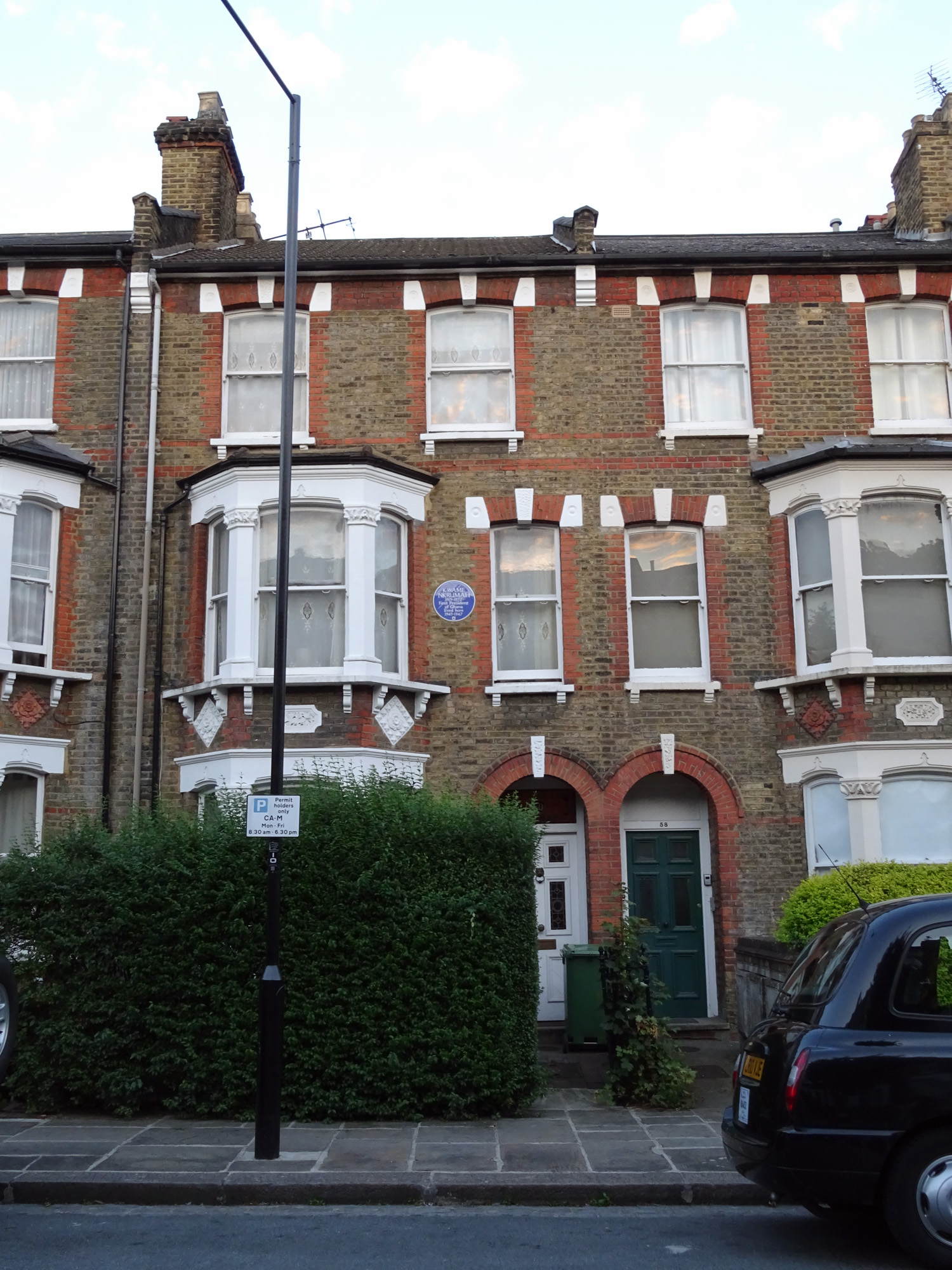
60 Burghley Road, Kentish Town, London, where Nkrumah lived when in London between 1945 and 1947

Nkrumah returned to London in May 1945 and enrolled at the London School of Economics as a PhD candidate in Anthropology. He withdrew after one term and the next year enrolled at University College London, with the intent to write a philosophy dissertation on "Knowledge and Logical Positivism". His supervisor, A. J. Ayer, declined to rate Nkrumah as a "first-class philosopher", saying, "I liked him and enjoyed talking to him but he did not seem to me to have an analytical mind. He wanted answers too quickly. I think part of the trouble may have been that he wasn't concentrating very hard on his thesis. It was a way of marking time until the opportunity came for him to return to Ghana." Finally, Nkrumah enrolled in, but did not complete, a study in law at Gray's Inn.

Nkrumah spent his time on political organisations. He and Padmore were among the principal organisers, and co-treasurers, of the Fifth Pan-African Congress in Manchester (15–19 October 1945). The Congress elaborated a strategy for supplanting colonialism with African socialism. They agreed to pursue a federal United States of Africa, with interlocking regional organisations, governing through separate states of limited sovereignty. They planned to pursue a new African culture without tribalism, democratic within a socialist system, synthesising traditional aspects with modern thinking, and for this to be achieved by non-violent means if possible. Among those who attended the congress was the venerable W. E. B. Du Bois along with some who later took leading roles in leading their nations to independence, including Hastings Banda of Nyasaland (which became Malawi), Jomo Kenyatta of Kenya and Obafemi Awolowo of Nigeria.

The congress sought to establish ongoing African activism in Britain in conjunction with the West African National Secretariat (WANS) to work towards the decolonisation of Africa. Nkrumah became the secretary of WANS. In addition to seeking to organise Africans to gain their nations' freedom, Nkrumah sought to succour the many West African seamen who had been stranded, destitute, in London at the end of the war, and established a Coloured Workers Association to empower and succour them. The U.S. State Department and MI5 watched Nkrumah and the WANS, focusing on their links with Communism. Nkrumah and Padmore established a group called The Circle to lead the way to West African independence and unity; the group aimed to create a Union of African Socialist Republics. A document from The Circle, setting forth that goal was found on Nkrumah upon his arrest in Accra in 1948, and was used against him by the British authorities. (Note: Members swore an oath of secrecy, pledging to "irrevocably obey" orders from the group, to "help a member brother of THE CIRCLE in all things and in all difficulties", to avoid the use of violence, to fast on the twenty-first day of the month, and finally, to "accept the leadership of Kwame Nkrumah". See: "The Circle" in Nationalism in Asia and Africa by Elie Kedourie, 1970.)

== Return to the Gold Coast ==
=== United Gold Coast Convention ===
The 1946 Gold Coast constitution gave Africans a majority on the legislative council for the first time. Seen as a major step towards self-government, the new arrangement prompted the colony's first true political party, founded in August 1947, the United Gold Coast Convention (UGCC). The UGCC sought self-government as quickly as possible. Since the leading members were all successful professionals, they needed to pay someone to run the party, and their choice fell on Nkrumah at the suggestion of Ako Adjei. Nkrumah hesitated but realised that the UGCC was controlled by conservative interests and noted that the new post could open huge political opportunities for him and accepted. After being questioned by British officials about his communist affiliations, Nkrumah boarded the MV Accra at Liverpool in November 1947 for the voyage home.

After brief stops in Sierra Leone, Liberia, and the Ivory Coast, he arrived in the Gold Coast where he briefly stayed and reunited with his mother in Tarkwa. He began work at the party's headquarters in Saltpond on 29 December 1947 where he worked as a general secretary. Nkrumah quickly submitted plans for branches of the UGCC to be established colony-wide, and for strikes if necessary to gain political ends. This activist stance divided the party's governing committee, which was led by J. B. Danquah. Nkrumah embarked on a tour to gain donations for the UGCC and establish new branches.

Although the Gold Coast was more developed politically than Britain's other West African colonies, there was considerable discontent. Postwar inflation had caused public anger at high prices, leading to a boycott of small businesses run by Arabs which began in January 1948. Local cocoa bean farmers were upset because trees exhibiting cacao swollen-shoot virus, but still capable of yielding a crop, were being destroyed by the colonial authorities. There were about 63,000 World War II veterans in the Gold Coast, many of whom had trouble obtaining employment and felt the colonial government was doing nothing to address their grievances. Nkrumah and Danquah addressed a meeting of the Ex-Service men's Union in Accra on 20 February 1948, which was made in advance of a planned march to present a petition to the governor. When the march took place on 28 February, three veterans were killed by police gunfire, prompting the 1948 Accra riots, which spread throughout the country. According to Nkrumah's biographer, David Birmingham, "West Africa's erstwhile "model colony" witnessed a riot and business premises were looted. The African Revolution had begun."

The colonial government assumed that the UGCC was responsible for the unrest, and arrested six leaders, including Nkrumah and Danquah. The Big Six were incarcerated together in Kumasi, increasing the rift between Nkrumah and the others, who blamed him for the riots and their detention. After the colonial government learned that there were plots to storm the prison, the six were separated, with Nkrumah sent to Lawra; all six were freed in April 1948. Many students and teachers had demonstrated for their release and had been suspended; Nkrumah, using his own funds, began the Ghana National College. This among other activities, led UGCC committee members to accuse him of acting in the party's name without authority. Fearing he would harm them more outside the party than within, they agreed to make him honorary treasurer. Nkrumah's popularity, already large, was increased with his founding of the Accra Evening News, which was not a party organ but was owned by Nkrumah and others. He also founded the Committee on Youth Organization (CYO) as a youth wing for the UGCC. It soon broke away and adopted the motto "Self-Government Now". The CYO united students, ex-servicemen, and market women. Nkrumah recounted in his autobiography that he knew that a break with the UGCC was inevitable, and wanted the masses behind him when the conflict occurred. Nkrumah's appeals for "Free-Dom" appealed to the great numbers of underemployed youths who had come from the farms and villages to the towns. "Old hymn tunes were adapted to new songs of liberation which welcomed traveling orators, and especially Nkrumah himself, to mass rallies across the Gold Coast."

According to a public speech delivered by Aaron Mike Oquaye, a meeting occurred in Saltpond, a town in the Central region, between Nkrumah and the members of UGCC where Nkrumah was said to have rejected a proposal for the promotion of fundamental human rights.

=== Convention People's Party ===
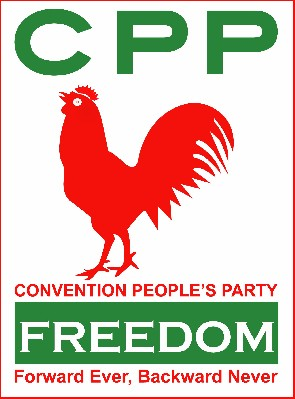
Red cockerel, "Forward Ever, Backward Never": Convention People's Party logo and slogan

Beginning in April 1949, there was considerable pressure on Nkrumah from his supporters to leave the UGCC and form his own party. On 12 June 1949, he announced the formation of the Convention People's Party (CPP), with the word "convention" chosen, according to Nkrumah, "to carry the masses with us". There were attempts to heal the breach with the UGCC; at one July meeting, it was agreed to reinstate Nkrumah as secretary and disband the CPP. But Nkrumah's supporters would not have it, and persuaded him to refuse the offer and remain at their head.

The CPP adopted the red cockerel as its symbol – a familiar icon for local ethnic groups, and a symbol of leadership, alertness, and masculinity. Party symbols and colours (red, white, and green) appeared on clothing, flags, vehicles and houses. CPP operatives drove red-white-and-green vans across the country, playing music and rallying public support for the party and especially for Nkrumah. These efforts were wildly successful, especially because previous political efforts in the Gold Coast had focused exclusively on the urban intelligentsia.

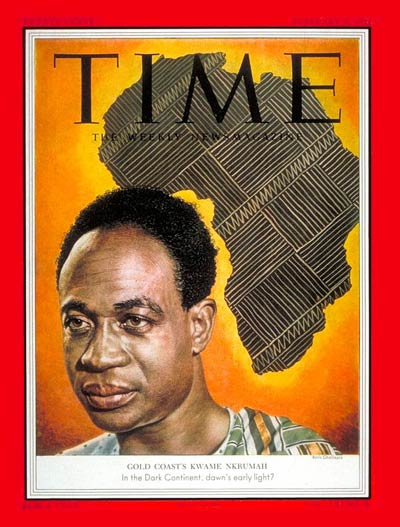
Kwame Nkrumah on the cover of Time, 9 February 1953

The British convened a selected commission of middle-class Africans, including all of the Big Six except Nkrumah, to draft a new constitution that would give the Gold Coast more self-government. Nkrumah saw, even before the commission reported, that its recommendations would fall short of full dominion status, and began to organise a Positive Action campaign. Nkrumah demanded a constituent assembly to write a constitution. When the governor, Charles Arden-Clarke, would not commit to this, Nkrumah called for positive action, with the unions beginning a general strike to begin on 8 January 1950. The strike quickly led to violence, and Nkrumah and other CPP leaders were arrested on 22 January, and the Evening News was banned. Nkrumah was sentenced to a total of three years in prison, and he was incarcerated with common criminals in Accra's Fort James.

Nkrumah's assistant, Komla Agbeli Gbedemah, ran the CPP in his absence; the imprisoned leader was able to influence events through smuggled notes written on toilet paper. The British prepared for an election for the Gold Coast under their new constitution, and Nkrumah insisted that the CPP contest all seats. The situation had become calmer once Nkrumah was arrested, and the CPP and the British worked together to prepare electoral rolls. Nkrumah stood, from prison, for a directly elected Accra seat. Gbedemah worked to set up a nationwide campaign organisation, using vans with loudspeakers to blare the party's message. The UGCC failed to set up a nationwide structure, and proved unable to take advantage of the fact that many of its opponents were in prison.

In the February 1951 legislative election, the first general election to be held under universal franchise in colonial Africa, the CPP was elected in a landslide. The CPP secured 34 of the 38 seats contested on a party basis, with Nkrumah elected for his Accra constituency. The UGCC won three seats, and one was taken by an independent. Arden-Clarke saw that the only alternative to Nkrumah's freedom was the end of the constitutional experiment. Nkrumah was released from prison on 12 February, receiving a rapturous reception from his followers. The following day, Arden-Clarke sent for him and asked him to form a government.

Nkrumah had stolen Arden-Clarke's secretary Erica Powell after she was dismissed and sent home for getting too close to Nkrumah. Powell returned to Ghana in January 1955 to be Nkrumah's private secretary, a position she held for ten years. Powell was very close to him and during their time together she largely wrote Nkrumah's (auto)biography, although this was not admitted until much later.

=== Leader of Government Business and Prime Minister ===
Nkrumah faced several challenges as he assumed office. He had never served in government, and needed to learn that art. The Gold Coast was composed of four regions, several former colonies amalgamated into one. Nkrumah sought to unite them under one nationality, and bring the country to independence. Key to meeting the challenges was convincing the British that the CPP's programmes were not only practical, but inevitable, and Nkrumah and Arden-Clarke worked closely together. The governor instructed the civil service to give the fledgling government full support, and the three British members of the cabinet took care not to vote against the elected majority.

Prior to the CPP taking office, British officials had prepared a ten-year plan for development. With demands for infrastructure improvements coming in from all over the colony, Nkrumah approved it in general, but halved the time to five years. The colony was in good financial shape, with reserves from years of cocoa profit held in London, and Nkrumah was able to spend freely. Modern trunk roads were built along the coast and within the interior. The rail system was modernised and expanded. Modern water and sewer systems were installed in most towns, where housing schemes were begun. Construction began on a new harbour at Tema, near Accra, and the existing port, at Takoradi, was expanded. An urgent programme to build and expand schools, from primary to teacher and trade training, began. From 1951 to 1956, the number of pupils being educated at the colony's schools rose from 200,000 to 500,000. Nevertheless, the number of graduates being produced was insufficient to the burgeoning civil service's needs, and in 1953, Nkrumah announced that though Africans would be given preference, the country would be relying on expatriate European civil servants for several years.

Nkrumah's title was Leader of Government Business in a cabinet chaired by Arden-Clarke. Quick progress was made, and in 1952, the governor withdrew from the cabinet, leaving Nkrumah as his prime minister, with the portfolios that had been reserved for expatriates going to Africans. There were accusations of corruption, and of nepotism, as officials, following African custom, attempted to benefit their extended families and their tribes. The recommendations following the 1948 riots had included elected local government rather than the existing system dominated by the chiefs. This was uncontroversial until it became clear that it would be implemented by the CPP. That party's majority in the Legislative Assembly passed legislation in late 1951 that shifted power from the chiefs to the chairs of the councils, though there was some local rioting as rates were imposed.

Nkrumah's re-titling as prime minister had not given him additional power, and he sought constitutional reform that would lead to independence. In 1952, he consulted with the visiting Colonial Secretary, Oliver Lyttelton, who indicated that Britain would look favourably on further advancement, so long as the chiefs and other stakeholders had the opportunity to express their views. Initially skeptical of Nkrumah's socialist policies, Britain's MI5 had compiled large amounts of intelligence on Nkrumah through several sources, including tapping phones and mail interception under the code name of SWIFT. Beginning in October 1952, Nkrumah sought opinions from councils and from political parties on reform, and consulted widely across the country, including with opposition groups. The result the following year was a White Paper on a new constitution, seen as a final step before independence. Published in June 1953, the constitutional proposals were accepted both by the assembly and by the British, and came into force in April of the following year. The new document provided for an assembly of 104 members, all directly elected, with an all-African cabinet responsible for the internal governing of the colony. In the election on 15 June 1954, the CPP won 71, with the regional Northern People's Party forming the official opposition.

A number of opposition groups formed the National Liberation Movement. Their demands were for a federal, rather than a unitary government for an independent Gold Coast, and for an upper house of parliament where chiefs and other traditional leaders could act as a counter to the CPP majority in the assembly. They drew considerable support in the Northern Territory and among the chiefs in Ashanti, who petitioned the British queen, Elizabeth II, asking for a royal commission into what form of government the Gold Coast should have. This was refused by her government, who in 1955 stated that such a commission should only be used if the people of the Gold Coast proved incapable of deciding their own affairs. Amid political violence, the two sides attempted to reconcile their differences, but the NLM refused to participate in any committee with a CPP majority. The traditional leaders were also incensed by a new bill that had just been enacted, which allowed minor chiefs to appeal to the government in Accra, bypassing traditional chiefly authority. The British were unwilling to leave unresolved the fundamental question as to how an independent Gold Coast should be governed, and in June 1956, the Colonial Secretary, Alan Lennox-Boyd announced that there would be another general election in the Gold Coast, and if a "reasonable majority" took the CPP's position, Britain would set a date for independence. The results of the July 1956 election were almost identical to those from four years before, and on 3 August the assembly voted for independence under the name Nkrumah had proposed in April, Ghana. In September, the Colonial Office announced independence day would be 6 March 1957.

The opposition was not satisfied with the plan for independence, and demanded that power be devolved to the regions. Discussions took place through late 1956 and into 1957. Although Nkrumah did not compromise on his insistence on a unitary state, the nation was divided into five regions, with power devolved from Accra, and the chiefs having a role in their governments. On 21 February 1957, the British prime minister, Harold Macmillan, announced that Ghana would be a full member of the Commonwealth of Nations with effect from 6 March.

== Ghanaian independence ==
The old Gold Coast flag, symbolising the supremacy of the British Empire

Nkrumah's new flag of Ghana, symbolising African nationalism and abundance

Ghana became independent on 6 March 1957 as the Dominion of Ghana. As the first of Britain's African colonies to gain majority-rule independence, the celebrations in Accra were the focus of world attention; over 100 reporters and photographers covered the events. United States president Dwight D. Eisenhower sent congratulations and his vice president, Richard Nixon, to represent the U.S. at the event. The Soviet delegation urged Nkrumah to visit Moscow as soon as possible. Political scientist Ralph Bunche, an African American, was there for the United Nations, while the Duchess of Kent represented Queen Elizabeth II. Offers of assistance poured in from across the world. Even without them, the country seemed prosperous, with cocoa prices high and the potential of new resource development.

As the fifth of March turned to the sixth, Nkrumah stood before tens of thousands of supporters and proclaimed, "Ghana will be free forever." He spoke at the first session of the Ghana Parliament that Independence Day, telling his new country's citizens that "we have a duty to prove to the world that Africans can conduct their own affairs with efficiency and tolerance and through the exercise of democracy. We must set an example to all Africa."

As part of the ceremony, Nkrumah gave a speech to instill hope and ooze assurance.

Nkrumah was hailed as the Osagyefo – which means "redeemer" in the Akan language. This independence ceremony included the Duchess of Kent and Governor General Charles Arden-Clarke. With more than 600 reporters in attendance, Ghanaian independence became one of the most internationally reported news events in modern African history.

The flag of Ghana was designed by Theodosia Okoh, inverting Ethiopia's green-yellow-red Lion of Judah flag and replacing the lion with a black star. Red symbolises bloodshed; green stands for beauty, agriculture, and abundance; yellow represents mineral wealth; and the Black Star represents African freedom. The country's new coat of arms, designed by Amon Kotei, includes eagles, a lion, a St. George's Cross, and a Black Star, with copious gold and gold trim. Philip Gbeho was commissioned to compose the new national anthem, "God Bless Our Homeland Ghana".

As a monument to the new nation, Nkrumah opened Black Star Square near Osu Castle in the coastal district of Osu, Accra. This square would be used for national symbolism and mass patriotic rallies.

Under Nkrumah's leadership, Ghana adopted some social democratic policies and practices. Nkrumah created a welfare system, started various community programs, and established schools.

== Ghana's leader (1957–1966) ==
=== Political developments and presidential election ===
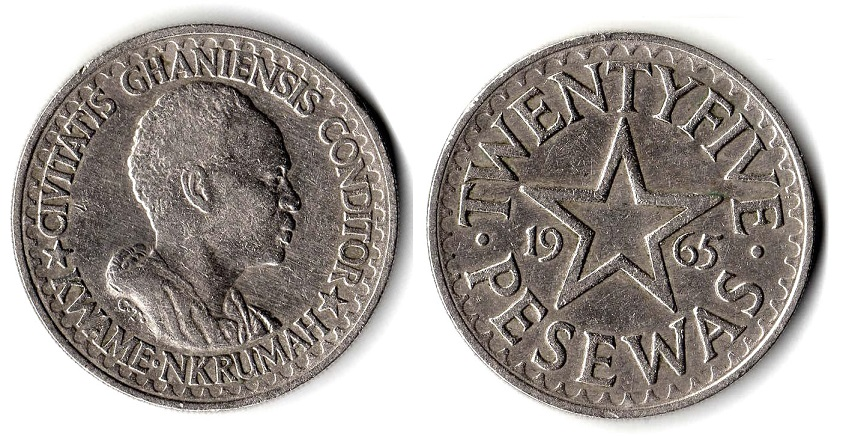
25 pesewas (Ȼ0.25) coins depicting Nkrumah: "Civitatis Ghanensis Conditor" ("Founder of the Ghanaian State")

Nkrumah had only a short honeymoon before there was unrest among his country's people. The government deployed troops to Togoland to quell unrest following a disputed plebiscite on membership in the new country. A serious bus strike in Accra stemmed from resentments among the Ga people, who believed members of other tribes were getting preferential treatment in government promotion, and thus resulted in riots there in August. Nkrumah's response was to repress local movements by the Avoidance of Discrimination Act (6 December 1957), which banned regional or tribal-based political parties. Another strike at tribalism fell in Ashanti, where Nkrumah and the CPP got most local chiefs who were not party supporters destooled. These repressive actions concerned the opposition parties, who came together to form the United Party under Kofi Abrefa Busia.

In 1958, an opposition MP was arrested on charges of attempting to obtain arms abroad for a planned infiltration of the Ghana Army (GA). Nkrumah was convinced there had been an assassination plot against him, and his response was to have the parliament pass the Preventive Detention Act, allowing for incarceration for up to five years without charge or trial, with only Nkrumah empowered to release prisoners early. According to Nkrumah's biographer, David Birmingham, "no single measure did more to bring down Nkrumah's reputation than his adoption of internment without trial for the preservation of security." Nkrumah intended to bypass the British-trained judiciary, which he saw as opposing his plans when they subjected them to constitutional scrutiny.

Another source of irritation was the regional assemblies, which had been organised on an interim basis pending further constitutional discussions. The opposition, which was strong in Ashanti and the north, proposed significant powers for the assemblies; the CPP wanted them to be more or less advisory. In 1959, Nkrumah used his majority in the parliament to push through the Constitutional Amendment Act, which abolished the assemblies and allowed the parliament to amend the constitution with a simple majority.

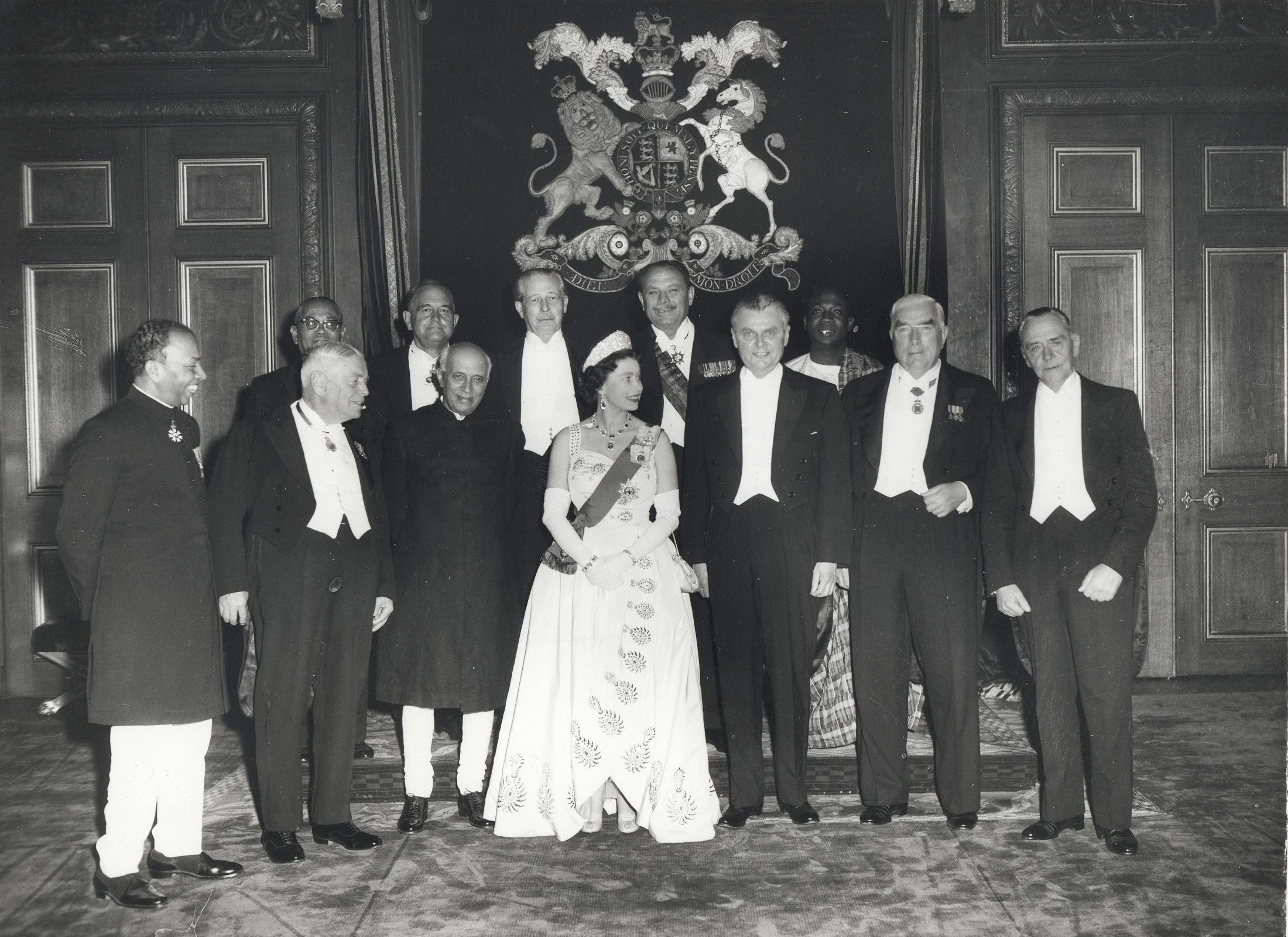
Nkrumah (first in right, back row) at the 1960 Commonwealth Prime Minister's Conference

Queen Elizabeth II remained sovereign over Ghana from 1957 to 1960. William Hare, 5th Earl of Listowel was the governor-general, and Nkrumah remained prime minister. On 6 March 1960, Nkrumah announced plans for a new constitution that would make Ghana a republic, headed by a president with broad executive and legislative powers. The draft included a provision to surrender Ghanaian sovereignty to a Union of African States. On 19, 23, and 27 April 1960 a presidential election and plebiscite on the constitution were held. The constitution was ratified and Nkrumah was elected president over J. B. Danquah, the UP candidate, 1,016,076 to 124,623. Ghana remained a part of the British-led Commonwealth of Nations.

==== Opposition to tribalism ====
Illegal Asante flag, with colours symbolising gold, ancestral power, and the forest, and Golden Stool symbolising Asante political authority

Porcupine emblem, symbolising Asante motto, "If you greet us with peace, we will greet you with peace. But if you greet us with war, then we will greet you with war."

Nkrumah also sought to eliminate "tribalism", a source of loyalties held more deeply than those to the nation-state. Thus, as he wrote in Africa Must Unite: "We were engaged in a kind of war, a war against poverty and disease, against ignorance, against tribalism and disunity. We needed to secure the conditions which could allow us to pursue our policy of reconstruction and development." To this end, in 1958, his government passed "An Act to prohibit organizations using or engaging in racial or religious propaganda to the detriment of any other racial or religious community, or securing the election of persons on account of their racial or religious affiliations, or for other purposes in connection therewith." Nkrumah attempted to saturate the country in national flags, and declared a widely disobeyed ban on tribal flags.

Kofi Abrefa Busia of the United Party (Ghana) gained prominence as an opposition leader in the debate over this Act, taking a more classically liberal position and criticising the ban on tribal politics as repressive. Soon after, he left the country. Nkrumah was also a very flamboyant leader. The New York Times in 1972 wrote: "During his high‐flying days as the leader of Ghana in the 1950s and early 1960s, Kwame Nkrumah was a flamboyant spellbinder. At home, he created a cult of personality and gloried in the title of Osagyefo (Akan for 'Redeemer'). Abroad, he met with the world's leaders as the first man to lead an African colony to independence after World War II."

During his tenure as prime minister and then first president, Nkrumah succeeded in reducing the political importance of the local chieftaincy (e.g., the Akan chiefs and the Asantehene). These chiefs had maintained authority during colonial rule through collaboration with the British authorities; in fact, they were sometimes favoured over the local intelligentsia, who made trouble for the British with organisations like the Aborigines' Rights Protection Society. The Convention People's Party had a strained relationship with the chiefs when it came to power, and this relationship became more hostile as the CPP incited political opposition chiefs and criticised the institution as undemocratic. Acts passed in 1958 and 1959 gave the government more power to destool chiefs directly, and proclaimed government of stool land – and revenues. These policies alienated the chiefs and led them to looking favourably on the overthrow of Nkrumah and his Party.

==== Increased power of the Convention People's Party ====
In 1962, three younger members of the CPP were brought up on charges of taking part in a plot to blow up Nkrumah's car in a motorcade. The sole evidence against the alleged plotters was that they rode in cars well behind Nkrumah's car. When the defendants were acquitted, Nkrumah sacked the chief judge of the state security court, then got the CPP-dominated parliament to pass a law allowing a new trial. At this second trial, all three men were convicted and sentenced to death, though these sentences were subsequently commuted to life imprisonment. Shortly afterward, the constitution was amended to give the president the power to summarily remove judges at all levels.

In 1964, Nkrumah proposed a constitutional amendment that would make the CPP the only legal party, with Nkrumah as president for life of both nation and party. The amendment passed with 99.91 percent of the vote, an implausibly high total that led observers to condemn the vote as "obviously rigged". Ghana had effectively been a one-party state since independence. The amendment transformed Nkrumah's presidency into a de facto legal dictatorship.

=== Civil service ===
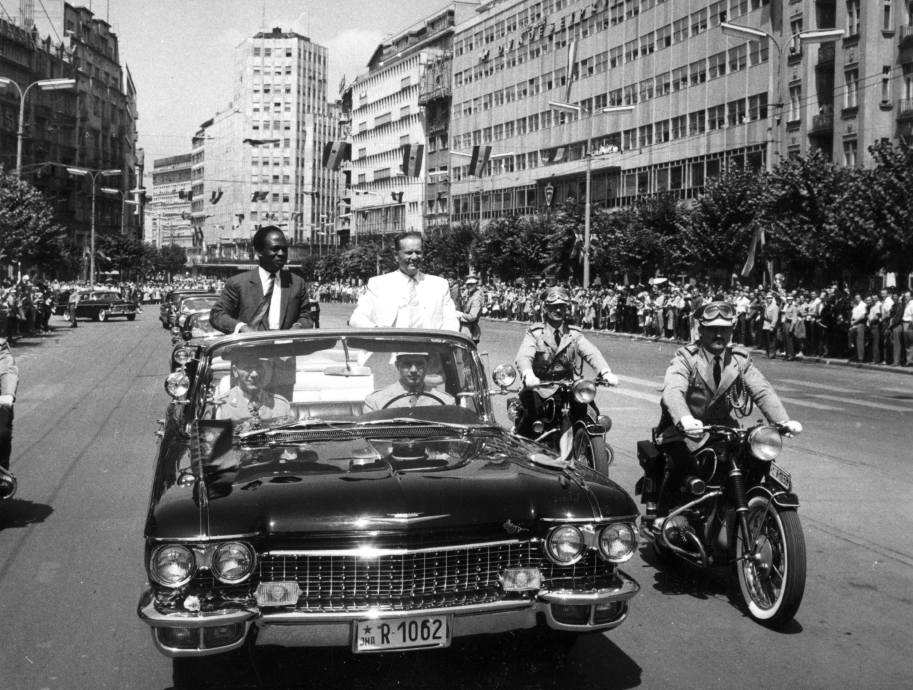
Arrival of the president of Ghana, Kwame Nkrumah, and president of Yugoslavia, Josip Broz Tito, to the first conference of the Non-Aligned Movement, Belgrade, 1961

After substantial Africanisation of the civil service in 1952–60, the number of expatriates rose again from 1960 to 1965. Many of the new outside workers came not from the United Kingdom but from the Soviet Union, Poland, Czechoslovakia, Yugoslavia, and Italy.

=== Education ===
In 1951, the CPP created the Accelerated Development Plan for Education. This plan set up a six-year primary course, to be attended as close to universally as possible, with a range of possibilities to follow. All children were to learn arithmetic, as well as gain "a sound foundation for citizenship with permanent literacy in both English and the vernacular." Primary education became compulsory in 1962. The plan also stated that religious schools would no longer receive funding, and that some existing missionary schools would be taken over by government.

We in Ghana, are committed to the building of an industrialised socialist society. We cannot afford to sit still and be mere passive onlookers. We must ourselves take part in the pursuit of scientific and technological research as a means of providing the basis for our socialist society, Socialism without science is void.…

We need also to reach out to the mass of the people who have not had the opportunities of formal education. We must use every means of mass communication – the press, the radio, television and films – to carry science to the whole population – to the people. ...
It is most important that our people should not only be instructed in science but that they should take part in it, apply it themselves in their own ways. For science is not just a subject to be learned out of a book or from a teacher. It is a way of life, a way of tackling any problem which one can only master by using it for oneself. We must have science clubs in which our people can develop their own talents for discovery and invention.

— Kwame Nkrumah "Speech delivered by Osagyefo the President at the Laying of the Foundation Stone of Ghana's Atomic Reactor at Kwabenya on 25th November, 1964"

In 1961, Nkrumah laid the first stones in the foundation of the Kwame Nkrumah Ideological Institute created to train Ghanaian civil servants as well as promote Pan-Africanism. In 1964, all students entering college in Ghana were required to attend a two-week "ideological orientation" at the institute. Nkrumah remarked that "trainees should be made to realize the party's ideology is religion, and should be practiced faithfully and fervently."

In 1964, Nkrumah brought forth the Seven Year Development Plan for National Reconstruction and Development, which identified education as a key source of development and called for the expansion of secondary technical schools. Secondary education would also include "in-service training programmes". As Nkrumah told Parliament: "Employers, both public and private, will be expected to make a far greater contribution to labour training through individual factory and farm schools, industry-wide training schemes, day release, payment for attendance at short courses and evening classes." This training would be indirectly subsidised with tax credits and import allocations.

In 1952, the Artisan Trading Scheme, arranged with the Colonial Office and UK Ministry of Labour, provided for a few experts in every field to travel to Britain for technical education. Kumasi Technical Institute was founded in 1956. In September 1960, it added the Technical Teacher Training Centre. In 1961, the CPP passed the Apprentice Act, which created a general Apprenticeship Board along with committees for each industry.

=== Culture ===
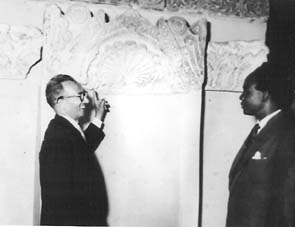
Nkrumah with Egyptian Egyptologist Pahor Labib at the Coptic Museum, 1956

Nkrumah was an ardent promoter of pan-Africanism, seeing the movement as the "quest for regional integration of the whole of the African continent". The period of Nkrumah's active political involvement has been described as the "golden age of high pan-African ambitions"; the continent had experienced rising nationalist movements and decolonisation by most European colonial powers, and historians have noted that "the narrative of rebirth and solidarity had gained momentum within the pan-Africanist movement". Reflecting his African heritage, Nkrumah frequently eschewed Western fashion, donning a fugu (a Northern attire) made with Southern-produced Kente cloth, a symbol of his identity as a representative of the entire country. He oversaw the opening of the Ghana Museum on 5 March 1957; the Arts Council of Ghana, a wing of the Ministry of Education and Culture, in 1958; the Research Library on African Affairs in June 1961; and the Ghana Film Corporation in 1964. In 1962, Nkrumah opened the Institute of African Studies.

A campaign against nudity in the northern part of the country received special attention from Nkrumah, who reportedly deployed Propaganda Secretary Hannah Cudjoe to respond. Cudjoe also formed the Ghana Women's League, which advanced the Party's agenda on nutrition, raising children, and wearing clothing. The League also led a demonstration against the detonation of French nuclear weapons in the Sahara. Cudjoe was eventually demoted with the consolidation of national women's groups, and marginalised within the Party structure.

Laws passed in 1959 and 1960 designated special positions in parliament to be held by women. Some women were promoted to the CPP Central Committee. Women attended more universities, took up more professions including medicine and law, and went on professional trips to Israel, the Soviet Union, and the Eastern Bloc. Women also entered the army and air force. Most women remained in agriculture and trade; some received assistance from the Co-operative Movement.

Nkrumah's image was widely disseminated, for example, on postage stamps and on money, in the style of monarchs – providing fodder for accusations of a Nkrumahist personality cult.

=== Media ===
In 1957, Nkrumah created a well-funded Ghana News Agency to generate domestic news and disseminate it abroad. In ten years time the GNA had 8045 km of domestic telegraph line, and maintained stations in Lagos, Nairobi, London and New York City.

To the true African journalist, his newspaper is a collective organiser, a collective instrument of mobilisation and a collective educator—a weapon, first and foremost, to overthrow colonialism and imperialism and to assist total African independence and unity.

— Kwame Nkrumah at the Second Conference of African Journalists; Accra, November 11, 1963

Nkrumah consolidated state control over newspapers, establishing the Ghanaian Times in 1958 and then in 1962 obtaining its competitor, the Daily Graphic, from the Mirror Group of London. As he wrote in Africa Must Unite: "It is part of our revolutionary credo that within the competitive system of capitalism, the press cannot function in accordance with a strict regard for the sacredness of facts, and that the press, therefore, should not remain in private hands." Starting in 1960, he invoked the right of pre-publication censorship of all news.

The Gold Coast Broadcasting Service was established in 1954 and revamped as the Ghana Broadcasting Corporation (GBC). Many television broadcasts featured Nkrumah, commenting for example on the problematic "insolence and laziness of boys and girls". Before celebrations of May Day, 1963, Nkrumah went on television to announce the expansion of Ghana's Young Pioneers, the introduction of a National Pledge, the beginning of a National Flag salute in schools, and the creation of a National Training program to inculcate virtue and the spirit of service among Ghanaian youth. Nkrumah outlined his views on the role of Ghanaian television to Parliament on 15 October 1963 saying, "Ghana's television will not cater for cheap entertainment or commercialism; its paramount objective will be education in its broadest and purest sense."

As per the 1965 Instrument of Incorporation of the Ghana Broadcasting Corporation, the Minister of Information and Broadcasting had "powers of direction" over the media, and the president had the power "at any time, if he is satisfied that it is in the national interest to do so, take over the control and management of the affairs or any part of the functions of the Corporation," hiring, firing, reorganising, and making other commands at will.

Radio programmes, designed in part to reach non-reading members of the public, were a major focus of the Ghana Broadcasting Corporation. In 1961, the GBC formed an external service broadcasting in English, French, Arabic, Swahili, Portuguese and Hausa. Using four 100-kilowatt transmitters and two 250-kilowatt transmitters, the GBC External Service broadcast 110 hours of Pan-Africanist programming to Africa and Europe each week.

He refused advertising in all media, beginning with the Evening News of 1948.

=== Labour ===
Various measures affecting workers were also carried out during Nkrumah's time in office. The Labour Registration Act of 1958 made it compulsory for unions to belong to the national Trade Union Congress and also sought to promote (as noted by one study) "the negotiation of wages and hours through collective bargaining". The 1963 Workmen's Compensation Act provided extended coverage (as one observer has noted) "for accident compensation, job-induced disability, or death" Another Workmen's Compensation Act passed two years later made better provision (according to one study) for the protection of the rights of injured workmen who are illiterate and of other injured workmen in respect of agreements as to the amount of the compensation to be paid by their employer". In 1960, a national minimum wage rate of US$0.91 was introduced, and the Public Holidays passed the following year provided for 9 days of public holiday with pay for wage earners. In addition, the Social Security Act of 1965 introduced benefits for widows, invalids and the elderly.

=== Economic policy ===
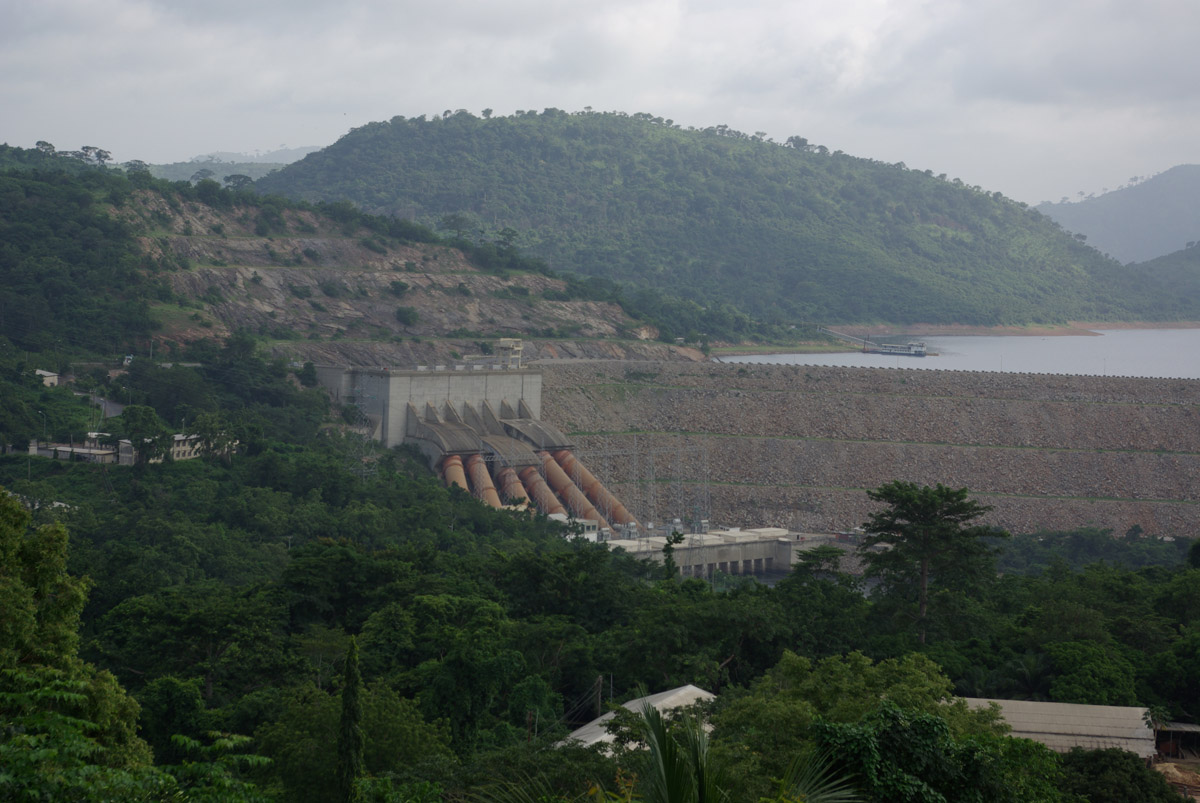
Akosombo hydroelectric dam

Nkrumah visits the Akosombo Dam under construction with his 1961 Chevrolet Impala presidential car, February 1962.

The Gold Coast had been among the wealthiest and most socially advanced areas in Africa, with schools, railways, hospitals, social security, and an advanced economy.

Nkrumah attempted to rapidly industrialise Ghana's economy. He reasoned that if Ghana escaped the colonial trade system by reducing dependence on foreign capital, technology, and material goods, it could become truly independent.

After the Ten Year Development Plan, Nkrumah brought forth the Second Development Plan in 1959. This plan called for the development of manufacturing: 600 factories producing 100 varieties of product.

The Statutory Corporations Act, passed in November 1959 and revised in 1961 and 1964, created the legal framework for public corporations, which included state enterprises. This law placed the country's major corporations under the direction of government ministers. The State Enterprises Secretariat office was located in Flagstaff House and under the direct control of the president.

After visiting the Soviet Union, Eastern Europe and China in 1961, Nkrumah apparently became still more convinced of the need for state control of the economy.

During Nkrumah's time in office, free health care and education were introduced.

A Seven-Year Plan introduced in 1964 focused on further industrialisation, emphasising domestic substitutes for common imports, modernisation of the building materials industry, machine making, electrification and electronics.

==== Energy projects ====
Nkrumah's advocacy of industrial development, with help of longtime friend and minister of finance, Komla Agbeli Gbedema, led to the Volta River Project: the construction of a hydroelectric power plant, the Akosombo Dam on the Volta River in eastern Ghana. The Volta River Project was the centrepiece of Nkrumah's economic programme. On 20 February 1958, he told the National Assembly: "It is my strong belief that the Volta River Project provides the quickest and most certain method of leading us towards economic independence." Ghana used assistance from the United States, Israel and the World Bank in constructing the dam.

Kaiser Aluminum agreed to build the dam for Nkrumah, but restricted what could be produced using the power generated. Nkrumah borrowed money to build the dam, and placed Ghana in debt. To finance the debt, he raised taxes on the cocoa farmers in the south. This accentuated regional differences and resentment. The dam was completed and opened by Nkrumah amidst global publicity on 22 January 1966.

Nkrumah initiated the Ghana Nuclear Reactor Project in 1961, created the Ghana Atomic Energy Commission in 1963, and in 1964 laid the first stone in the building of an atomic energy facility.

==== Cocoa ====
In 1954 the world price of cocoa rose from £150 to £450 per ton. Rather than allowing cocoa farmers to keep the windfall, Nkrumah appropriated the increased revenue via central government levies, then invested the capital into various national development projects. This policy alienated one of the major constituencies that helped him come to power.

Prices continued to fluctuate. In 1960 one ton of cocoa sold for £250 in London. By August 1965 this price had dropped to £91, one fifth of its value ten years before. The quick price decline caused the government's reliance on the reserves and forced farmers to take a portion of their earning in bonds.

=== Foreign and military policy ===
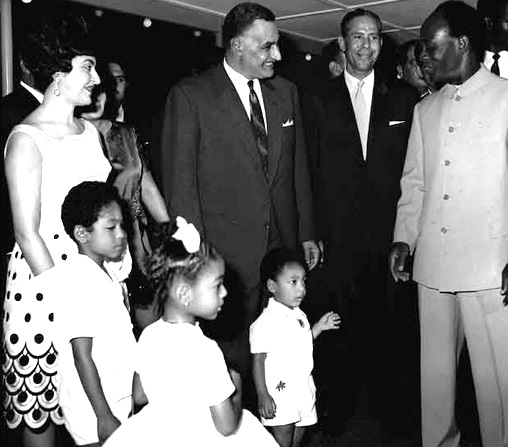
Nkrumah and his family meeting Egyptian President Gamal Abdel Nasser during the 1965 Organization of African Unity Summit in Accra

Nkrumah actively promoted a policy of Pan-Africanism from the beginning of his presidency. This entailed the creation of a series of new international organisations, which held their inaugural meetings in Accra. These were:

- the First Conference of Independent States, in April 1958;
- the more inclusive All-African Peoples' Conference, with representatives from 62 nationalist organisations from across the continent, in December 1958;
- the All-African Trade Union Federation, meeting in November 1959, to coordinate the African labour movement;
- the Positive Action and Security in Africa conference, in April 1960, discussing Algeria, South Africa, and French nuclear weapons testing;
- the Conference of African Women, on 18 July 1960.

Meanwhile, Ghana withdrew from colonial organisations including West Africa Airways Corporation, the West African Currency Board, the West African Cocoa Research Institute and the West African Court of Appeal.

In the Year of Africa, 1960, Nkrumah negotiated the creation of a Union of African States, a political alliance between Ghana, Guinea, and Mali. Immediately, they formed a women's group called Women of the Union of African States.

Nkrumah was a leading figure in the short-lived Casablanca Group of African leaders, which sought to achieve pan-African unity and harmony through deep political, economic, and military integration of the continent in the early 1960s prior to the establishment of the Organisation of African Unity (OAU). In 1961, he was a participant in the 1st Summit of the Non-Aligned Movement in Belgrade, FPR Yugoslavia making Ghana one of the founding members of the Non-Aligned Movement.

Nkrumah was instrumental in the creation of the OAU in Addis Ababa in 1963. He aspired to create a united military force, the African High Command, which Ghana would substantially lead, and committed to this vision in Article 2 of the 1960 Republican Constitution:"In the confident expectation of an early surrender of sovereignty to a union of African states and territories, the people now confer on Parliament the power to provide for the surrender of the whole or any part of the sovereignty of Ghana."

He was also a proponent of the United Nations, but critical of the Great Powers' ability to control it.

Nkrumah opposed the entry of African states into the Common Market of the European Economic Community, a status given to many former French colonies and considered by Nigeria. Instead, Nkrumah advocated, in a speech given on 7 April 1960,

an African common market, a common currency area and the development of communications of all kinds to allow the free flow of goods and services. International capital can be attracted to such viable economic areas, but it would not be attracted to a divided and balkanized Africa, with each small region engaged in senseless and suicidal economic competition with its neighbours.

Nkrumah sought to exploit the Cold War rivalry between the United States and the Soviet Union in order to gain maximum concessions from both sides in their geopolitical attempts to outmaneuvre one another in West Africa and elsewhere. This was exemplified by the Volta River Dam Project and its back-and-forth oscillation between Soviet and Western financial backing.

==== Armed forces ====
In 1956, the Gold Coast took control of the Royal West African Frontier Force (RWAFF), Gold Coast Regiment, from the British War Office. This force had formerly been deployed to quell internal dissent, and occasionally to fight in wars: most recently, in World War II, against the Japanese in India and Burma. The most senior officers in this force were British, and, although training of African officers began in 1947, only 28 of 212 officers in December 1956 were indigenous Africans. The British officers still received British salaries, which vastly exceeded those allotted to their Ghanaian counterparts. Concerned about a possible military coup, Nkrumah delayed the placement of African officers in top leadership roles.

Nkrumah quickly established the Ghanaian Air Force, acquiring 14 Beaver airplanes from Canada and setting up a flight school with British instructors. Otters, Caribou, and Chipmunks were to follow. Ghana also obtained four Ilyushin-18 aircraft from the Soviet Union. Preparation began in April 1959 with assistance from India and Israel. Nkrumah also established a gliding school led by Hanna Reitsch and J.E.S. de Graft-Hayford.

The Ghanaian Navy received two inshore minesweepers with 40mm and 20mm guns, the Afadzato and the Yogaga, from Britain in December 1959. It subsequently received the Elmina and the Komenda, seaward defence boats with 40-millimetre guns. The Navy's flagship, and training ship, was the Achimota, a British yacht constructed during World War II. In 1961, the Navy ordered two 600-ton corvettes, the Keta and Kromantse, from Vosper & Company and received them in 1967. It also procured four Soviet patrol boats. Naval officers were trained at the Britannia Royal Naval College in Dartmouth. The Ghanaian military budget rose each year, from $9.35 million (US dollars) in 1958 to $47 million in 1965.

The first international deployment of the Ghanaian armed forces was to the Congo (Léopoldville/Kinshasa), where Ghanaian troops were airlifted in 1960 at the beginning of the Congo Crisis. One week after Belgian troops occupied the lucrative mining province of Katanga, Ghana dispatched more than a thousand of its own troops to join a United Nations force. The use of British officers in this context was politically unacceptable, and this event occasioned a hasty transfer of officer positions to Ghanaians. The Congo war was long and difficult. On 19 January 1961 the Third Infantry Battalion mutinied. On 28 April 1961, 43 men were massacred in a surprise attack by the Congolese army.

Ghana also gave military support to rebels fighting against Ian Smith's white-minority government in Rhodesia (now Zimbabwe), which had unilaterally declared independence from Britain in 1965.

==== Relationship with Communist world ====
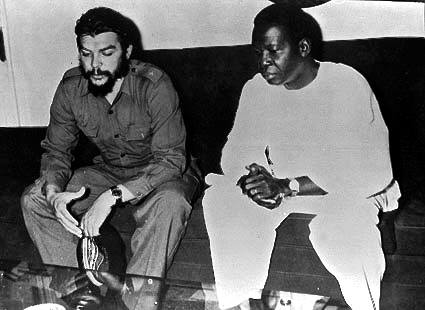
Nkrumah with Ernesto "Che" Guevara, January 1965

In 1961, Nkrumah went on tour through Eastern Europe, proclaiming solidarity with the Soviet Union and the People's Republic of China. Nkrumah's clothing changed to the Chinese-supplied Mao suit.

In 1962 Kwame Nkrumah was awarded the Lenin Peace Prize by the Soviet Union.

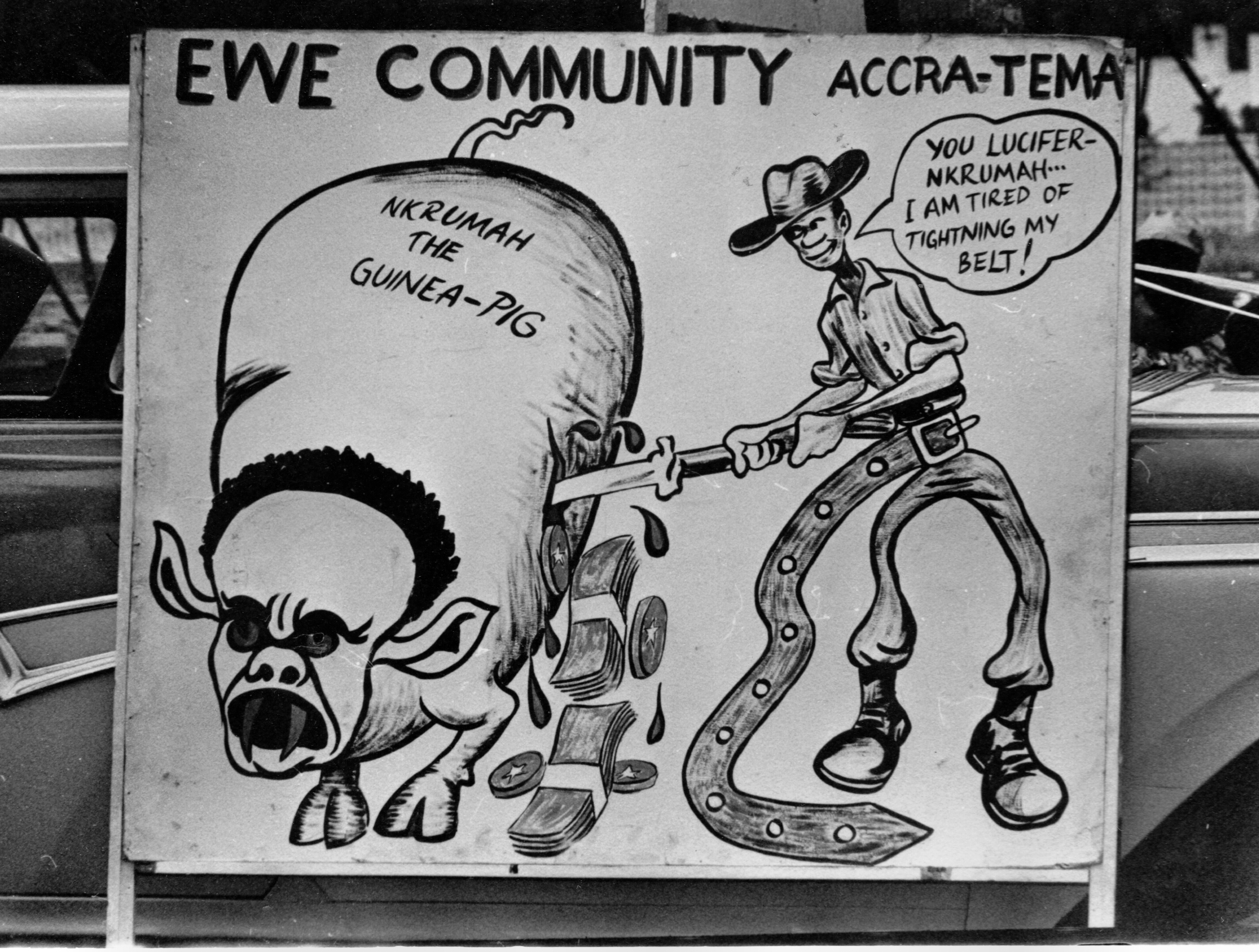
Anti-Nkrumah placard at a demonstration after the coup

== 1966 coup d'état ==
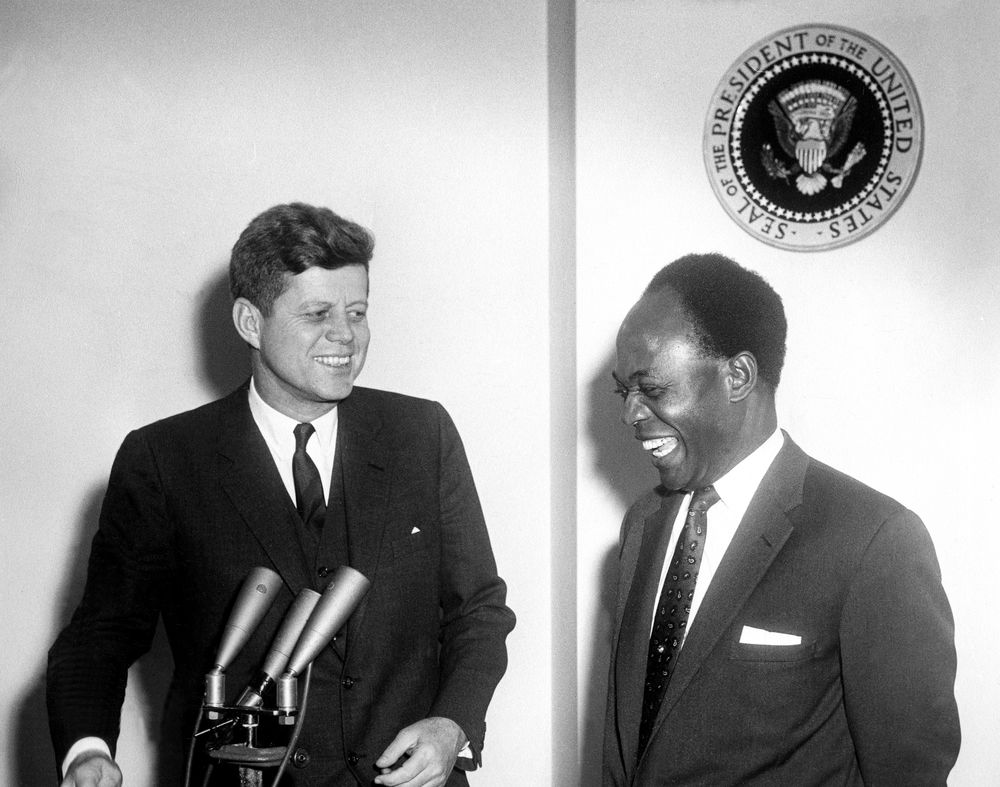
Kwame Nkrumah with U.S. President John F. Kennedy, 8 March 1961

In February 1966, while Nkrumah was on a state visit to China on the way to North Vietnam and North Korea, his government was overthrown in a violent coup d'état led by the national military and police forces, with backing from the civil service deposing his authority. The conspirators, led by Joseph Arthur Ankrah, named themselves the National Liberation Council and ruled as a military government for three years. Nkrumah did not learn of the coup until he arrived in China. After the coup, Nkrumah stayed in Beijing for four days, and Premier Zhou Enlai treated him with courtesy.

Nkrumah alluded to American involvement in the coup in his 1969 memoir, Dark Days in Ghana; he may have based this conclusion on documents shown to him by the KGB. In 1978 John Stockwell, former chief of the Angola Task Force of the CIA turned critic, wrote that agents at the CIA's Accra station "maintained intimate contact with the plotters as a coup was hatched". Afterward, "inside CIA headquarters the Accra station was given full, if unofficial credit for the eventual coup. ...None of this was adequately reflected in the agency's written records." Later that same year, Seymour Hersh, then at The New York Times, defended Stockwell's account, citing "first hand intelligence sources". He claimed that "many CIA operatives in Africa considered the agency's role in the overthrow of Nkrumah to have been pivotal." These claims have never been verified.

Following the coup, Ghana realigned itself internationally, cutting its close ties to Guinea and the Eastern Bloc, accepting a new friendship with the Western Bloc, and inviting the International Monetary Fund and World Bank to take a leading role in managing the economy. With this reversal, accentuated by the expulsion of immigrants and a new willingness to negotiate with apartheid South Africa, Ghana lost a good deal of its stature in the eyes of African nationalists.

In assessing Nkrumah's legacy, Edward Luttwak argued that he was undone by the growth of political consciousness and his inability to repress potential opponents:

Nkrumah, in spite of his eccentricities, was largely defeated by his own success: the by-product of the considerable economic development achieved by Ghana was to stimulate and educate the masses and the new elite; their attitude to Nkrumah's regime became more and more critical in the light of the education the regime itself provided. When this happens, more and more repression and propaganda are needed to maintain political stability. In spite of considerable efforts, Nkrumah was unable to build a sufficiently ruthless police system. The cause of his downfall was not, therefore, the mismanagement of the economy—which was considerable—but rather the success of much of the development effort.

— Edward Luttwak, Coup d'État: A Practical Handbook (1968)

== Exile and death ==
Nkrumah died on 27 April 1972, in Bucharest, the capital of Romania, of an unknown but apparently incurable sickness. Since the coup, he had been living in the Guinean capital of Conakry, lying low.

== Tributes and legacy ==
Over his lifetime, Nkrumah was awarded honorary doctorates by many universities including Lincoln University (Pennsylvania), Moscow State University (USSR), Cairo University (Egypt), Jagiellonian University (Poland), and Humboldt University (East Germany).

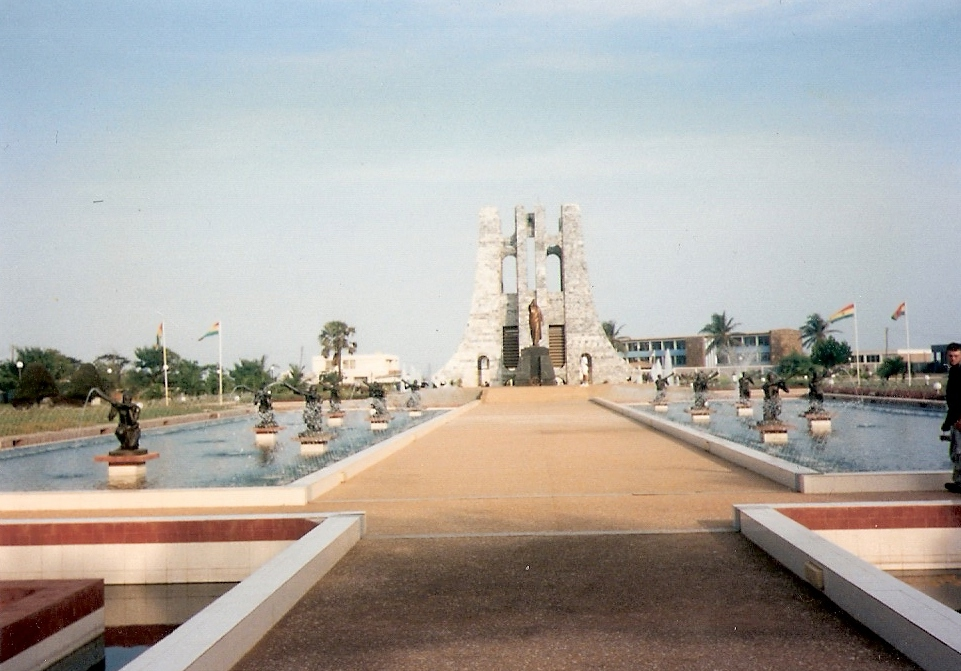
Kwame Nkrumah Memorial Park and Mausoleum

In 2000, he was voted African Man of the Millennium by listeners to the BBC World Service, being described by the BBC as a "Hero of Independence", and an "International symbol of freedom as the leader of the first black African country to shake off the chains of colonial rule."

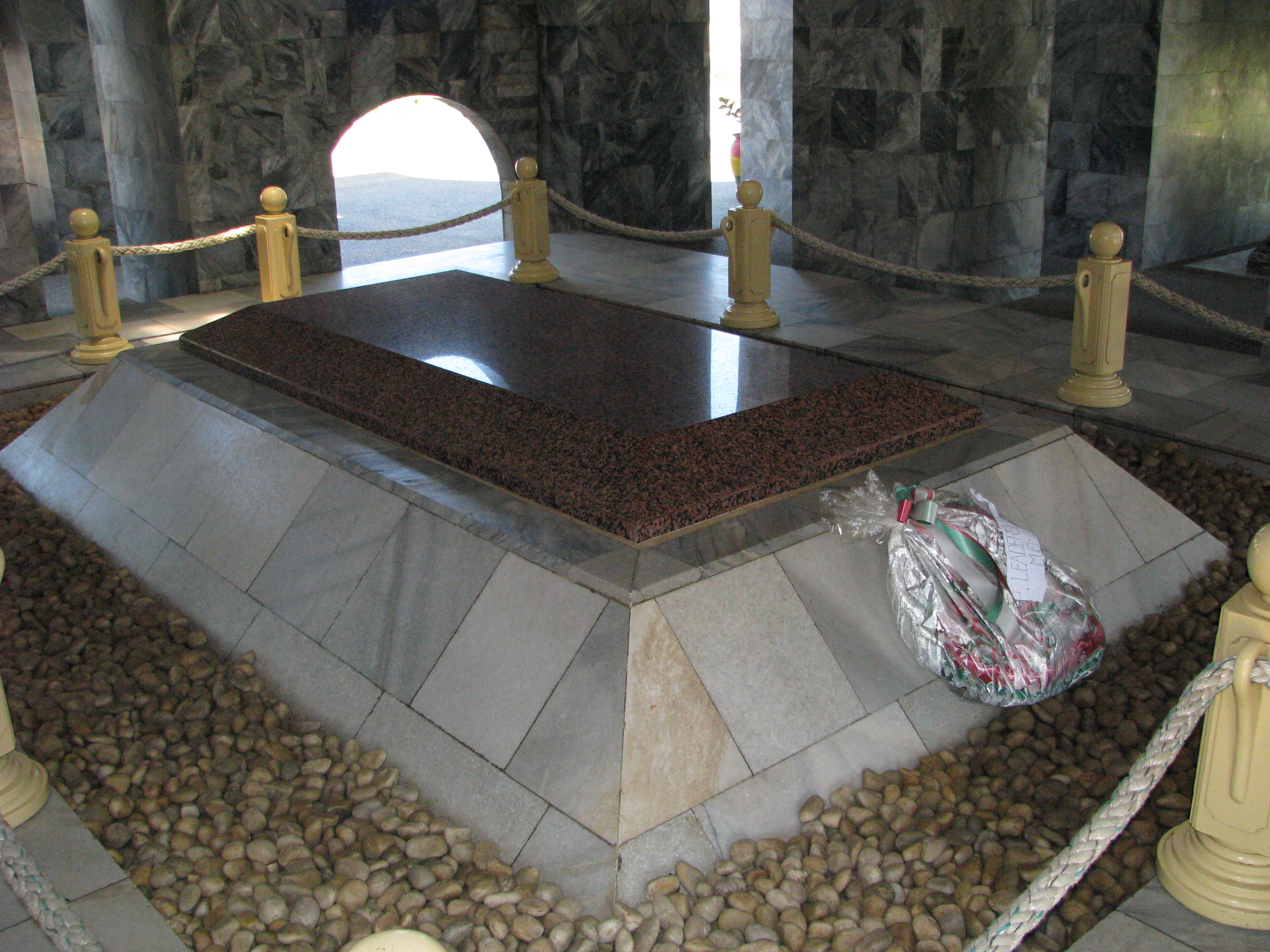
Kwame Nkrumah's grave inside the Kwame Nkrumah memorial in Accra

According to intelligence documents released by the U.S. Department of State's Office of the Historian, "Nkrumah was doing more to undermine [U.S. government] interests than any other black African."

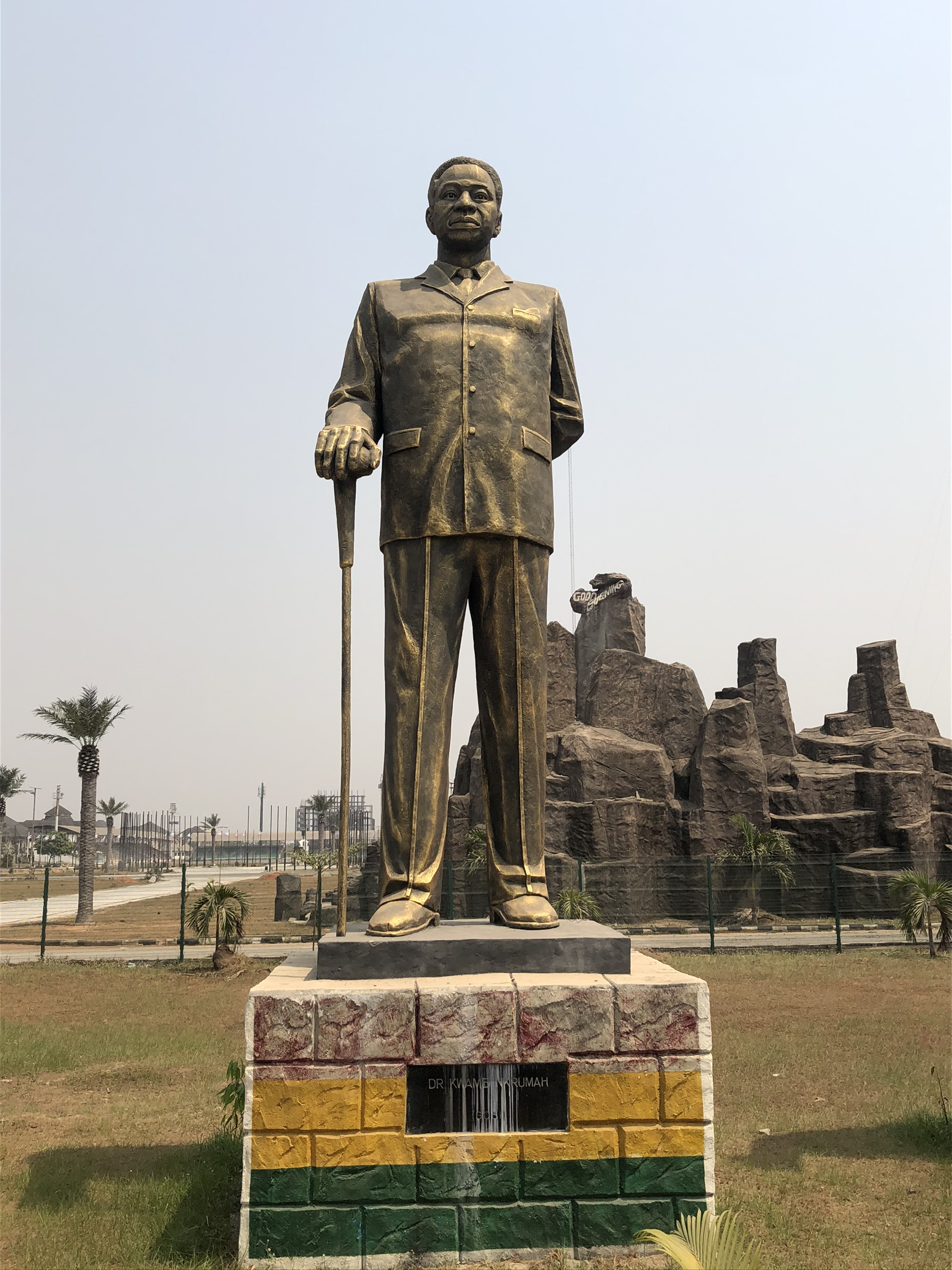
Statue of Kwame Nkrumah in Owerri, Imo State, Nigeria

In September 2009, President John Atta Mills declared 21 September (the 100th anniversary of Kwame Nkrumah's birth) to be Founders' Day, a statutory holiday in Ghana to celebrate the legacy of Kwame Nkrumah. In April 2019, President Akufo-Addo approved the Public Holidays (Amendment) Act 2019 which changed 21 September from Founders' Day to Kwame Nkrumah Memorial Day.

Nkrumah generally took a non-aligned Marxist perspective on economics, and believed capitalism had malignant effects that were going to stay with Africa for a long time. Although he was clear on distancing himself from the African socialism of many of his contemporaries, Nkrumah argued that socialism was the system that would best accommodate the changes that capitalism had brought, while still respecting African values. He specifically addresses these issues and his politics in a 1967 essay entitled "African Socialism Revisited":

We know that the traditional African society was founded on principles of egalitarianism. In its actual workings, however, it had various shortcomings. Its humanist impulse, nevertheless, is something that continues to urge us towards our all-African socialist reconstruction. We postulate each man to be an end in himself, not merely a means; and we accept the necessity of guaranteeing each man equal opportunities for his development. The implications of this for sociopolitical practice have to be worked out scientifically, and the necessary social and economic policies pursued with resolution. Any meaningful humanism must begin from egalitarianism and must lead to objectively chosen policies for safeguarding and sustaining egalitarianism. Hence, socialism. Hence, also, scientific socialism.

Nkrumah was also best-known politically for his strong commitment to and promotion of pan-Africanism. He was inspired by the writings of black intellectuals such as Marcus Garvey, W. E. B. Du Bois, and George Padmore, and his relationships with them. Much of his understanding and relationship to these men was created during his years in America as a student. Some would argue that his greatest inspiration was Marcus Garvey, although he also had a meaningful relationship with C. L. R. James. Nkrumah looked to these men to craft a general solution to the ills of Africa. To follow in these intellectual footsteps Nkrumah had intended to continue his education in London, but found himself involved in direct activism. Then, motivated by advice from Du Bois, Nkrumah decided to focus on creating peace in Africa. He became a passionate advocate of the "African Personality", embodied in the slogan "Africa for the Africans", earlier popularised by Edward Wilmot Blyden, and he viewed political independence as a prerequisite for economic independence. Nkrumah's dedications to pan-Africanism in action attracted these intellectuals to his Ghanaian projects. Many Americans, such as Du Bois and Kwame Ture, moved to Ghana to join him in his efforts. Du Bois and Ture are buried there today. His press officer for six years was the Grenadian anticolonialist Sam Morris. Nkrumah's biggest success in this area was his significant influence in the founding of the Organisation of African Unity.

Nkrumah also became a symbol for black liberation in the United States. When in 1958 the Harlem Lawyers Association had an event in Nkrumah's honour, diplomat Ralph Bunche told him:

We salute you, Kwame Nkrumah, not only because you are Prime Minister of Ghana, although this is cause enough. We salute you because you are a true and living representation of our hopes and ideals, of the determination we have to be accepted fully as equal beings, of the pride we have held and nurtured in our African origin, of the freedom of which we know we are capable, of the freedom in which we believe, of the dignity imperative to our stature as men.

In 1961, Nkrumah delivered a speech called "I Speak of Freedom". During this speech he talked about how "Africa could become one of the greatest forces for good in the world". He mentions how Africa is a land of "vast riches" with mineral resources from that "range from gold and diamonds to uranium and petroleum". Nkrumah says that the reason Africa is not thriving right now is because the European powers have been taking all the wealth for themselves. If Africa could be independent of European rule, he said, then it could truly flourish and contribute positively to the world. In the ending words of this speech Nkrumah calls his people to action by saying "This is our chance. We must act now. Tomorrow may be too late and the opportunity will have passed, and with it the hope of free Africa's survival". This rallied the nation in a nationalistic movement.

In his honour, an annual event called "Journey to Nkroful" was set up to celebrate his birthday. Mausoleum and Museum at Nkroful, Western Region have been named after him that showcase some of the artifacts he used when alive.

The Kwame Nkrumah Memorial Park and Mausoleum in Accra was refurbished and reopened to the public in 2023. Also, University of Science and Technology was changed to Kwame Nkrumah University of Science and Technology to recognise his support building a strong education system in the country.

== Personal life ==
Kwame Nkrumah married Fathia Ritzk, an Egyptian Coptic bank worker and former teacher, on the evening of her arrival in Ghana: New Year's Eve, 1957–1958. Fathia's mother refused to bless their marriage, after another one of her children left with a foreign husband.

As a married couple, Fathia and Nkrumah had three children: Gamal (born 1958), Samia (born 1960) and Sekou (born 1964). Gamal is a newspaper journalist, while Samia and Sekou are politicians. Nkrumah also has another son, Francis, a paediatrician (born 1935).

== Cultural depictions ==
In the 2010 book The Other Wes Moore, Nkrumah, during his time in the United States, is noted to have served as a mentor to the author's grandfather for several months upon the immigration of the author's family into the country.

Nkrumah is played by Danny Sapani in the Netflix television series The Crown (season 2, episode 8 "Dear Mrs Kennedy"). The show's portrayal of the historical significance of the Queen's visit to Ghana and dance with Nkrumah has been described as exaggerated in one source interviewing Nat Nuno-Amarteifio, later mayor of Accra, who was a teenage student at the time.

African's Black Star: The Legacy of Kwame Nkrumah is a 2011 film about the rise and fall of this colonial rebellion leader.

A golden statue of Nkrumah is a centrepiece in Ghanaian rapper Serious Klein's 2021 video "Straight Outta Pandemic".

Even though the state film archive was ordered to be burned after the coup, Nkrumah's personal cameraman Chris Hesse was able to preserve 1300 rolls of film which were not revealed to the public until he was in his 90s. Hesse's attempts to screen the footage publicly were made into a documentary film, The Eyes of Ghana, that was produced by Barack and Michelle Obama and premiered at the 2025 Toronto International Film Festival.

== Honours and awards ==
=== Foreign honours ===
Ribbon	Distinction	Country	Date	Reference
	Grand Cordon of the Order of the Nile	Egypt	1957	
	Grand Cordon of the National Order of the Cedar	Lebanon	1957	
	Order of the Yugoslav Great Star	Yugoslavia	2 March 1961	
	Collar of the Order of the White Lion	Czechoslovakia	2 August 1961	
	Lenin Peace Prize	Soviet Union	30 April 1962	
	Knight Grand Cross with Collar of the Order of Merit of the Italian Republic	Italy	25 September 1963	
	Grand Cross of the Order of Polonia Restituta	Poland	1965	
	Supreme Companion of the Order of the Companions of O. R. Tambo	South Africa	16 June 2004 (posthumously)	

== Works ==
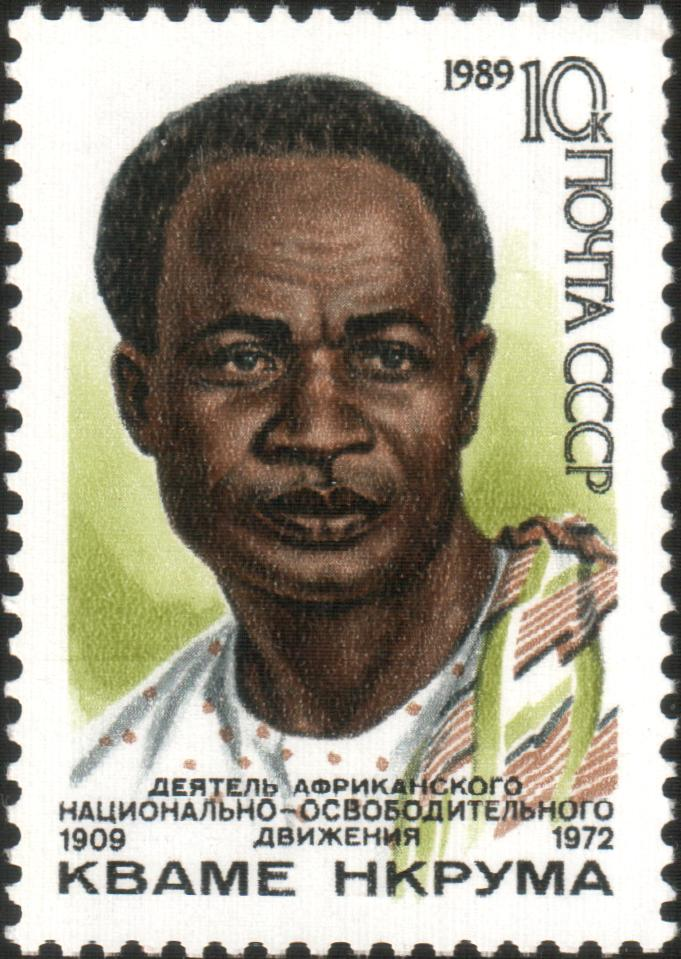
A postage stamp from the Soviet Union marking the 80th anniversary of his birth

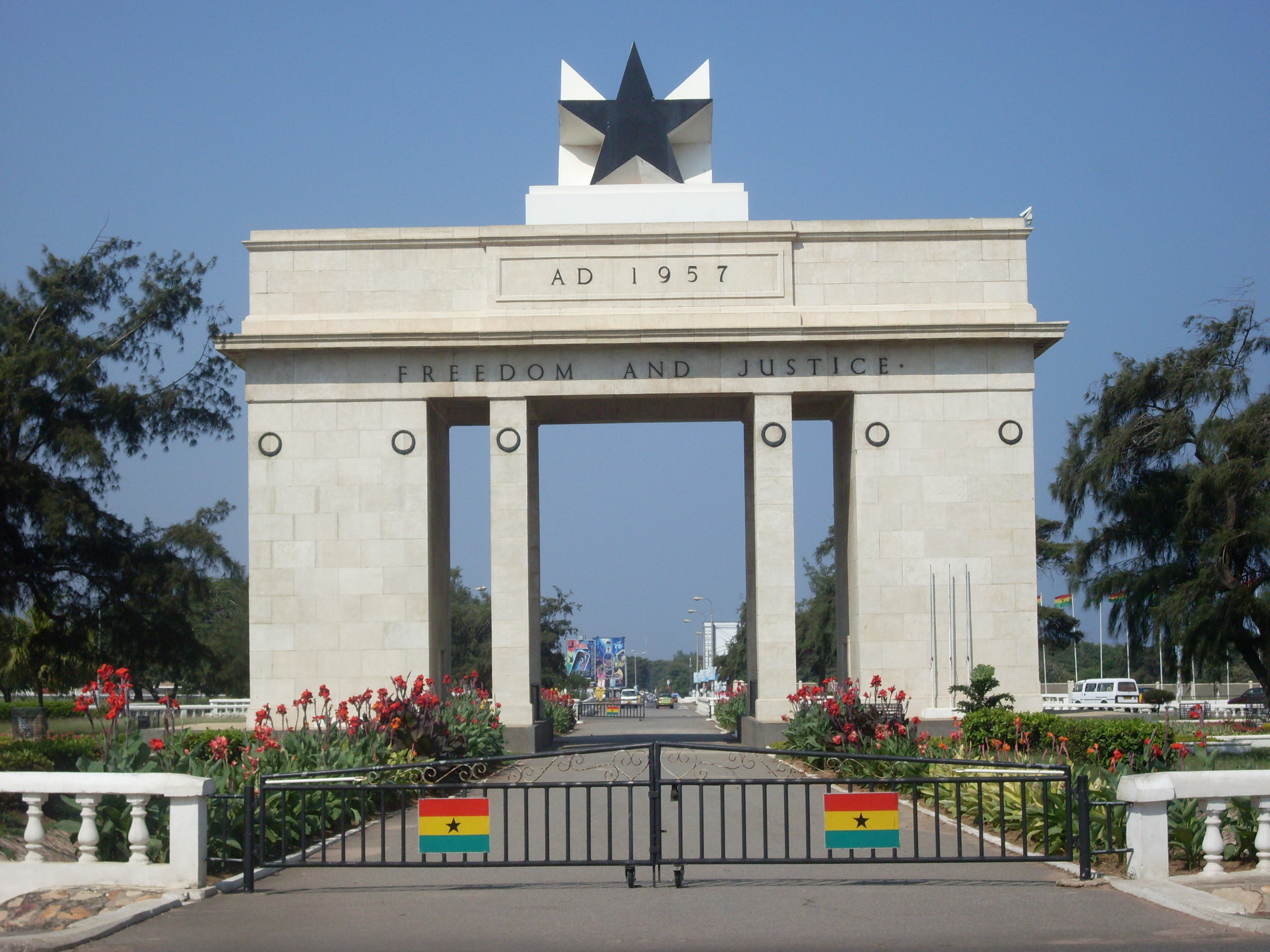
Independence Arch in Accra

- "Negro History: European Government in Africa", The Lincolnian, 12 April 1938, p. 2 (Lincoln University, Pennsylvania) – see Special Collections and Archives, Lincoln University
- "Primitive Education in West Africa". University of Pennsylvania Archives. January 1941. Archived from the original on 3 March 2024.
- "Education and Nationalism in Africa". University of Pennsylvania Archives. November 1943. Archived from the original on 3 March 2024.
- Ghana: The Autobiography of Kwame Nkrumah (1957). ISBN 0-901787-60-4
- Africa Must Unite (1963). ISBN 0-901787-13-2
- African Personality (1963)

The essence of neo-colonialism is that the State which is subject to it is, in theory, independent and has all the outward trappings of international sovereignty. In reality its economic system and thus its political policy is directed from outside.

— Introduction

- Neo-Colonialism, the Last Stage of Imperialism (1965)
- Axioms of Kwame Nkrumah (1967). ISBN 0-901787-54-X
- African Socialism Revisited (1967)
- Challenge of the Congo (1967)
- Voice From Conakry (1967). ISBN 90-17-87027-3
- Dark Days in Ghana (1968). ISBN 0-7178-0046-6
- Handbook of Revolutionary Warfare (1968). ISBN 0-7178-0226-4
- The Way Out, "Civilian Rule" Fraud and A Call for Positive Action and Armed Struggle (1970)
- Consciencism: Philosophy and Ideology for De-Colonisation (1970). ISBN 0-901787-11-6
- Class Struggle in Africa (1970). ISBN 0-901787-12-4
- The Struggle Continues (1973). ISBN 0-901787-41-8
- I Speak of Freedom (1973). ISBN 0-901787-14-0
- Revolutionary Path (1973). ISBN 978-0-901787-22-4

== See also ==
- Kwame Nkrumah Festival
- Nkrumah government

== Bibliography ==
- Addo, Ebenezer Obiri (1997). Kwame Nkrumah: A Case Study of Religion and Politics in Ghana. University Press of America. ISBN 978-0-7618-0785-8.
- Birmingham, David (1998). Kwame Nkrumah: The Father of African Nationalism. Ohio University Press. ISBN 978-0-8214-1242-8.
- Bourret, F. M. (1960) [1949]. Ghana—The Road to Independence (Revised ed.). Stanford University Press. OCLC 414362.
- Clarke, John Henrik (October 1974). "Kwame Nkrumah: His years in America". The Black Scholar. 6 (2): 9–16. doi:10.1080/00064246.1974.11431459. JSTOR 41065759. S2CID 141785632.
- Fuller, Harcourt (2014). Building the Ghanaian Nation-State. Palgrave Macmillan. ISBN 978-1-137-44856-9.
- French, Howard W. (2025). The Second Emancipation: Nkrumah, Pan-Africanism, and Global Blackness at High Tide. Liveright Publishing Corporation. ISBN 978-1-324-09245-2
- Mazrui, Ali (2004). Nkrumah's Legacy and Africa's Triple Heritage Between Globalization and Counter Terrorism. Ghana Universities Press. ISBN 978-9964-3-0296-2.
- Owusu-Ansah, David (2014). Biographical Dictionary of Ghana (4th ed.). Rowman & Littlefield. ISBN 978-0-8108-7242-4.
- Rooney, David (1988). Kwame Nkrumah: The Political Kingdom in the Third World. St. Martin's Press. ISBN 978-0-312-02479-6.
- Sherwood, Marika (1996). Kwame Nkrumah: The Years Abroad 1935–1947. Freedom Publications. ISBN 978-9988-7716-0-7.
- Thompson, W. Scott (1969). Ghana's Foreign Policy 1957–1966. Princeton University Press. OCLC 2616.

Party political offices
New office	Leader of the Convention People's Party; 1948–66	Succeeded by Position abolished
Political offices
New office	Prime Minister of the Gold Coast; 1952–57	Succeeded by Himself as Prime Minister of Ghana
Preceded by Himself as Prime Minister of the Gold Coast	Prime Minister of Ghana; 1957–60	Vacant Title next held by Kofi Abrefa Busia
New office	Minister for Foreign Affairs; 1957–58	Succeeded by Kojo Botsio
New office	Minister for Defence; 1957–60	Succeeded by Charles de Graft Dickson
Preceded by Krobo Edusei	Minister for the Interior; 1958	Succeeded by Ashford Emmanuel Inkumsah
Preceded by Elizabeth II as Queen of Ghana	President of Ghana; 1960–66	Succeeded by Joseph Arthur Ankrah
Preceded by Ebenezer Ako-Adjei	Minister for Foreign Affairs; 1962–63	Succeeded by Kojo Botsio
Diplomatic posts
Preceded by Gamal Abdel Nasser	Chairperson of the Organisation of African Unity; 1965–66	Succeeded by Joseph Arthur Ankrah
